= Nové Sedlice =

- Municipality
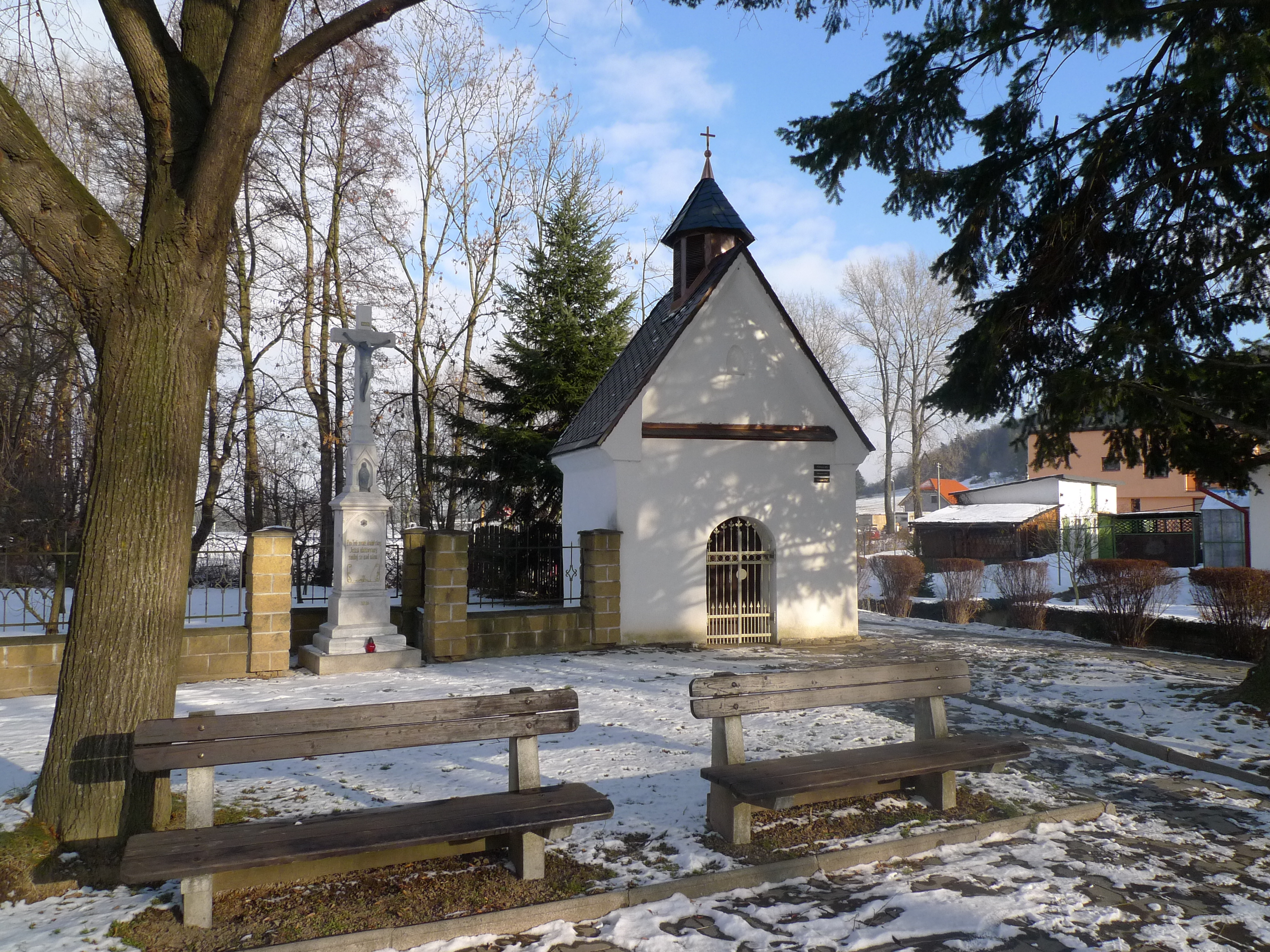
- Chapel of the Holy Trinity

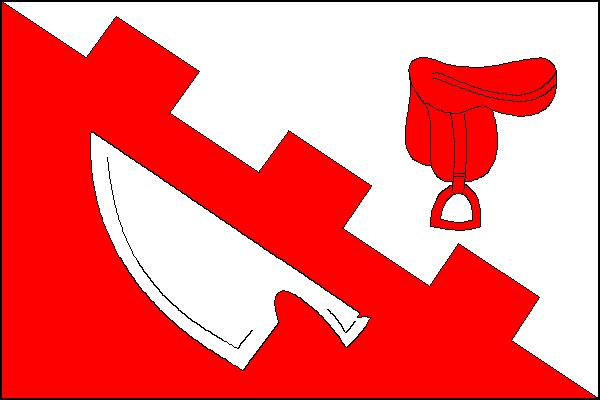
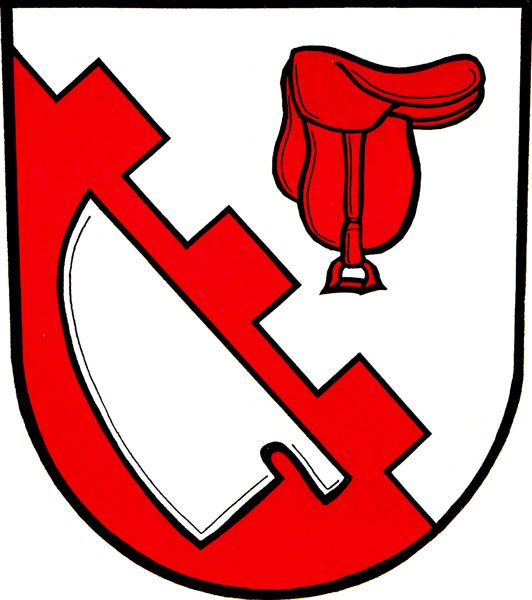
- Flag Coat of arms

- Location in the Czech Republic
- Coordinates: 49°54′8″N 18°0′5″E
- Country: Czech Republic
- Region: Moravian-Silesian
- District: Opava
- First mentioned: 1377

Area
  - Total: 1.58 km^{2} (0.61 sq mi)
- Elevation: 260 m (850 ft)

Population (2026-01-01)
  - Total: 506
  - Density: 320/km^{2} (829/sq mi)
- Time zone: UTC+1 (CET)
  - Summer (DST): UTC+2 (CEST)
- Postal code: 747 06
- Website: www.novesedlice.cz

Nové Sedlice (German: Neu Sedlitz) is a municipality and village in Opava District in the Moravian-Silesian Region of the Czech Republic. It has about 500 inhabitants.

== History ==
The first written mention of Nové Sedlice is from 1377.

== Demographics ==
Historical population
Year	Pop.	±%
1869	424	—
1880	460	+8.5%
1890	473	+2.8%
1900	432	−8.7%
1910	485	+12.3%
1921	495	+2.1%
1930	530	+7.1%
1950	404	−23.8%
1961	470	+16.3%
1970	427	−9.1%
1980	422	−1.2%
1991	430	+1.9%
2001	466	+8.4%
2011	486	+4.3%
2021	481	−1.0%
Source: Censuses
