= Bratříkovice =

- Municipality
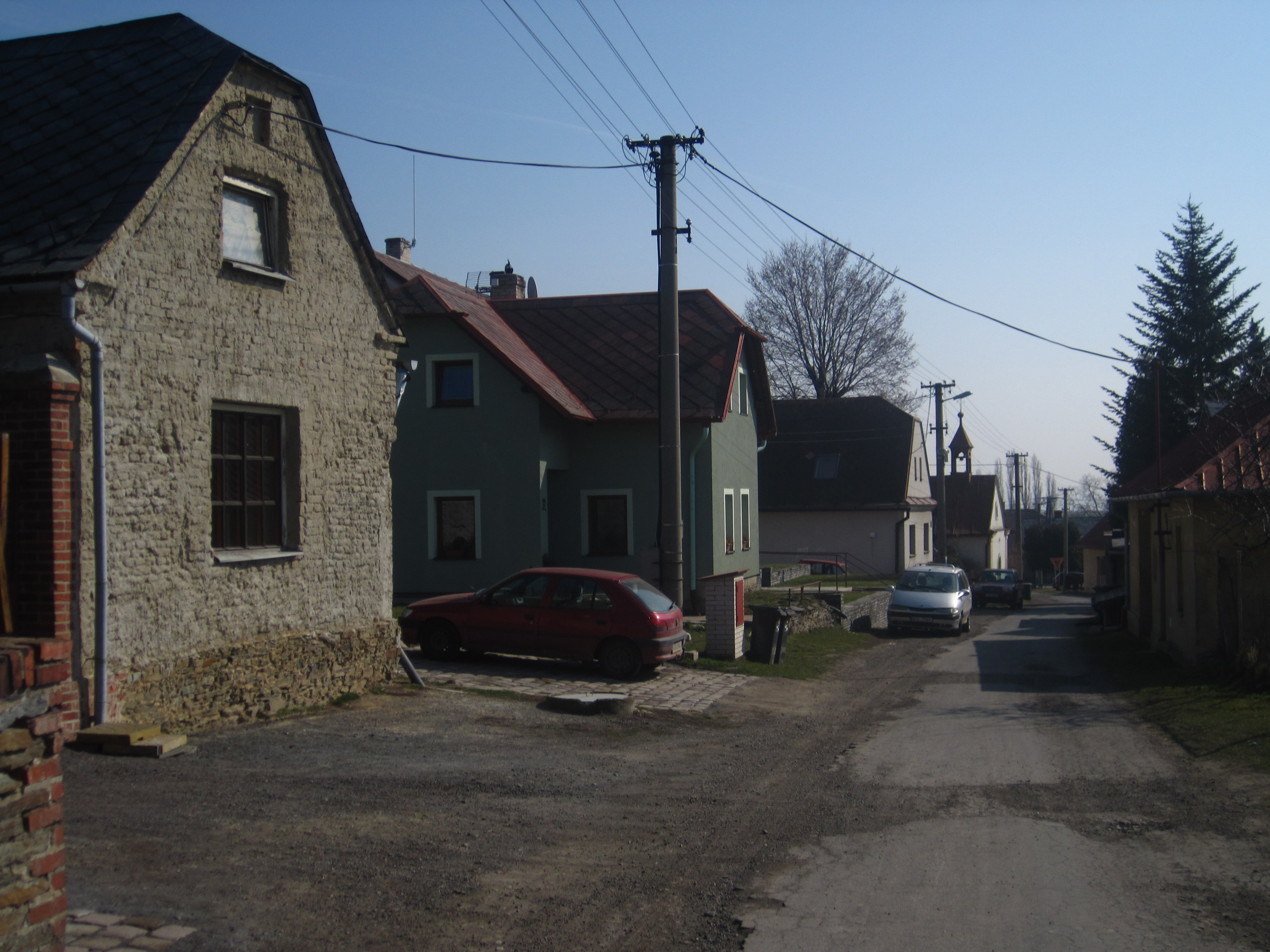
- View towards the chapel

- Flag Coat of arms

- Location in the Czech Republic
- Coordinates: 49°55′57″N 17°41′15″E
- Country: Czech Republic
- Region: Moravian-Silesian
- District: Opava
- First mentioned: 1265

Area
  - Total: 3.74 km^{2} (1.44 sq mi)
- Elevation: 414 m (1,358 ft)

Population (2026-01-01)
  - Total: 162
  - Density: 43.3/km^{2} (112/sq mi)
- Time zone: UTC+1 (CET)
  - Summer (DST): UTC+2 (CEST)
- Postal code: 747 52
- Website: www.bratrikovice.cz

Bratříkovice (German: Brättersdorf) is a municipality and village in Opava District in the Moravian-Silesian Region of the Czech Republic. It has about 200 inhabitants.

== Geography ==
Bratříkovice is located about 15 kilometres (9 mi) west of Opava. It lies in the Nízký Jeseník mountain range.

== Demographics ==
Historical population
Year	Pop.	±%
1869	481	—
1880	479	−0.4%
1890	416	−13.2%
1900	374	−10.1%
1910	351	−6.1%
1921	326	−7.1%
1930	303	−7.1%
1950	216	−28.7%
1961	201	−6.9%
1970	183	−9.0%
1980	151	−17.5%
1991	133	−11.9%
2001	164	+23.3%
2011	162	−1.2%
2021	157	−3.1%
Source: Censuses
