= Větřkovice =

- Municipality
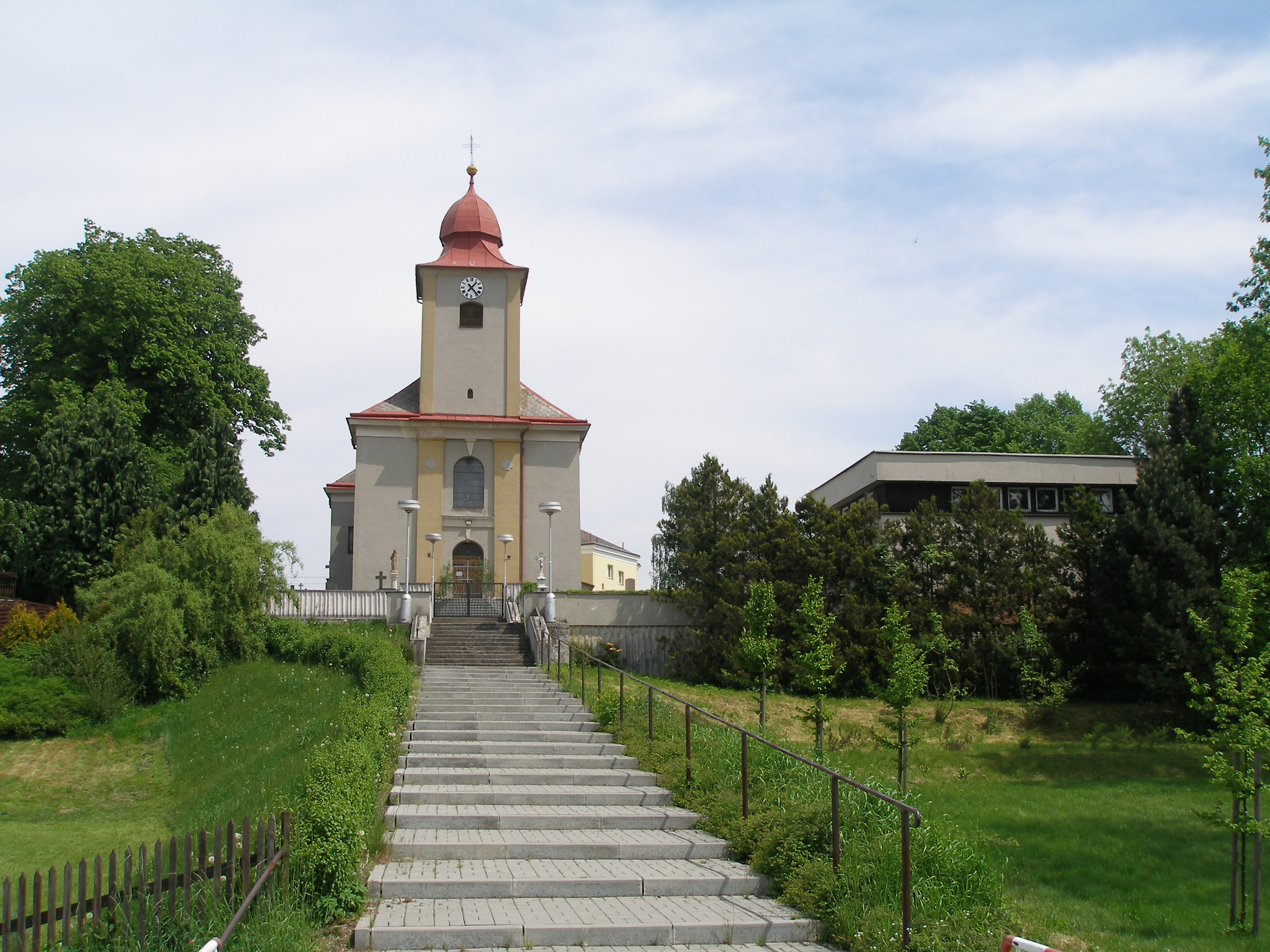
- Church of the Assumption of the Virgin Mary

- Flag Coat of arms

- Location in the Czech Republic
- Coordinates: 49°46′50″N 17°49′14″E
- Country: Czech Republic
- Region: Moravian-Silesian
- District: Opava
- Founded: 1298

Area
  - Total: 17.84 km^{2} (6.89 sq mi)
- Elevation: 462 m (1,516 ft)

Population (2026-01-01)
  - Total: 793
  - Density: 44.5/km^{2} (115/sq mi)
- Time zone: UTC+1 (CET)
  - Summer (DST): UTC+2 (CEST)
- Postal code: 747 43
- Website: www.vetrkovice.cz

Větřkovice is a municipality and village in Opava District in the Moravian-Silesian Region of the Czech Republic. It has about 800 inhabitants.

== Administrative division ==
Větřkovice consists of two municipal parts (in brackets population according to the 2021 census):

- Větřkovice (678)
- Nové Vrbno (25)

== History ==
Větřkovice was founded in 1298 and belongs among the few settlements that have preserved the foundation charter.

== Demographics ==
Historical population
Year	Pop.	±%
1869	811	—
1880	926	+14.2%
1890	859	−7.2%
1900	827	−3.7%
1910	859	+3.9%
1921	869	+1.2%
1930	839	−3.5%
1950	584	−30.4%
1961	641	+9.8%
1970	640	−0.2%
1980	728	+13.7%
1991	799	+9.8%
2001	780	−2.4%
2011	730	−6.4%
2021	703	−3.7%
Source: Censuses
