= Rohov (Opava District) =

- Municipality
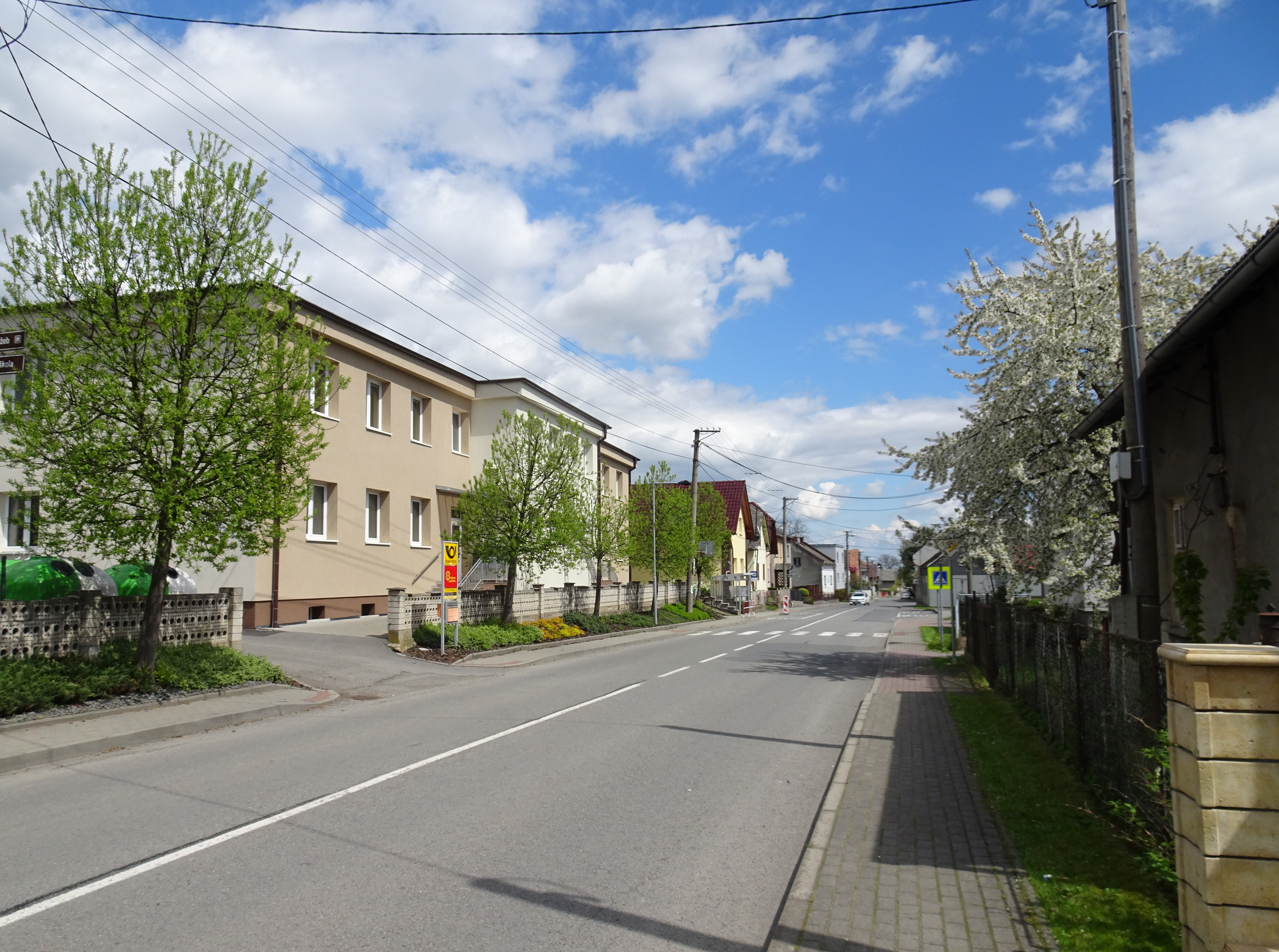
- Main street

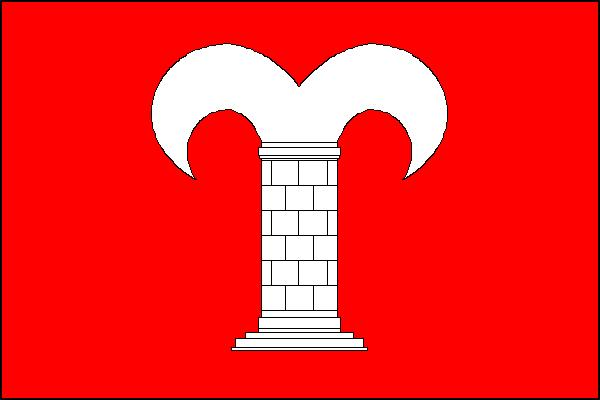
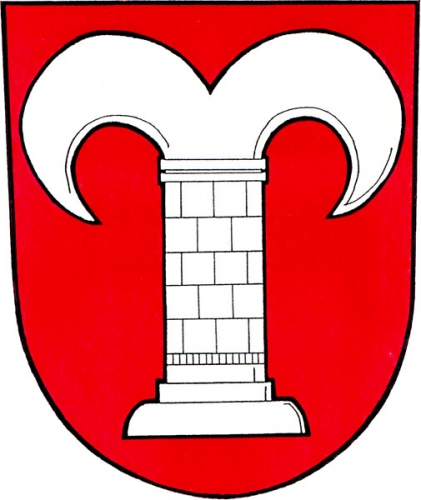
- Flag Coat of arms

- Location in the Czech Republic
- Coordinates: 50°0′56″N 18°4′17″E
- Country: Czech Republic
- Region: Moravian-Silesian
- District: Opava
- First mentioned: 1349

Area
  - Total: 6.64 km^{2} (2.56 sq mi)
- Elevation: 239 m (784 ft)

Population (2026-01-01)
  - Total: 582
  - Density: 87.7/km^{2} (227/sq mi)
- Time zone: UTC+1 (CET)
  - Summer (DST): UTC+2 (CEST)
- Postal code: 747 25
- Website: www.rohov.cz

Rohov (German: Rohow) is a municipality and village in Opava District in the Moravian-Silesian Region of the Czech Republic. It has about 600 inhabitants. It is part of the historic Hlučín Region.

== History ==
The first written mention of Rohov is from 1349.

== Demographics ==
Historical population
| Year | Pop. | ±% |
|---|---|---|
| 1869 | 659 | — |
| 1880 | 656 | −0.5% |
| 1890 | 683 | +4.1% |
| 1900 | 675 | −1.2% |
| 1910 | 702 | +4.0% |
| 1921 | 709 | +1.0% |
| 1930 | 607 | −14.4% |
| 1950 | 538 | −11.4% |
| 1961 | 646 | +20.1% |
| 1970 | 626 | −3.1% |
| 1980 | 641 | +2.4% |
| 1991 | 592 | −7.6% |
| 2001 | 609 | +2.9% |
| 2011 | 618 | +1.5% |
| 2021 | 598 | −3.2% |
Source: Censuses
