= Sosnová (Opava District) =

- Municipality
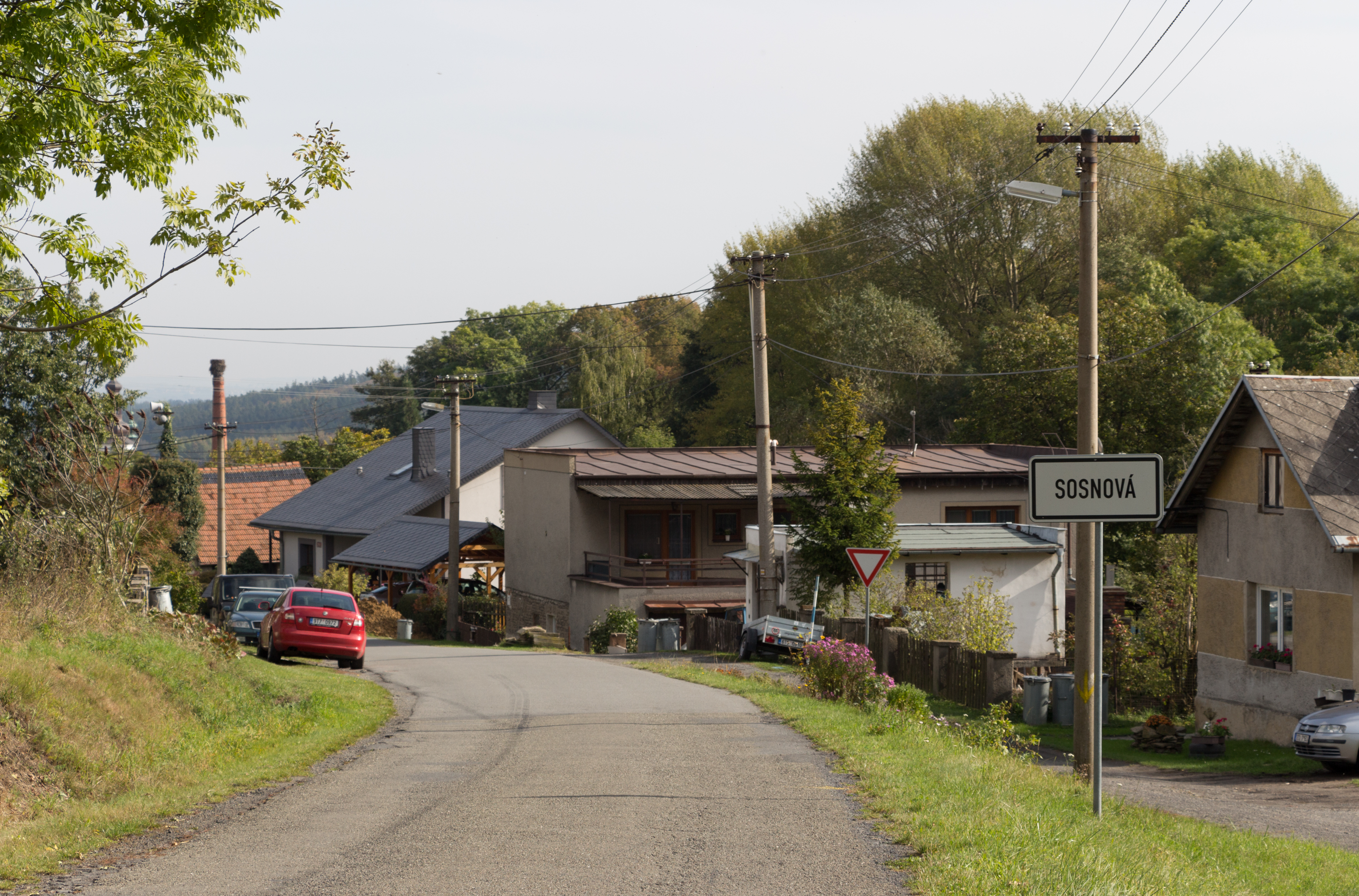
- Entrance to Sosnová

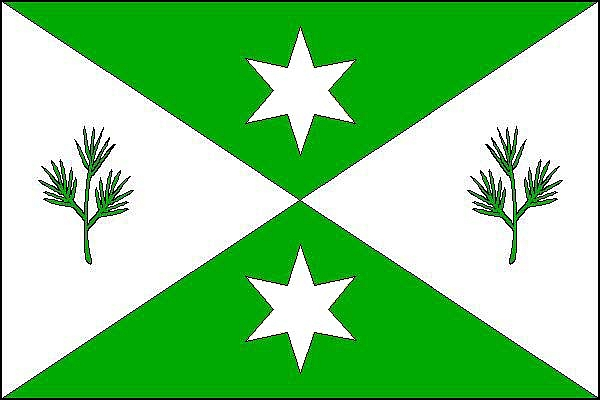
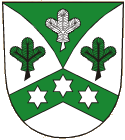
- Flag Coat of arms

- Location in the Czech Republic
- Coordinates: 49°59′55″N 17°39′47″E
- Country: Czech Republic
- Region: Moravian-Silesian
- District: Opava
- First mentioned: 1377

Area
  - Total: 13.04 km^{2} (5.03 sq mi)
- Elevation: 262 m (860 ft)

Population (2026-01-01)
  - Total: 416
  - Density: 31.9/km^{2} (82.6/sq mi)
- Time zone: UTC+1 (CET)
  - Summer (DST): UTC+2 (CEST)
- Postal code: 793 12
- Website: www.sosnova.cz

Sosnová (German: Zossen) is a municipality and village in Opava District in the Moravian-Silesian Region of the Czech Republic. It has about 400 inhabitants.

== History ==
The first written mention of Sosnová is from 1377.

== Demographics ==
Historical population
| Year | Pop. | ±% |
|---|---|---|
| 1869 | 1,005 | — |
| 1880 | 992 | −1.3% |
| 1890 | 1,013 | +2.1% |
| 1900 | 930 | −8.2% |
| 1910 | 832 | −10.5% |
| 1921 | 814 | −2.2% |
| 1930 | 857 | +5.3% |
| 1950 | 425 | −50.4% |
| 1961 | 485 | +14.1% |
| 1970 | 458 | −5.6% |
| 1980 | 455 | −0.7% |
| 1991 | 409 | −10.1% |
| 2001 | 419 | +2.4% |
| 2011 | 399 | −4.8% |
| 2021 | 387 | −3.0% |
Source: Censuses
