= Těškovice =

- Municipality
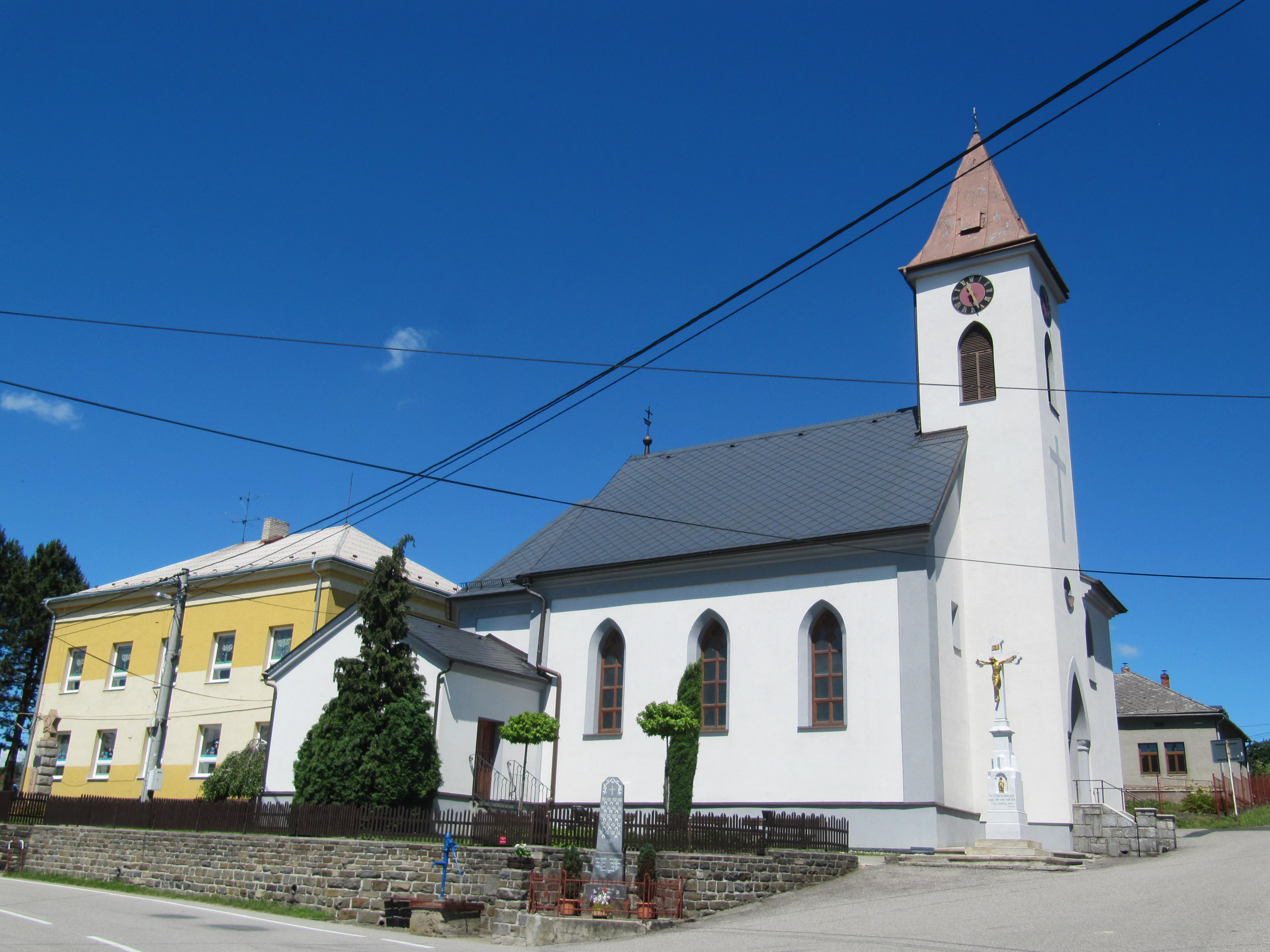
- Church of the Assumption of the Virgin Mary

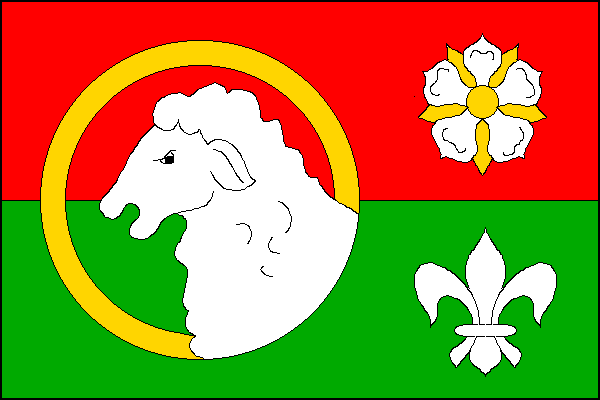
- Flag Coat of arms

- Location in the Czech Republic
- Coordinates: 49°48′51″N 18°1′15″E
- Country: Czech Republic
- Region: Moravian-Silesian
- District: Opava
- First mentioned: 1377

Area
  - Total: 9.17 km^{2} (3.54 sq mi)
- Elevation: 434 m (1,424 ft)

Population (2026-01-01)
  - Total: 817
  - Density: 89.1/km^{2} (231/sq mi)
- Time zone: UTC+1 (CET)
  - Summer (DST): UTC+2 (CEST)
- Postal code: 747 64
- Website: www.teskovice.cz

Těškovice is a municipality and village in Opava District in the Moravian-Silesian Region of the Czech Republic. It has about 800 inhabitants.

== History ==
The first written mention of Těškovice is from 1377. The village was probably founded at the turn of the 12th and 13th centuries.

== Demographics ==
Historical population
Year	Pop.	±%
1869	638	—
1880	691	+8.3%
1890	707	+2.3%
1900	814	+15.1%
1910	892	+9.6%
1921	748	−16.1%
1930	748	+0.0%
1950	678	−9.4%
1961	800	+18.0%
1970	817	+2.1%
1980	887	+8.6%
1991	883	−0.5%
2001	880	−0.3%
2011	834	−5.2%
2021	800	−4.1%
Source: Censuses
