= Uhlířov =

- Municipality
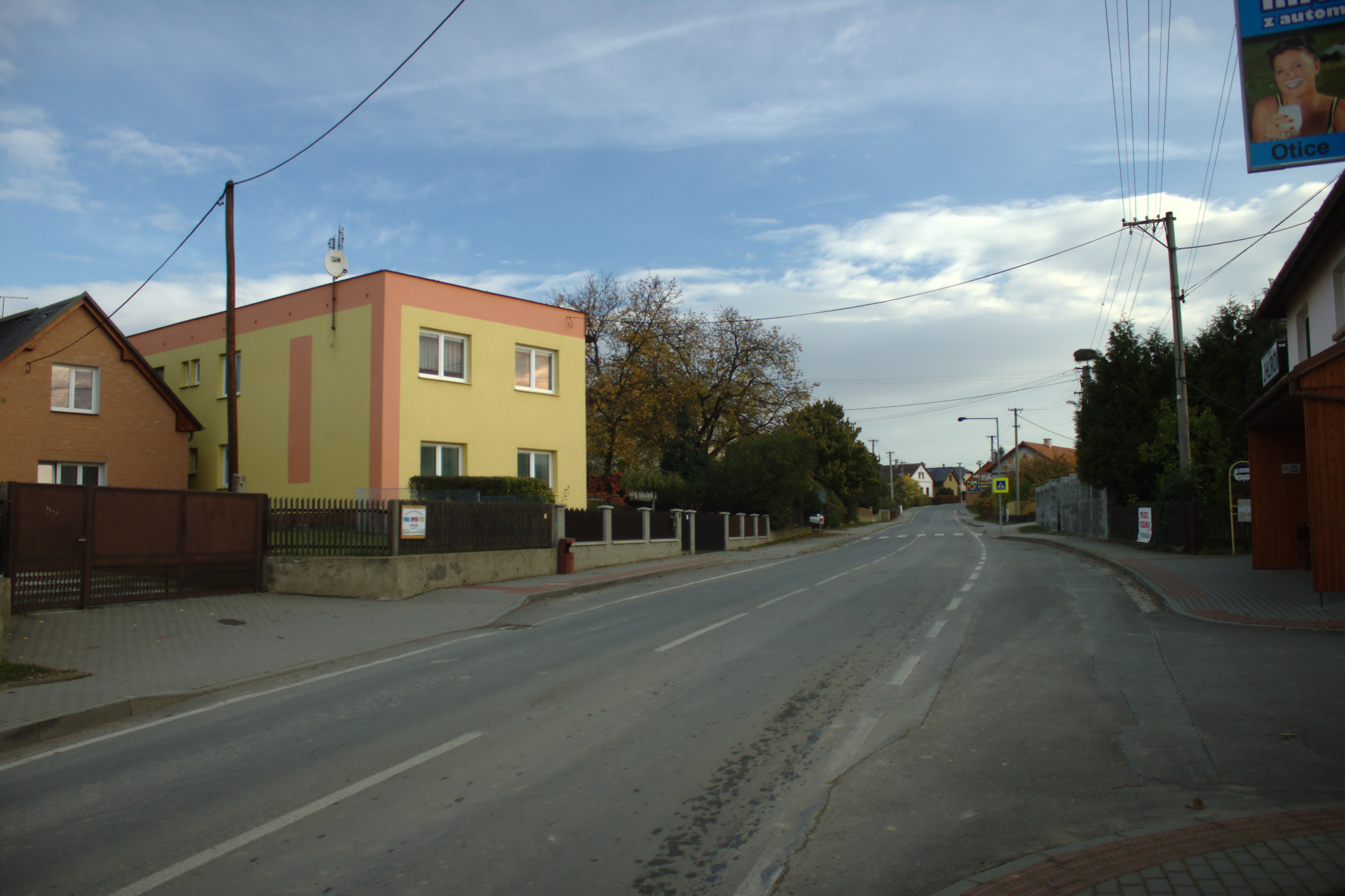
- Main road

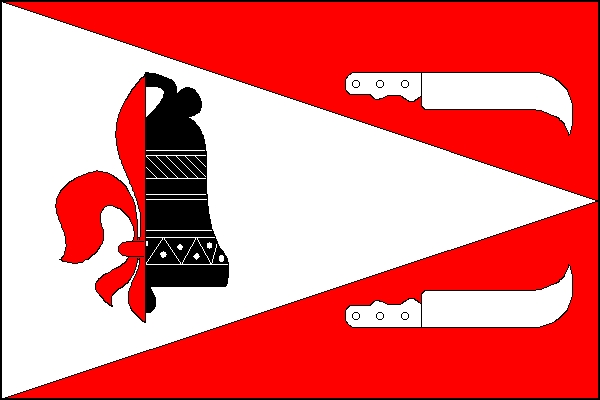
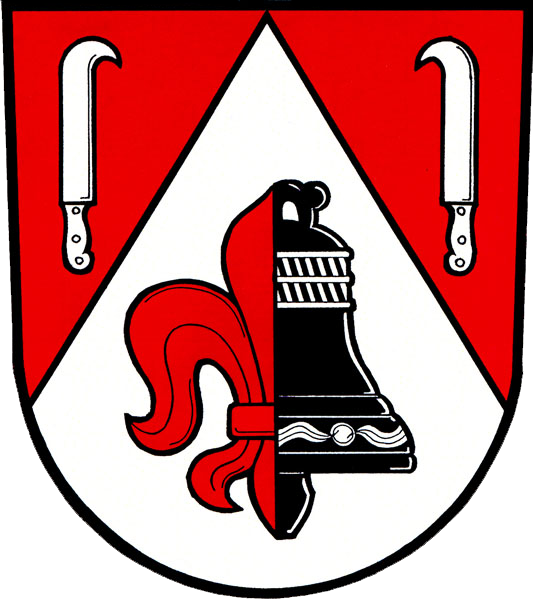
- Flag Coat of arms

- Location in the Czech Republic
- Coordinates: 49°53′49″N 17°50′29″E
- Country: Czech Republic
- Region: Moravian-Silesian
- District: Opava
- First mentioned: 1389

Area
  - Total: 3.87 km^{2} (1.49 sq mi)
- Elevation: 298 m (978 ft)

Population (2026-01-01)
  - Total: 416
  - Density: 107/km^{2} (278/sq mi)
- Time zone: UTC+1 (CET)
  - Summer (DST): UTC+2 (CEST)
- Postal code: 747 84
- Website: www.uhlirov.cz

Uhlířov (German: Köhlersdorf) is a municipality and village in Opava District in the Moravian-Silesian Region of the Czech Republic. It has about 400 inhabitants.

== History ==
The first written mention of Uhlířov is from 1389.

== Demographics ==
Historical population
Year	Pop.	±%
1869	284	—
1880	285	+0.4%
1890	337	+18.2%
1900	341	+1.2%
1910	342	+0.3%
1921	341	−0.3%
1930	335	−1.8%
1950	252	−24.8%
1961	327	+29.8%
1970	300	−8.3%
1980	315	+5.0%
1991	336	+6.7%
2001	357	+6.2%
2011	331	−7.3%
2021	360	+8.8%
Source: Censuses
