= Budišovice =

- Municipality
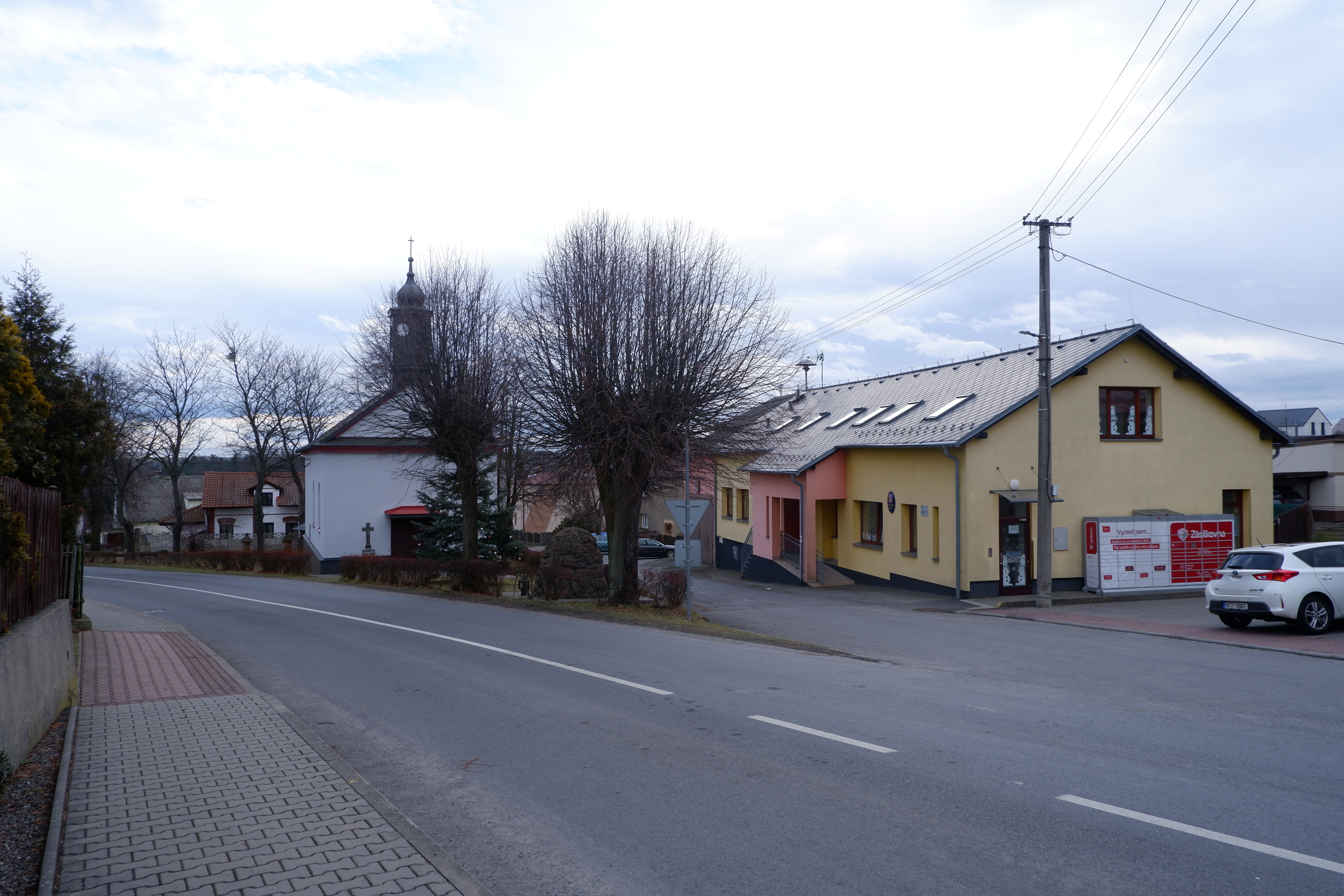
- Centre of Budišovice

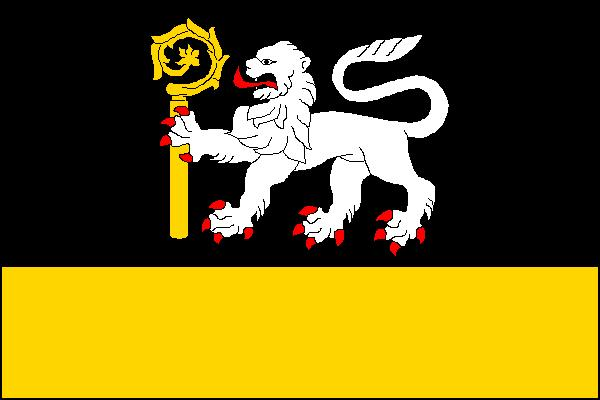
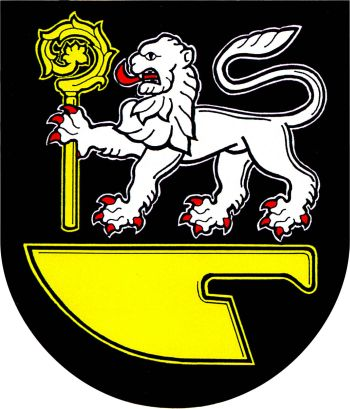
- Flag Coat of arms

- Location in the Czech Republic
- Coordinates: 49°51′41″N 18°2′23″E
- Country: Czech Republic
- Region: Moravian-Silesian
- District: Opava
- First mentioned: 1282

Area
  - Total: 7.01 km^{2} (2.71 sq mi)
- Elevation: 383 m (1,257 ft)

Population (2026-01-01)
  - Total: 811
  - Density: 116/km^{2} (300/sq mi)
- Time zone: UTC+1 (CET)
  - Summer (DST): UTC+2 (CEST)
- Postal code: 747 64
- Website: www.budisovice.cz

Budišovice is a municipality and village in Opava District in the Moravian-Silesian Region of the Czech Republic. It has about 800 inhabitants.

== History ==
The first written mention of Budišovice is from 1282.

== Demographics ==
Historical population
Year	Pop.	±%
1869	355	—
1880	315	−11.3%
1890	341	+8.3%
1900	380	+11.4%
1910	408	+7.4%
1921	374	−8.3%
1930	425	+13.6%
1950	368	−13.4%
1961	421	+14.4%
1970	401	−4.8%
1980	405	+1.0%
1991	417	+3.0%
2001	451	+8.2%
2011	674	+49.4%
2021	769	+14.1%
Source: Censuses
