= Mladecko =

- Municipality
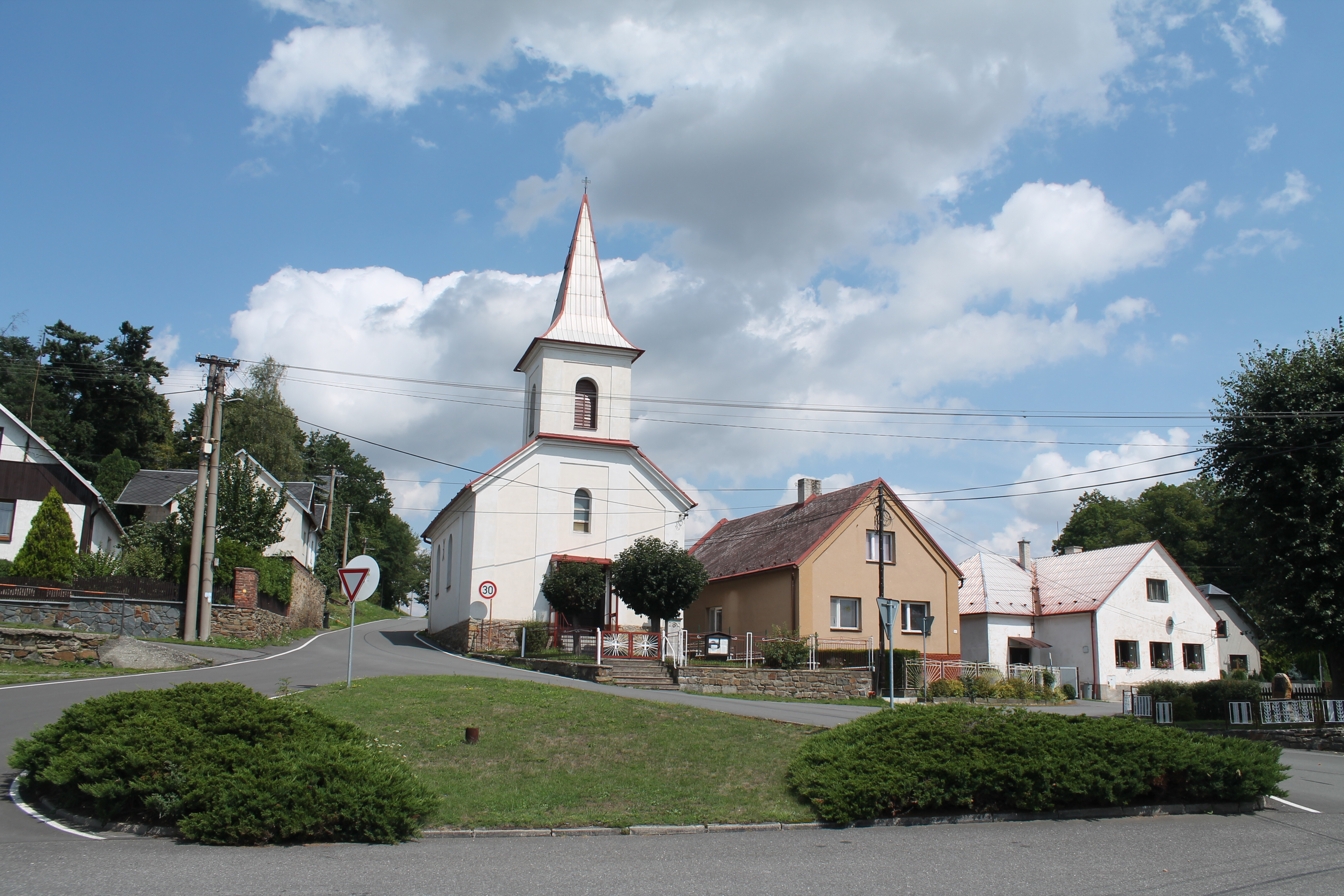
- Centre of Mladecko

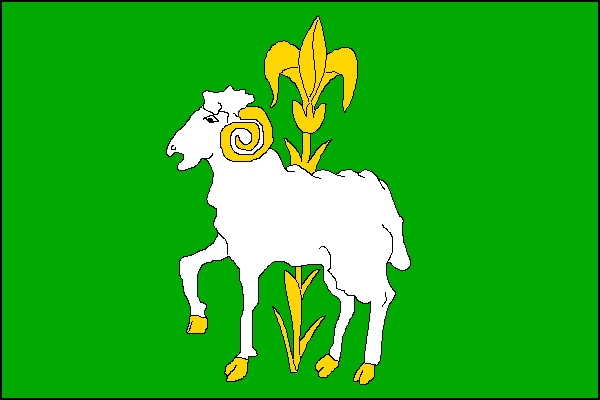
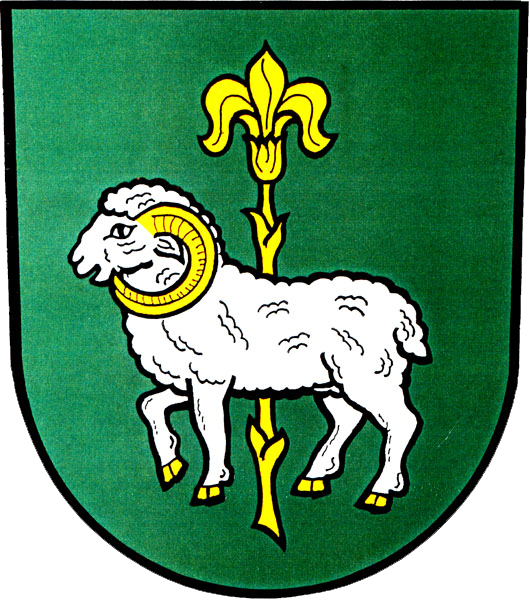
- Flag Coat of arms

- Location in the Czech Republic
- Coordinates: 49°53′54″N 17°42′30″E
- Country: Czech Republic
- Region: Moravian-Silesian
- District: Opava
- First mentioned: 1250

Area
  - Total: 2.65 km^{2} (1.02 sq mi)
- Elevation: 334 m (1,096 ft)

Population (2026-01-01)
  - Total: 157
  - Density: 59.2/km^{2} (153/sq mi)
- Time zone: UTC+1 (CET)
  - Summer (DST): UTC+2 (CEST)
- Postal code: 747 54
- Website: www.mladecko.cz

Mladecko is a municipality and village in Opava District in the Moravian-Silesian Region of the Czech Republic. It has about 200 inhabitants.

== History ==
The first written mention of Mladecko is from 1250.

== Demographics ==
Historical population
Year	Pop.	±%
1869	352	—
1880	330	−6.2%
1890	357	+8.2%
1900	415	+16.2%
1910	369	−11.1%
1921	324	−12.2%
1930	319	−1.5%
1950	245	−23.2%
1961	263	+7.3%
1970	234	−11.0%
1980	189	−19.2%
1991	159	−15.9%
2001	164	+3.1%
2011	149	−9.1%
2021	135	−9.4%
Source: Censuses
