= Staré Těchanovice =

- Municipality
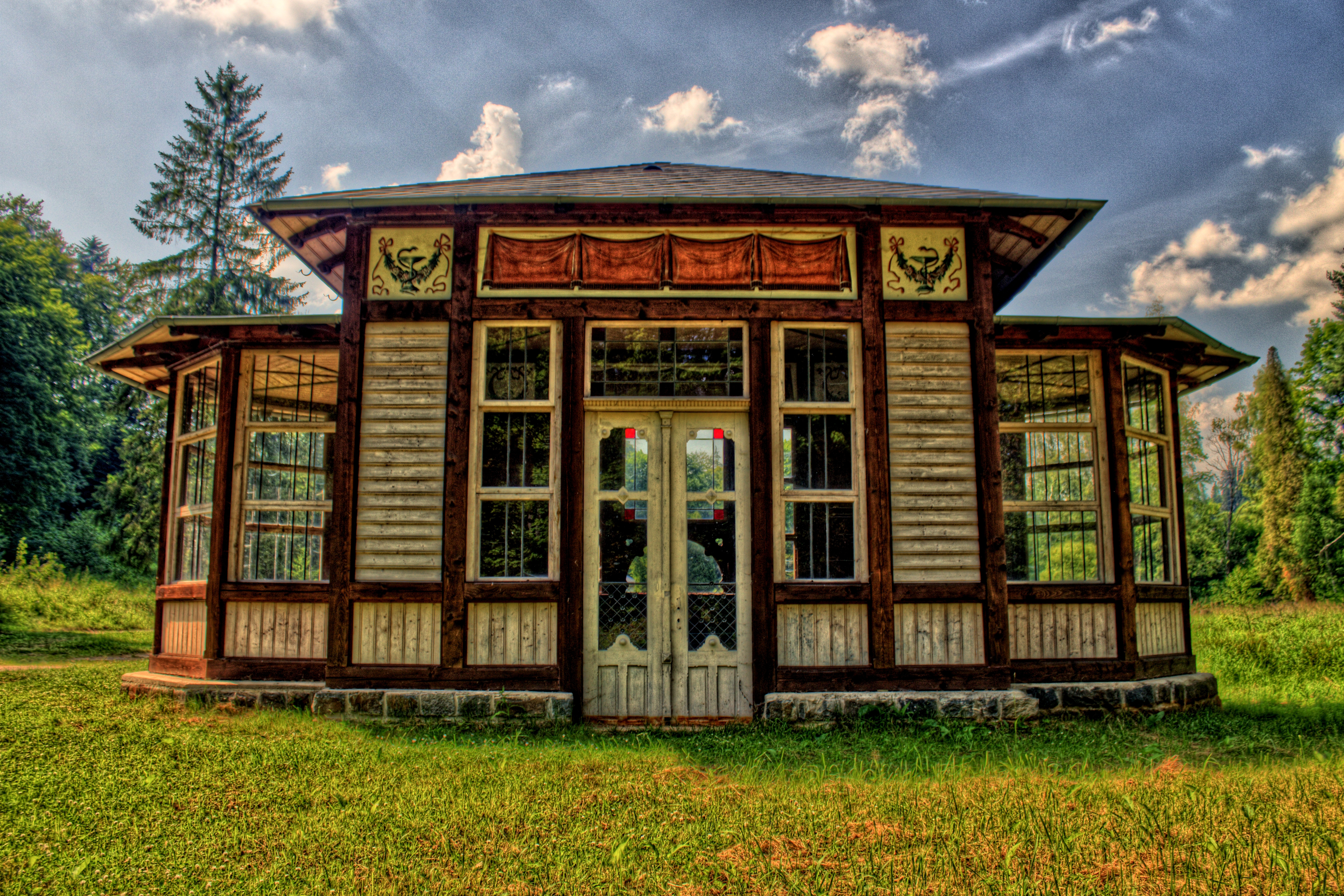
- Spa building in Jánské Koupele

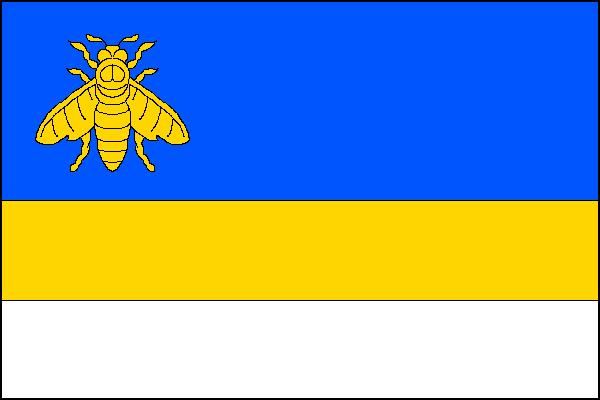
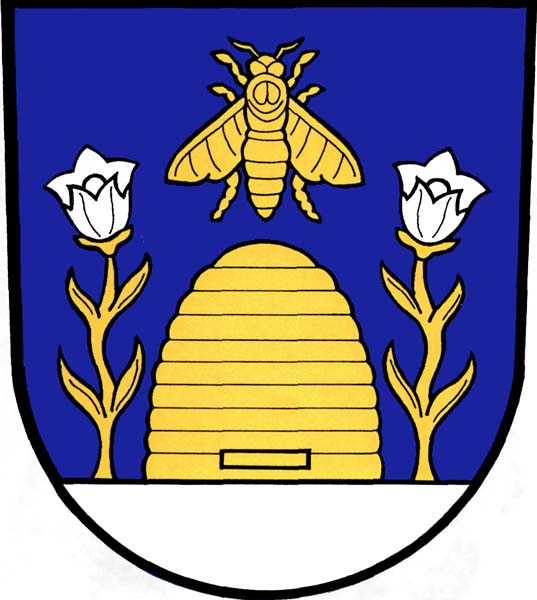
- Flag Coat of arms

- Location in the Czech Republic
- Coordinates: 49°49′6″N 17°41′31″E
- Country: Czech Republic
- Region: Moravian-Silesian
- District: Opava
- First mentioned: 1349

Area
  - Total: 7.49 km^{2} (2.89 sq mi)
- Elevation: 480 m (1,570 ft)

Population (2026-01-01)
  - Total: 130
  - Density: 17/km^{2} (45/sq mi)
- Time zone: UTC+1 (CET)
  - Summer (DST): UTC+2 (CEST)
- Postal code: 749 01
- Website: www.staretechanovice.cz

Staré Těchanovice (German: Alt Zechsdorf) is a municipality and village in Opava District in the Moravian-Silesian Region of the Czech Republic. It has about 100 inhabitants.

== Administrative division ==
Staré Těchanovice consists of two municipal parts (in brackets population according to the 2021 census):

- Staré Těchanovice (126)
- Jánské Koupele (0)

== History ==
The first written mention of Staré Těchanovice is from 1377.

== Demographics ==
Historical population
Year	Pop.	±%
1869	479	—
1880	486	+1.5%
1890	461	−5.1%
1900	461	+0.0%
1910	433	−6.1%
1921	412	−4.8%
1930	382	−7.3%
1950	263	−31.2%
1961	234	−11.0%
1970	174	−25.6%
1980	135	−22.4%
1991	136	+0.7%
2001	138	+1.5%
2011	155	+12.3%
2021	126	−18.7%
Source: Censuses
