= Dobroslavice =

- Municipality
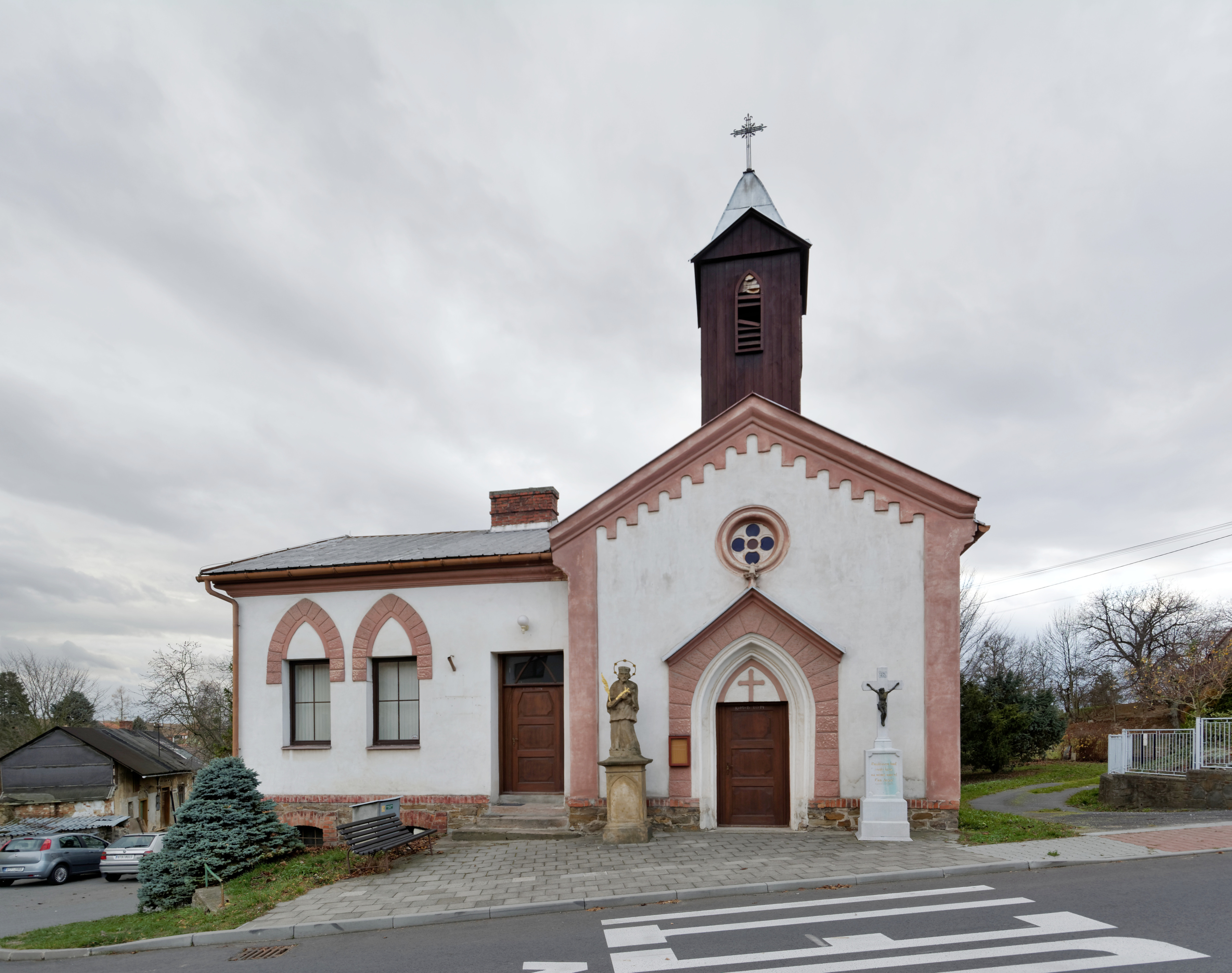
- Chapel of Saint John of Nepomuk and former municipal office

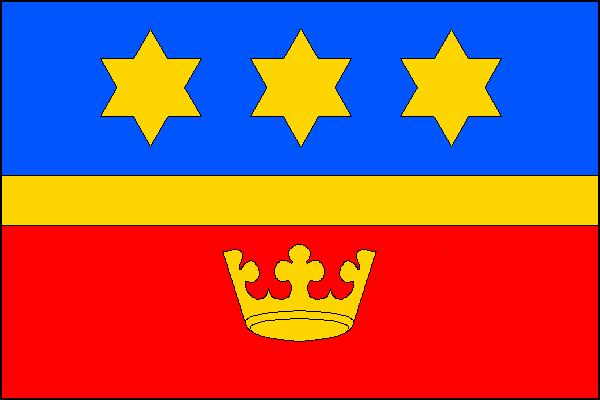
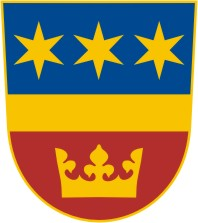
- Flag Coat of arms

- Location in the Czech Republic
- Coordinates: 49°52′49″N 18°8′27″E
- Country: Czech Republic
- Region: Moravian-Silesian
- District: Opava
- First mentioned: 1377

Area
  - Total: 7.24 km^{2} (2.80 sq mi)
- Elevation: 308 m (1,010 ft)

Population (2026-01-01)
  - Total: 802
  - Density: 111/km^{2} (287/sq mi)
- Time zone: UTC+1 (CET)
  - Summer (DST): UTC+2 (CEST)
- Postal code: 747 94
- Website: dobroslavice.cz

Dobroslavice (German: Dobroslawitz is a municipality and village in Opava District in the Moravian-Silesian Region of the Czech Republic. It has about 800 inhabitants.

== History ==
The first written mention of Dobroslavice is from 1377.

== Demographics ==
Historical population
Year	Pop.	±%
1869	379	—
1880	426	+12.4%
1890	477	+12.0%
1900	460	−3.6%
1910	546	+18.7%
1921	493	−9.7%
1930	509	+3.2%
1950	380	−25.3%
1961	494	+30.0%
1970	535	+8.3%
1980	667	+24.7%
1991	672	+0.7%
2001	694	+3.3%
2011	751	+8.2%
2021	754	+0.4%
Source: Censuses
