= Opava District =

Opava District Okres Opava
- District
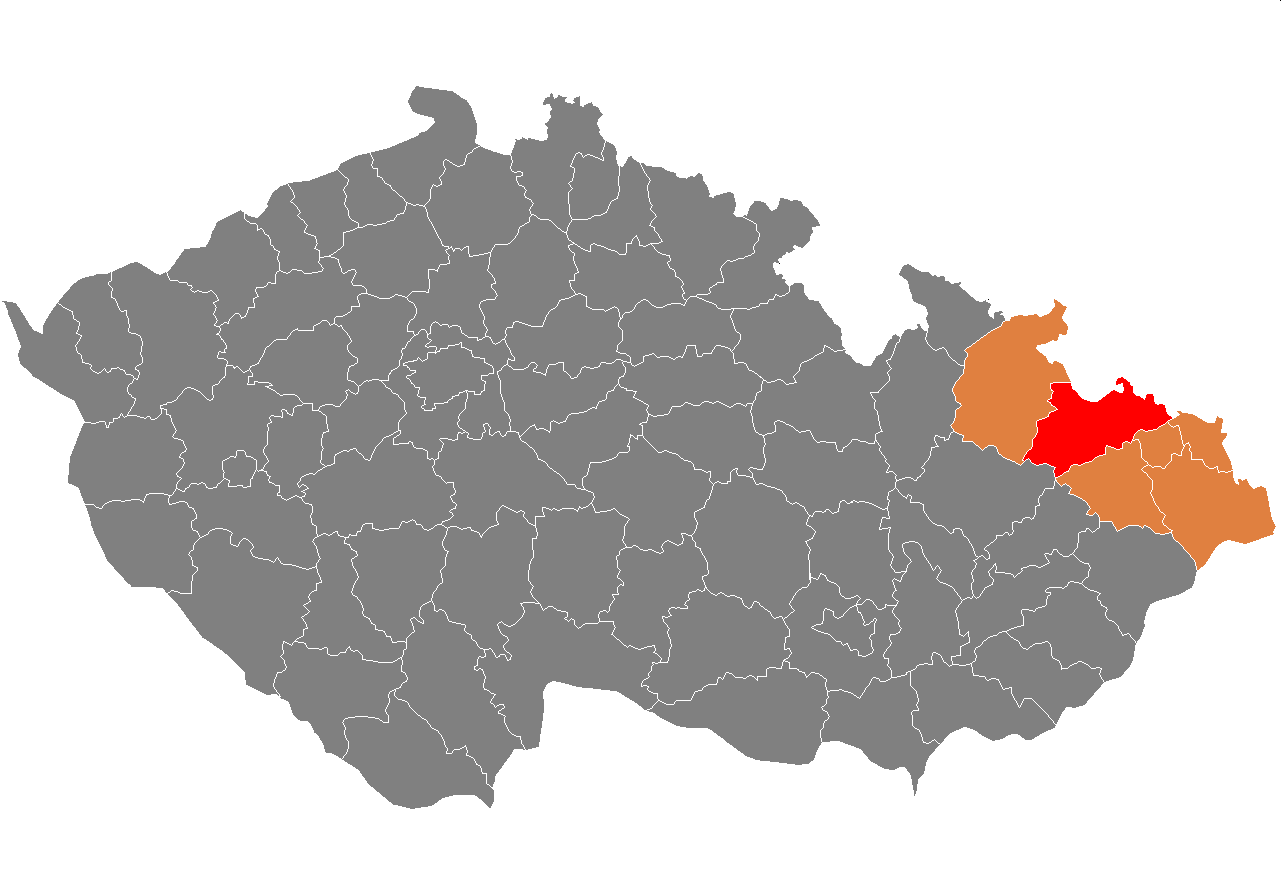
- Location in the Moravian-Silesian Region within the Czech Republic
- Coordinates: 49°53′N 17°53′E
- Country: Czech Republic
- Region: Moravian-Silesian
- Capital: Opava

Area
  - Total: 1,115.87 km^{2} (430.84 sq mi)

Population (2026)
  - Total: 173,864
  - Density: 155.810/km^{2} (403.547/sq mi)
- Time zone: UTC+1 (CET)
  - Summer (DST): UTC+2 (CEST)
- Municipalities: 77
- * Towns: 7
- * Market towns: 2

Opava District (Czech: okres Opava) is a district in the Moravian-Silesian Region of the Czech Republic. Its capital is the city of Opava.

== Administrative division ==
Opava District is divided into four administrative districts of municipalities with extended competence: Opava, Hlučín, Kravaře and Vítkov.

=== List of municipalities ===
Cities and towns are marked in bold and market towns in italics:

Bělá - Bohuslavice - Bolatice - Branka u Opavy - Bratříkovice - Březová - Brumovice - Budišov nad Budišovkou - Budišovice - Čermná ve Slezsku - Chlebičov - Chuchelná - Chvalíkovice - Darkovice - Děhylov - Dobroslavice - Dolní Benešov - Dolní Životice - Háj ve Slezsku - Hať - Hlavnice - Hlubočec - Hlučín - Hněvošice - Holasovice - Hrabyně - Hradec nad Moravicí - Jakartovice - Jezdkovice - Kobeřice - Kozmice - Kravaře - Kružberk - Kyjovice - Lhotka u Litultovic - Litultovice - Ludgeřovice - Markvartovice - Melč - Mikolajice - Mladecko - Mokré Lazce - Moravice - Neplachovice - Nové Lublice - Nové Sedlice - Oldřišov - Opava - Otice - Píšť - Pustá Polom - Radkov - Raduň - Rohov - Šilheřovice - Skřipov - Slavkov - Služovice - Sosnová - Štáblovice - Staré Těchanovice - Stěbořice - Štěpánkovice - Štítina - Strahovice - Sudice - Svatoňovice - Těškovice - Třebom - Uhlířov - Velké Heraltice - Velké Hoštice - Větřkovice - Vítkov - Vřesina - Vršovice - Závada

== Geography ==
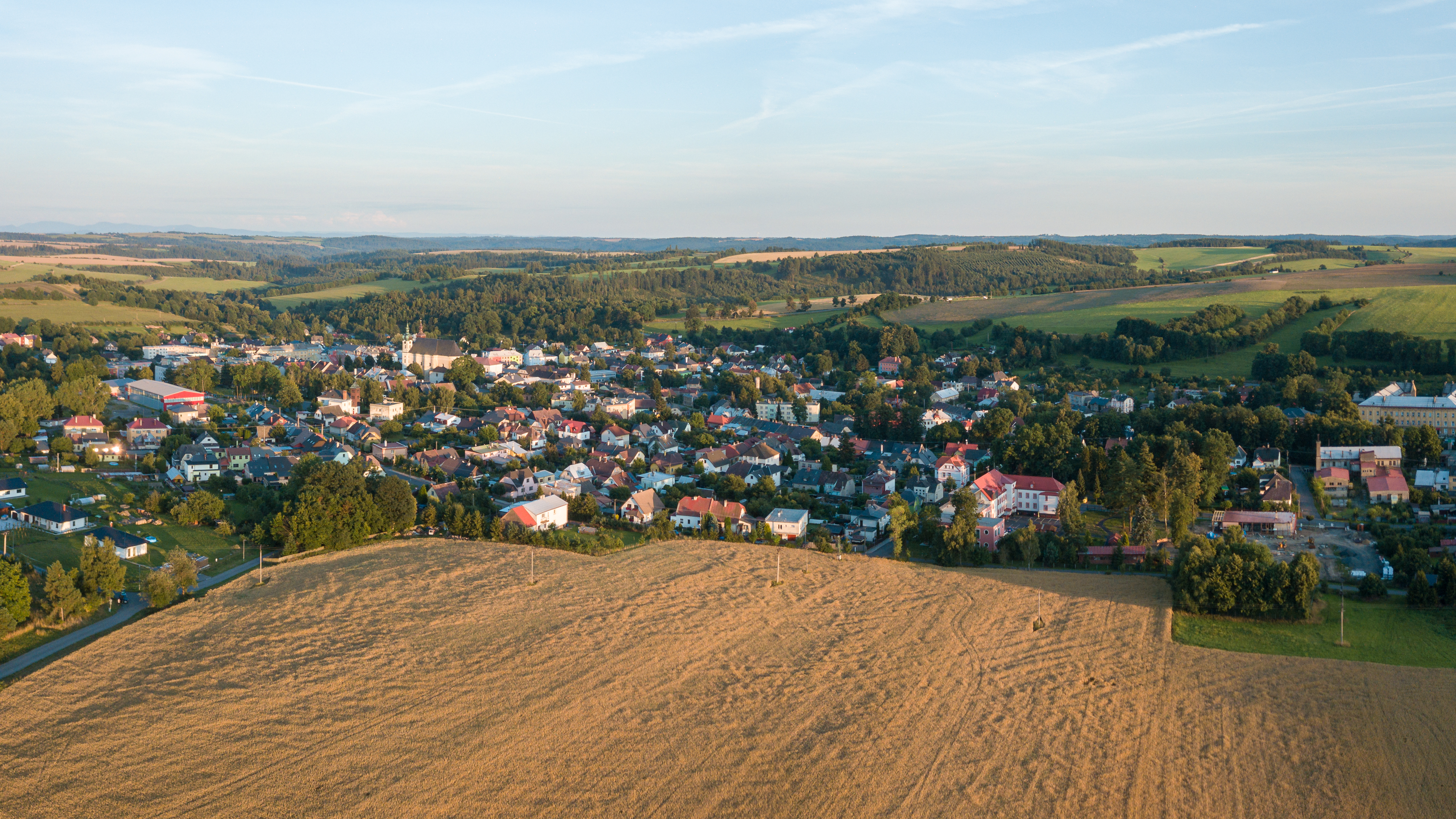
Budišov nad Budišovkou and surrounding landscape

Opava District borders Poland in the north. The territory is hilly, but the average altitude is low. The territory extends into three geomorphological mesoregions: Nízký Jeseník (west and south), Opava Hilly Land (east and north), and Ostrava Basin (a small part in the northeast). The highest point of the district is the hill Červená hora in Budišov nad Budišovkou with an elevation of 749 m (2,457 ft). The lowest point of the district is the river bed of the Oder in Šilheřovice at 198 m (650 ft).

From the total district area of 1,115.9 km^{2} (430.9 sq mi), agricultural land occupies 682.2 km^{2} (263.4 sq mi), forests occupy 312.5 km^{2} (120.7 sq mi), and water area occupies 19.0 km^{2} (7.3 sq mi). Forests cover 28.0% of the district's area.

The entire district is drained by the Oder River, but this river appears in the territory only briefly. The most important rivers of the district are the Opava, which flows across the district from northwest to east, and the Moravice, which enters the district in the west and joins the Opava near the city of Opava. The largest body of water is Kružberk Reservoir, built on the Moravice.

There are no large-scale protected areas.

== Demographics ==
Historical population

Year	Pop.	±%
1869	115,560	—
1880	125,364	+8.5%
1890	132,321	+5.5%
1900	141,959	+7.3%
1910	149,943	+5.6%

Year	Pop.	±%
1921	152,943	+2.0%
1930	161,971	+5.9%
1950	130,606	−19.4%
1961	153,562	+17.6%
1970	161,085	+4.9%

Year	Pop.	±%
1980	172,981	+7.4%
1991	177,370	+2.5%
2001	177,970	+0.3%
2011	174,901	−1.7%
2021	171,502	−1.9%

Source: Censuses

=== Most populous municipalities ===
Name	Population	Area (km^{2})
Opava	54,881	91
Hlučín	13,245	21
Kravaře	6,691	19
Hradec nad Moravicí	5,444	44
Vítkov	5,430	55
Ludgeřovice	4,959	11
Bolatice	4,508	13
Dolní Benešov	3,824	15
Háj ve Slezsku	3,241	14
Kobeřice	3,194	17

== Economy ==
The largest employers with headquarters in Opava District and at least 500 employees are:

Economic entity	Location	Number of employees	Main activity
Silesian Hospital in Opava	Opava	1,500–1,999	Health care
Brano	Hradec nad Moravicí	1,000–1,499	Automotive industry
Model Obaly	Opava	1,000–1,499	Manufacture of paperboard packaging
Teva Czech Industries	Opava	1,000–1,499	Manufacture of pharmaceutical products
City of Opava	Opava	500–999	Public administration
Isotra	Opava	500–999	Manufacture of window blinds
Ostroj	Opava	500–999	Manufacture of machinery for mining
Psychiatric Hospital in Opava	Opava	500–999	Health care
Silesian University in Opava	Opava	500–999	Education
State Office of Labor Inspection	Opava	500–999	Public administration
TAPI Czech Industries	Opava	500–999	Manufacture of pharmaceutical products
Tempo, obchodní družstvo	Opava	500–999	Retail sale
Witzenmann Opava	Opava	500–999	Treatment and coating of metals

== Transport ==
The D1 motorway from Ostrava to the Czech–Polish border briefly runs along the eastern district border; otherwise there are no motorway passing through the district. The most important road is the I/11 from Ostrava to Bruntál via Opava.

== Sights ==
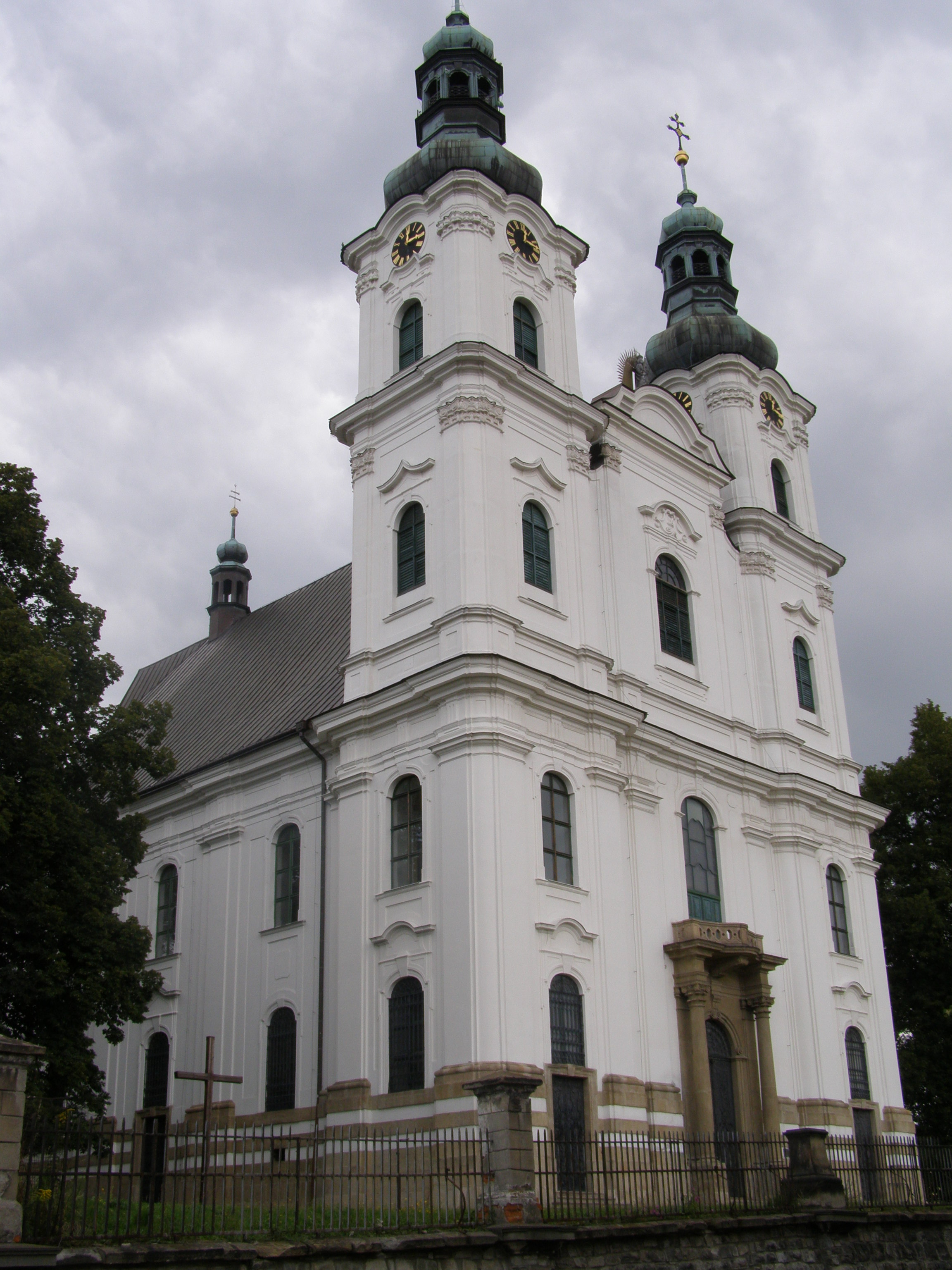
Basilica of the Visitation of Our Lady in Frýdek-Místek

The most important monuments in the district, protected as national cultural monuments, are:

- Chapel of the Holy Cross in Opava
- Co-Cathedral of the Assumption of the Virgin Mary in Opava
- Hradec nad Moravicí Castle
- Petr Bezruč City House of Culture in Opava
- Grave of Jan Zajíc in Vítkov

The best-preserved settlements, protected as monument reservations and monument zones, are:

- Lipina (monument reservation)
- Budišov nad Budišovkou
- Hlučín
- Hradec nad Moravicí
- Opava

The most visited tourist destinations are the Silesian Museum in Opava and Hradec nad Moravicí Castle.
