= Mokré Lazce =

- Municipality
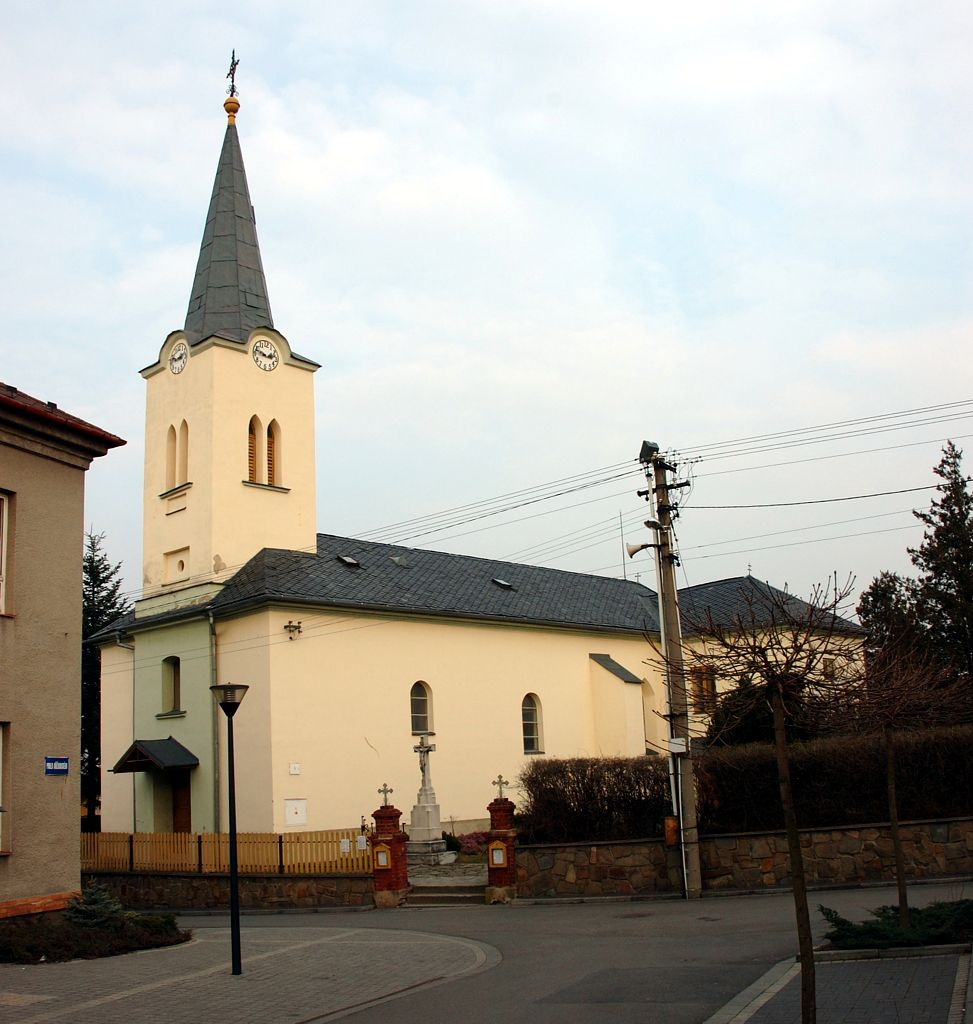
- Church of Saint John the Baptist

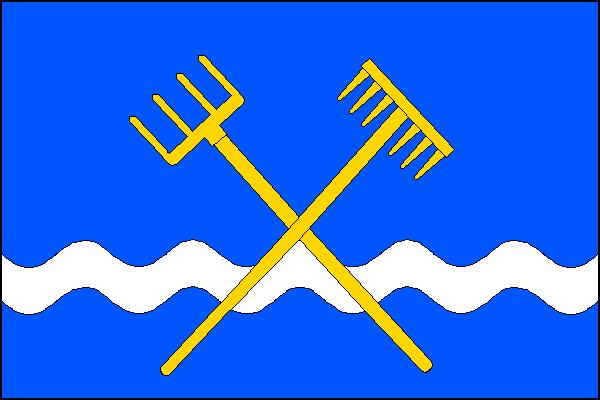
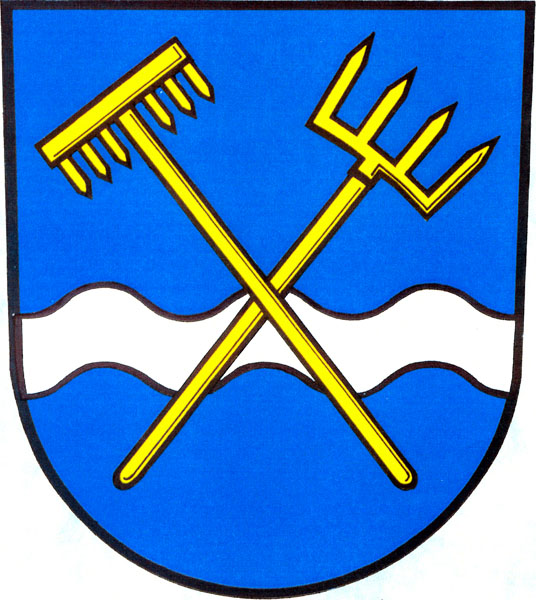
- Flag Coat of arms

- Location in the Czech Republic
- Coordinates: 49°54′17″N 18°1′47″E
- Country: Czech Republic
- Region: Moravian-Silesian
- District: Opava
- First mentioned: 1377

Area
  - Total: 10.55 km^{2} (4.07 sq mi)
- Elevation: 254 m (833 ft)

Population (2026-01-01)
  - Total: 1,144
  - Density: 108.4/km^{2} (280.8/sq mi)
- Time zone: UTC+1 (CET)
  - Summer (DST): UTC+2 (CEST)
- Postal code: 747 62
- Website: www.mokrelazce.cz

Mokré Lazce (German: Mokrolasetz) is a municipality and village in Opava District in the Moravian-Silesian Region of the Czech Republic. It has about 1,100 inhabitants.

== Geography ==
Mokré Lazce is located about 9 kilometres (6 mi) east of Opava and 15 km (9 mi) northwest of Ostrava. The northern part of the municipality lies in the Opava Hilly Land and the southern part lies in the Nízký Jeseník range. The highest point is at 420 m (1,380 ft) above sea level. The municipality is situated on the right bank of the Opava River, which forms the northern municipal border.

== History ==
The first written mention of Mokré Lazce is from 1377. The village was repeatedly sacked during the Thirty Years' War, almost entirely destroyed by fire in 1667 and plundered by Prussian and Austrian soldiers during the wars of the 18th century, but each time it recovered.

== Demographics ==
Historical population

Year	Pop.	±%
1869	858	—
1880	881	+2.7%
1890	906	+2.8%
1900	902	−0.4%
1910	1,040	+15.3%

Year	Pop.	±%
1921	1,047	+0.7%
1930	1,053	+0.6%
1950	849	−19.4%
1961	1,033	+21.7%
1970	994	−3.8%

Year	Pop.	±%
1980	1,053	+5.9%
1991	1,035	−1.7%
2001	1,069	+3.3%
2011	1,086	+1.6%
2021	1,096	+0.9%

Source: Censuses

== Transport ==
The I/11 road from Ostrava to Opava runs through the municipality.

== Sights ==
The main landmark is the Church of Saint John the Baptist. It was built in the Renaissance style probably in 1576 and was further modified in the 19th century.

The Chapel of Saint Anne is a small Baroque building. It dates from 1747.
