= Jezdkovice =

- Municipality
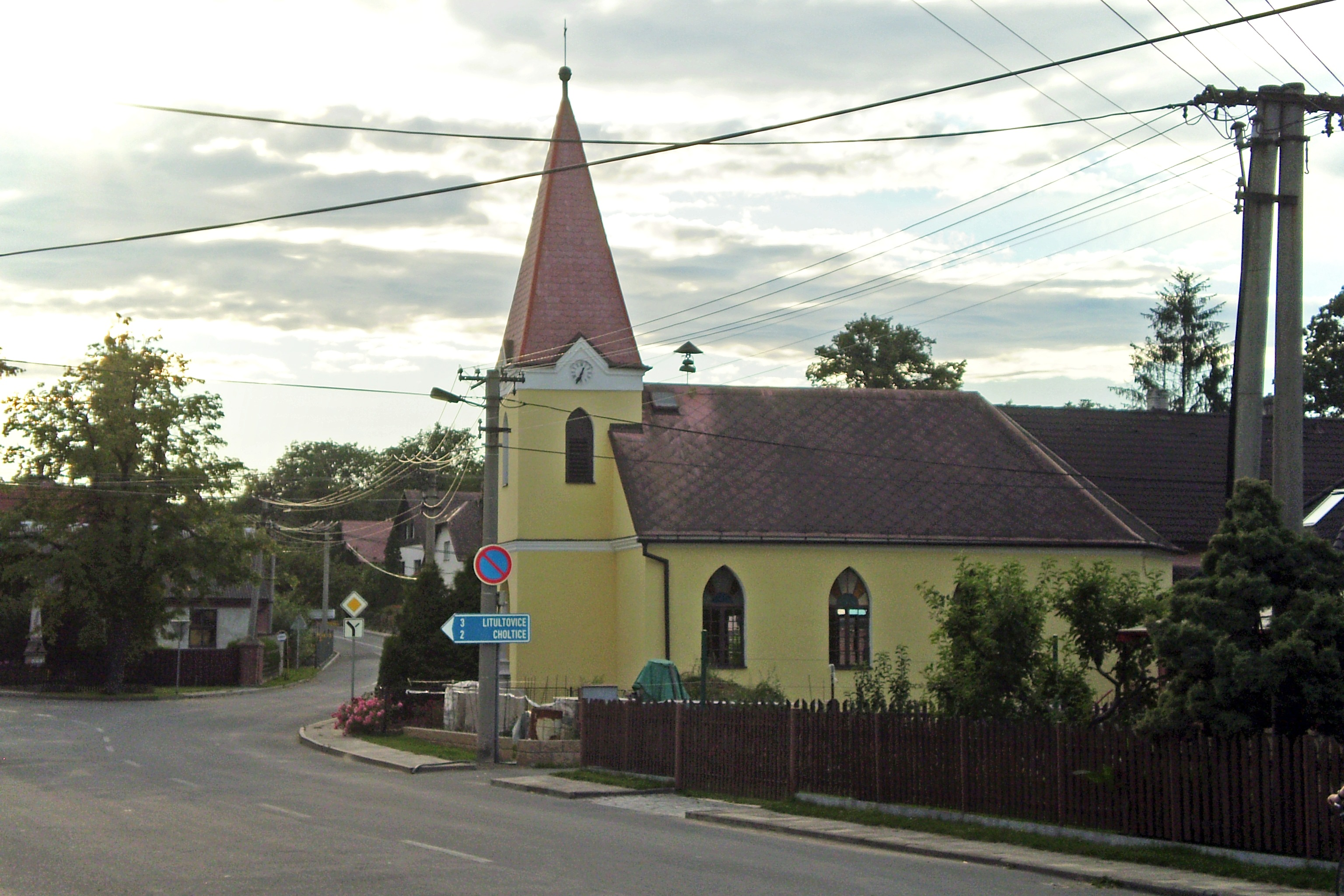
- Chapel of Christ the King

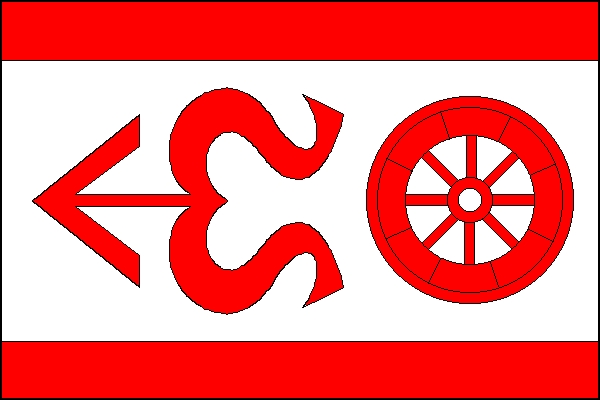
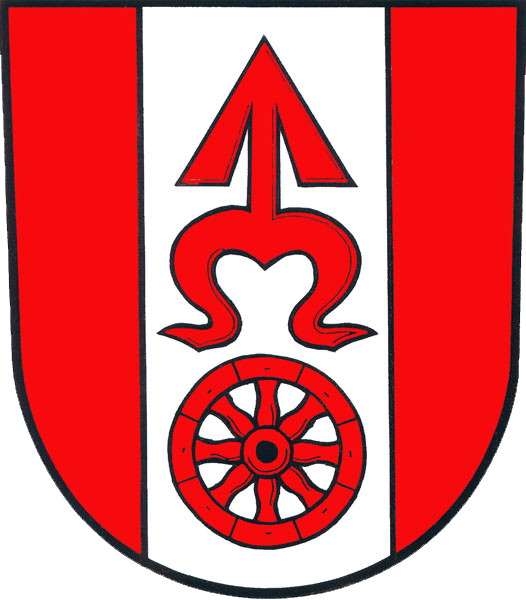
- Flag Coat of arms

- Location in the Czech Republic
- Coordinates: 49°55′23″N 17°46′29″E
- Country: Czech Republic
- Region: Moravian-Silesian
- District: Opava
- First mentioned: 1250

Area
  - Total: 3.60 km^{2} (1.39 sq mi)
- Elevation: 331 m (1,086 ft)

Population (2026-01-01)
  - Total: 236
  - Density: 65.6/km^{2} (170/sq mi)
- Time zone: UTC+1 (CET)
  - Summer (DST): UTC+2 (CEST)
- Postal code: 747 55
- Website: www.jezdkovice.cz

Jezdkovice (German: Jeschkowitz) is a municipality and village in Opava District in the Moravian-Silesian Region of the Czech Republic. It has about 200 inhabitants.

== History ==
The first written mention of Jezdkovice is from 1250. The village was founded after 1220.

== Demographics ==
Historical population
Year	Pop.	±%
1869	291	—
1880	328	+12.7%
1890	315	−4.0%
1900	315	+0.0%
1910	341	+8.3%
1921	325	−4.7%
1930	346	+6.5%
1950	284	−17.9%
1961	249	−12.3%
1970	230	−7.6%
1980	196	−14.8%
1991	195	−0.5%
2001	213	+9.2%
2011	222	+4.2%
2021	226	+1.8%
Source: Censuses
