= Bohuslavice (Opava District) =

- Municipality
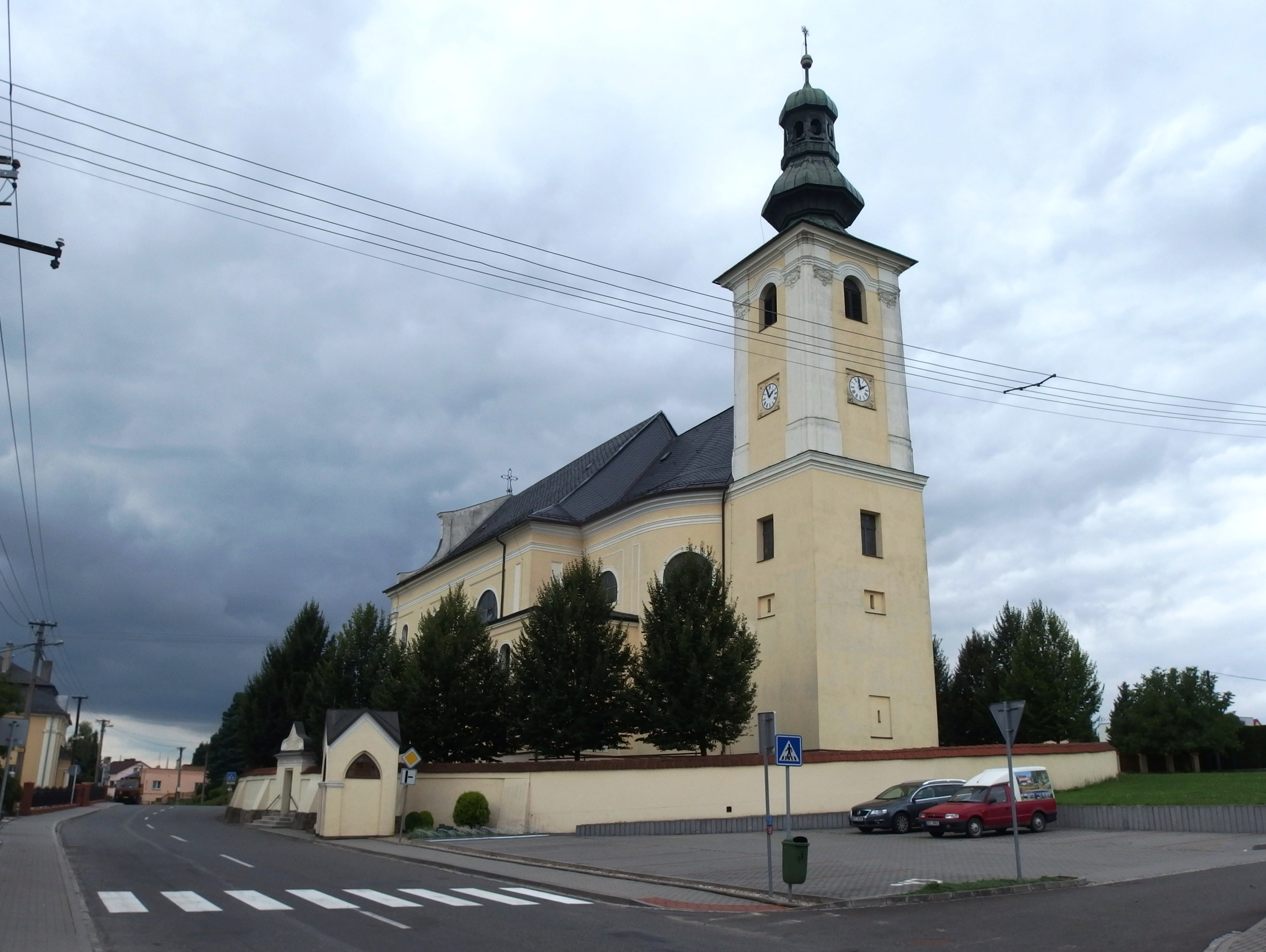
- Church of the Holy Trinity

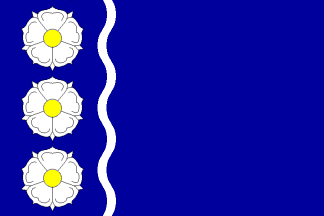
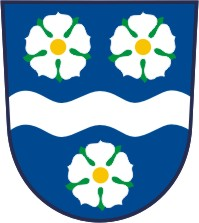
- Flag Coat of arms

- Location in the Czech Republic
- Coordinates: 49°56′32″N 18°7′43″E
- Country: Czech Republic
- Region: Moravian-Silesian
- District: Opava
- First mentioned: 1288

Area
  - Total: 15.33 km^{2} (5.92 sq mi)
- Elevation: 239 m (784 ft)

Population (2026-01-01)
  - Total: 1,798
  - Density: 117.3/km^{2} (303.8/sq mi)
- Time zone: UTC+1 (CET)
  - Summer (DST): UTC+2 (CEST)
- Postal code: 747 19
- Website: www.bohuslavice.eu

Bohuslavice (German: Buslawitz, Polish: Bogusławice) is a municipality and village in Opava District in the Moravian-Silesian Region of the Czech Republic. It has about 1,800 inhabitants. It is part of the historic Hlučín Region.

== History ==
The first written mention of Bohuslavice is from 1288. Until 1920, it belonged to the Prussian province of Silesia.

From 1938 to 1945, Bohuslavice was annexed by Nazi Germany.

== Demographics ==
Historical population
Year	Pop.	±%
1869	1,094	—
1880	1,128	+3.1%
1890	1,130	+0.2%
1900	1,202	+6.4%
1910	1,177	−2.1%
1921	1,171	−0.5%
1930	1,273	+8.7%
1950	1,204	−5.4%
1961	1,429	+18.7%
1970	1,438	+0.6%
1980	1,494	+3.9%
1991	1,499	+0.3%
2001	1,568	+4.6%
2011	1,621	+3.4%
2021	1,706	+5.2%
Source: Censuses
