= Lhotka u Litultovic =

- Municipality
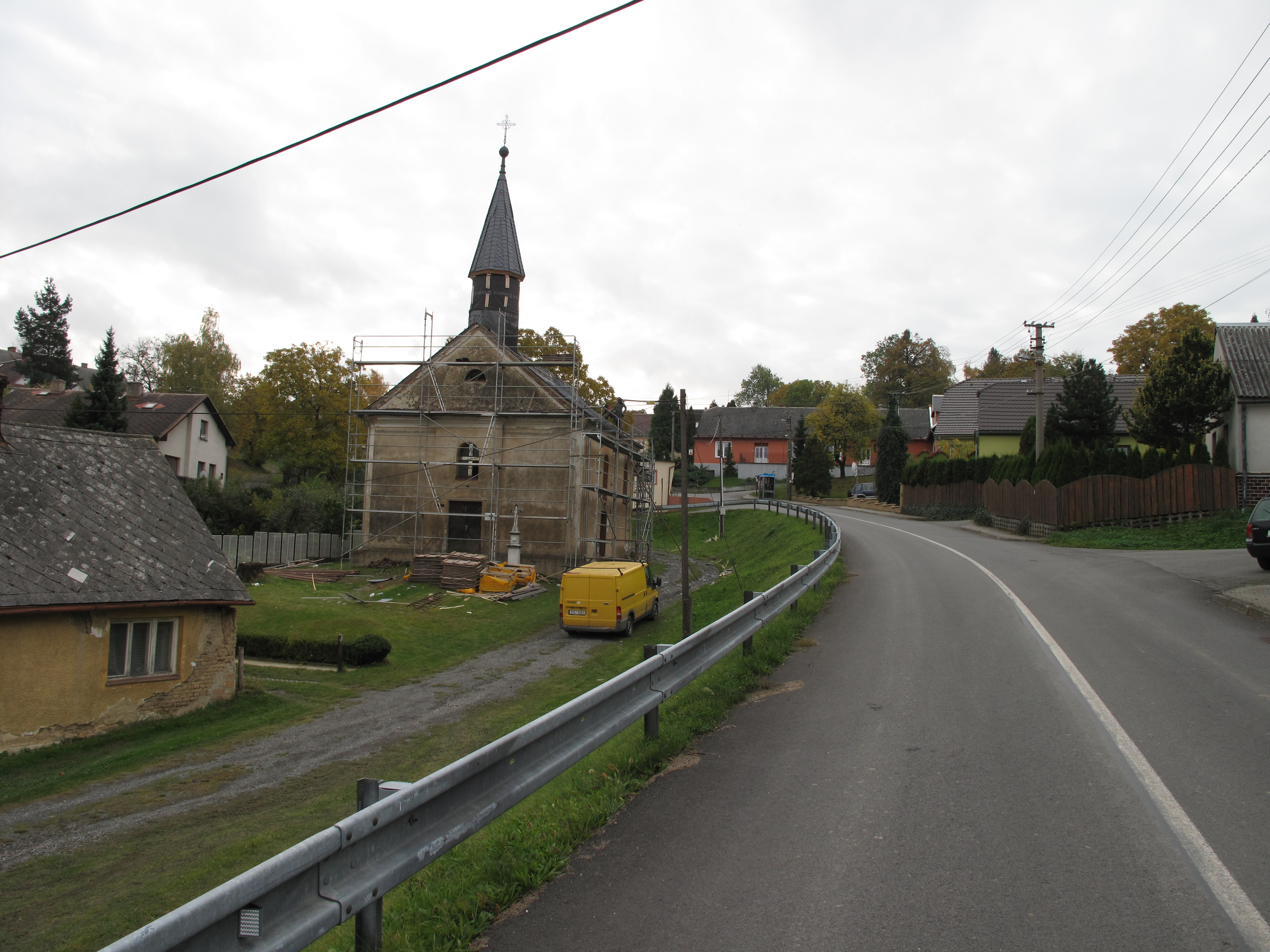
- Chapel of the Holy Trinity

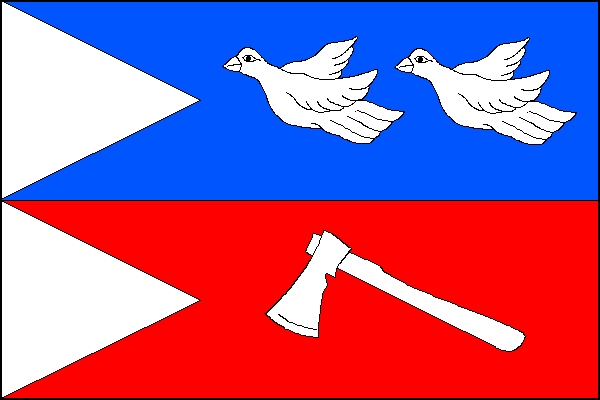
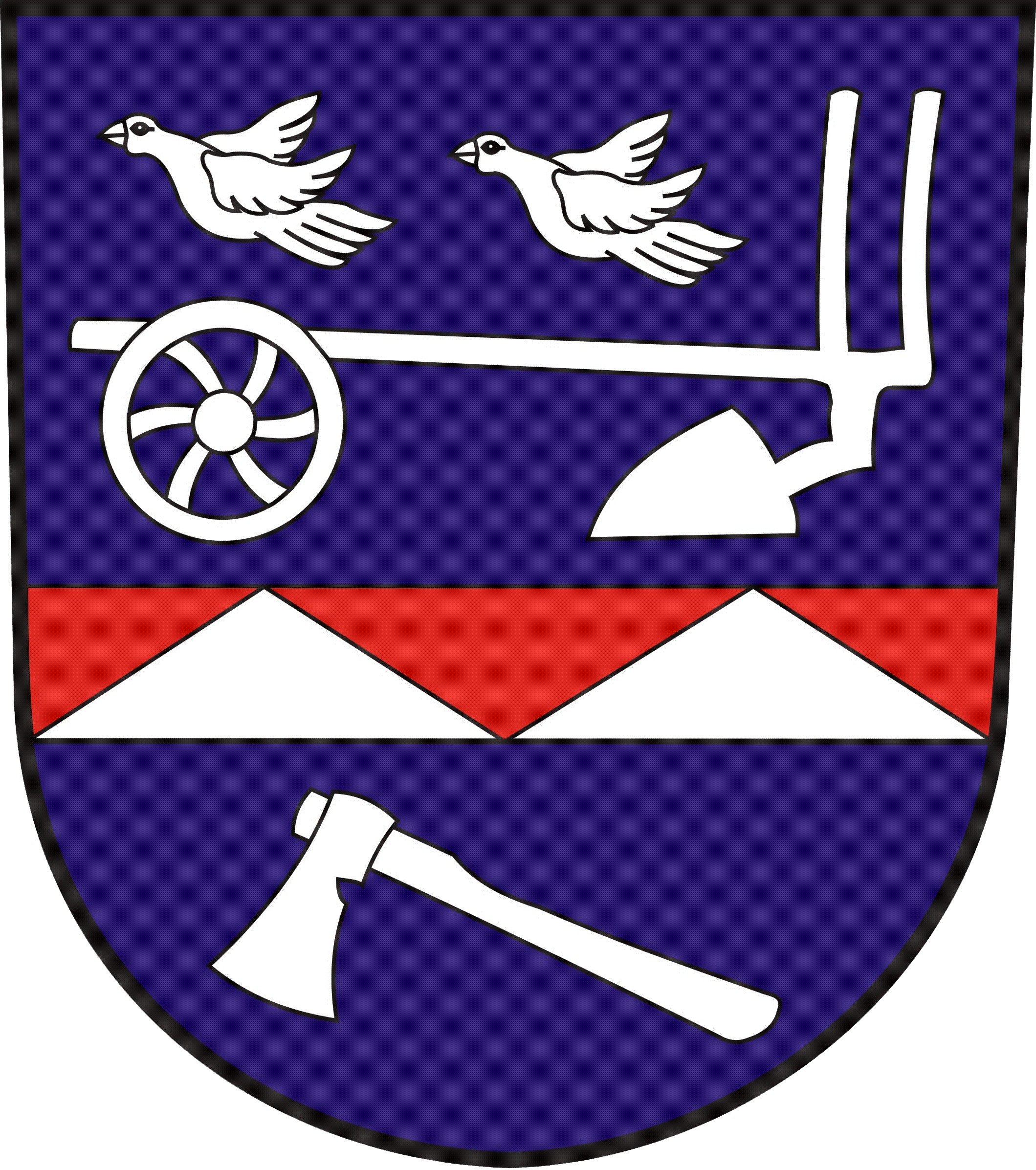
- Flag Coat of arms

- Location in the Czech Republic
- Coordinates: 49°59′29″N 17°57′39″E
- Country: Czech Republic
- Region: Moravian-Silesian
- District: Opava
- First mentioned: 1381

Area
  - Total: 5.07 km^{2} (1.96 sq mi)
- Elevation: 464 m (1,522 ft)

Population (2026-01-01)
  - Total: 224
  - Density: 44.2/km^{2} (114/sq mi)
- Time zone: UTC+1 (CET)
  - Summer (DST): UTC+2 (CEST)
- Postal code: 747 55
- Website: www.lhotkaulitultovic.cz

Lhotka u Litultovic (German: Oehlhütten) is a municipality and village in Opava District in the Moravian-Silesian Region of the Czech Republic. It has about 200 inhabitants.

== Demographics ==
Historical population
Year	Pop.	±%
1869	418	—
1880	410	−1.9%
1890	358	−12.7%
1900	357	−0.3%
1910	349	−2.2%
1921	340	−2.6%
1930	361	+6.2%
1950	240	−33.5%
1961	247	+2.9%
1970	207	−16.2%
1980	192	−7.2%
1991	177	−7.8%
2001	187	+5.6%
2011	201	+7.5%
2021	212	+5.5%
Source: Censuses
