= Vršovice (Opava District) =

- Municipality
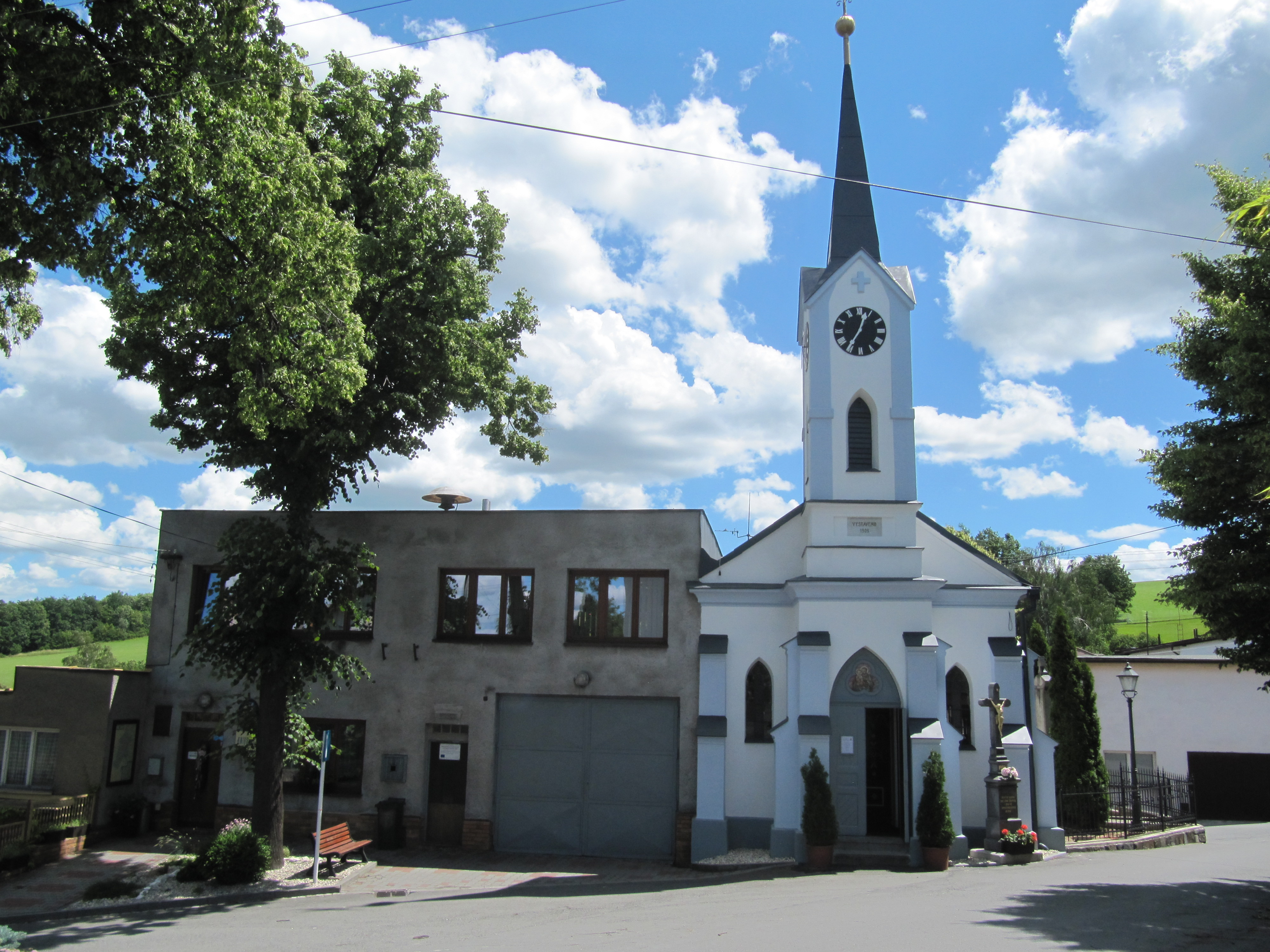
- Municipal office and Chapel of the Divine Heart of the Lord

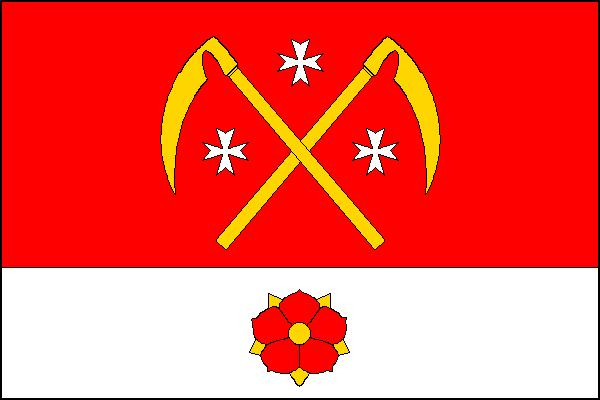
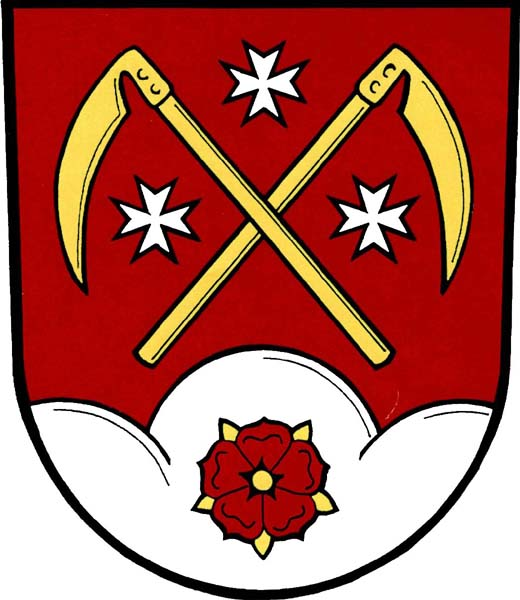
- Flag Coat of arms

- Location in the Czech Republic
- Coordinates: 49°53′5″N 17°56′7″E
- Country: Czech Republic
- Region: Moravian-Silesian
- District: Opava
- First mentioned: 1288

Area
  - Total: 7.94 km^{2} (3.07 sq mi)
- Elevation: 328 m (1,076 ft)

Population (2026-01-01)
  - Total: 526
  - Density: 66.2/km^{2} (172/sq mi)
- Time zone: UTC+1 (CET)
  - Summer (DST): UTC+2 (CEST)
- Postal code: 747 61
- Website: www.vrsoviceuopavy.cz

Vršovice (German: Wrschowitz) is a municipality and village in Opava District in the Moravian-Silesian Region of the Czech Republic. It has about 500 inhabitants.

== History ==
The first written mention of Vršovice is from 1288.

== Demographics ==
Historical population
| Year | Pop. | ±% |
|---|---|---|
| 1869 | 502 | — |
| 1880 | 526 | +4.8% |
| 1890 | 545 | +3.6% |
| 1900 | 583 | +7.0% |
| 1910 | 642 | +10.1% |
| 1921 | 638 | −0.6% |
| 1930 | 595 | −6.7% |
| 1950 | 529 | −11.1% |
| 1961 | 504 | −4.7% |
| 1970 | 477 | −5.4% |
| 1980 | 433 | −9.2% |
| 1991 | 398 | −8.1% |
| 2001 | 437 | +9.8% |
| 2011 | 495 | +13.3% |
| 2021 | 499 | +0.8% |
Source: Censuses
