= Chvalíkovice =

- Municipality
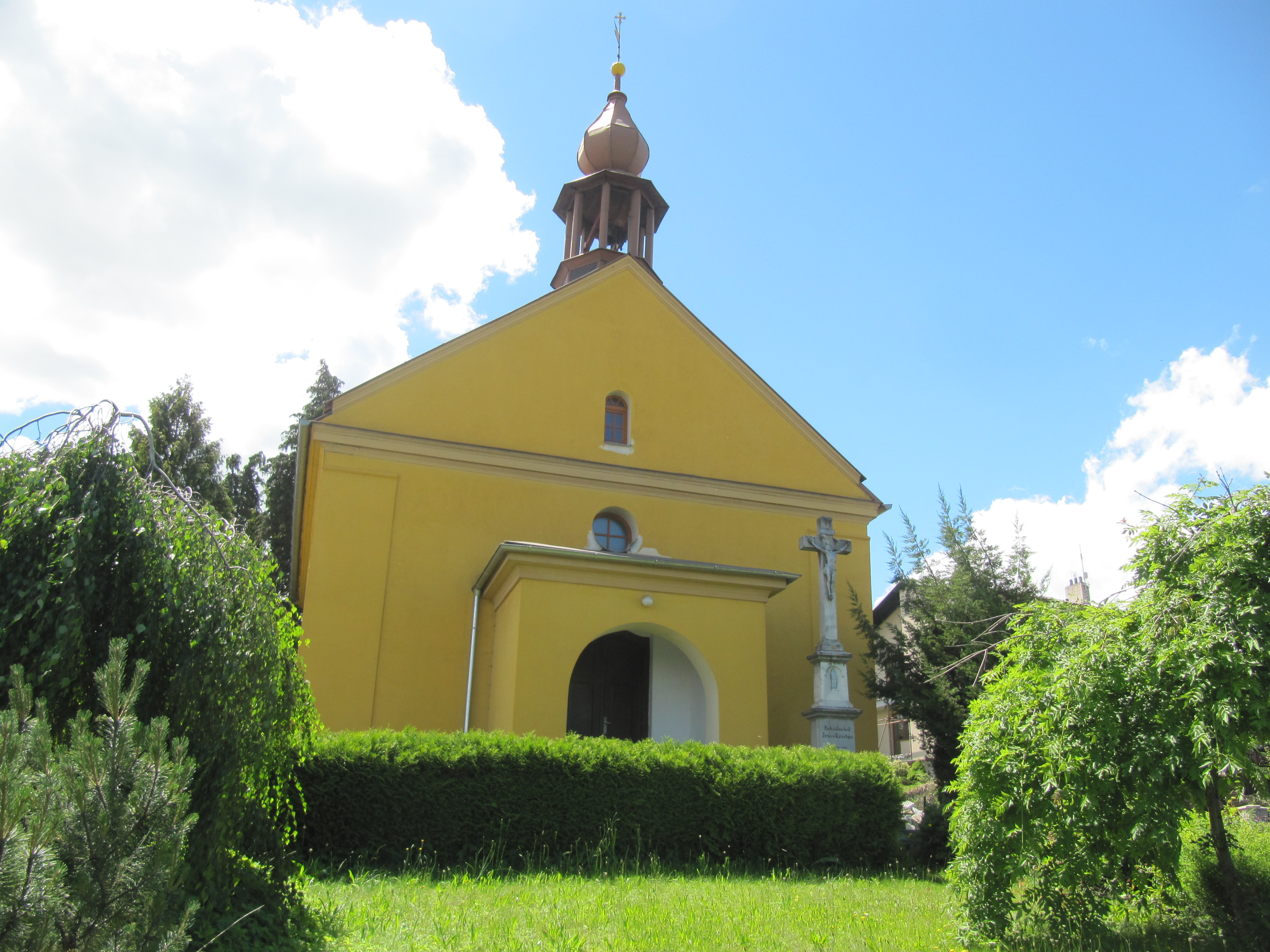
- Chapel of Saint Michael the Archangel

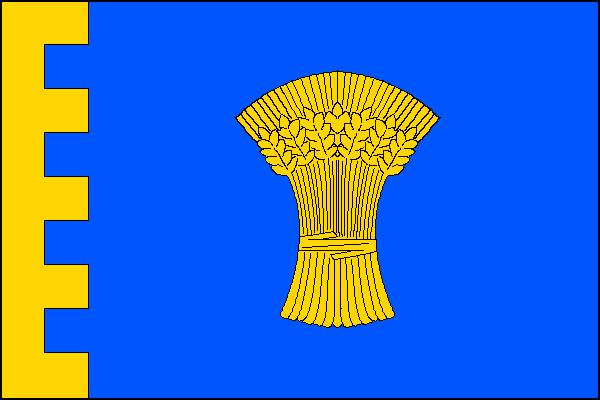
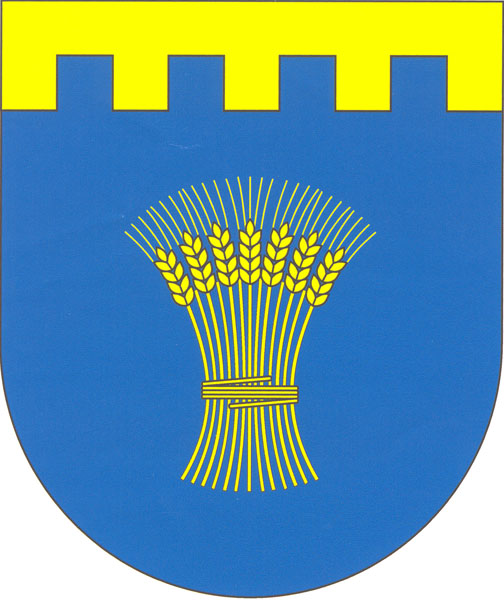
- Flag Coat of arms

- Location in the Czech Republic
- Coordinates: 49°53′8″N 17°54′40″E
- Country: Czech Republic
- Region: Moravian-Silesian
- District: Opava
- First mentioned: 1445

Area
  - Total: 4.46 km^{2} (1.72 sq mi)
- Elevation: 311 m (1,020 ft)

Population (2026-01-01)
  - Total: 685
  - Density: 154/km^{2} (398/sq mi)
- Time zone: UTC+1 (CET)
  - Summer (DST): UTC+2 (CEST)
- Postal code: 747 06
- Website: www.chvalikovice.cz

Chvalíkovice (German: Chwalkowitz) is a municipality and village in Opava District in the Moravian-Silesian Region of the Czech Republic. It has about 700 inhabitants.

== History ==
The first written mention of Chvalíkovice is from 1445.

== Demographics ==
Historical population
Year	Pop.	±%
1869	394	—
1880	418	+6.1%
1890	454	+8.6%
1900	460	+1.3%
1910	452	−1.7%
1921	436	−3.5%
1930	510	+17.0%
1950	447	−12.4%
1961	546	+22.1%
1970	579	+6.0%
1980	606	+4.7%
1991	649	+7.1%
2001	679	+4.6%
2011	694	+2.2%
2021	678	−2.3%
Source: Censuses

== Sights ==
There are no protected cultural monuments in the municipality. The main cultural landmark is the Chapel of Saint Michael the Archangel from 1865.
