= Svatoňovice =

- Municipality
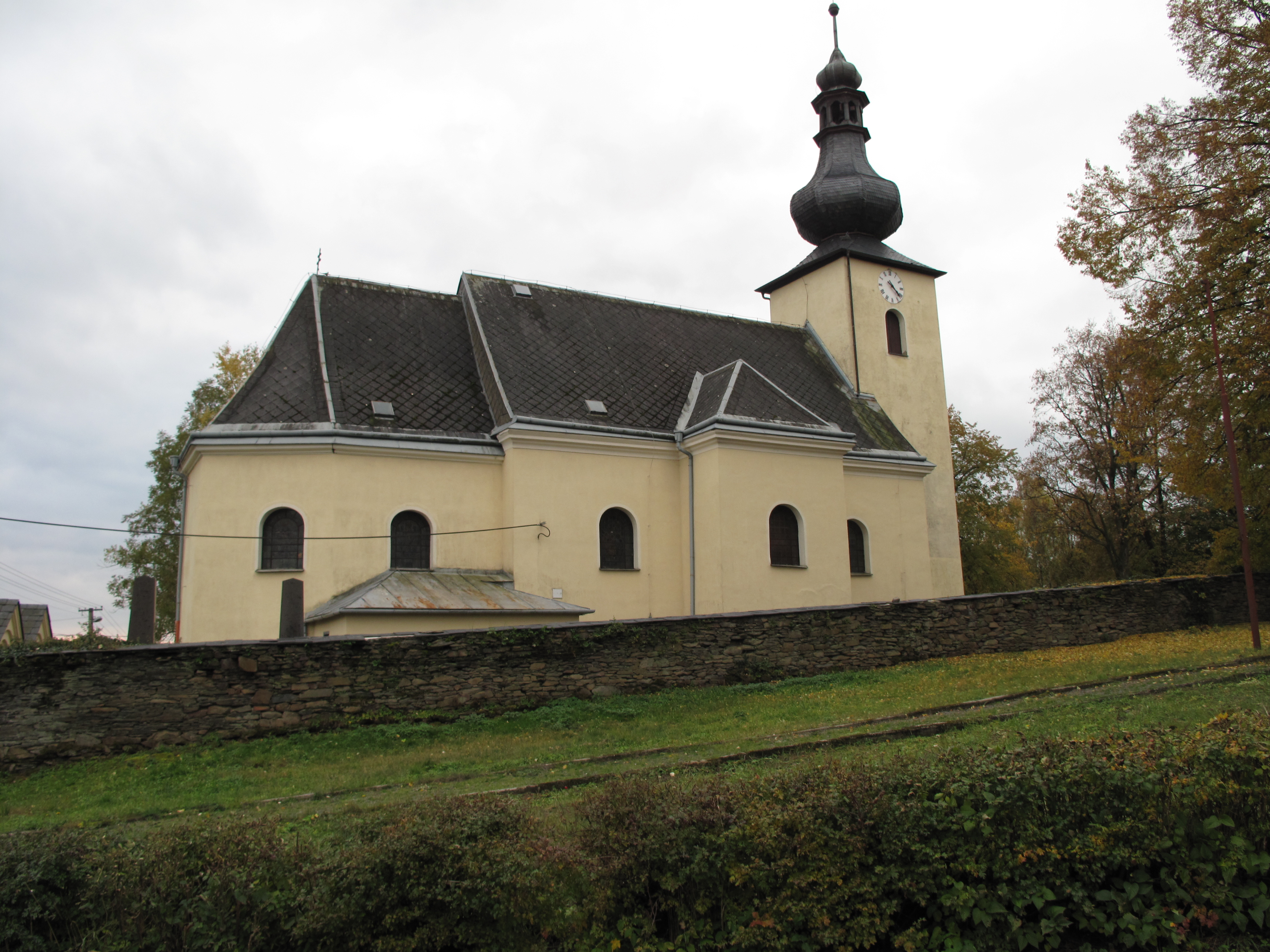
- Church of the Holy Trinity

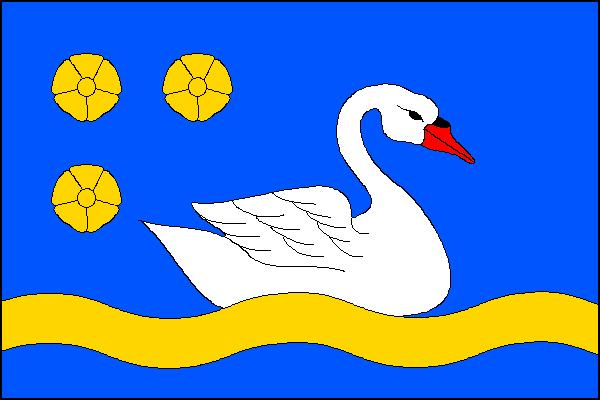
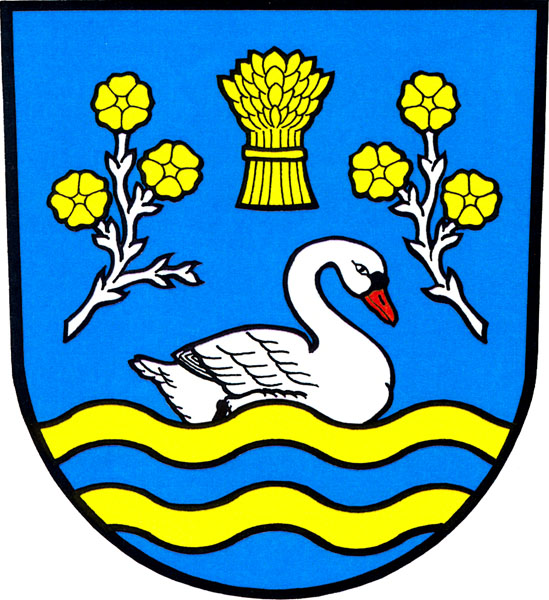
- Flag Coat of arms

- Location in the Czech Republic
- Coordinates: 49°47′37″N 17°40′2″E
- Country: Czech Republic
- Region: Moravian-Silesian
- District: Opava
- First mentioned: 1349

Area
  - Total: 16.45 km^{2} (6.35 sq mi)
- Elevation: 523 m (1,716 ft)

Population (2026-01-01)
  - Total: 251
  - Density: 15.3/km^{2} (39.5/sq mi)
- Time zone: UTC+1 (CET)
  - Summer (DST): UTC+2 (CEST)
- Postal code: 747 87
- Website: svatonovice.cz

Svatoňovice (German: Schwansdorf) is a municipality and village in Opava District in the Moravian-Silesian Region of the Czech Republic. It has about 300 inhabitants.

== History ==
The first written mention of Svatoňovice is from 1377.

== Demographics ==
Historical population
Year	Pop.	±%
1869	606	—
1880	626	+3.3%
1890	580	−7.3%
1900	592	+2.1%
1910	544	−8.1%
1921	561	+3.1%
1930	553	−1.4%
1950	408	−26.2%
1961	273	−33.1%
1970	348	+27.5%
1980	323	−7.2%
1991	292	−9.6%
2001	308	+5.5%
2011	286	−7.1%
2021	251	−12.2%
Source: Censuses
