= Hlavnice =

- Municipality
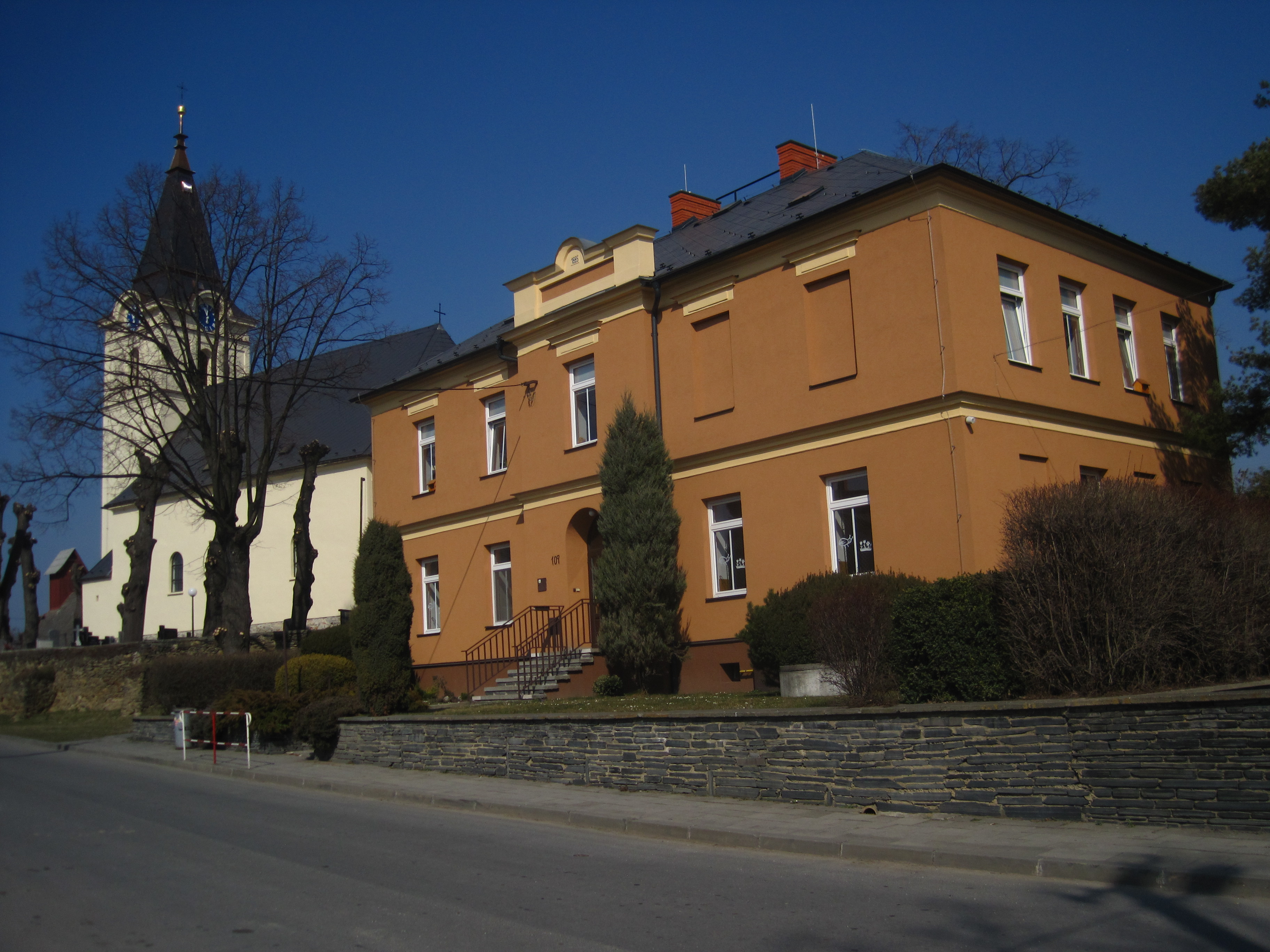
- Church of the Holy Trinity and school

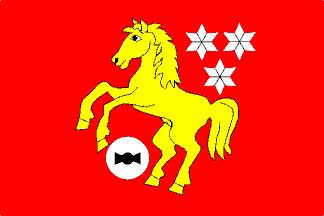
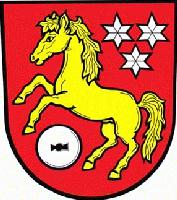
- Flag Coat of arms

- Location in the Czech Republic
- Coordinates: 49°55′28″N 17°43′40″E
- Country: Czech Republic
- Region: Moravian-Silesian
- District: Opava
- First mentioned: 1250

Area
  - Total: 11.09 km^{2} (4.28 sq mi)
- Elevation: 388 m (1,273 ft)

Population (2026-01-01)
  - Total: 684
  - Density: 61.7/km^{2} (160/sq mi)
- Time zone: UTC+1 (CET)
  - Summer (DST): UTC+2 (CEST)
- Postal code: 747 52
- Website: www.obechlavnice.cz

Hlavnice (German: Glomnitz) is a municipality and village in Opava District in the Moravian-Silesian Region of the Czech Republic. It has about 700 inhabitants.

== History ==
The first written mention of Hlavnice is from 1250.

== Demographics ==
Historical population
Year	Pop.	±%
1869	684	—
1880	730	+6.7%
1890	726	−0.5%
1900	730	+0.6%
1910	741	+1.5%
1921	677	−8.6%
1930	635	−6.2%
1950	510	−19.7%
1961	498	−2.4%
1970	484	−2.8%
1980	489	+1.0%
1991	568	+16.2%
2001	595	+4.8%
2011	621	+4.4%
2021	634	+2.1%
Source: Censuses
