= Čermná ve Slezsku =

- Municipality
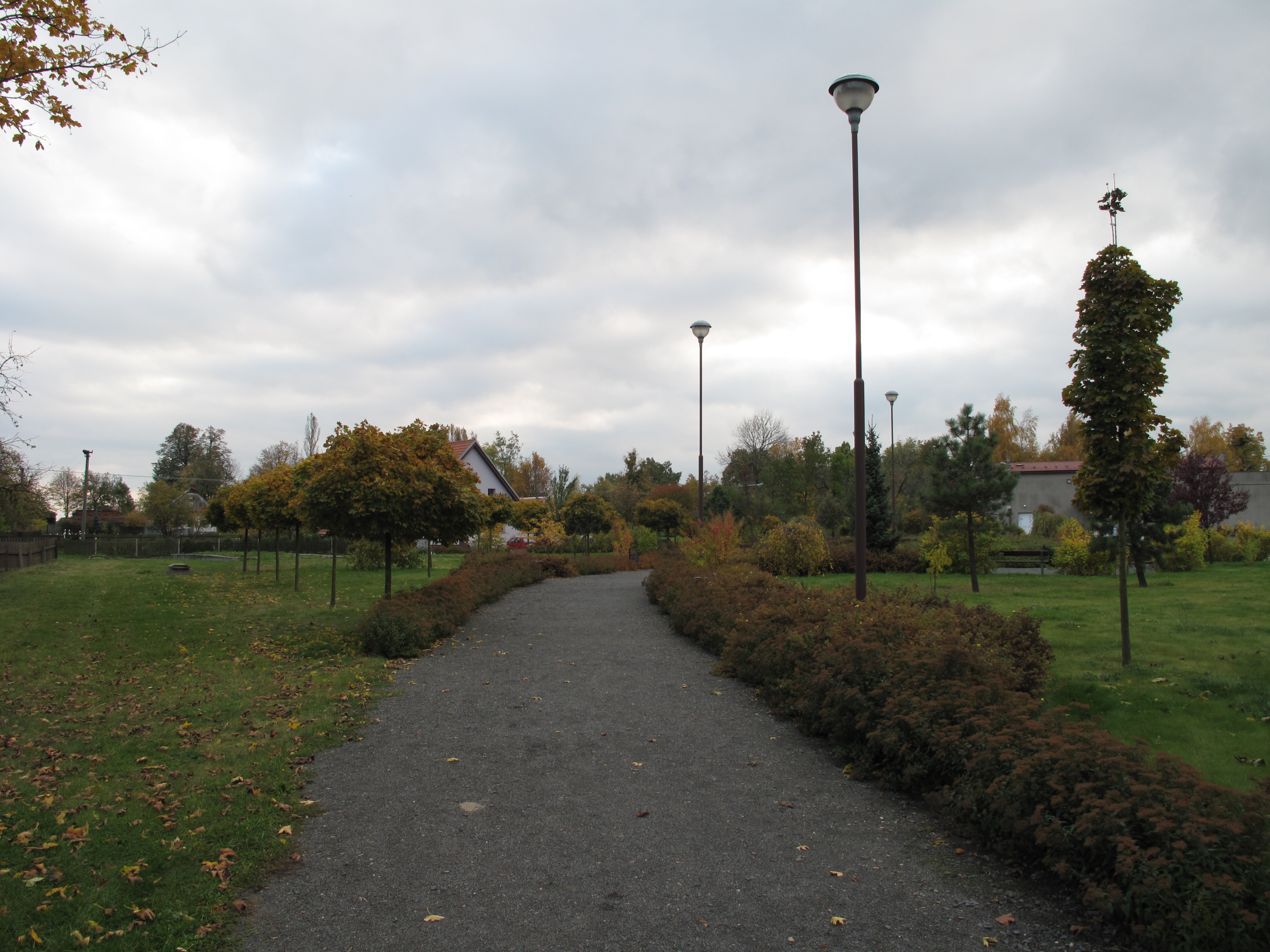
- Centre of Čermná ve Slezsku

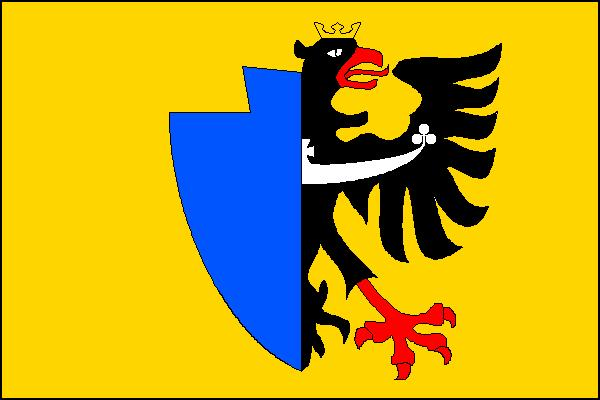
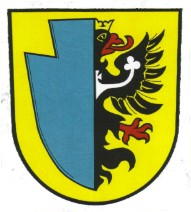
- Flag Coat of arms

- Location in the Czech Republic
- Coordinates: 49°46′56″N 17°42′8″E
- Country: Czech Republic
- Region: Moravian-Silesian
- District: Opava
- First mentioned: 1377

Area
  - Total: 12.31 km^{2} (4.75 sq mi)
- Elevation: 542 m (1,778 ft)

Population (2026-01-01)
  - Total: 369
  - Density: 30.0/km^{2} (77.6/sq mi)
- Time zone: UTC+1 (CET)
  - Summer (DST): UTC+2 (CEST)
- Postal code: 749 01
- Website: www.cermnaveslezsku.cz

Čermná ve Slezsku is a municipality and village in Opava District in the Moravian-Silesian Region of the Czech Republic. It has about 400 inhabitants.

== History ==
The first written mention of Čermná ve Slezsku is from 1377. The village was founded in the 14th century.

== Demographics ==
Historical population
| Year | Pop. | ±% |
|---|---|---|
| 1869 | 504 | — |
| 1880 | 507 | +0.6% |
| 1890 | 564 | +11.2% |
| 1900 | 578 | +2.5% |
| 1910 | 536 | −7.3% |
| 1921 | 527 | −1.7% |
| 1930 | 499 | −5.3% |
| 1950 | 276 | −44.7% |
| 1961 | 343 | +24.3% |
| 1970 | 318 | −7.3% |
| 1980 | 332 | +4.4% |
| 1991 | 281 | −15.4% |
| 2001 | 311 | +10.7% |
| 2011 | 359 | +15.4% |
| 2021 | 354 | −1.4% |
Source: Censuses
