= Hlubočec =

- Municipality
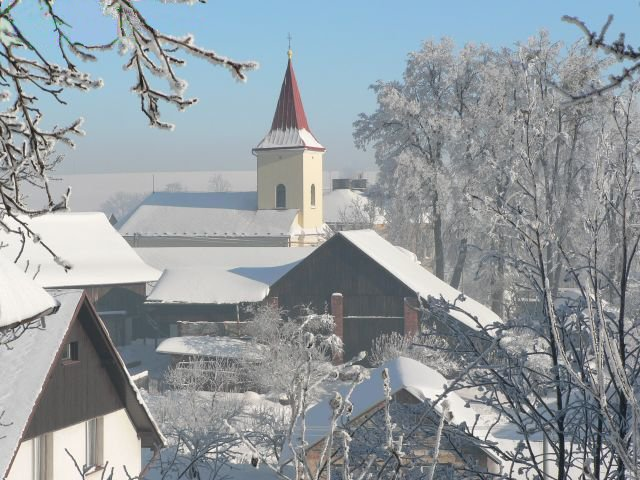
- Chapel of Saints John and Paul

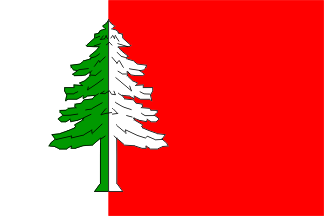
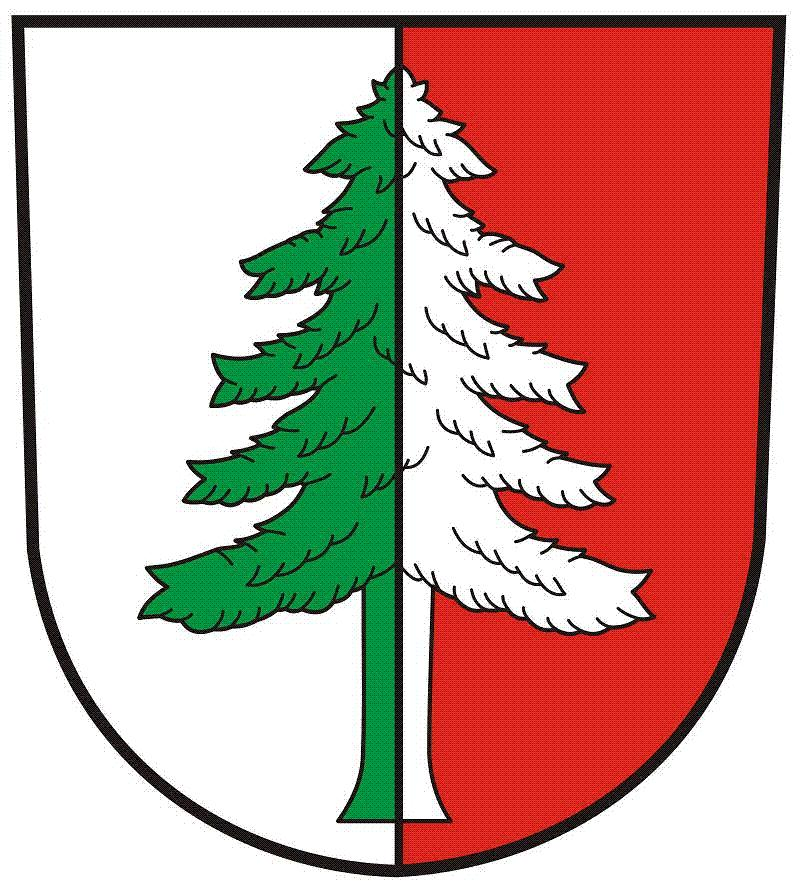
- Flag Coat of arms

- Location in the Czech Republic
- Coordinates: 49°50′26″N 17°58′13″E
- Country: Czech Republic
- Region: Moravian-Silesian
- District: Opava
- First mentioned: 1487

Area
  - Total: 9.38 km^{2} (3.62 sq mi)
- Elevation: 441 m (1,447 ft)

Population (2026-01-01)
  - Total: 565
  - Density: 60.2/km^{2} (156/sq mi)
- Time zone: UTC+1 (CET)
  - Summer (DST): UTC+2 (CEST)
- Postal code: 747 69
- Website: www.hlubocec.cz

Hlubočec (German: Tiefengrund) is a municipality and village in Opava District in the Moravian-Silesian Region of the Czech Republic. It has about 600 inhabitants.

== History ==
The first written mention of Hlubočec is from 1487.

== Demographics ==
Historical population
Year	Pop.	±%
1869	617	—
1880	661	+7.1%
1890	663	+0.3%
1900	700	+5.6%
1910	727	+3.9%
1921	672	−7.6%
1930	715	+6.4%
1950	614	−14.1%
1961	615	+0.2%
1970	553	−10.1%
1980	576	+4.2%
1991	554	−3.8%
2001	543	−2.0%
2011	564	+3.9%
2021	572	+1.4%
Source: Censuses
