= List of castles in the Moravian-Silesian Region =

This is a list of castles and chateaux located in the Moravian-Silesian Region of the Czech Republic.

== A ==
- Alfrédova chata Chateau

== B ==
- Bartošovice Chateau
- Bartovice Chateau
- Bělá Castle
- Bílá Chateau
- Bílovec Chateau
- Blücherův palác Chateau
- Bohumín Chateau
- Bolatice Chateau
- Brandýs Chateau
- Brantice Chateau
- Bravantice Chateau
- Bruntál Chateau
- Burkvíz Castle

== C ==
- Chotěbuz Chateau
- Chuchelná Chateau
- Cvilín Castle
- Čeladná Castle

== D ==
- Dětřichovice u Příbora Castle
- Dívčí Hrad Chateau
- Dobratice Chateau
- Dolní Benešov Chateau
- Dolní Bludovice Chateau
- Dolní Domaslavice Chateau
- Dolní Líštná Chateau
- Dolní Marklovice Chateau
- Dolní Soběšovice Chateau
- Dolní Suchá Chateau
- Dolní Tošanovice Chateau
- Dolní Životice Chateau
- Dorňákův kopec Castle
- Drakov Castle
- Dubová Chateau

== F ==
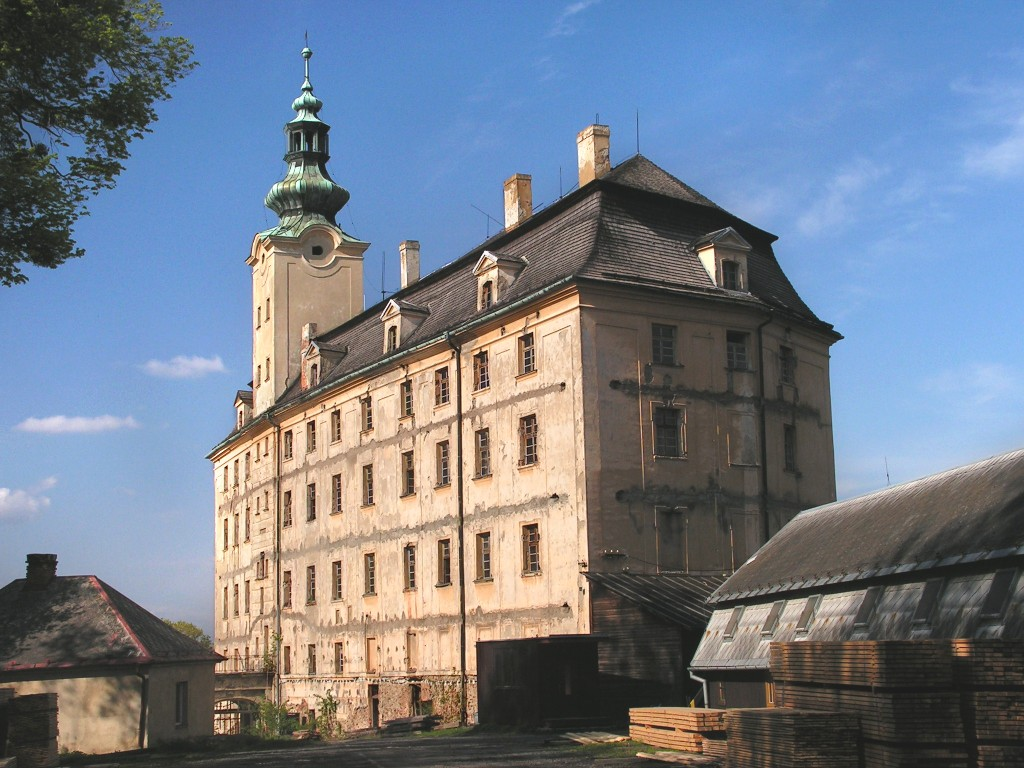
Fulnek Castle

- Freudenštejn Castle
- Frýdek Chateau
- Fryštát Chateau
- Fulnek Chateau
- Fulštejn Castle
- Fürstenwalde Castle

== G ==
- Gabrielina chata Chateau

== H ==
- Hartisov Chateau
- Hlavnice Chateau
- Hlučín Chateau
- Hnojník Chateau
- Horní Bludovice Chateau
- Horní Domaslavice Chateau
- Horní Soběšovice Chateau
- Horní Suchá Chateau
- Horní Tošanovice Chateau
- Hošťálkovice Chateau
- Hošťálkovy Chateau
- Hrabyně Chateau
- Hradec nad Moravicí Chateaucí
- Hradní vrch Castle
- Hrádek nad Olší Castle
- Hukovice Chateau
- Hukvaldy Castle
- Hukvaldy Chateau

== J ==
- Jakartovice-Deštné Chateau
- Janovice Castle
- Janovice Chateau
- Jeseník nad Odrou Chateau
- Jezdkovice Chateau
- Jindřichov Chateau
- Jurův kámen Castle

== K ==
- Karpentná Castle
- Kateřinice Chateau
- Klimkovice Chateau
- Klokočov Chateau
- Konská Chateau
- Kostelec Chateau
- Kravaře Chateau
- Krnov Chateau
- Kružberk Castle
- Kunčice nad Ostravicí Chateau
- Kunín Chateau
- Kyjovice Chateau

== L ==
- Landek Castle
- Linhartovy Chateau
- Litultovice Chateau
- Lískovec u Frýdku Castle
- Loděnice Chateau
- Lovecký zámeček Chateau
- Lubno Castle

== M ==
- Medlice Castle
- Melč Chateau
- Město Albrechtice Chateau
- Mladecko Chateau
- Moravská Ostrava Castle
- Moravský Beroun Castle
- Myslík Castle

== N ==
- Návsí Castle
- Neplachovice Chateau
- Nová Horka Chateau
- Nová Ves Castle
- Nový Dvůr Chateau
- Nový Jičín Chateau

== O ==
- Odry Chateau
- Oldřišov Chateau
- Opava Chateau
- Orlová Chateau

== P ==
- Panská vyhlídka Castle
- Paskov Chateau
- Petřvald Chateau
- Polanka nad Odrou Chateau
- Poruba Chateau
- Pražmo Chateau
- Prostřední Bludovice Chateau
- Prostřední Suchá Chateau
- Prstná Chateau
- Přerovec Castle
- Příbor Castle
- Pustějov Chateau
- Pustý zámek Castle

== Q ==
- Quinburg Castle

== R ==
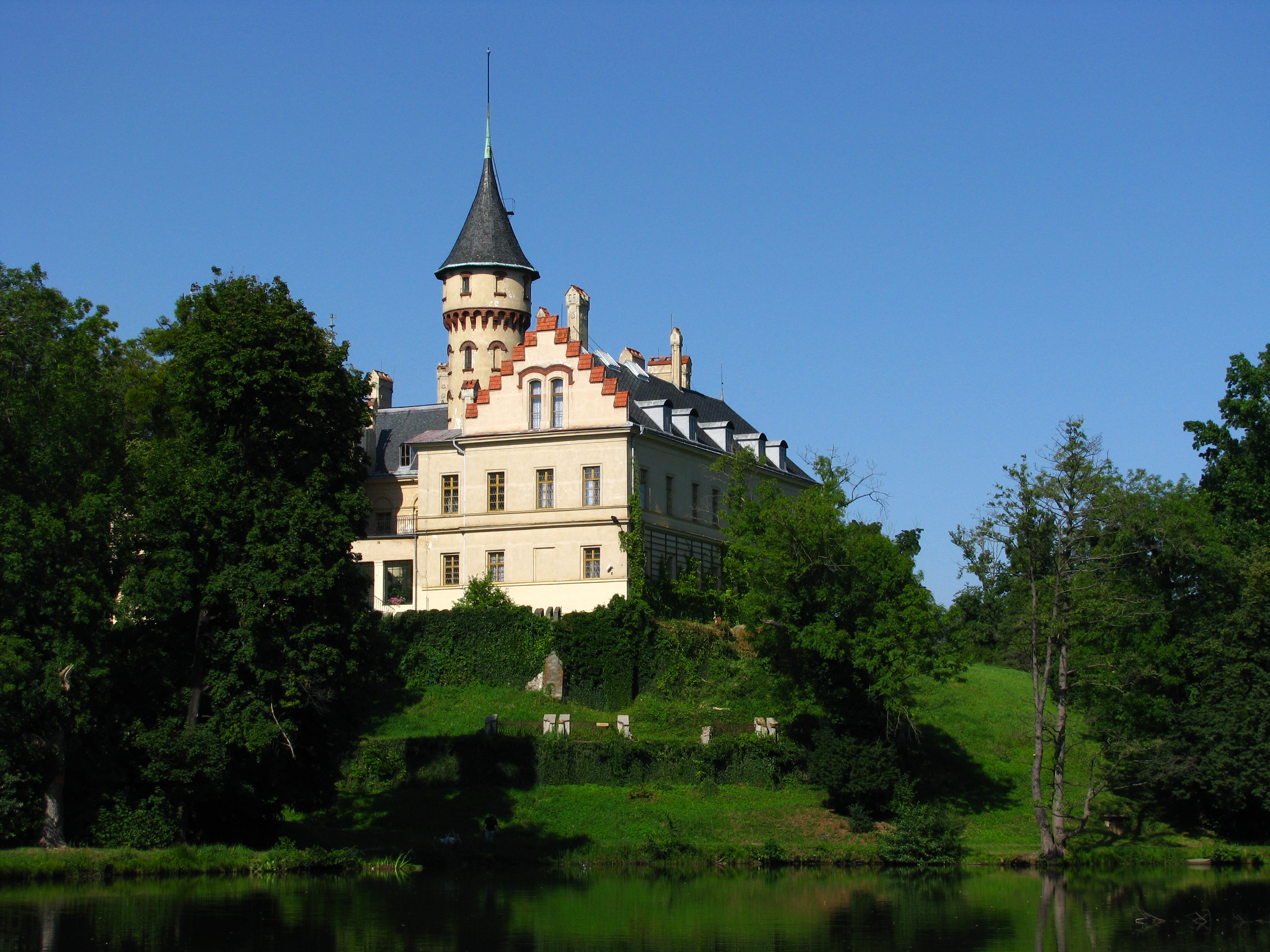
Raduň Chateau

- Rabenštejn Castle
- Raduň Chateau
- Radvanice Chateau
- Raškovice Chateau
- Ráj Chateau
- Rešov Castle
- Ropice Chateau
- Rychvald Chateau
- Řepiště Castle

== S ==
- Sedlnice Chateau
- Silesian Ostrava Castle
- Slatina Chateau
- Slavkov Castle
- Slezské Pavlovice Chateau
- Slezská Ostrava Castle
- Smolkov Chateau
- Sobkův palác Chateau
- Solca Chateau
- Sovinec Castle
- Spálov Chateau
- Stanislavice Chateau
- Stará Ves nad Ondřejnicí Chateau
- Starý Jičín Castle
- Starý Jičín Chateau
- Stěbořice Chateau
- Stonava Chateau
- Strálek Castle
- Střítež Chateau
- Studénka Chateau
- Šenov Chateau
- Šilheřovice Chateau
- Šostýn Castle
- Štandl Castle
- Štáblovice Chateau
- Štemplovec Chateau
- Šternek Castle
- Štítina Chateau
- Štramberk Castle
- Šumbark Chateau
- Švédská skála Castle

== T ==
- Těrlicko Chateau
- Trnávka Chateau
- Třanovice Chateau
- Třebovice Chateau

== V ==
- Vartnov Castle
- Velké Heraltice Chateau
- Velké Hoštice Chateau
- Vendryně Chateau
- Vikštejn Castle
- Vildštejn Castle
- Vítkovice Chateau
- Vratimov Castle
- Výškovice Chateau

== Z ==
- Zábřeh nad Odrou Chateau
- Zátor Castle
- Závada Castle
- Životice Chateau

== See also ==
- List of castles in the Czech Republic
- List of castles in Europe
- List of castles
