= Tošanovice =

Tošanovice may refer either of two villages in Frýdek-Místek District, Moravian-Silesian Region, Czech Republic:

- Dolní Tošanovice
- Horní Tošanovice
