= Mikolajice =

- Municipality
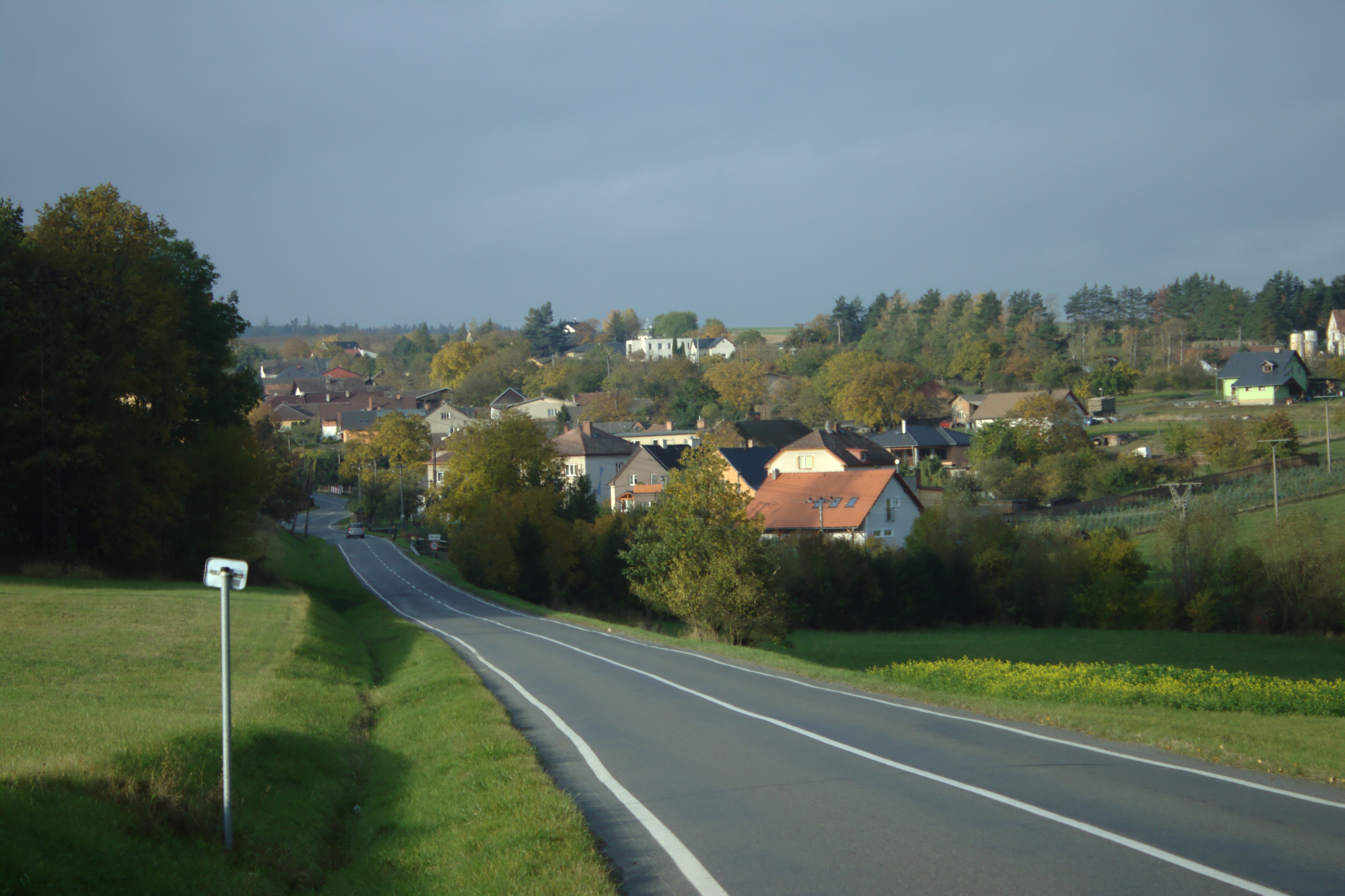
- General view

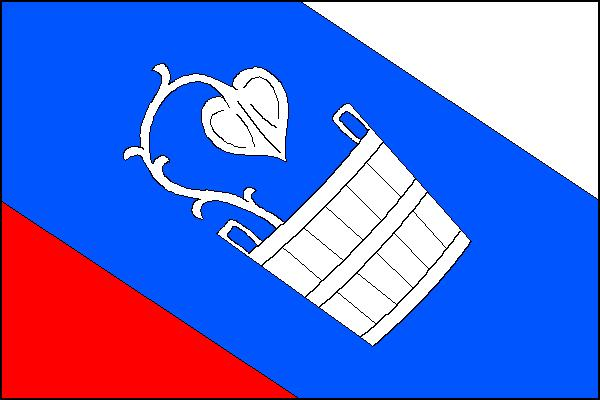
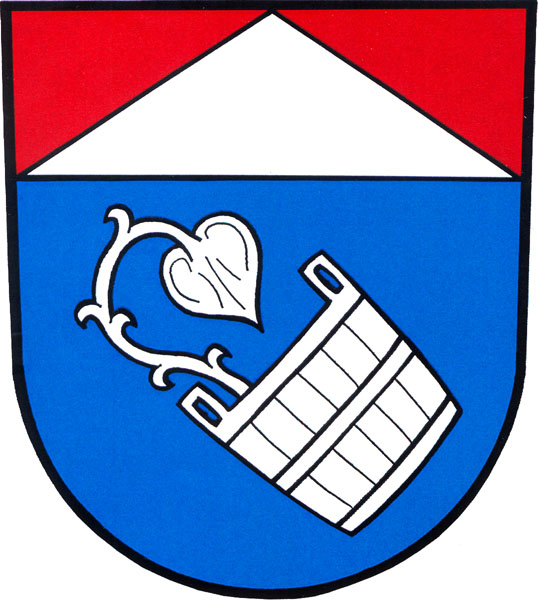
- Flag Coat of arms

- Location in the Czech Republic
- Coordinates: 49°52′38″N 17°47′36″E
- Country: Czech Republic
- Region: Moravian-Silesian
- District: Opava
- First mentioned: 1389

Area
  - Total: 7.40 km^{2} (2.86 sq mi)
- Elevation: 354 m (1,161 ft)

Population (2026-01-01)
  - Total: 292
  - Density: 39.5/km^{2} (102/sq mi)
- Time zone: UTC+1 (CET)
  - Summer (DST): UTC+2 (CEST)
- Postal code: 747 84
- Website: www.mikolajice.cz

Mikolajice is a municipality and village in Opava District in the Moravian-Silesian Region of the Czech Republic. It has about 300 inhabitants.

== History ==
The first written mention of Mikolajice dates from 1389, when parts of the village were held as a fief of the Bishop of Olomouc. From 1408, Mikolajice belonged to the Štáblovice estate. A village school was established in 1866, followed by a volunteer fire brigade in 1879.

Mikolajice became part of Melč in 1979 and regained its status as an independent municipality in 1990.

== Demographics ==
Historical population
Year	Pop.	±%
1869	399	—
1880	426	+6.8%
1890	446	+4.7%
1900	403	−9.6%
1910	381	−5.5%
1921	366	−3.9%
1930	363	−0.8%
1950	278	−23.4%
1961	265	−4.7%
1970	236	−10.9%
1980	246	+4.2%
1991	234	−4.9%
2001	251	+7.3%
2011	257	+2.4%
2021	265	+3.1%
Source: Censuses

== Energy ==
A pilot energy system was installed in Mikolajice in 2018 and opened in February 2019. Its WAVE combined heat and power unit, developed by the Czech Technical University in Prague, burns wood pellets to produce heat and electricity. The municipal office, fire station and grocery store are linked by heating pipes. Solar panels were fitted to the shop’s roof, and batteries store surplus electricity.

In summer, the system uses solar energy and stores any surplus in batteries. The wood-pellet unit runs mainly in winter.

== Sights ==
The Chapel of Saint Florian is the main landmark. Inside the chapel is a wooden altar from the eighteenth century.

A wayside shrine known as the Swedish Column stands beside the old road between Mikolajice and Melč. Built of brick and rubble stone, it is about 3.2 metres tall. Its construction date and original purpose are uncertain.
