= Pernštejn Castle =

Castle in the Czech Republic

- hrad Pernštejn
- Nedvědice, South Moravian Region; Near Brno in the Czech Republic
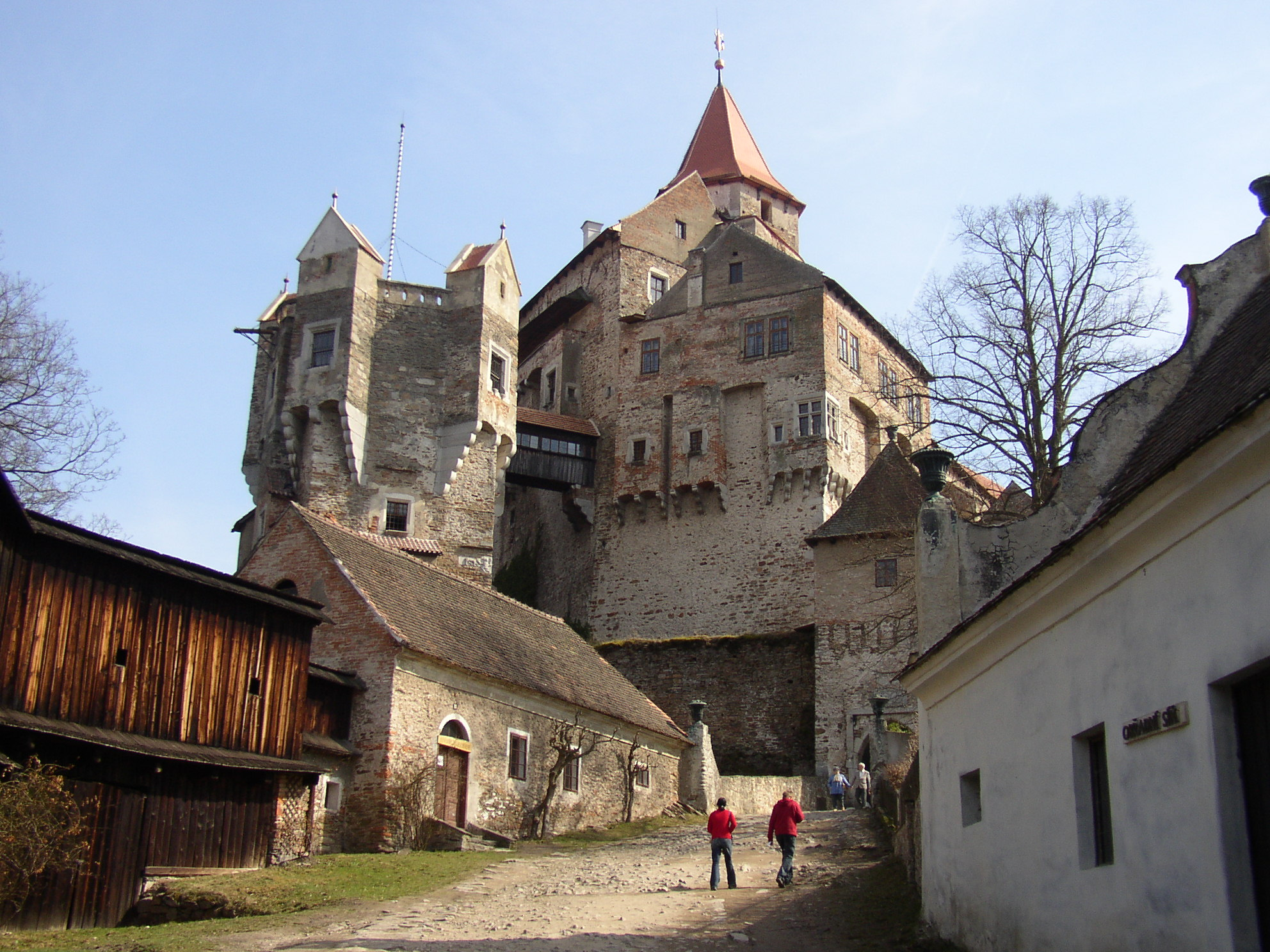
- Pernštejn Castle

Site information
- Type: Castle

Location
- Location in the Czech Republic
- Coordinates: 49°27′3″N 16°19′6″E

Site history
- Built: 1270–1285

Pernštejn Castle (Czech: hrad Pernštejn, from German: Bernstein, originally from Bärenstein) is a castle in the South Moravian Region of the Czech Republic. It lies on a rock above the village of Nedvědice and the rivers Svratka and Nedvědička, about 40 kilometres (25 mi) northwest of Brno. Pernštejn came to be known as the marble castle because of the marble-like stone used to frame the doors and windows.

It was founded by the Lords of Medlov probably between 1270 and 1285. The family branch seated at the castle and adopted the then fashionable name Pernštejn (written also Pernstein), which is the Czech version probably derived of the German name, Bärenstein – the "Bear Rock". Its history is closely connected to the Pernštejn family and their descendants. It has kept its intact appearance in the Gothic and Renaissance form as it was finished in the first half of the 16th century by the Pernštejns, then the richest and most powerful lordly family of the Bohemian kingdom. Pernštejn is one of the best preserved castles in Czech Republic.

== History ==
=== 13th to 15th centuries ===
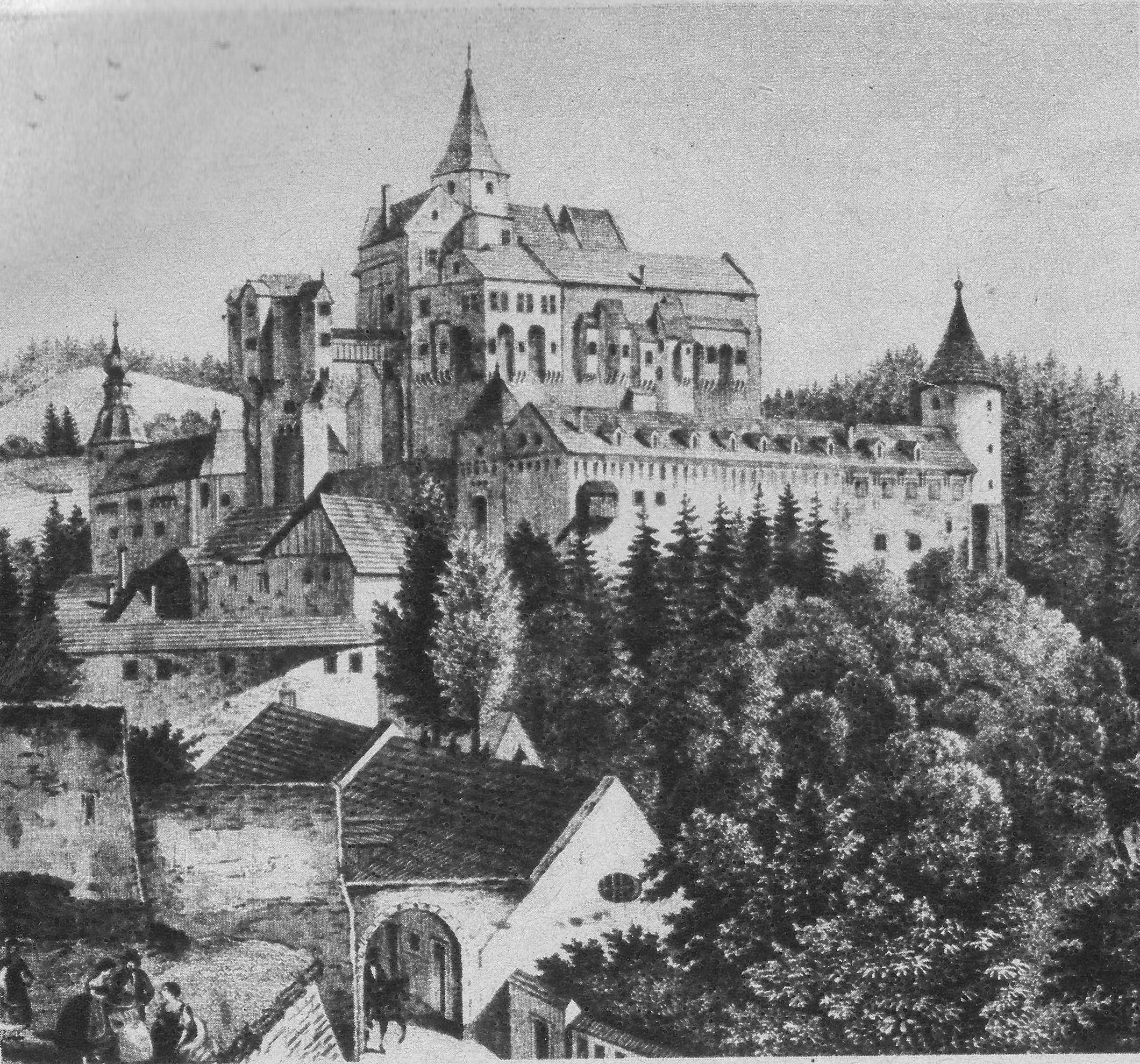
Pernštejn in the 1830s as depicted by Adolph Kunike (1777–1838)

The castle was built as a typical nazal castle in a place which suited perfectly to its purpose: from three sides it was protected by a steep rock slope (the rock penetrates the building up to the second floor), accessible only from the north across a ridge that rises towards the castle and could be easily diked and protected by a system of bails. A prostrate, protruding settlement around the castle is formed by five yards, demarcated by outbuildings, ramparts, gates and a bastion in the north and barbican in the centre. In the most convenient place there is a lake in the rock with an unfailing spring, today covered with castle buildings, accessible from the inner castle courtyard. The core of the castle was built here: the Barborka Tower (a round five-storied tower with an edge turned toward the driveway), the castle palace and the courtyard protected by the rampart. These parts were completely covered by later extensions, only the high tower Barborka still projects over the complex of castle buildings. The builder of the castle is unknown. The first historically recorded ancestor of the Pernštejn family can be considered Stephen of Medlov, a significant Moravian personality from the beginning of the 13th century. It as probably he who transferred the family property from the southern Moravia to the Uplands. It was in the 13th century that the foundations of the new manorial power: a large property of land independent on the service to the sovereign on his favour, with servile villages and strong castles. Several significant Moravian noble families built their dominions exactly in the southeastern area of the Uplands. The sovereign's control did not reach this far, there was enough land for colonisation, forests for hunting, places for building castles and private law ruled there.

During the wild years after the extinction of the Přemyslid dynasty (1306) and during the rule of John of Bohemia (1310–1346) there are not many notes of the Pernštejn Castle and of its masters. Though, it can be supposed that they belonged to those of whom the King Charles IV wrote that "they mostly became tyrants and did not fear the king, as it beseemed, because they had divided the kingdom among themselves". Not even the quieter years during the rule of Charles IV and his brother margrave John Henry could not stop the rise of the manorial power. We only know the names of the Pernštejn lords from the first two-thirds of the 14th century. They took part in the public life in assemblies and authorities, further expanding their property. The castle probably did not change too much in those days; its prime was to come during the last quarter of the 14th century and during the 15th century.

After the death of the margrave John Henry (1375), Moravia was split into several adverse, mutually harrying parties, and the castles became bases of political parties and nests of robber barons. At that time of William I was the head of the Pernštejn family and lord of the castle (he appears in documents from 1378 to 1422). The Pernštejn garrison fought not only for their political interests of its masters, but also forayed on almost all high roads of Moravia. An indispensable amount from such incomes went to William's treasury. But William kept on taking part in parliament and the High Court of Justice and executed the duties of prominent offices in the land. He started the rise of the house to the highest social and political goals.

=== 15th to 17th centuries ===
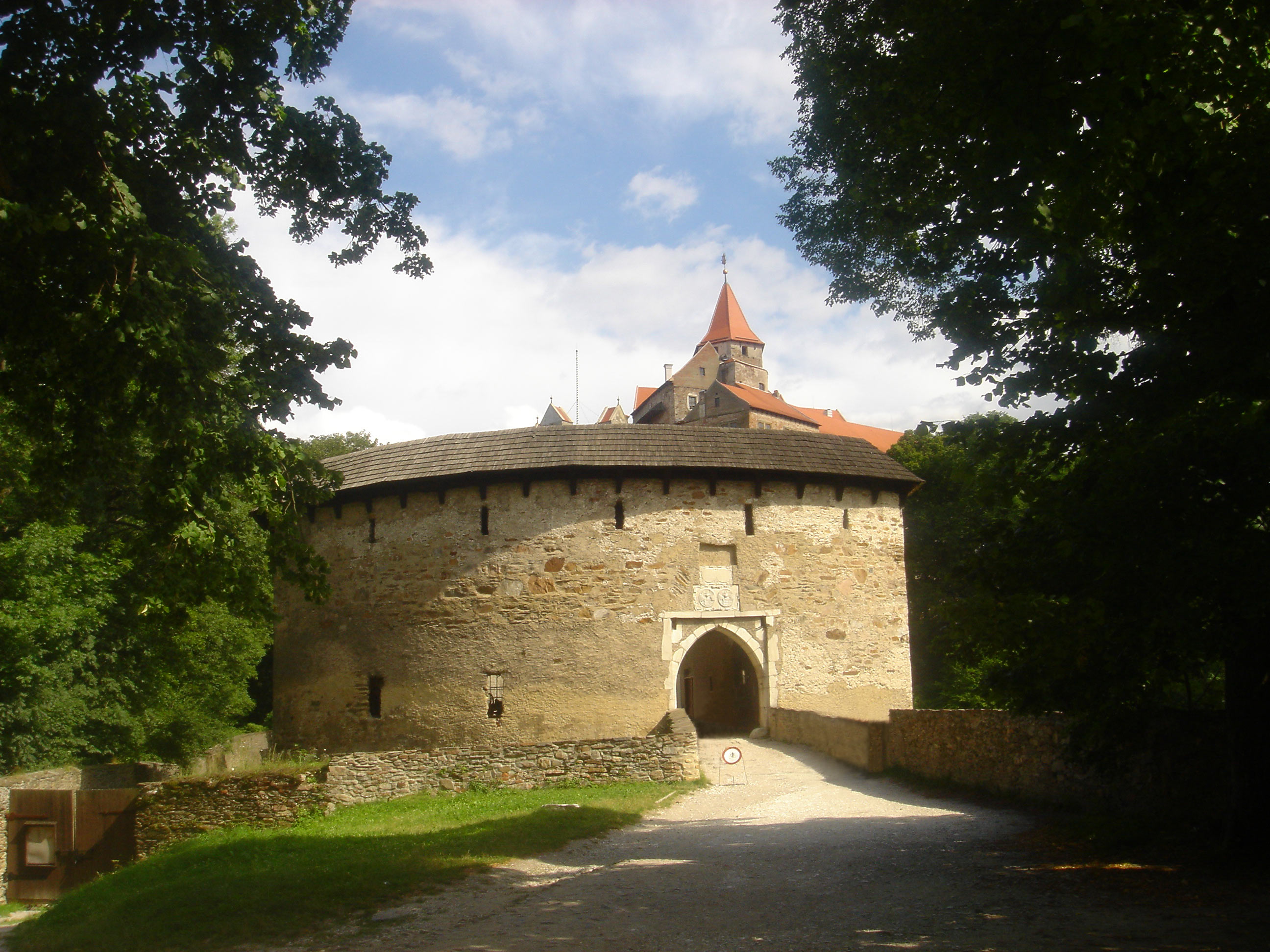
Pernštejn Castle

In the 15th to 17th centuries the military and political significance of the castle grew to its peak. At that time Pernštejn was not only a centre of a large barony, but also a fortress, which played an important role in the struggle for Moravia and the city of Brno. This role of the castle responds for the first leg of its construction – John I carried out the largest reconstruction of the castle, which was also supposed to repair the damage after a big fire from the time before 1460. To the original heart of the castle was then complemented mainly by an ingenious fortification system that protected the whole naze. Ditches were dug around the castle and walls with new towers were built in the angles of the ramparts and inside the castle complex. The typical Pernštejn square tower grew outside the castle premises and was connected with them by means of two wooden bridges, which was to allow the last resort for defence and withdrawal in the case of seizure of the castle's core.

The castle premises spread by new buildings to the prejudice of the inner yard, and the castle that lacked room began to grow upward. The main fortification system grew toward the north, the only possible direction where an attack could come from. The whole naze was built in this direction as a part of the fortress; it was surrounded by walls and diked by several moats with drawbridges. On the northern end there stood a tall semicircle renaissance bastion protecting the entrance to the spacious settlement around the castle with outbuildings. Another barrier on the way toward the castle was a mighty barbican whose 3 m thick walls with crenels for light firearms and a machicolation protected a narrow way to the entrance surrounded by ramparts. Even if the enemy got across another moat in the very area of the castle, they even would have to face the problem of conquering the only narrow entrance high above the ground to which a wooden ramp terminated by a drawbridge originally led. And then they would have to enter the rooms of the castle through a labyrinth of narrow passages and stairways where two men-at-arms could not pass side by side. The barbican belongs to the best-preserved examples of the late Gothic fortification element in the Czech lands.

The appearance of the castle changed once more – at the end of the 15th and during the first half of the 16th century. The reconstruction was started by William II of Pernštejn (1435–1521). He lived in the area of transition of the Czech lands from Middle Ages to Renaissance and managed to use the relative peace with his "economic" sense to a fantastic rise of the family fortune. At the end of the 15th and the beginning of the 16th century William II is an almost more important personality of interior politics than the Jagello kings. He strove for the unity of the Czech kingdom against the separatist tendencies of the Moravians, forewarned to encroachment of foreigners and of decline of manners. William II of Pernštejn is considered one of the most significant personalities of the Czech history and his political activity is often compared to that of emperor Charles IV.

At that time the castle grew by new halls: where it was impossible to move the walls further out cantilevers were inserted and jetties were made on them, therefore the upper floors of the castle have a bigger area than the ground floor. The entrance space was coved with diamond vault and the former tower cells were turned into dwelling rooms. The Renaissance style, which was brought to Pernštejn probably by the Italians, was promoted in the spatial concept of the new halls, and in the stonework on the reveals of windows and portals.

In the second half of the 16th century came the agony of the house of the Pernštejn. In 1596 they had to sell the castle. Much of the family's wealth and property passed to the Lobkowicz family, through Polyxena of Pernštejn's marriage to Zdeněk Vojtěch Popel of Lobkowicz, Chancellor of the Czech Kingdom. At the end of the 16th century and beginning of the 17th century Pernštejn Castle changed several owners. Its impregnability served well during the Thirty Years' War, specially at times of the siege of the city of Brno by the Swedish army in 1645. They besieged the castle in vain and their cannonade damaged only part of the top floor. In wars Pernštejn was a safe refuge for the neighbouring population and their property, and between the mid-17th and mid-18th centuries it was acclaimed a municipal fortress. In 1710 the Pernštejn estate was bought by Francis of Stockhammer, and the castle remained in the property of that family until 1793.

=== 17th to 21st centuries ===
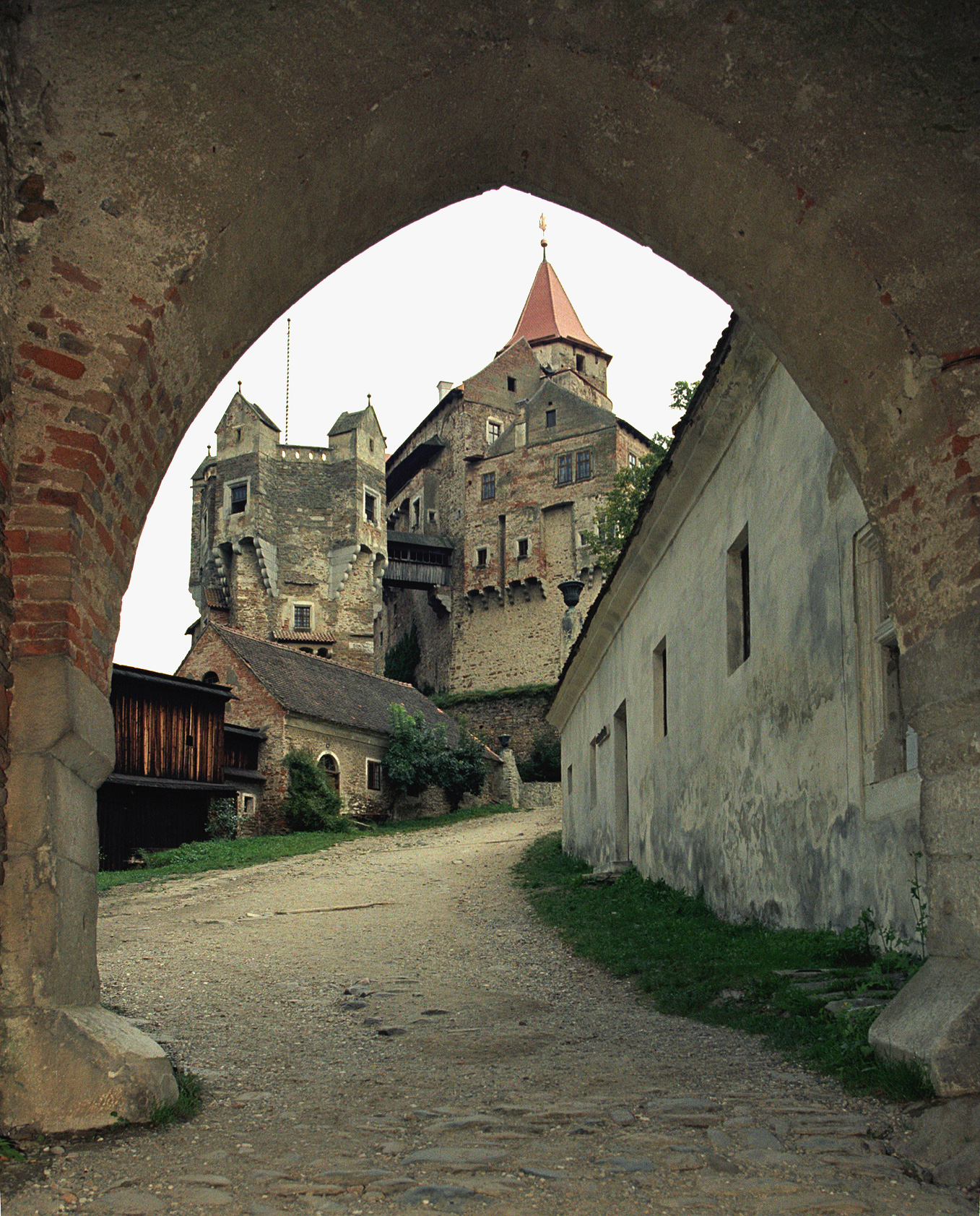
Main entrance gate – detail

In the 17th and 18th centuries the appearance of the castle did not change much. Only some interior changes were preserved, and the stuccowork of the Knights' hall from the years around 1700 or Rococo paintings in the bedroom and in the Chinese parlour from the 1760s. Outbuildings were erected around the castle; a new Baroque chapel with fresco paintings by Francis Gregor Ignacus Eckstein from 1716 replaced the older castle chapel. The new owners had their coat-of-arms sculpted in the rock, and kept on spreading the original park. East of the barbican there is an old yew-tree connected with the tales of the foundation of the castle. Its circuit is 4.5 metres (15 ft) and it is the oldest and biggest yew in the southern Moravian region.

In 1818 the castle came to the hands of the Mitrovský family. The castle obtained its actual appearance partly down to the Mitrovský family who refused to succumb to the Romantic styles of the 19th century and partly due to the fact that the castle has never suffered at the hands of their enemies. The gate of the first settlement is protected by the older forward fortifications from the beginning of the 16th century. In the prolate settlement there are several outbuilding and a renaissance bastion with a gate, into which the original driveway issues. The road to the castle surmounts the moat and barbican across a baroque bridge. The corridor between the two ramparts, characteristic of the Pernštejn fortifications, lead to the gate of the second settlement (from the turn of the 14th and 15th centuries) with Gothic-Renaissance marble portal. The barbican complex and the second settlement are surrounded by a revetted moat, across which a stairway in the south leads to terrace garden. Gothic bridges issues to the protruding tower of the third gate, through the marble portal of which we can enter the settlement around the inner castle. On the right, there is a unified Gothic building, which was formed by joining of the gradually accumulated building at the end of the 15th century. In the southern part built in the mid-15th century there is a large round tower. Toward the north there spreads a line of Renaissance and older administrative building. After passing through the Black Gate the way leads across another Gothic bridge to eastern parts of the settlement. In the east this part ends by a round Clock tower. In the west a Renaissance chapel adheres to this tower. The Tower of Four Seasons called by the colourful glass in the windows was originally smaller and was incorporated in the rampart during the reign of William I. The access to the bridge into the core of the castle is made on a covered staircase ramp, and the palace core is entered via the late-Gothic portal. The passage leads directly to the main communication space of the castle, the passage to the right leads to the small Tyrolian Yard. In the northwestern corner of the castle core there stands five-storey Barborka tower with an edge turned toward the driveway. A two-tract palace stood in the south, with its cellars partly dug in the rock. The large Knights' hall on the first floor was completely rebuilt and its Renaissance vault was decorated with stuccowork and fresco paintings.

During the rule of John I the last medieval expansion of residential and representative rooms was achieved: the new renaissance palace was attached to the core and the residential tower in the southeast. On the ground floor there is a vaulted passage of the Black Gate, on the first floor there is a big hall with three fields of Renaissance cross vault used as a library since the 19th century. The first floor contains five representative chambers, the largest of which is the picture gallery. With the exception of Baroque ceilings and Rococo decoration they are preserved in the original Renaissance form.

During the reconstruction works on Pernštejn dozens of inscriptions (in Czech, German and Latin) and paintings dating back mostly to the mid-16th century were discovered under the passage plastering. They are an interesting proof of the life in the castle and of the cultural profile of the time. Today the castle is a property of the state. This unique architectural heritage has been lately conserved and made accessible to serve as a document of what the seat of prominent lords of the country looked like.

The castle was used as a filming location of Nosferatu (2024).

== See also ==
- List of castles in the Moravian-Silesian Region
- List of castles in the South Moravian Region
