= Nedvědice =

- Market town
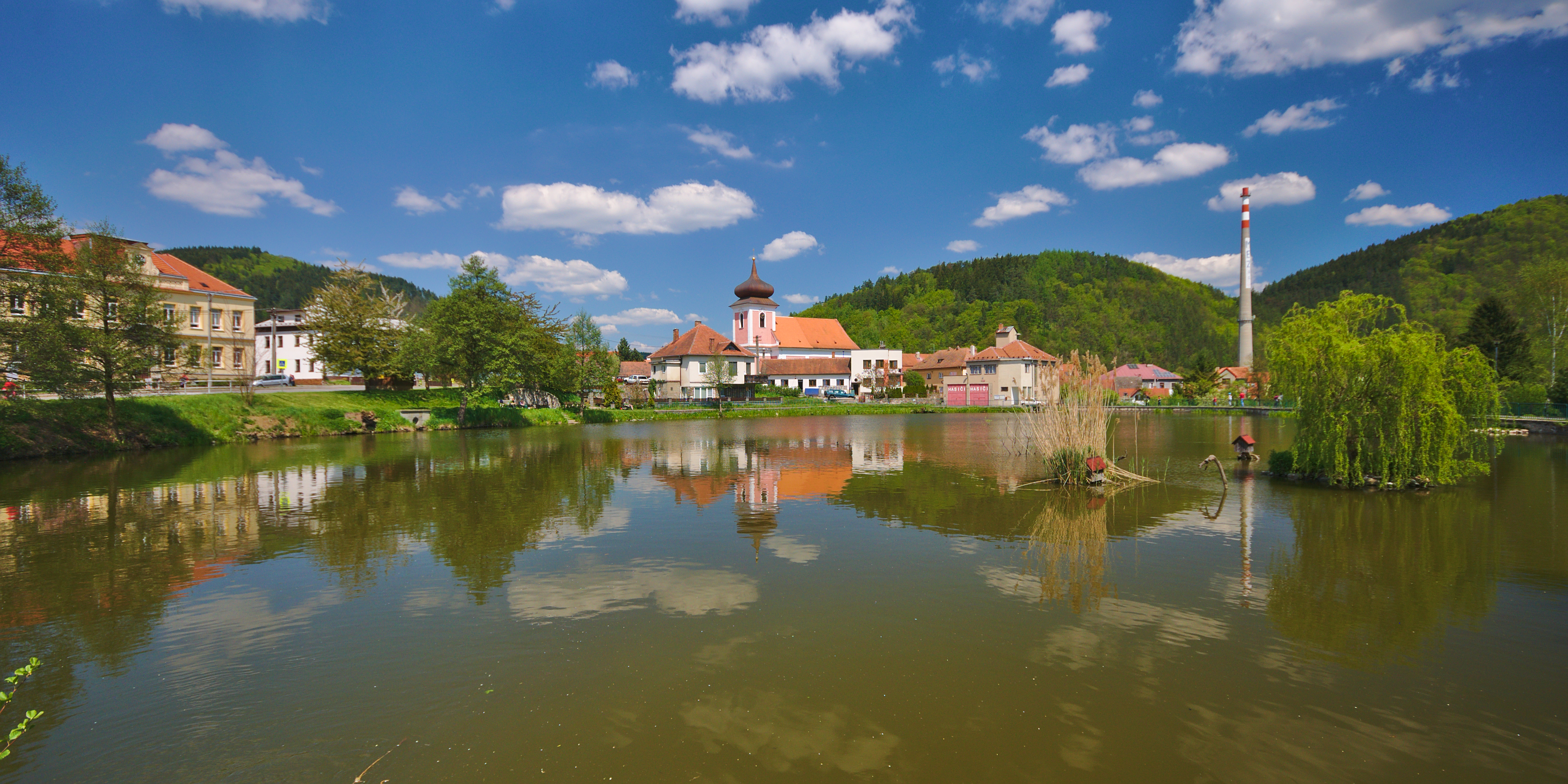
- A pond in the centre of Nedvědice

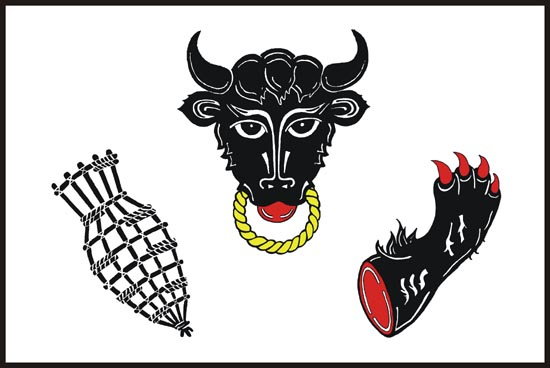
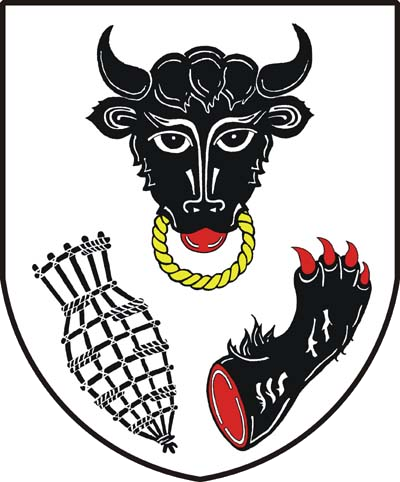
- Flag Coat of arms

- Location in the Czech Republic
- Coordinates: 49°27′25″N 16°20′3″E
- Country: Czech Republic
- Region: South Moravian
- District: Brno-Country
- First mentioned: 1350

Area
  - Total: 6.54 km^{2} (2.53 sq mi)
- Elevation: 324 m (1,063 ft)

Population (2026-01-01)
  - Total: 1,268
  - Density: 194/km^{2} (502/sq mi)
- Time zone: UTC+1 (CET)
  - Summer (DST): UTC+2 (CEST)
- Postal code: 592 62
- Website: www.nedvedice.cz

Nedvědice (Czech pronunciation: [ˈnɛdvjɛɟɪtsɛ]) is a market town in Brno-Country District in the South Moravian Region of the Czech Republic. It has about 1,300 inhabitants.

== Administrative division ==
Nedvědice consists of two municipal parts (in brackets population according to the 2021 census):

- Nedvědice (1,215)
- Pernštejn (50)

== Geography ==
Nedvědice is located about 32 kilometres (20 mi) northwest of Brno. It lies in the Upper Svratka Highlands. The highest point is the hill Na Sedlátkách at 536 m (1,759 ft) above sea level. The market town is situated at the confluence of the Svratka and Nedvědička rivers.

== History ==
The first written mention of Nedvědice is from 1350, when it was a property of the Pernštejn family. In 1482, it was first documented as a market town. In the 16th century, Nedvědice was a prosperous market town with income from brewing and crafts, especially stonemasonry. Marble was mined here. The Pernštejn family owned the estate until 1596, when they sold it due to debts. In 1629, the estate was acquired by the Lichtenstein-Kastelkorn family by marriage. During the Thirty Years' War, Pernštejn Castle was not conquered, but Nedvědice was badly damaged and depopulated.

== Demographics ==
Historical population

Year	Pop.	±%
1869	1,062	—
1880	950	−10.5%
1890	974	+2.5%
1900	941	−3.4%
1910	1,272	+35.2%

Year	Pop.	±%
1921	1,370	+7.7%
1930	1,247	−9.0%
1950	1,313	+5.3%
1961	1,415	+7.8%
1970	1,470	+3.9%

Year	Pop.	±%
1980	1,551	+5.5%
1991	1,443	−7.0%
2001	1,329	−7.9%
2011	1,317	−0.9%
2021	1,265	−3.9%

Source: Censuses

== Transport ==
Nedvědice is located on the railway line Žďár nad Sázavou–Tišnov.

== Sights ==
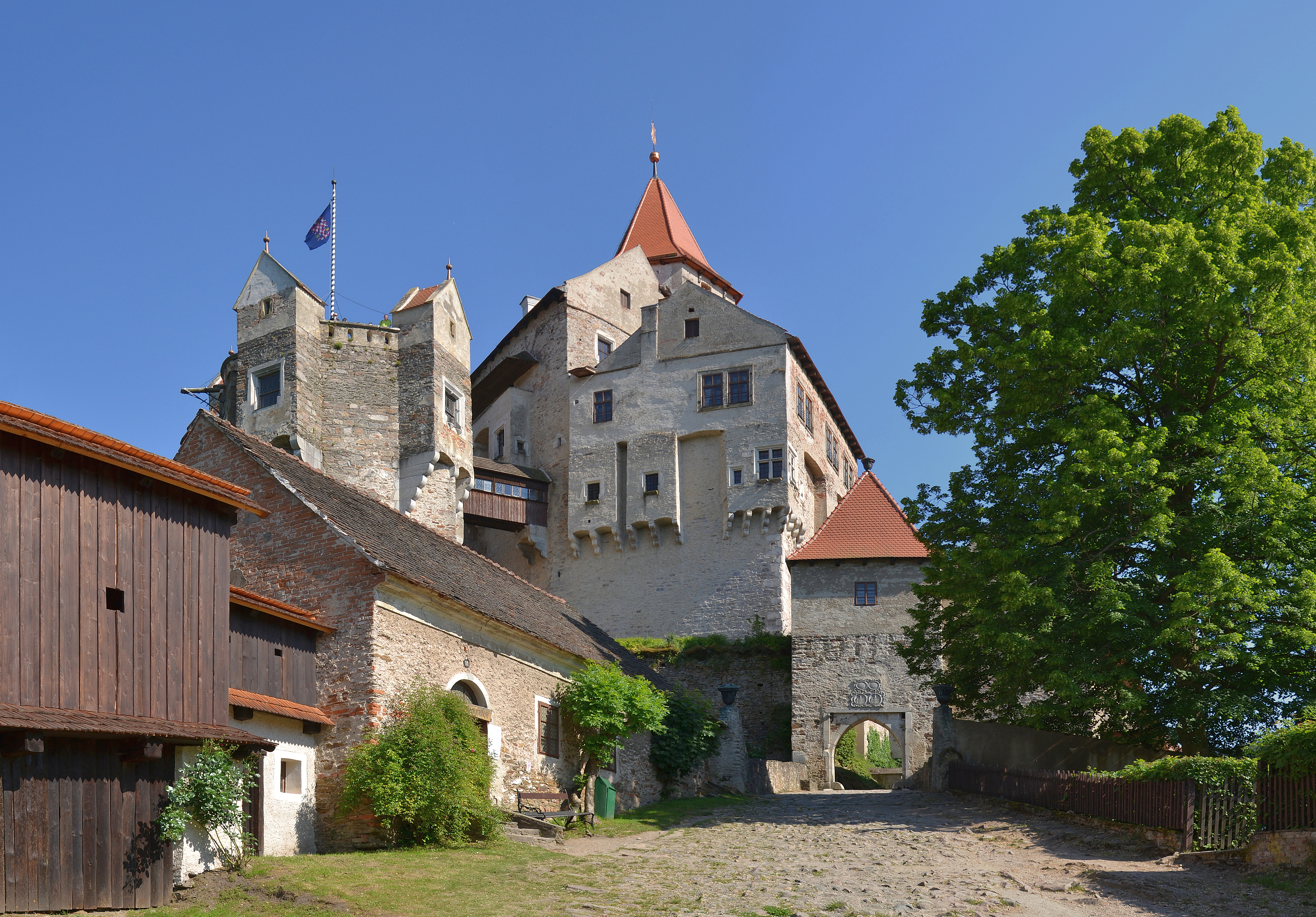
Pernštejn Castle

Nedvědice is known for the Pernštejn Castle, located on a rocky promontory above the Nedvědička. It is one of the most valuable and best-preserved castles in the Czech Republic with a rich history dating back to the 13th century. The castle is protected as national cultural monument. Today the castle is owned by the state. It is open to the public and offers guided tours.

The main landmark of the centre of Nedvědice is the Church of Saint Cunigunde. It is a Baroque building with a Gothic core dating from around 1420.

== Notable people ==
- Anton Emil Titl (1809–1882), Austrian composer and conductor
