= William Markowitz =

American astronomer (1907–1998)

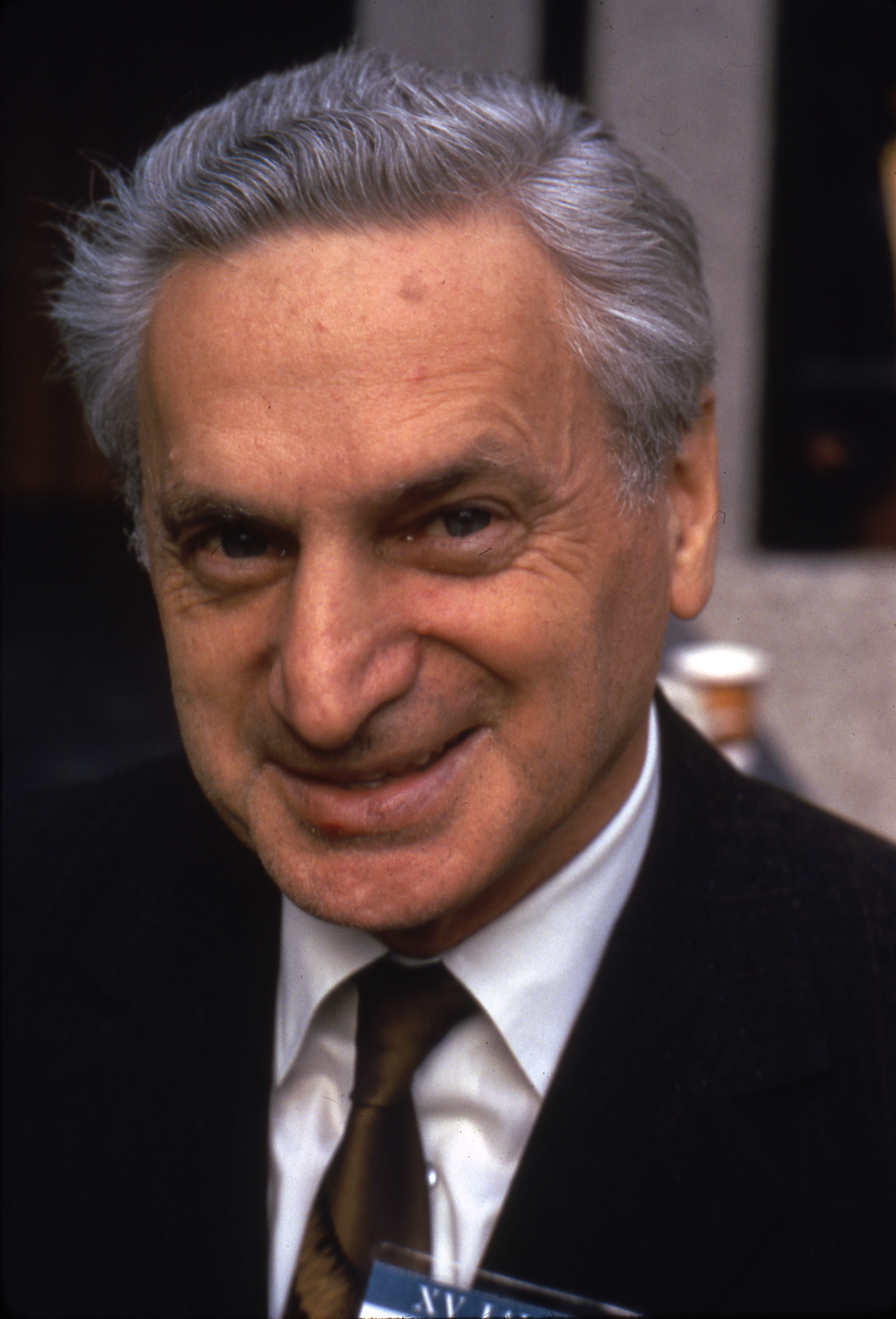
- Markowitz in 1973
- Born: February 8, 1907; Melč, Austrian Silesia (now Czech Republic)
- Died: October 10, 1998 (aged 91); Pompano Beach, Florida, United States
- Education: University of Chicago (PhD)
- Spouse: Rosalyn Shulemson (m. 1943)
- Children: 1
- Scientific career
- Fields: Astronomy
- Workplaces: Yerkes Observatory; Pennsylvania State College; United States Naval Observatory; Marquette University; Nova University
- Doctoral advisor: William Duncan MacMillan

William Markowitz (February 8, 1907 – October 10, 1998) was an American astronomer known for his work on the standardization of time.

== Early life and education ==
William Markowitz was born Melč in Austrian Silesia (now in the Czech Republic) on February 8, 1907. His mother had been visiting from her native Poland. The family emigrated to the United States in 1910, settling in Chicago.

Markowitz obtained his doctorate from the University of Chicago in 1931 under the supervision of William Duncan MacMillan with a thesis on the statistics of binary stars.

== Career ==
He taught at Pennsylvania State College before joining the United States Naval Observatory in 1936, working under Paul Sollenberger and Gerald Clemence in the time service department.

Markowitz eventually became director of the department. He developed the ephemeris time scale, which had been adopted by the IAU in 1952 on a proposal formulated by Clemence in 1948, as an international time standard. He subsequently worked with Louis Essen in England to calibrate the newly developed atomic clocks in terms of the ephemeris second. The fundamental frequency of caesium atomic clocks, which they determined as 9,192,631,770 ± 20 Hz, was used to define the second internationally since 1967. At the International Astronomical Union (IAU) meeting in Dublin in 1955, he had proposed the system of distinguishing between variants of Universal Time, as UT0 (UT as directly observed), UT1 (reduced to invariable meridian by correcting to remove effect of polar motion) and UT2 (further corrected to remove (extrapolated) seasonal variation in Earth rotation rate), a system which remains in some use today.

He served as President of the IAU commission on time from 1955 to 1961, and was active in the International Union of Geodesy and Geophysics, the American Geophysical Union, and the International Consultative Committee for the Definition of the Second.

After retiring from USNO in 1966, Markowitz served as professor of physics at Marquette University until 1972, and also held a post at Nova Southeastern University.

== Personal life ==
Markowitz married Rosalyn Shulemson in 1943. Markowitz died on October 10, 1998 at the age of 91.
