= Raduň =

- Municipality
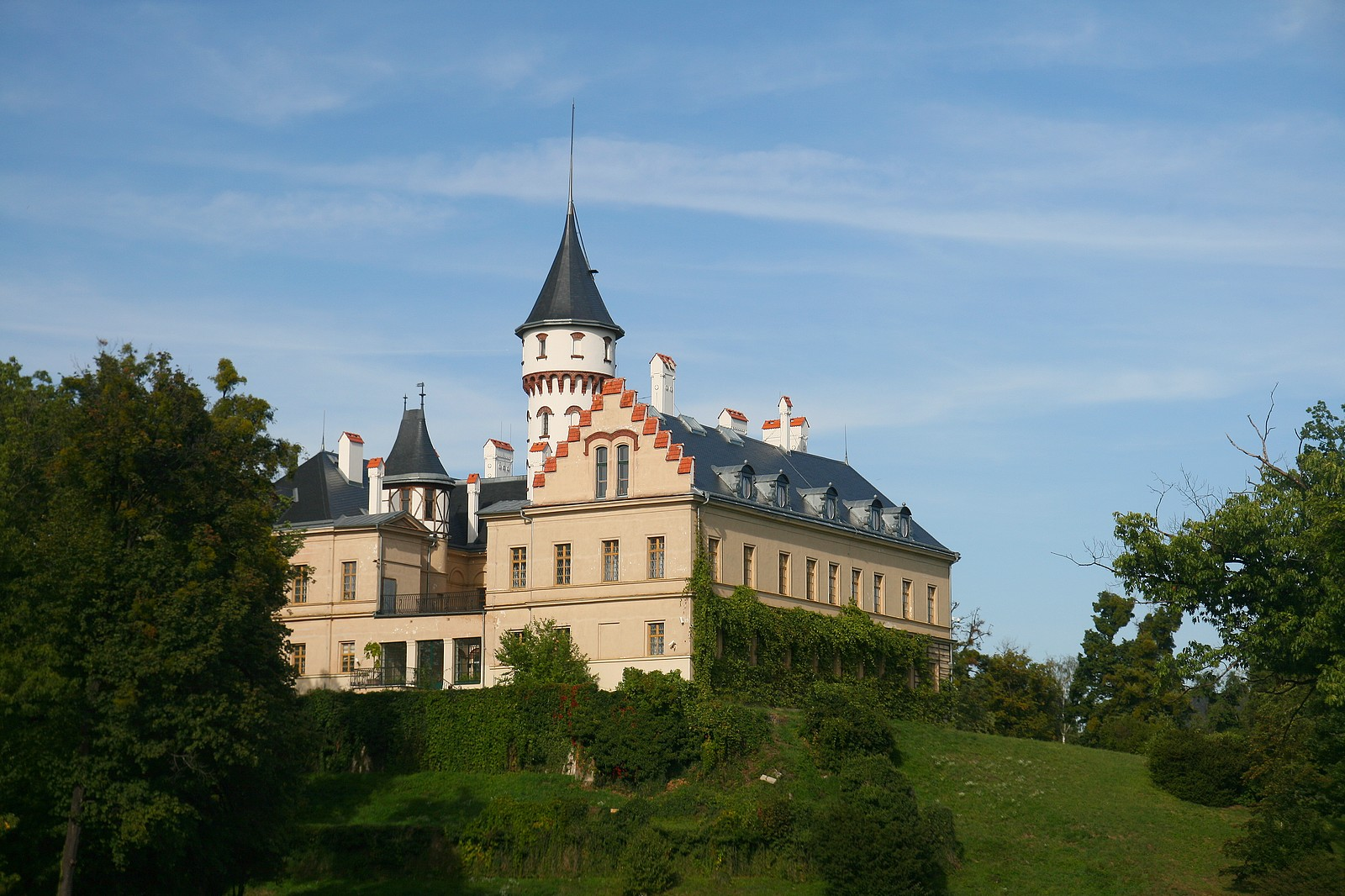
- Raduň Castle

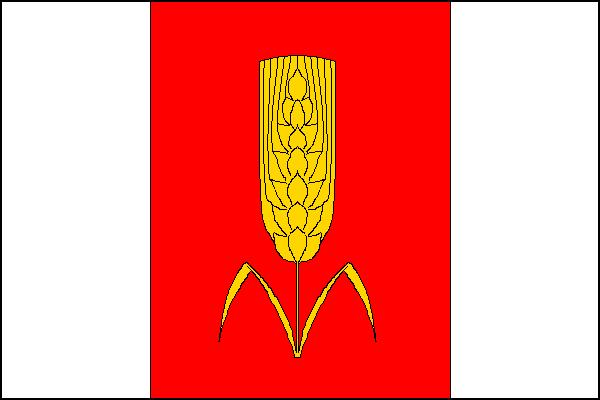
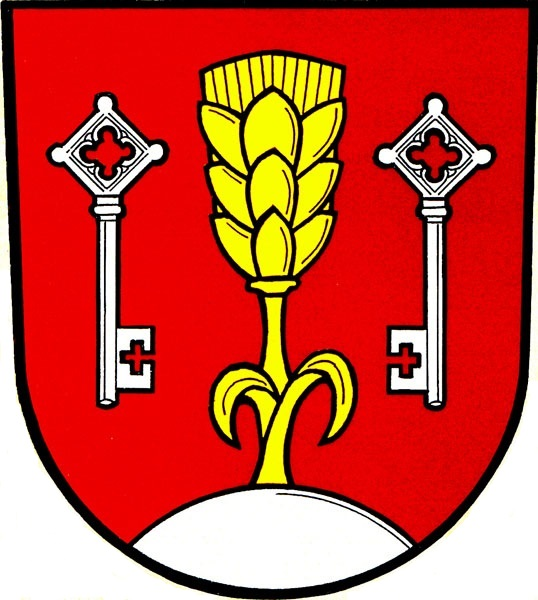
- Flag Coat of arms

- Location in the Czech Republic
- Coordinates: 49°53′34″N 17°56′36″E
- Country: Czech Republic
- Region: Moravian-Silesian
- District: Opava
- First mentioned: 1320

Area
  - Total: 8.02 km^{2} (3.10 sq mi)
- Elevation: 284 m (932 ft)

Population (2026-01-01)
  - Total: 1,184
  - Density: 148/km^{2} (382/sq mi)
- Time zone: UTC+1 (CET)
  - Summer (DST): UTC+2 (CEST)
- Postal code: 747 61
- Website: www.obec-radun.cz

Raduň is a municipality and village in Opava District in the Moravian-Silesian Region of the Czech Republic. It has about 1,200 inhabitants.

== History ==
The first written mention of Raduň is from 1320.

== Demographics ==
Historical population
Year	Pop.	±%
1869	565	—
1880	564	−0.2%
1890	544	−3.5%
1900	560	+2.9%
1910	638	+13.9%
1921	589	−7.7%
1930	717	+21.7%
1950	769	+7.3%
1961	913	+18.7%
1970	938	+2.7%
1980	965	+2.9%
1991	971	+0.6%
2001	958	−1.3%
2011	943	−1.6%
2021	1,142	+21.1%
Source: Censuses
