= Spálov =

- Market town
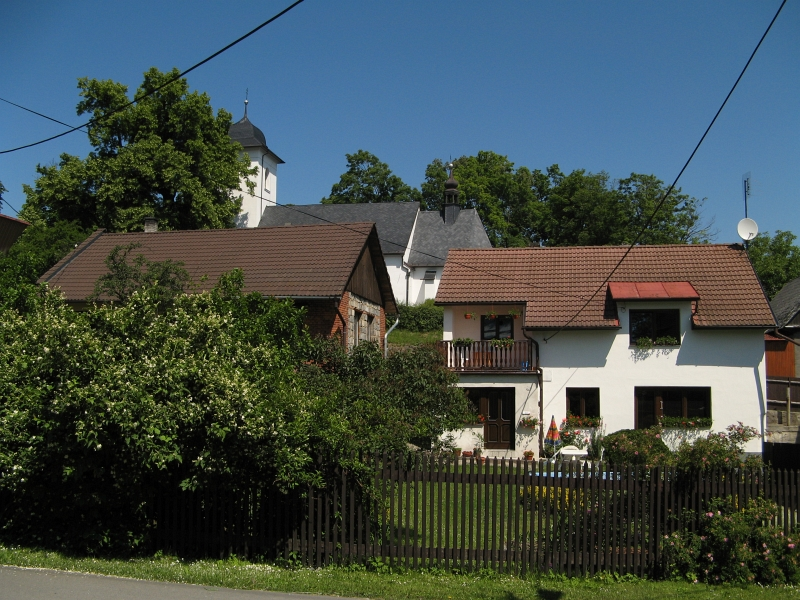
- Church of Saint James the Great

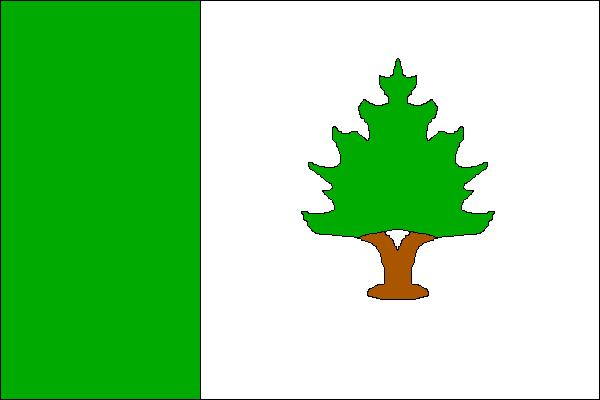
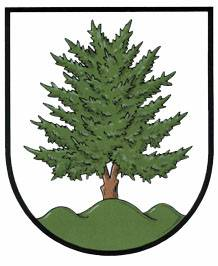
- Flag Coat of arms

- Location in the Czech Republic
- Coordinates: 49°42′15″N 17°43′21″E
- Country: Czech Republic
- Region: Moravian-Silesian
- District: Nový Jičín
- First mentioned: 1394

Area
  - Total: 19.32 km^{2} (7.46 sq mi)
- Elevation: 549 m (1,801 ft)

Population (2026-01-01)
  - Total: 917
  - Density: 47.5/km^{2} (123/sq mi)
- Time zone: UTC+1 (CET)
  - Summer (DST): UTC+2 (CEST)
- Postal code: 742 37
- Website: www.spalov.cz

Spálov (Czech pronunciation: [ˈspaːlof]; German: Sponau) is a market town in Nový Jičín District in the Moravian-Silesian Region of the Czech Republic. It has about 900 inhabitants.

== Geography ==
Spálov is located about 24 kilometres (15 mi) northwest of Nový Jičín and 38 km (24 mi) west of Ostrava. It lies in the Nízký Jeseník range. The highest point is the hill Častochov at 587 m (1,926 ft) above sea level. The Oder River flows along the northern municipal border.

== History ==
The first written mention of Spálov is from 1394, when the village belonged to the Potštát estate. This was valid up to 1611, when Spálov became a separate estate. In 1669, Spálov was bought by the Schertz family. They introduced silver mining here and rebuilt the local fortress into a castle. From 1743 to 1883, the estate was owned by the Záviš family. During their rule, in 1828, Spálov was promoted to a market town.

== Demographics ==
Historical population

Year	Pop.	±%
1869	1,317	—
1880	1,291	−2.0%
1890	1,248	−3.3%
1900	1,254	+0.5%
1910	1,292	+3.0%

Year	Pop.	±%
1921	1,291	−0.1%
1930	1,282	−0.7%
1950	988	−22.9%
1961	1,052	+6.5%
1970	1,000	−4.9%

Year	Pop.	±%
1980	961	−3.9%
1991	906	−5.7%
2001	920	+1.5%
2011	883	−4.0%
2021	860	−2.6%

Source: Censuses

== Transport ==
There are no railways or major roads passing through the municipality.

== Sights ==
The main landmark of Spálov is the Church of Saint James the Great. It was originally a late Gothic church, rebuilt in the Baroque style in 1732–1734.
