= Slezské Pavlovice =

- Municipality
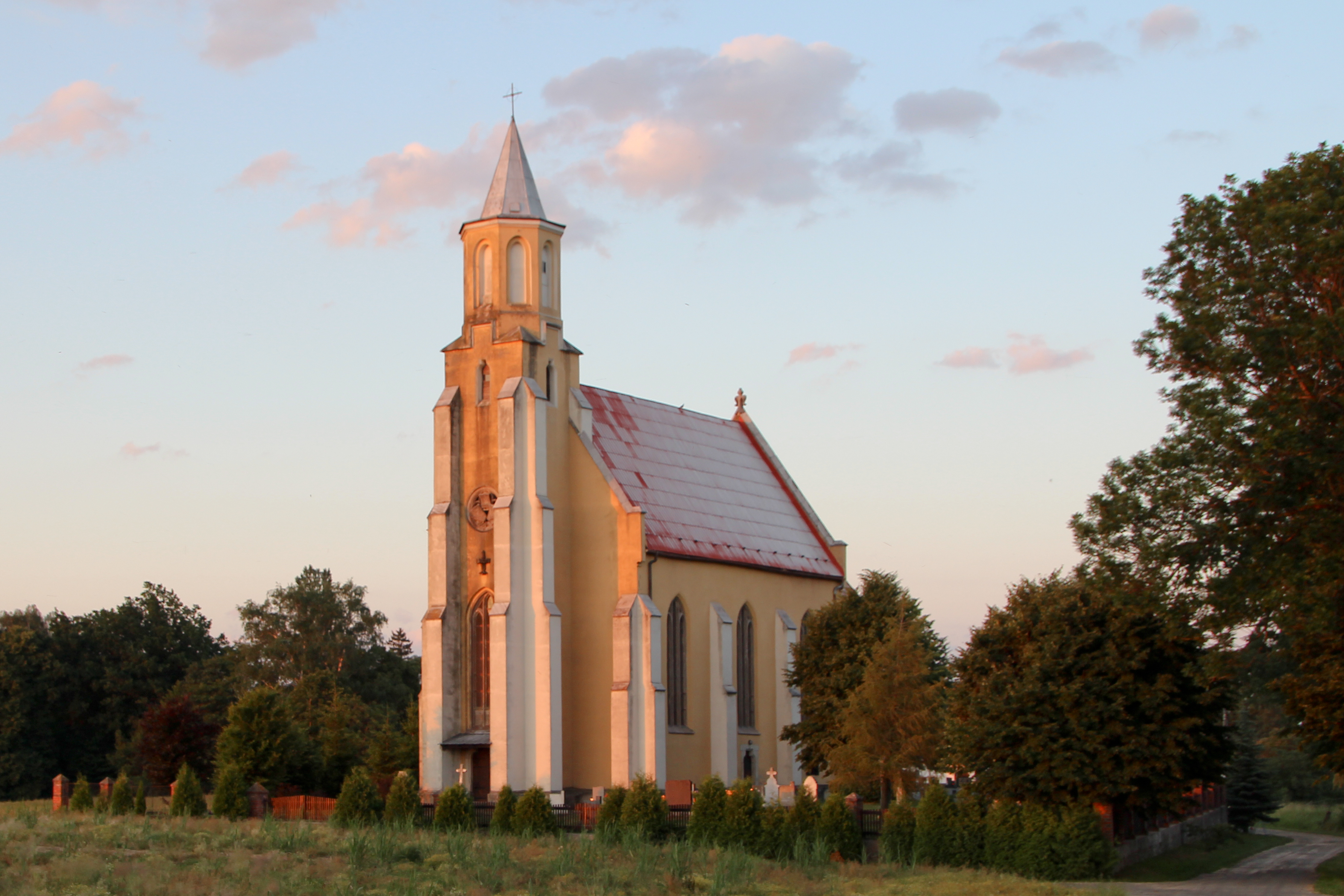
- Church of Saint Andrew

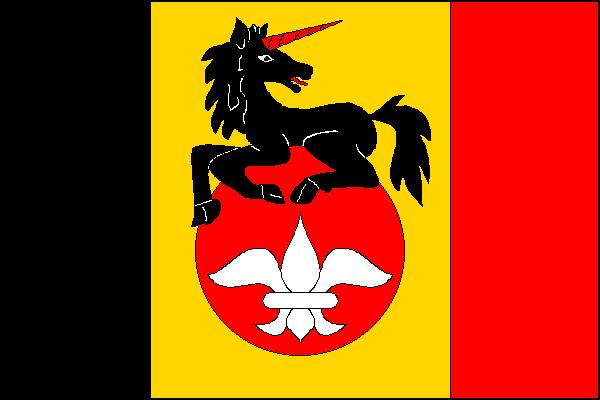
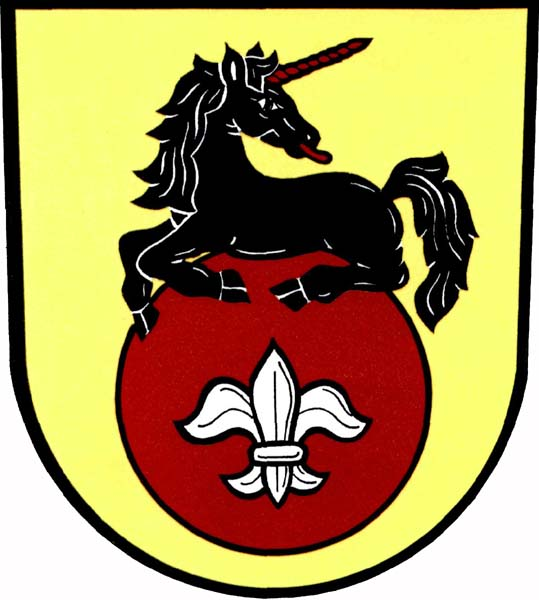
- Flag Coat of arms

- Location in the Czech Republic
- Coordinates: 50°18′43″N 17°42′11″E
- Country: Czech Republic
- Region: Moravian-Silesian
- District: Bruntál
- First mentioned: 1267

Area
  - Total: 6.63 km^{2} (2.56 sq mi)
- Elevation: 200 m (660 ft)

Population (2026-01-01)
  - Total: 177
  - Density: 26.7/km^{2} (69.1/sq mi)
- Time zone: UTC+1 (CET)
  - Summer (DST): UTC+2 (CEST)
- Postal code: 793 99
- Website: www.slezskepavlovice.cz

Slezské Pavlovice (until 1947 Německé Pavlovice; German: Deutsch Paulowitz) is a municipality and village in Bruntál District in the Moravian-Silesian Region of the Czech Republic. It has about 200 inhabitants.

== Geography ==
Slezské Pavlovice is located about 39 kilometres (24 mi) north of Bruntál and 65 km (40 mi) northwest of Ostrava. It is situated in the northernmost part of the Osoblažsko microregion, on the border with Poland. It lies in a flat landscape in the Opava Hilly Land.

Slezské Pavlovice is situated on the left bank of the Prudnik River. The stream Pavlovický potok, a tributary of the Prudnik, flows through the village. The fishpond Pavlovický rybník II, supplied by the stream, is part of the Osoblažský výběžek Nature Monument. The second small-scaled protected area is the Džungle Nature Reserve.

== History ==
According to archaeological findings, the original settlement of the area dates back to the Early Bronze Age. The first written mention of Pavlovice is in a deed of the bishop Bruno von Schauenburg from 1267.

The village was settled by Germans and until 1947, it was called Německé Pavlovice (Deutsch Paulowitz, i.e. 'German Pavlovice'). After World War II, the German-speaking population was expelled and the municipality was renamed.

== Demographics ==
Historical population

Year	Pop.	±%
1869	555	—
1880	580	+4.5%
1890	531	−8.4%
1900	497	−6.4%
1910	497	+0.0%

Year	Pop.	±%
1921	437	−12.1%
1930	427	−2.3%
1950	231	−45.9%
1961	295	+27.7%
1970	260	−11.9%

Year	Pop.	±%
1980	246	−5.4%
1991	213	−13.4%
2001	189	−11.3%
2011	195	+3.2%
2021	163	−16.4%

Source: Censuses

== Transport ==
There are no railways or major roads passing through the municipality.

== Sights ==
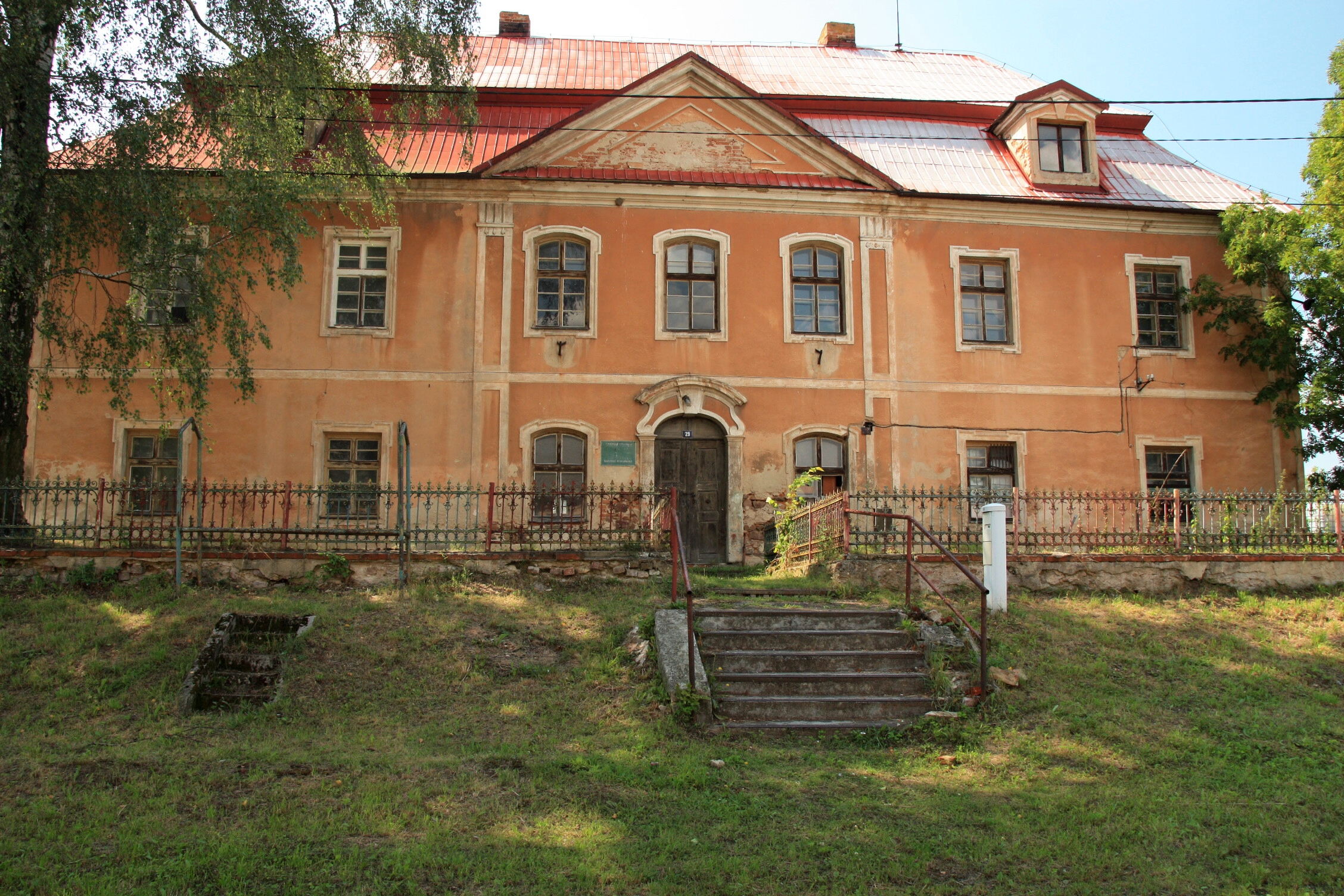
Slezské Pavlovice Castle

The main landmark of the village is the Church of Saint Andrew. It is a neo-Gothic building, built on the initiative of the Archbishop of Olomouc Friedrich Egon von Fürstenberg in 1869–1871.

A significant monument is the Slezské Pavlovice Castle. The fortress, which probably existed since the 14th century, was rebuilt into a Renaissance castle during the rule of the Sup of Fulštejn family in 1557, and then into a Baroque castle during the rule of the Mattencloit family in 1776. During the interwar period the castle was given to the Just family who owned it until 1945. After the war it became the state property. Today it is owned by a private owner.

Other sights in the municipality include a Baroque statue of John of Nepomuk from the second half of the 18th century and a monument to the victims of World War I.
