= Medlice =

- Municipality
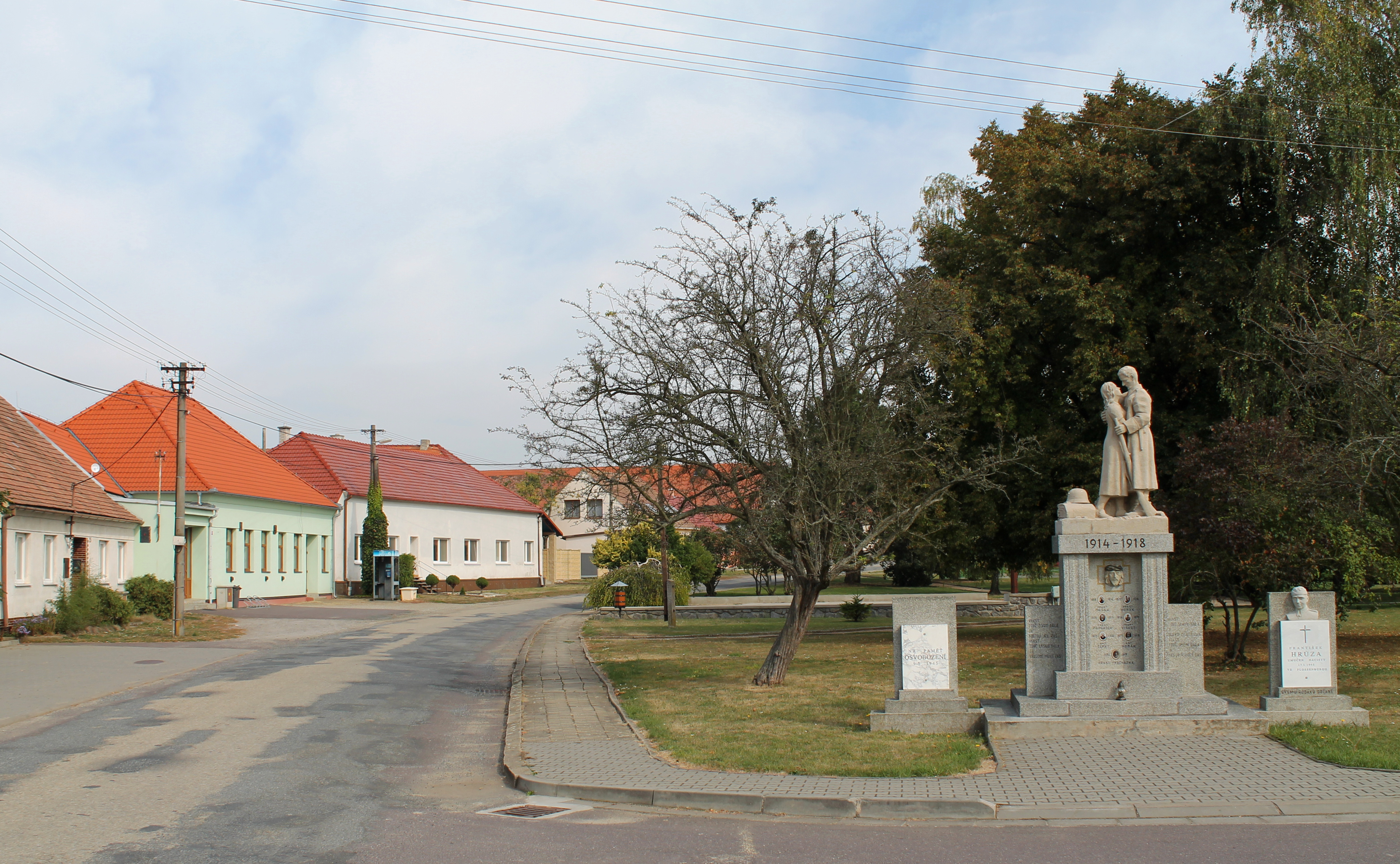
- Centre of Medlice

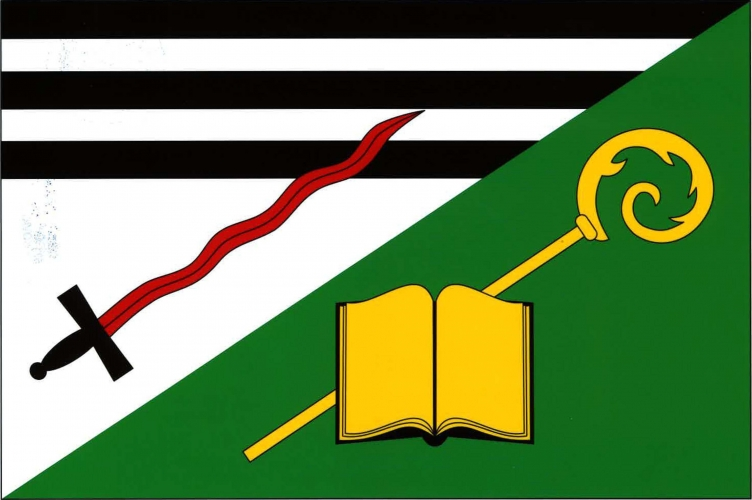
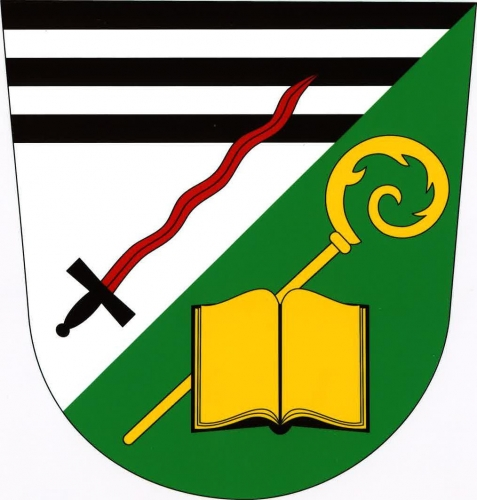
- Flag Coat of arms

- Location in the Czech Republic
- Coordinates: 49°0′11″N 16°7′17″E
- Country: Czech Republic
- Region: South Moravian
- District: Znojmo
- First mentioned: 1285

Area
  - Total: 6.98 km^{2} (2.69 sq mi)
- Elevation: 358 m (1,175 ft)

Population (2026-01-01)
  - Total: 165
  - Density: 23.6/km^{2} (61.2/sq mi)
- Time zone: UTC+1 (CET)
  - Summer (DST): UTC+2 (CEST)
- Postal code: 671 40
- Website: www.medlice.cz

Medlice is a municipality and village in Znojmo District in the South Moravian Region of the Czech Republic. It has about 200 inhabitants.

Medlice lies approximately 19 kilometres (12 mi) north-east of Znojmo, 42 km (26 mi) south-west of Brno, and 173 km (107 mi) south-east of Prague.

== History ==
The first written mention of Medlice is from 1285.

== Demographics ==
Historical population
Year	Pop.	±%
1869	308	—
1880	340	+10.4%
1890	353	+3.8%
1900	346	−2.0%
1910	387	+11.8%
1921	437	+12.9%
1930	370	−15.3%
1950	378	+2.2%
1961	362	−4.2%
1970	313	−13.5%
1980	249	−20.4%
1991	202	−18.9%
2001	185	−8.4%
2011	189	+2.2%
2021	161	−14.8%
Source: Censuses
