= Prostřední Bludovice =

Coordinates: 49.762741°N 18.441188°E

Prostřední Bludovice (Polish: Błędowice Średnie, German: Mittel Bludowitz) is a village and administrative part of Horní Bludovice in Karviná District in the Moravian-Silesian Region of the Czech Republic. As of 2021, it had 1,349 inhabitants. The area is 4.84 km^{2} (1.87 sq mi).
