= Vartnov =

Castle in Kmov, Czech Republic

Coordinates: 50°02′17.88″N 17°42′39.96″E

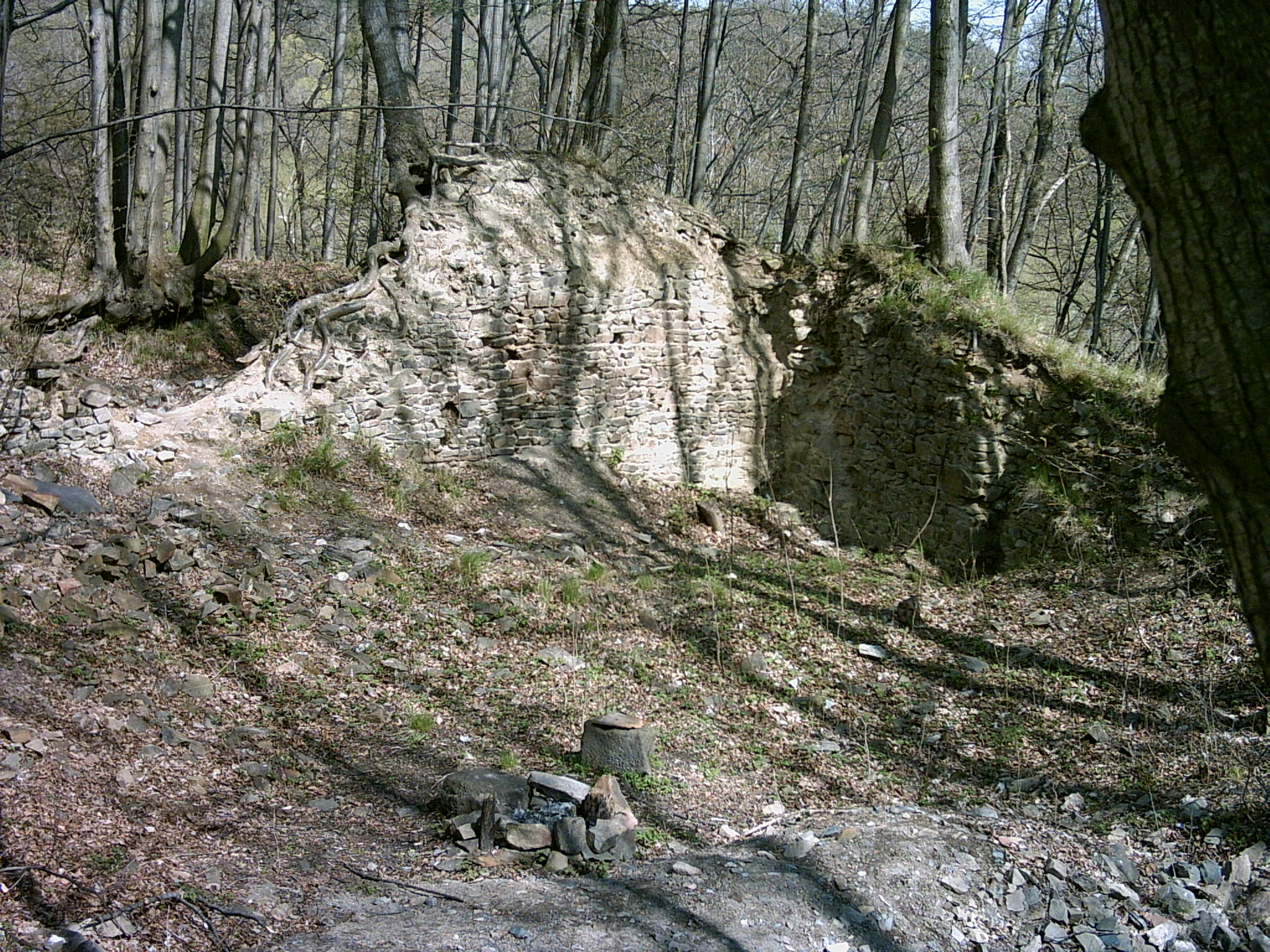
Ruins of castle Vartnov

Vartnov castle is a ruined castle nearly 6 kilometres (4 mi) south of the town of Krnov, Czech Republic.

== History ==
The castle was built in 14th century and is associated with the lords of Wartna. Supposedly in 1349 the castle changed its possessors and it was kept by Vok z Holštejna. His son Štěpán I. was already named by this castle as Štěpán I. z Vartnova. The first written reference is dated to 1377, when the partition of the Duchy of Troppau between the sons of the recently dead duke Nicholas II took place. Vartnovs domain devolved into part of John I of Ratiborz. In 1421 the domain was sold to John II of Ratiborz. The Dukes of Raciborz possessed the castle until 1447, when it was granted by duke Nicholas V to his loyal servant Bernard Bírka z Násile. In 1474 during the war between Bohemia and Hungary the castle was conquered and burned to ashes. It was never rebuilt.
