= Slatina (Nový Jičín District) =

- Municipality
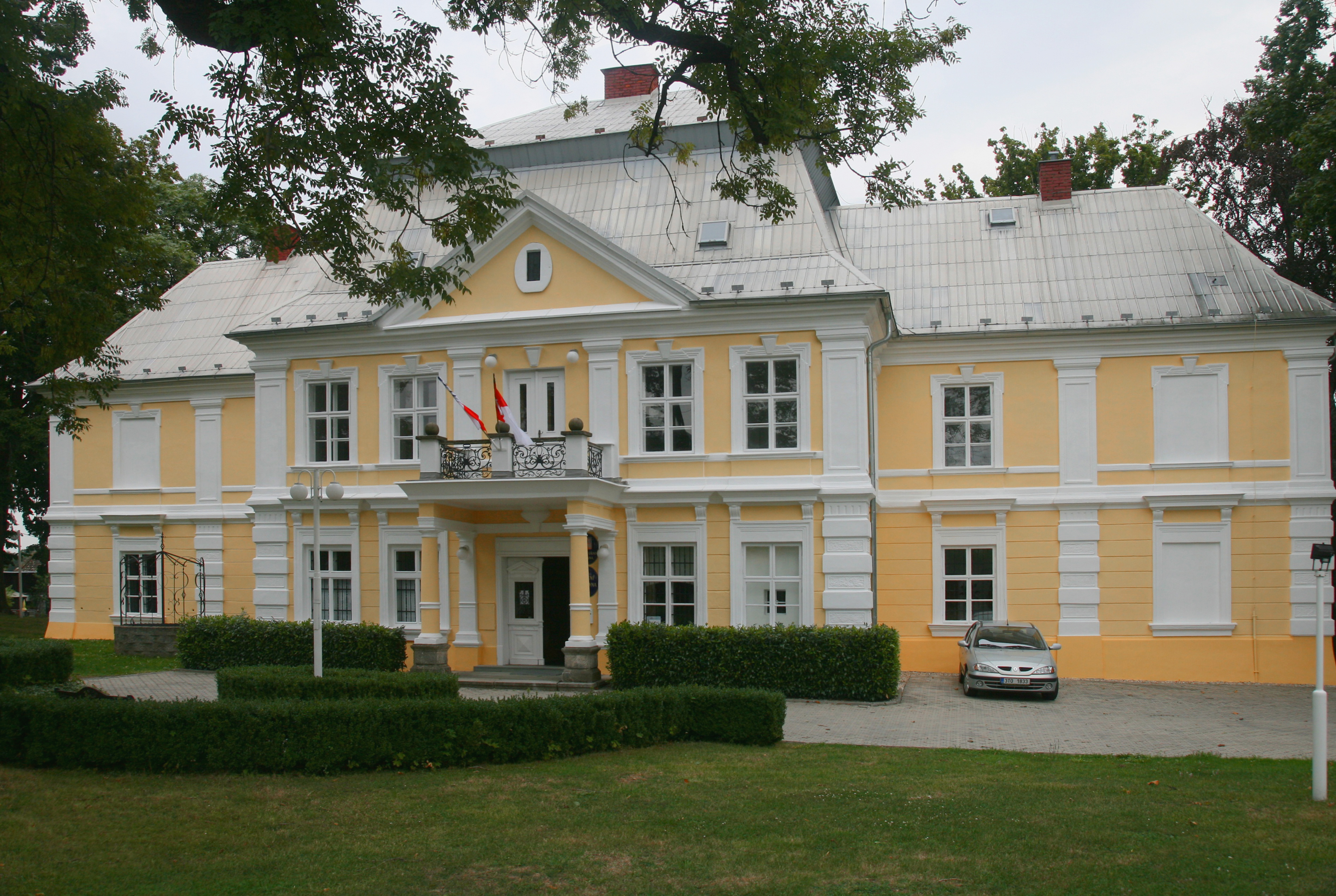
- Slatina Castle

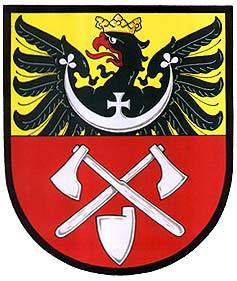
- Flag Coat of arms

- Location in the Czech Republic
- Coordinates: 49°47′27″N 17°58′48″E
- Country: Czech Republic
- Region: Moravian-Silesian
- District: Nový Jičín
- First mentioned: 1371

Area
  - Total: 7.47 km^{2} (2.88 sq mi)
- Elevation: 411 m (1,348 ft)

Population (2026-01-01)
  - Total: 780
  - Density: 100/km^{2} (270/sq mi)
- Time zone: UTC+1 (CET)
  - Summer (DST): UTC+2 (CEST)
- Postal codes: 742 93, 743 01
- Website: www.obecslatina.cz

Slatina (German: Schlatten) is a municipality and village in Nový Jičín District in the Moravian-Silesian Region of the Czech Republic. It has about 800 inhabitants.

== Administrative division ==
Slatina consists of two municipal parts (in brackets population according to the 2021 census):

- Slatina (640)
- Nový Svět (116)

== Demographics ==
Historical population
Year	Pop.	±%
1869	735	—
1880	747	+1.6%
1890	737	−1.3%
1900	818	+11.0%
1910	838	+2.4%
1921	809	−3.5%
1930	818	+1.1%
1950	679	−17.0%
1961	737	+8.5%
1970	678	−8.0%
1980	720	+6.2%
1991	686	−4.7%
2001	679	−1.0%
2011	722	+6.3%
2021	756	+4.7%
Source: Censuses
