= Dolní Tošanovice =

- Municipality
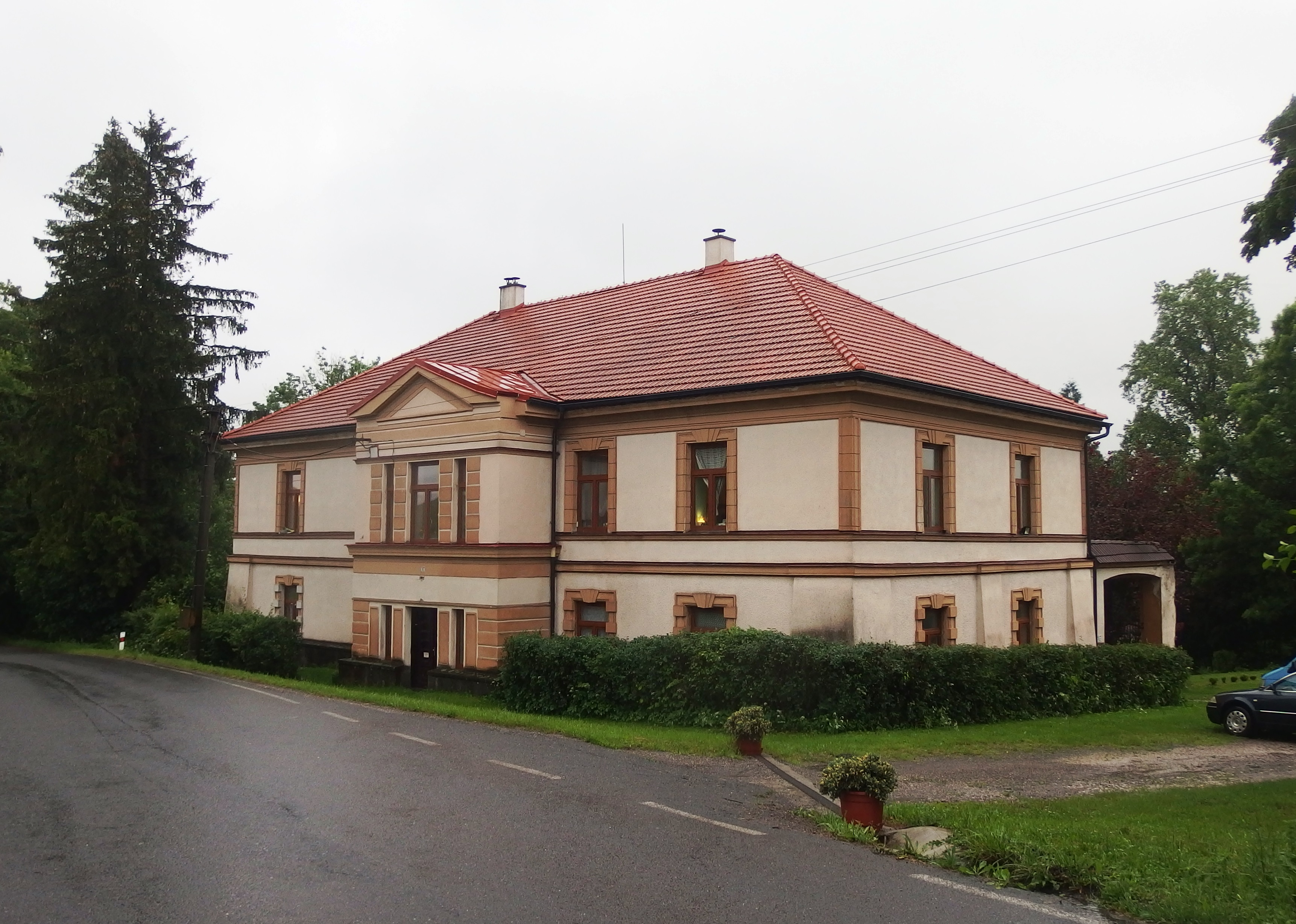
- Manor house

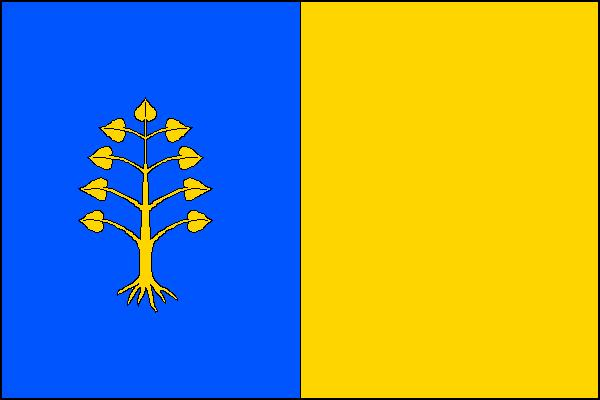
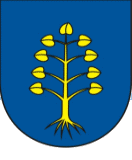
- Flag Coat of arms

- Location in the Czech Republic
- Coordinates: 49°41′3″N 18°29′19″E
- Country: Czech Republic
- Region: Moravian-Silesian
- District: Frýdek-Místek
- First mentioned: 1305

Area
  - Total: 3.70 km^{2} (1.43 sq mi)
- Elevation: 335 m (1,099 ft)

Population (2026-01-01)
  - Total: 434
  - Density: 117/km^{2} (304/sq mi)
- Time zone: UTC+1 (CET)
  - Summer (DST): UTC+2 (CEST)
- Postal code: 739 53
- Website: www.dolnitosanovice.cz

Dolní Tošanovice (Polish: Toszonowice Dolne, German: Nieder Toschonowitz) is a municipality and village in Frýdek-Místek District in the Moravian-Silesian Region of the Czech Republic. It has about 400 inhabitants.

== Etymology ==
The name is derived from personal name Tosz. It was variably subscribed in the historical documents: Tessinowitz (1305), Thusnowitz (1316), Tossinowicze (1445), Tossonowicze (1447, 1693), Toschonowitz (1523), Tossynowicze (1536, 1627), na Tossenowiczych (1703), Toschonowice (1724). In the 18th century the distinction between two villages developed. In 1736 both were mentioned as Nieder Toschonowitz and Ober Toschonowitz (literally "Lower" and "Upper"; Dolní and Horní in Czech).

== Geography ==
Dolní Tošanovice is located about 9 kilometres (6 mi) east of Frýdek-Místek and 19 km (12 mi) southeast of Ostrava. It lies in the historical region of Cieszyn Silesia, in the Moravian-Silesian Foothills.

== History ==
The first written mention of Tošanovice is in a Latin document of Diocese of Wrocław called Liber fundationis episcopatus Vratislaviensis from 1305. The creation of the village was a part of a larger settlement campaign taking place in the late 13th century on the territory of what will be later known as Upper Silesia.

Politically the village belonged initially to the Duchy of Teschen. In 1327 the duchy became a fee of the Kingdom of Bohemia, which after 1526 became part of the Habsburg monarchy.

After Revolutions of 1848 in the Austrian Empire a modern municipal division was introduced in the re-established Austrian Silesia. The village as a municipality was subscribed to the political and legal district of Cieszyn. According to the censuses conducted in 1880–1910, the population of the municipality dropped from 856 in 1880 to 794 in 1910 with a majority being native Czech-speakers (83.6% in 1880, later between 62.4% and 63.9%) accompanied by a Polish-speaking minority (13.9% in 1880, later between 34.6% and 37.4%) and German-speaking (at most 21 or 2.5% in 1880). In terms of religion in 1910 the majority were Roman Catholics (76.1%), followed by Protestants (23.9%).

After World War I, Polish–Czechoslovak War and the division of Cieszyn Silesia in 1920, it became a part of Czechoslovakia. Following the Munich Agreement, in October 1938 together with the Trans-Olza region it was annexed by Poland, administratively adjoined to Cieszyn County of Silesian Voivodeship. It was then annexed by Nazi Germany at the beginning of World War II. After the war it was restored to Czechoslovakia.

== Demographics ==
Historical population

Year	Pop.	±%
1869	420	—
1880	450	+7.1%
1890	376	−16.4%
1900	353	−6.1%
1910	398	+12.7%

Year	Pop.	±%
1921	335	−15.8%
1930	344	+2.7%
1950	283	−17.7%
1961	293	+3.5%
1970	285	−2.7%

Year	Pop.	±%
1980	272	−4.6%
1991	246	−9.6%
2001	279	+13.4%
2011	325	+16.5%
2021	371	+14.2%

Source: Censuses

== Transport ==
The D48 motorway (part of the European route E462) runs through the municipality.

== Sights ==
The only protected cultural monument in Dolní Tošanovice is the former manor house, built in the Empire style at the turn of the 18th and 19th centuries. It was built on the site of a fortress, which was first documented in 1445.
