= Horní Tošanovice =

- Municipality
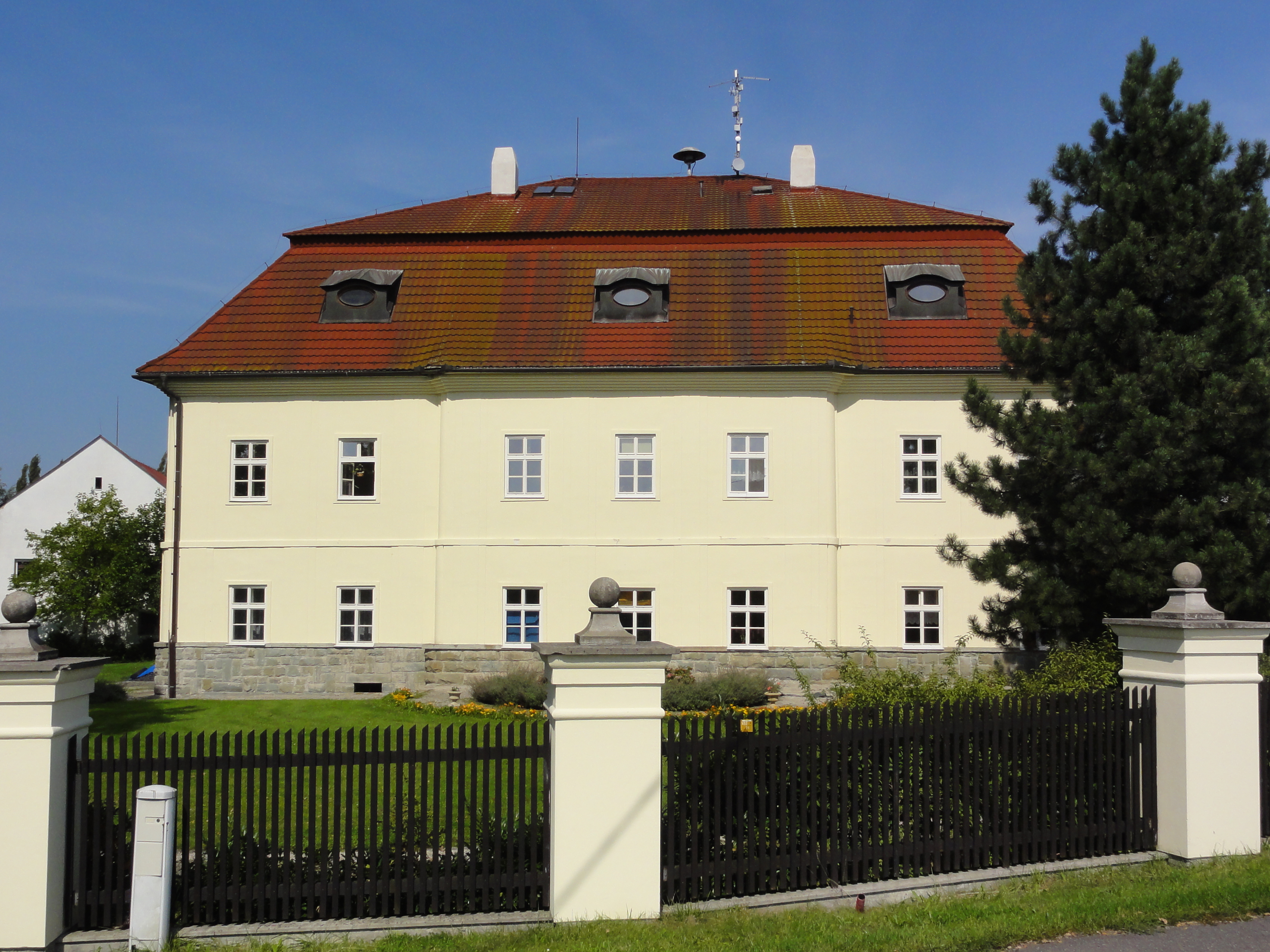
- Manor house

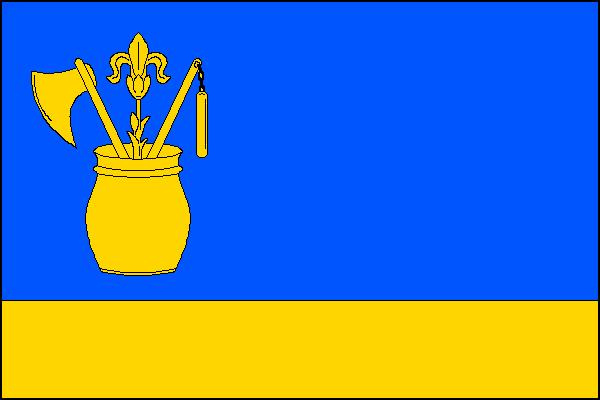
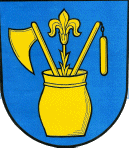
- Flag Coat of arms

- Location in the Czech Republic
- Coordinates: 49°41′32″N 18°30′19″E
- Country: Czech Republic
- Region: Moravian-Silesian
- District: Frýdek-Místek
- First mentioned: 1305

Area
  - Total: 5.29 km^{2} (2.04 sq mi)
- Elevation: 367 m (1,204 ft)

Population (2026-01-01)
  - Total: 742
  - Density: 140/km^{2} (363/sq mi)
- Time zone: UTC+1 (CET)
  - Summer (DST): UTC+2 (CEST)
- Postal code: 739 53
- Website: www.hornitosanovice.cz

Horní Tošanovice (Polish: Toszonowice Górne) is a municipality and village in Frýdek-Místek District in the Moravian-Silesian Region of the Czech Republic. It has about 700 inhabitants.

== Etymology ==
The name is derived from personal name Tosz. It was variably subscribed in the historical documents: Tessinowitz (1305), Thusnowitz (1316), Tossinowicze (1445), Tossonowicze (1447, 1693), Toschonowitz (1523), Tossynowicze (1536, 1627), na Tossenowiczych (1703), Toschonowice (1724). In the 18th century the distinction between two villages developed. In 1736 both were mentioned as Nieder Toschonowitz and Ober Toschonowitz (literally 'lower' and 'upper'; Dolní and Horní in Czech).

== Geography ==
Horní Tošanovice is located about 10 kilometres (6 mi) east of Frýdek-Místek and 19 km (12 mi) southeast of Ostrava. It lies in the Moravian-Silesian Foothills, in the historical region of Cieszyn Silesia. The highest point is at 409 m (1,342 ft) above sea level.

== History ==
The first written mention of Tošanovice is in a Latin document of Diocese of Wrocław called Liber fundationis episcopatus Vratislaviensis from 1305. The village was probably founded in the 13th century. In 1445–1753, the manor was owned by the noble family of Tluka of Tošanovice. In the 1830s during the rule of the Harasovský family, an Empire manor house with a small English park was built here.

Politically the village belonged initially to the Duchy of Teschen. In 1327 the duchy became a fee of the Kingdom of Bohemia, which after 1526 became part of the Habsburg monarchy.

After Revolutions of 1848 in the Austrian Empire, a modern municipal division was introduced in the re-established Austrian Silesia. The village as a municipality was subscribed to the political and legal district of Cieszyn. According to the censuses conducted in 1880–1910, the population of the municipality grew from 460 in 1880 to 472 in 1910 with a majority being native Polish-speakers (52.2% in 1880, later between 88% and 93.1%) accompanied by a Czech-speaking minority (46% in 1880, later between 6.1% and 9.5%) and German-speaking (at most eight or 2.5% in 1900). In terms of religion in 1910 the majority were Roman Catholics (74.8%), followed by Protestants (25.2%).

After World War I, Polish–Czechoslovak War and the division of Cieszyn Silesia in 1920, Horní Tošanovice became a part of Czechoslovakia. Following the Munich Agreement, in October 1938 together with the Trans-Olza region it was annexed by Poland, administratively adjoined to Cieszyn County of Silesian Voivodeship. It was then annexed by Nazi Germany at the beginning of World War II. After the war it was restored to Czechoslovakia.

== Demographics ==
Historical population

| Year | Pop. | ±% |
|---|---|---|
| 1869 | 496 | — |
| 1880 | 460 | −7.3% |
| 1890 | 378 | −17.8% |
| 1900 | 316 | −16.4% |
| 1910 | 472 | +49.4% |

| Year | Pop. | ±% |
|---|---|---|
| 1921 | 431 | −8.7% |
| 1930 | 491 | +13.9% |
| 1950 | 472 | −3.9% |
| 1961 | 563 | +19.3% |
| 1970 | 558 | −0.9% |

| Year | Pop. | ±% |
|---|---|---|
| 1980 | 559 | +0.2% |
| 1991 | 450 | −19.5% |
| 2001 | 490 | +8.9% |
| 2011 | 498 | +1.6% |
| 2021 | 655 | +31.5% |

Source: Censuses

== Transport ==
The D48 motorway (part of the European route E462) runs through the municipality.

== Sights ==
The only protected cultural monument in Horní Tošanovice is the former manor house, built in the Neoclassical style in the first half of the 19th century.
