= Melč =

- Municipality
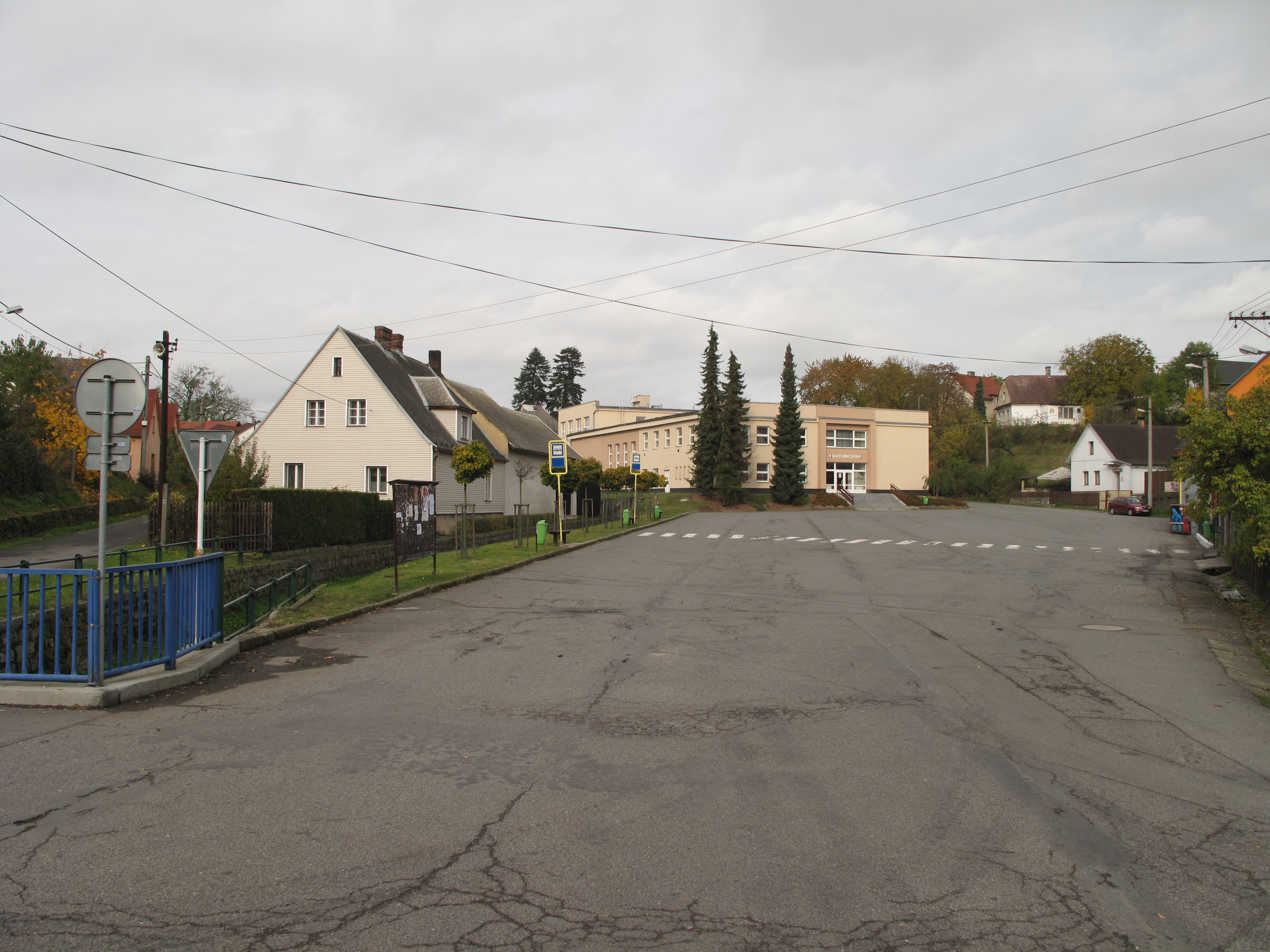
- Centre of Melč

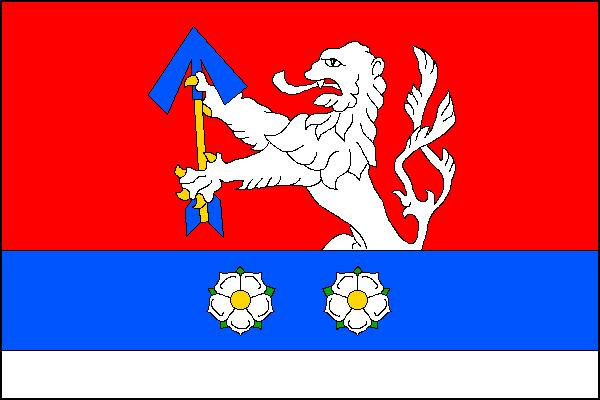
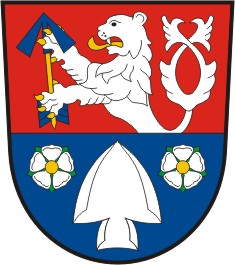
- Flag Coat of arms

- Location in the Czech Republic
- Coordinates: 49°51′0″N 17°45′28″E
- Country: Czech Republic
- Region: Moravian-Silesian
- District: Opava
- First mentioned: 1377

Area
  - Total: 14.02 km^{2} (5.41 sq mi)
- Elevation: 471 m (1,545 ft)

Population (2026-01-01)
  - Total: 652
  - Density: 46.5/km^{2} (120/sq mi)
- Time zone: UTC+1 (CET)
  - Summer (DST): UTC+2 (CEST)
- Postal code: 747 84
- Website: www.obecmelc.cz

Melč (German: Meltsch) is a municipality and village in Opava District in the Moravian-Silesian Region of the Czech Republic. It has about 700 inhabitants.

== History ==
The first written mention of Melč is from 1377.

== Demographics ==
Historical population
Year	Pop.	±%
1869	1,035	—
1880	1,104	+6.7%
1890	1,020	−7.6%
1900	997	−2.3%
1910	909	−8.8%
1921	845	−7.0%
1930	889	+5.2%
1950	643	−27.7%
1961	774	+20.4%
1970	762	−1.6%
1980	680	−10.8%
1991	645	−5.1%
2001	618	−4.2%
2011	648	+4.9%
2021	652	+0.6%
Source: Censuses

== Notable people ==
- William Markowitz (1907–1998), American astronomer

== Gallery ==
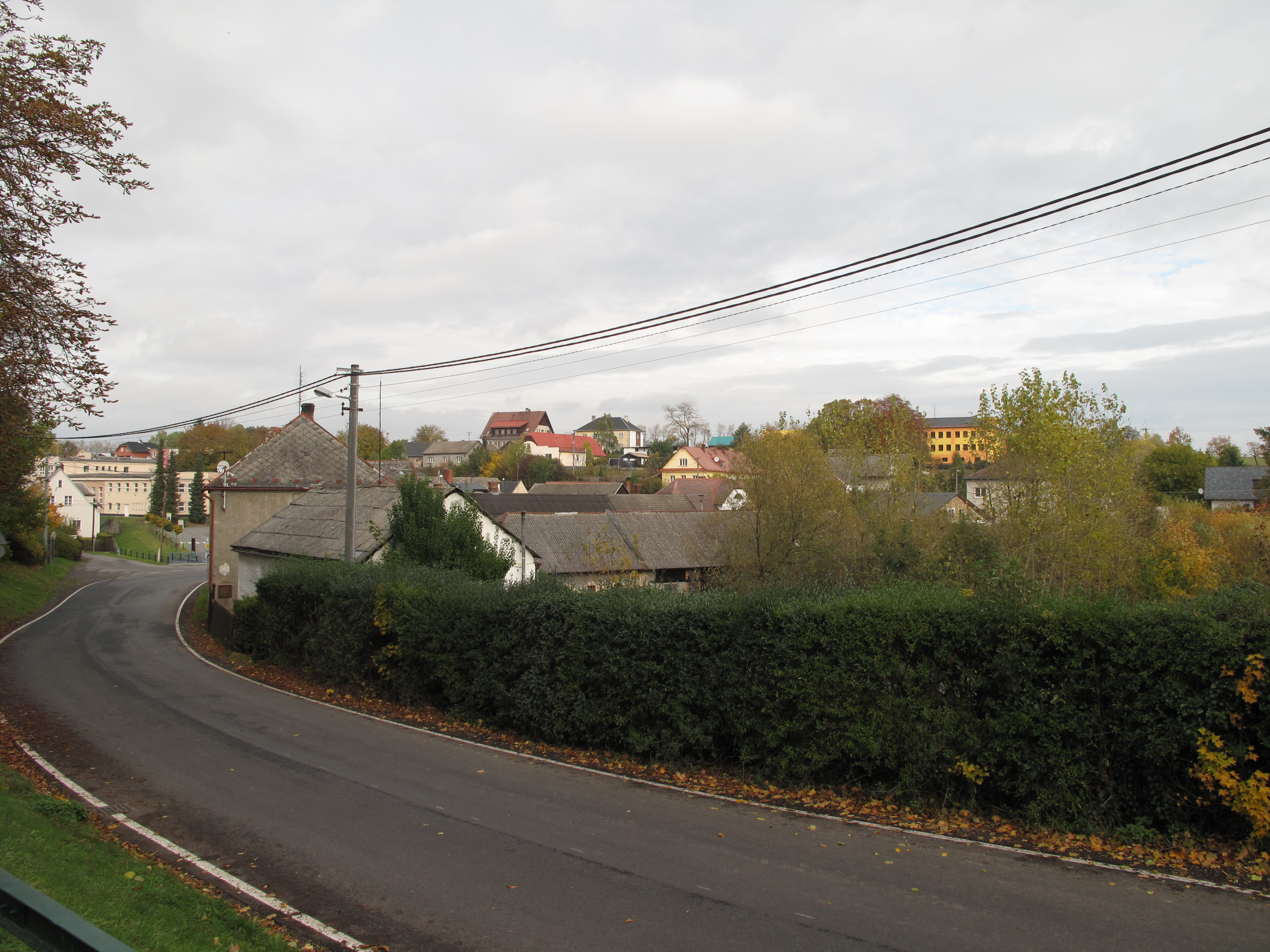
General view

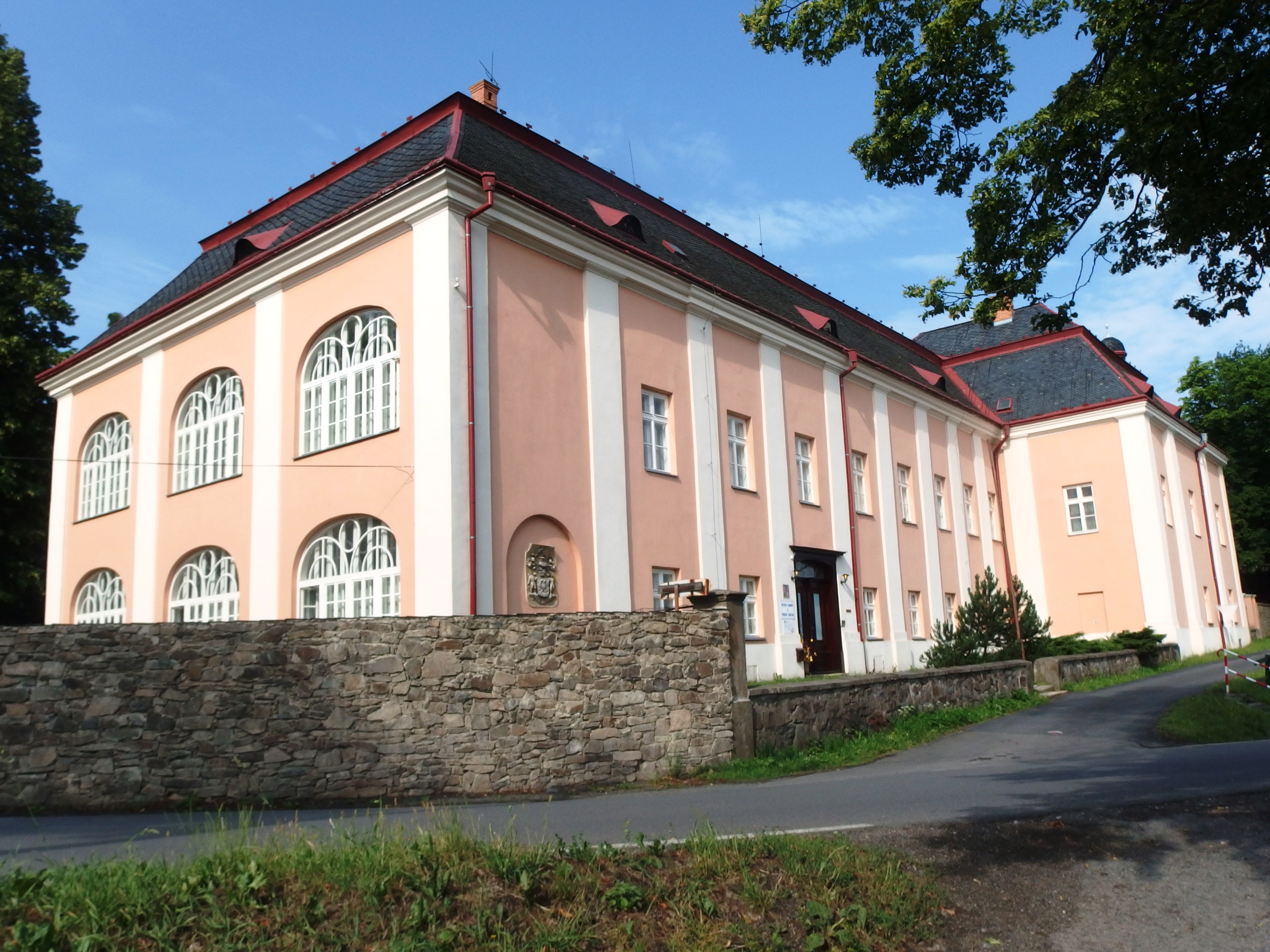
Melč Castle, now a children's home

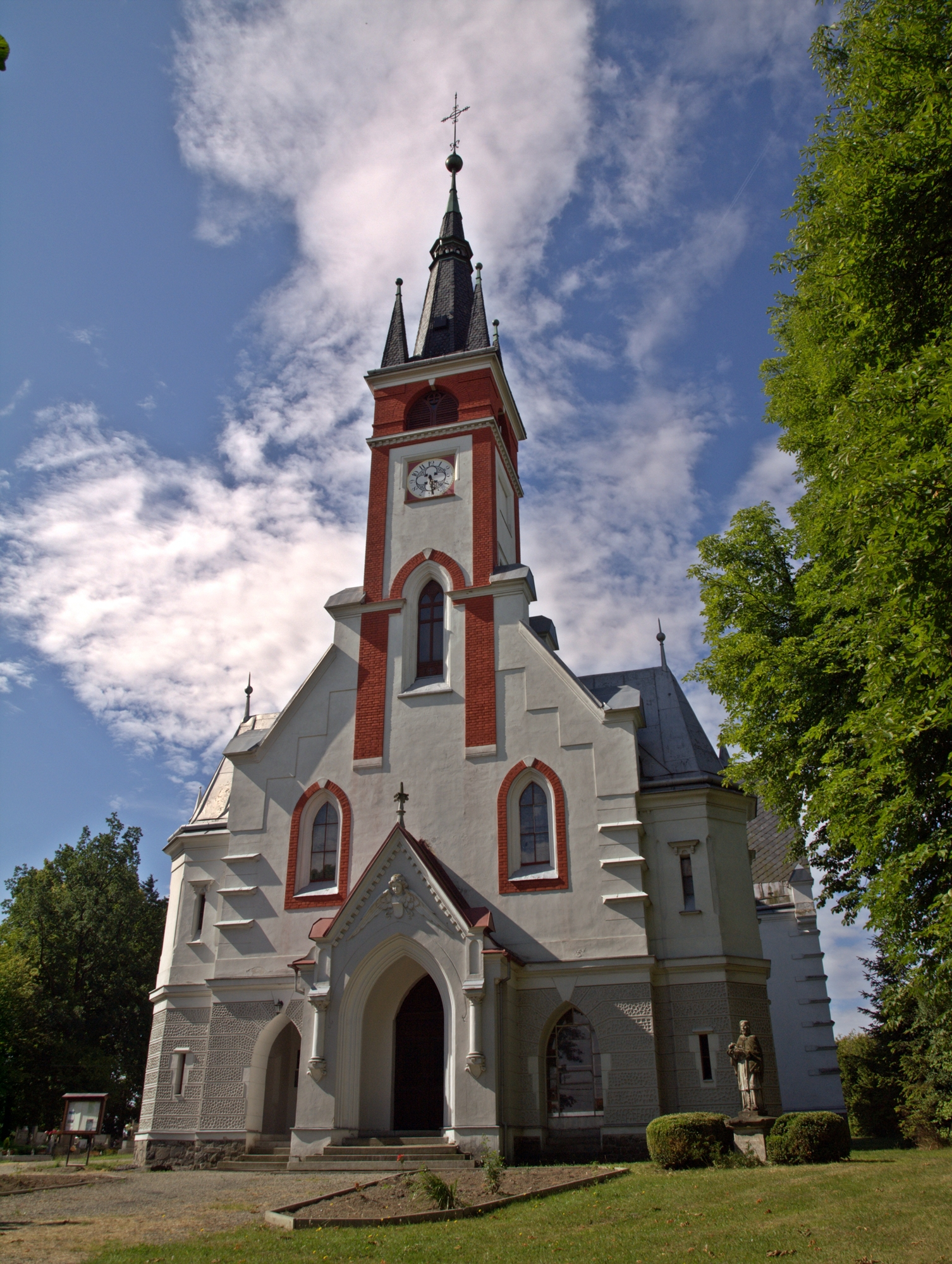
Church of Saint Anthony of Padua
