= Štáblovice =

- Municipality
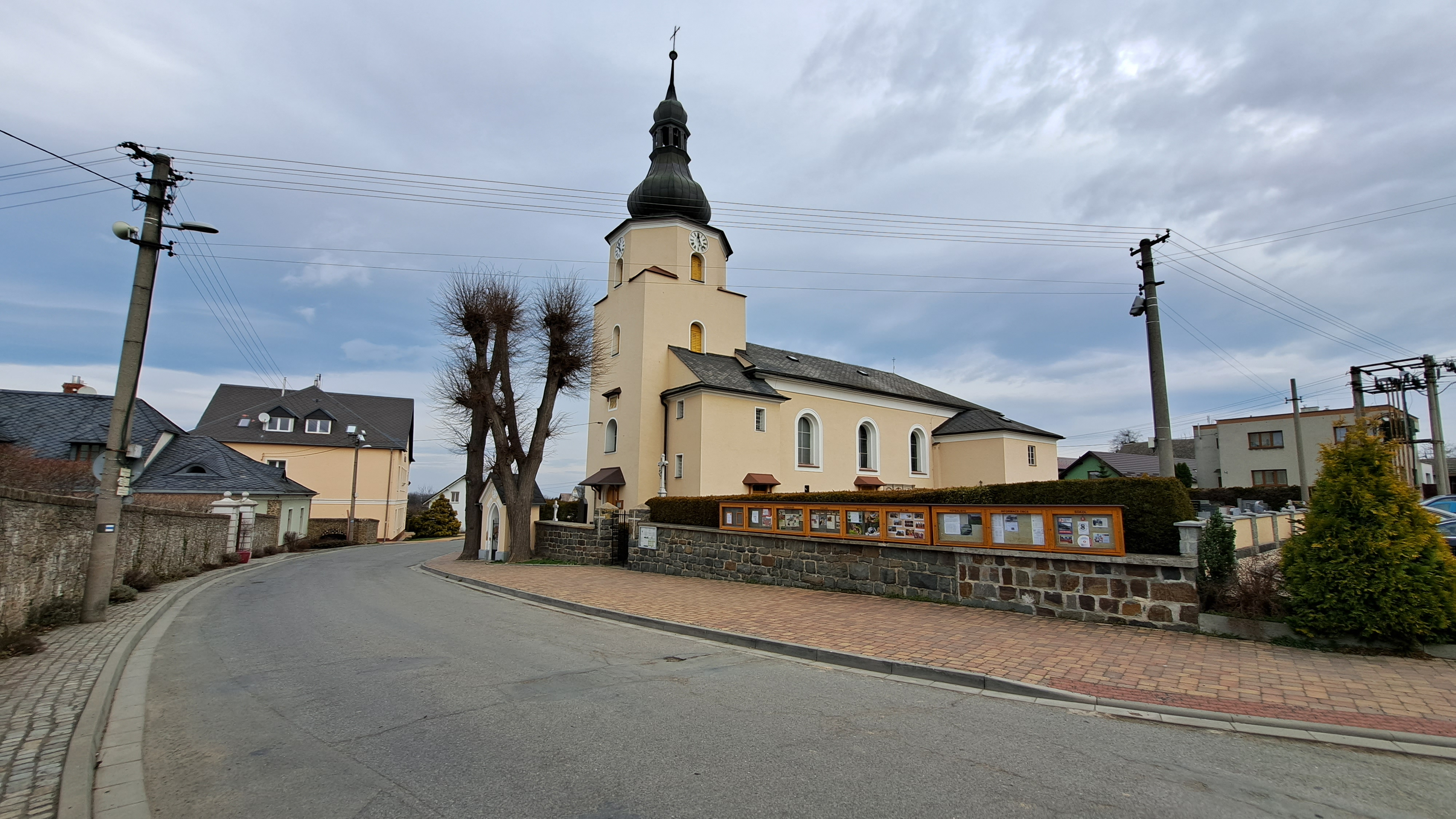
- Church of Saint Lawrence

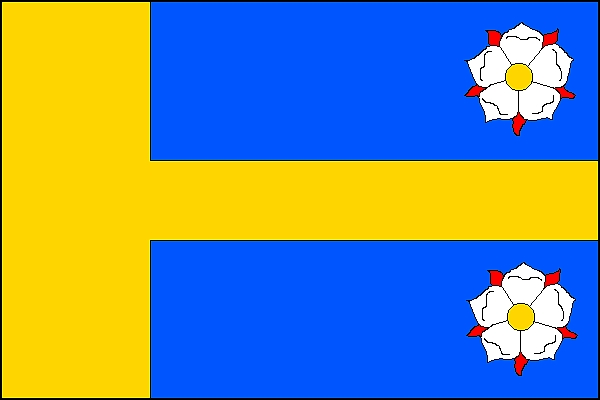
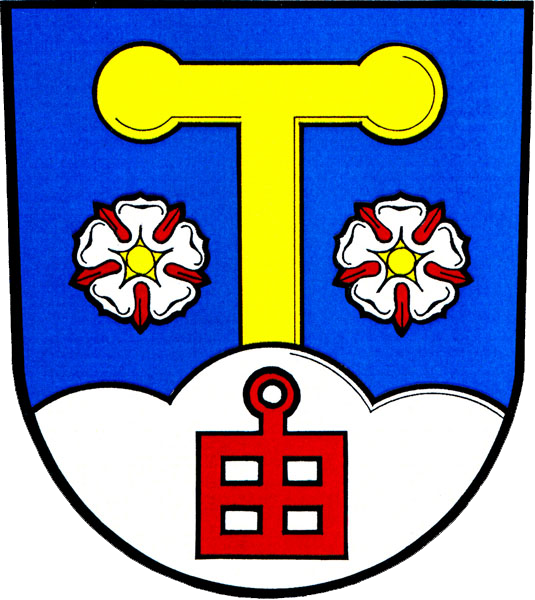
- Flag Coat of arms

- Location in the Czech Republic
- Coordinates: 49°52′48″N 17°49′7″E
- Country: Czech Republic
- Region: Moravian-Silesian
- District: Opava
- First mentioned: 1389

Area
  - Total: 10.37 km^{2} (4.00 sq mi)
- Elevation: 320 m (1,050 ft)

Population (2026-01-01)
  - Total: 712
  - Density: 68.7/km^{2} (178/sq mi)
- Time zone: UTC+1 (CET)
  - Summer (DST): UTC+2 (CEST)
- Postal code: 747 82
- Website: www.obecstablovice.cz

Štáblovice (German: Stablowitz) is a municipality and village in Opava District in the Moravian-Silesian Region of the Czech Republic. It has about 700 inhabitants.

== Administrative division ==
Štáblovice consists of two municipal parts (in brackets population according to the 2021 census):

- Štáblovice (607)
- Lipina (33)

== Geography ==
Štáblovice is located about 8 kilometres (5 mi) southwest of Opava and 30 km (19 mi) west of Ostrava. It lies in the Nízký Jeseník range. The highest point is at 478 m (1,568 ft) above sea level. The Hvozdnice River flows along the northern municipal border.

== History ==
The first written mention of Štáblovice is from 1389. The village was founded between 1245 and 1281.

Lipina was founded in 1783 on the site of a former village, which was first documented here in 1377.

== Demographics ==
Historical population

Year	Pop.	±%
1869	719	—
1880	767	+6.7%
1890	775	+1.0%
1900	741	−4.4%
1910	759	+2.4%

Year	Pop.	±%
1921	666	−12.3%
1930	707	+6.2%
1950	555	−21.5%
1961	650	+17.1%
1970	562	−13.5%

Year	Pop.	±%
1980	566	+0.7%
1991	567	+0.2%
2001	594	+4.8%
2011	606	+2.0%
2021	640	+5.6%

Source: Censuses

== Transport ==
Štáblovice is located on the railway line Opava–Svobodné Heřmanice, but trains run on it only on weekends and holidays during the summer season.

== Sights ==
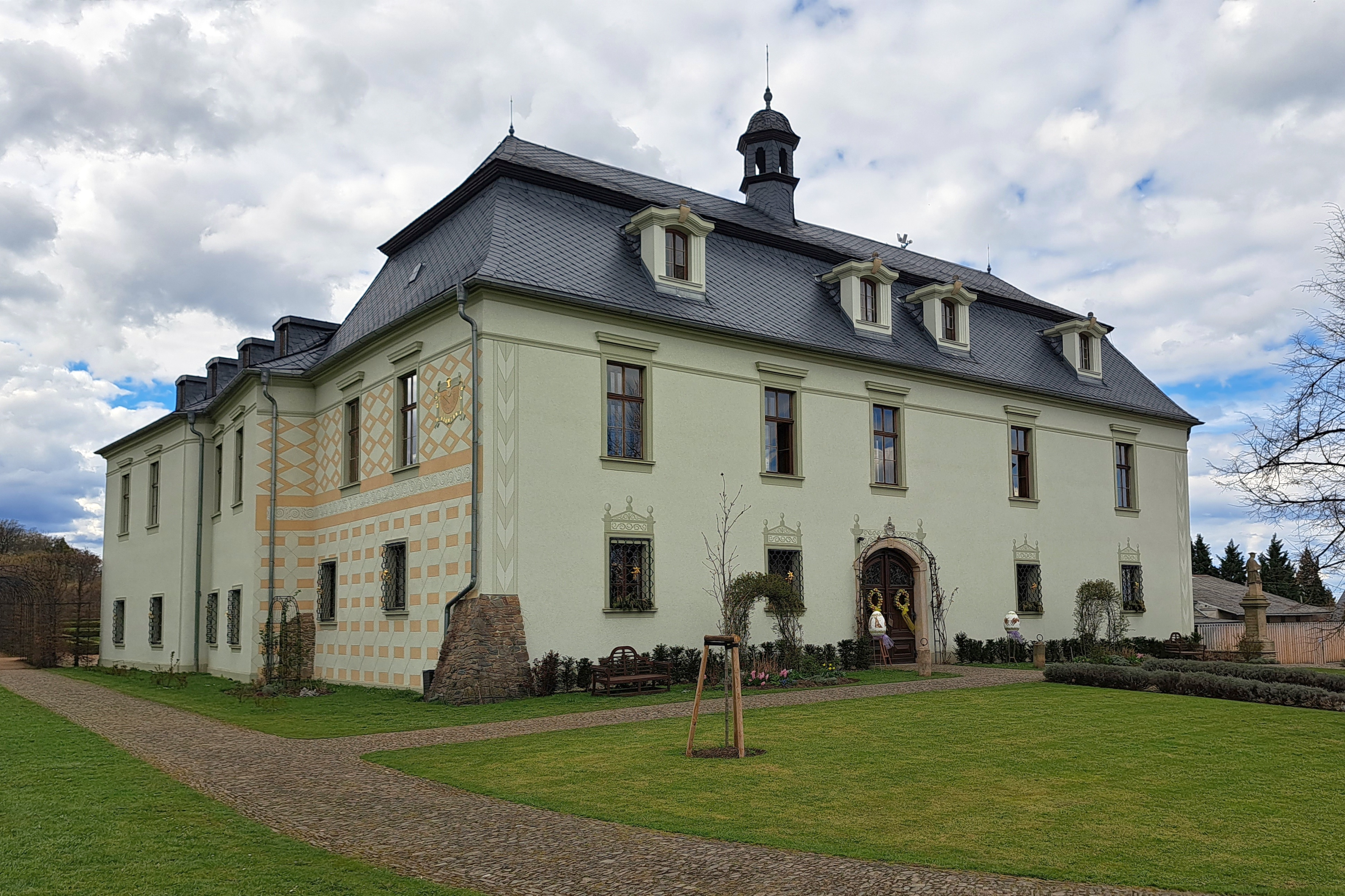
Štáblovice Castle

The main landmark is the Štáblovice Castle. A fortress in Štáblovice was first mentioned in 1528. It was rebuilt in the Renaissance style in the second half of the 16th century and then baroque rebuilt in the second half of the 17th century. Today it is privately owned.

The Church of Saint Lawrence was built in 1603. The church building was replaced by a new one in 1854–1855, only the tower has been preserved.

The village of Lipina has well preserved folk architecture and is protected as a village monument reservation. It consists of brick houses and farm buildings from the end of the 18th century and from the 19th century. The chapel in the centre of the village dates from 1867.
