= Ostrava metropolitan area =

Ostrava metropolitan area Ostravská metropolitní oblast
- Urban area
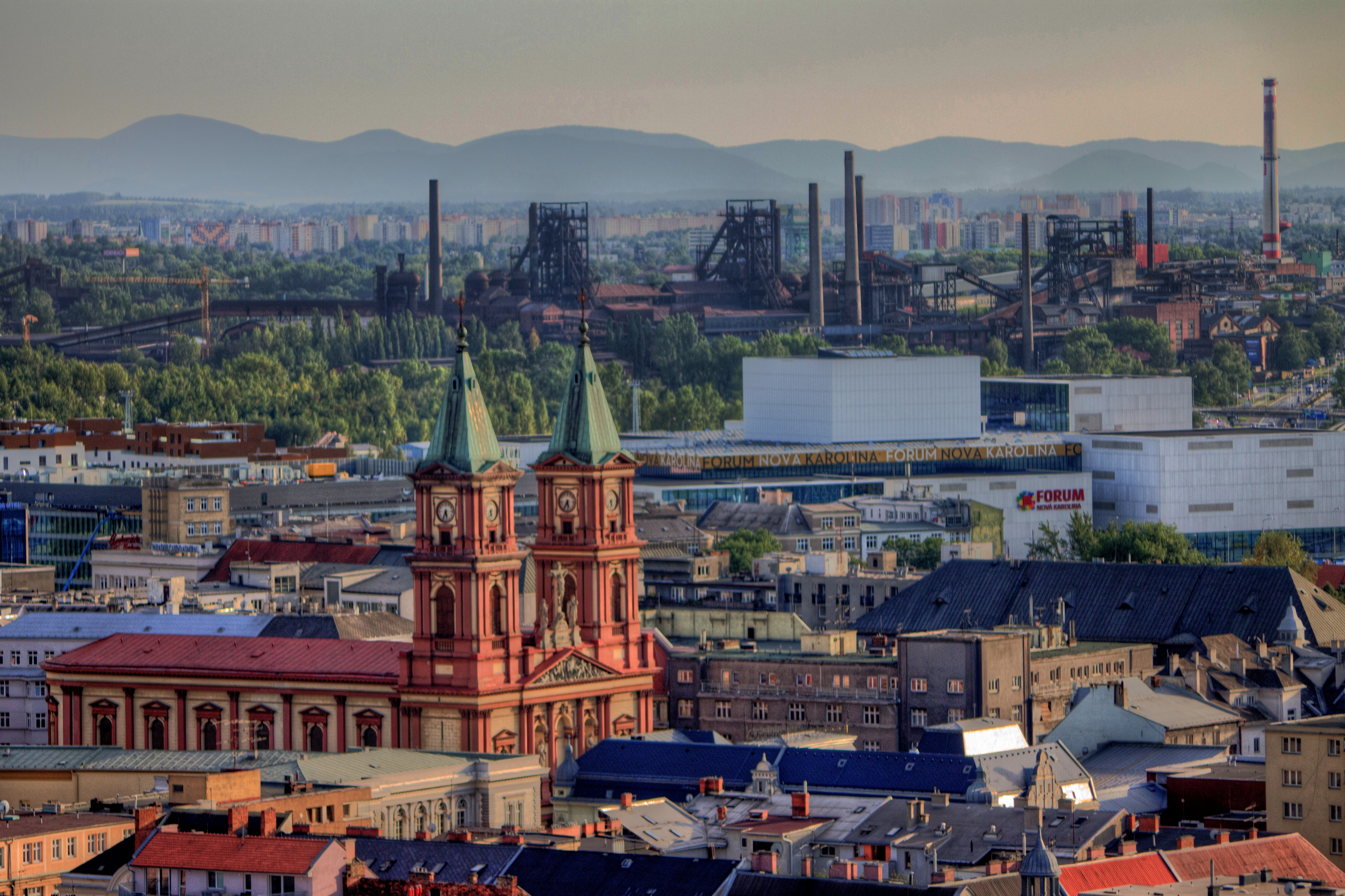
- Skyline of Ostrava

- Ostrava metropolitan area, outlined in red
- Coordinates: 49°50′N 18°17′E
- Country: Czechia
- Region: Moravia-Silesia
- Largest city: Ostrava

Area
  - Metro: 2,710 km^{2} (1,050 sq mi)

Population (2024)
  - Metro: 970,189
  - Metro density: 358/km^{2} (927/sq mi)

GDP
  - Metro: €24.329 billion (2022)
- Time zone: UTC+1 (CET)
- Website: itiostravsko.cz

The Ostrava metropolitan area (Czech: Ostravská metropolitní oblast) is the metropolitan area with the city of Ostrava in the Czech Republic at its center. The Ostrava urban area is the largest urban area in the metropolitan area with a population of 365,000. The metropolitan area has over 81% of the population of the Moravian-Silesian Region. The population of the metropolitan area is 970,189 as of 2024. An alternative definition, the Eurostat Larger Urban Zone, lists a population of 1,153,876. The Ostrava metropolitan area is sometimes combined with the Katowice metropolitan area to form a wider metropolitan area with a population of 5,008,000 (2015). The metropolitan area has 172 municipalities.

Historical population
Year	Pop.	±%
1950	685,680	—
1961	826,049	+20.5%
1970	960,213	+16.2%
1980	1,032,465	+7.5%
1991	1,049,794	+1.7%
2001	1,034,314	−1.5%
2011	985,696	−4.7%
2021	949,291	−3.7%
Source: Censuses

== Municipalities ==
Name	Population (2024)
Albrechtice	3,818
Albrechtičky	688
Baška	4,029
Bělá	668
Bílá	284
Bílov	588
Bílovec	7,401
Bítov	493
Bocanovice	498
Bohumín	20,519
Bohuslavice	1,786
Bolatice	4,501
Branka u Opavy	1,074
Bravantice	1,041
Brumovice	1,531
Brušperk	4,157
Bruzovice	979
Budišovice	788
Býkov-Láryšov	166
Bystřice	5,266
Čavisov	512
Čeladná	2,904
Český Těšín	23,282
Darkovice	1,380
Děhylov	746
Dětmarovice	4,435
Dobrá	3,248
Dobratice	1,399
Dobroslavice	782
Dolní Benešov	3,892
Dolní Domaslavice	1,460
Dolní Lhota	1,518
Dolní Lutyně	5,315
Dolní Tošanovice	396
Dolní Životice	1,049
Doubrava	1,164
Fryčovice	2,395
Frýdek-Místek	53,938
Frýdlant nad Ostravicí	9,923
Háj ve Slezsku	3,245
Hať	2,555
Havířov	69,694
Hlavnice	675
Hlubočec	576
Hlučín	13,421
Hněvošice	1,003
Hnojník	1,501
Holasovice	1,366
Horní Bludovice	2,591
Horní Domaslavice	1,053
Horní Lhota	858
Horní Suchá	4,366
Horní Tošanovice	706
Hrabyně	1,131
Hradec nad Moravicí	5,485
Hrádek	1,920
Hukvaldy	2,175
Chlebičov	1,177
Chotěbuz	1,395
Chuchelná	1,258
Chvalíkovice	696
Jablunkov	5,257
Jakartovice	1,080
Janovice	2,001
Jezdkovice	244
Jistebník	1,721
Kaňovice	363
Karviná	49,724
Kateřinice	691
Klimkovice	4,536
Kobeřice	3,204
Komorní Lhotka	1,498
Košařiska	354
Kozmice	1,921
Krásná	726
Kravaře	6,655
Krmelín	2,353
Krnov	22,716
Kružberk	233
Kyjovice	849
Lhotka	595
Lhotka u Litultovic	225
Litultovice	926
Lučina	1,595
Ludgeřovice	4,980
Malenovice	797
Markvartovice	2,204
Metylovice	1,799
Mikolajice	302
Milíkov	1,312
Mladecko	147
Mokré Lazce	1,165
Moravice	240
Morávka	1,413
Mošnov	758
Návsí	3,852
Neplachovice	1,061
Nižní Lhoty	294
Nošovice	1,013
Nové Lublice	178
Nové Sedlice	500
Nýdek	2,080
Olbramice	725
Oldřišov	1,500
Opava	55,600
Orlová	27,794
Ostrava	284,765
Třinec	34,266
Ostravice	2,529
Otice	1,497
Palkovice	3,518
Paskov	3,913
Pazderna	396
Petrovice u Karviné	4,945
Petřvald (Karviná District)	7,407
Petřvald (Nový Jičín District)	1,741
Písečná	1,067
Píšť	2,085
Pražmo	897
Pržno	1,101
Pstruží	1,075
Pustá Polom	1,349
Raduň	1,184
Raškovice	2,052
Ropice	1,747
Rychvald	7,783
Řeka	551
Řepiště	1,896
Sedliště	1,725
Skřipov	998
Slatina	767
Slavkov	2,126
Služovice	840
Smilovice	857
Soběšovice	956
Stará Ves nad Ondřejnicí	2,974
Staré Město	1,518
Staříč	2,249
Stěbořice	1,452
Stonava	1,758
Střítež	1,074
Studénka	9,309
Sviadnov	2,226
Šenov	6,585
Šilheřovice	1,592
Štáblovice	720
Štěpánkovice	3,169
Štítina	1,292
Těrlicko	4,841
Těškovice	815
Tísek	985
Trnávka	752
Třanovice	1,083
Uhlířov	404
Úvalno	982
Václavovice	2,115
Velká Polom	2,146
Velké Albrechtice	1,176
Velké Heraltice	1,611
Velké Hoštice	1,830
Vělopolí	295
Vendryně	4,486
Vojkovice	784
Vratimov	7,360
Vršovice	523
Vřesina (Opava District)	1,694
Vřesina (Ostrava-City District)	2,831
Vyšní Lhoty	884
Závada	623
Zbyslavice	661
Žabeň	960
Žermanice	356
Total	970,189
