= Vřesina =

Vřesina may refer to places in the Czech Republic:

- Vřesina (Opava District), a municipality and village in the Moravian-Silesian Region
- Vřesina (Ostrava-City District), a municipality and village in the Moravian-Silesian Region
