= Václavovice =

- Municipality
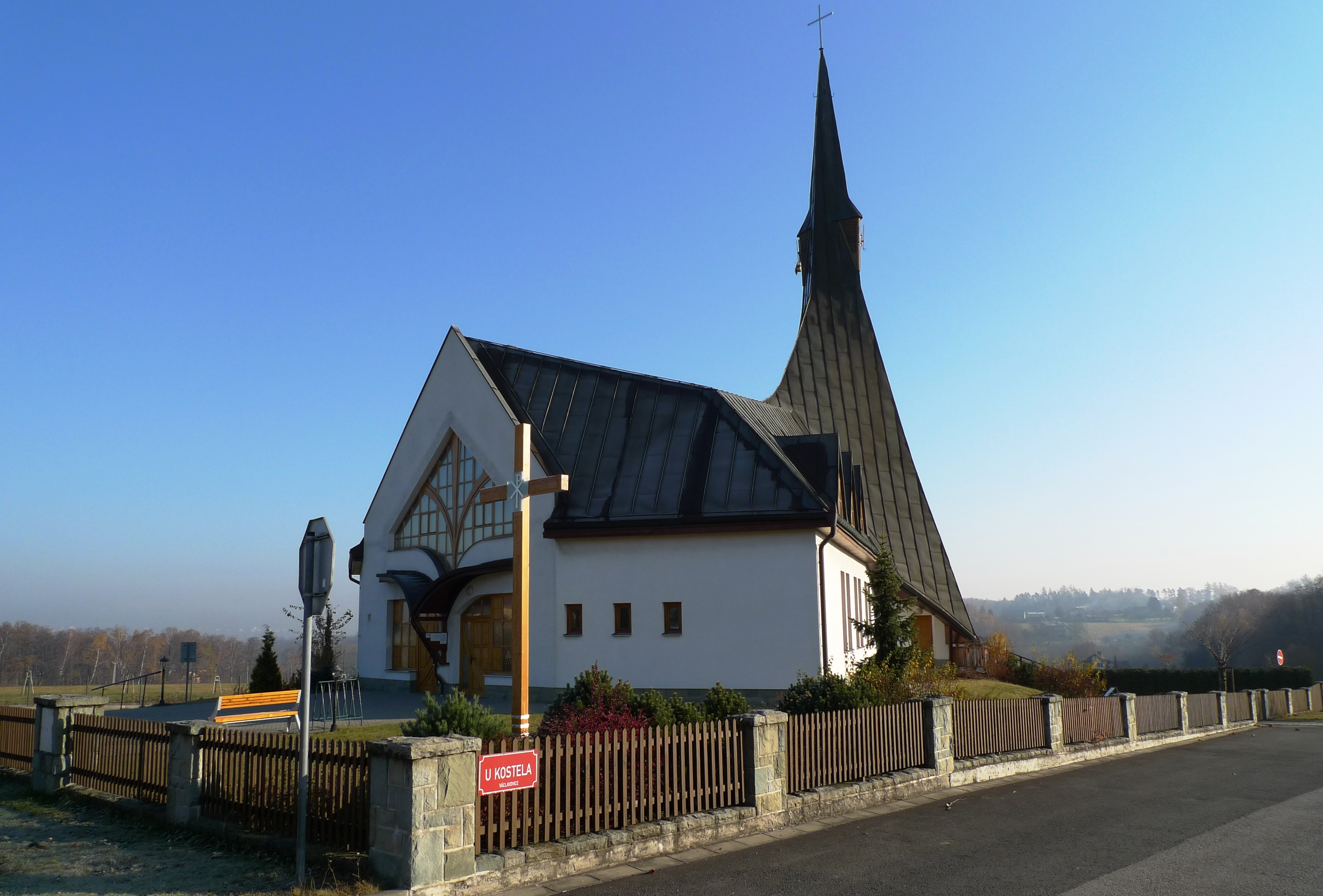
- Church of Saint Wenceslaus

- Flag Coat of arms

- Location in the Czech Republic
- Coordinates: 49°45′19″N 18°22′20″E
- Country: Czech Republic
- Region: Moravian-Silesian
- District: Ostrava-City
- First mentioned: 1305

Area
  - Total: 5.68 km^{2} (2.19 sq mi)
- Elevation: 304 m (997 ft)

Population (2026-01-01)
  - Total: 2,125
  - Density: 374/km^{2} (969/sq mi)
- Time zone: UTC+1 (CET)
  - Summer (DST): UTC+2 (CEST)
- Postal code: 739 34
- Website: www.obecvaclavovice.cz

Václavovice (German: Wenzlowitz, Polish: Więcłowice) is a municipality and village in Ostrava-City District in the Moravian-Silesian Region of the Czech Republic. It has about 2,100 inhabitants.

== Geography ==
Václavovice is located about 7 kilometres (4 mi) southeast of Ostrava, in the historical region of Cieszyn Silesia. It is urbanistically fused with the town of Vratimov. It lies in the Ostrava Basin.

== History ==
Václavovice was founded during the colonisation of Cieszyn Silesia in the late the 13th century. The first written mention is from 1302 under its Latin name Wenceslaowitz.

Politically the village belonged initially to the Duchy of Teschen, formed in 1290 in the process of feudal fragmentation of Poland and was ruled by a local branch of Piast dynasty. In 1327 the duchy became a fee of Kingdom of Bohemia, which after 1526 became part of the Habsburg monarchy.

== Demographics ==
Historical population

Year	Pop.	±%
1869	966	—
1880	1,052	+8.9%
1890	1,128	+7.2%
1900	1,223	+8.4%
1910	1,250	+2.2%

Year	Pop.	±%
1921	1,253	+0.2%
1930	1,353	+8.0%
1950	1,297	−4.1%
1961	1,429	+10.2%
1970	1,399	−2.1%

Year	Pop.	±%
1980	1,422	+1.6%
1991	1,475	+3.7%
2001	1,492	+1.2%
2011	1,860	+24.7%
2021	2,026	+8.9%

Source: Censuses

== Transport ==
There are no railways or major roads passing through the municipality.

== Sights ==
The main landmark of Václavovice is the Church of Saint Wenceslaus. It is a modern church, which was built in 1998–2001.
