= Philipp Gschwandtner =

Austrian Grass skiing competitor

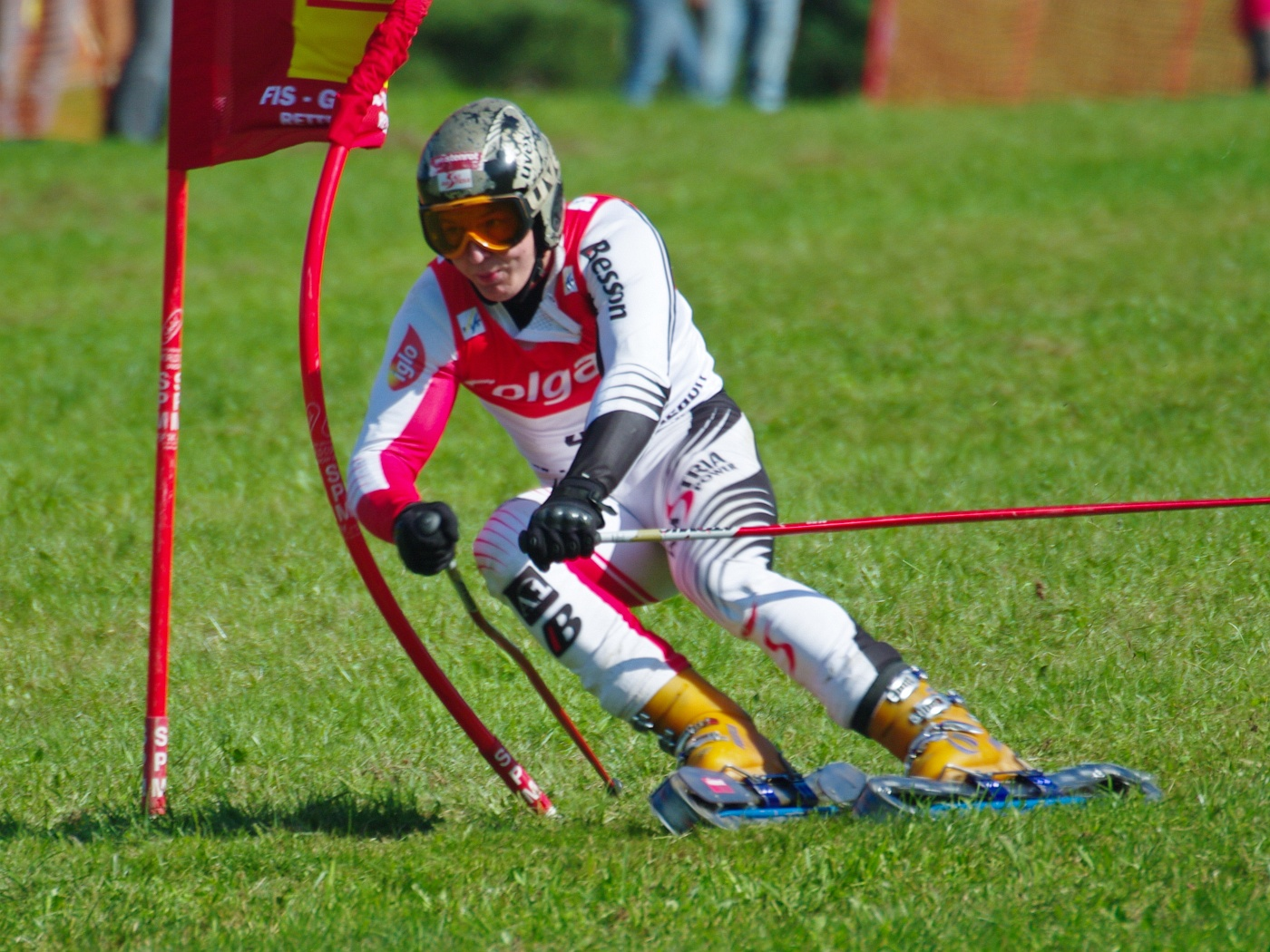

Personal information
- Born: 12 August 1989 (age 36)

Sport
- Country: Austria
- Sport: Grass skiing
- Club: Bad Tatzmannsdorf
- Team: Austria
- Retired: 2011

Achievements and titles
- Highest world ranking: Grass-Junior World Cup 2009: 1 Giant Slalom

Philipp Gschwandtner (born 12 August 1989) is a retired Austrian Grass skiing competitor. He began his career with the ski club in Bad Tatzmannsdorf and was a member of the Austrian Ski Federation's A-team. In 2009, he became the World Junior Champion in giant slalom. His brother, Daniel, is also an alpine skier.

== Career ==
Philipp Gschwandtner played his first international race in July 2004 at the World Junior Championships in his hometown of Rettenbach. He finished 16th place in the slalom and in combination, and ranked 24th in the giant slalom and 38th in the super-G. After three FIS races, he started in late August for the first time in the World Cup, but still could not win World Cup points. In the 2005 season, he played exclusively in FIS races in which he, on 2 July, in the slalom events in Marbachegg was the first among the top ten, and the World Junior Championships in Nové Mesto na Moravě, where he worked in all competitions under the fastest 30 and went as the best result achieved rank 21 in the combination.

In the World Junior Championships 2006, he came in the 22nd Rank in the super-G. In August and September of that year, he again took part in several World Cup races and received for the first time points. His best finish was 17th place in the slalom in saddle on 26 August; in Grass Skiing World Cup 2006 Season 2006 he ranked 31st in the standings. In the 2007 season Gschwandtner reached on August 26 with number ten in the second slalom of saddle his best World Cup result, the day before, he had already occupied the twelfth. Still, he could improve in the standings from the previous year only slightly and he was ranked 28th. In the World Junior Championships 2007, he went to ninth in the giant slalom and in the twelfth ranked 15th in super combined. In the following season, Gschwandtner, in his FIS races, repeatedly ranked among the Top Ten in the World Cup, but only two go into the top 20, which he finished in 27th place overall. He achieved good results at the World Junior Championships 2008 in Rieden, Switzerland In the super-G, he went to coincide with the Czechs Lukáš Kolouch at number six and in the super-combined in seventh place. In the slalom, he coincided with his brother in eighth place in the giant slalom and in eleventh.

In the 2009 season, the Burgenland native, in the World Cup could increase his performance significantly. He came six times in the top 16, which placed him in the final on the 13th improved space. He enjoyed great success at the World Youth Championship 2009 in the Czech Republic Horní Lhota u Ostravy by winning the gold medal in giant slalom and the bronze medal in the super-G. In the slalom, he finished in sixth place; however, he did not finish the super-combination. In September 2009, Gschwandtner was for the first time part of the general class at the World Cup. In his hometown Rettenbach, he was number 16 in the Super-G, number 19 in the giant slalom and 32nd in the super combined. In the slalom, he left in the first round. In the 2010 season, he started only in the FIS race in Rettenbach, at the same time as the Austrian Championships included. This was his only result of the tenth place in the Super-G, which earned him the bronze medal in the Austrian Championships.

=== Junior World Championships ===
- Rettenbach 2004: 16 Slalom, 16 Combination, 24 Giant Slalom, 38 Super-G
- Nové Mesto na Moravě 2005: 21 Combination, 25 Slalom, 26 Giant Slalom, 30 Super-G
- Horní Lhota 2006: 22 Super-G
- Nova Levante, 2007: 9 Slalom, 12 Giant Slalom, 15 Super Combined
- Rieden 2008: 6 Super-G, 7 Super Combined, 8th Slalom, 11 Giant Slalom
- Horní Lhota 2009: 1 Giant Slalom, 3rd Super-G, 6 Slalom

=== Championships ===
- Rettenbach 2009: 16 Super-G, 19 Giant Slalom, 32 Super Combined

=== World Cup ===
- A rank in the top ten, ten times more best among the 20.

== Retirement ==
As of 2011, Gschwandtner is retired from professional Grass Skiing and now competes as an amateur bodybuilder.
