= Ostrava-City District =

Ostrava-City District Okres Ostrava-město
- District
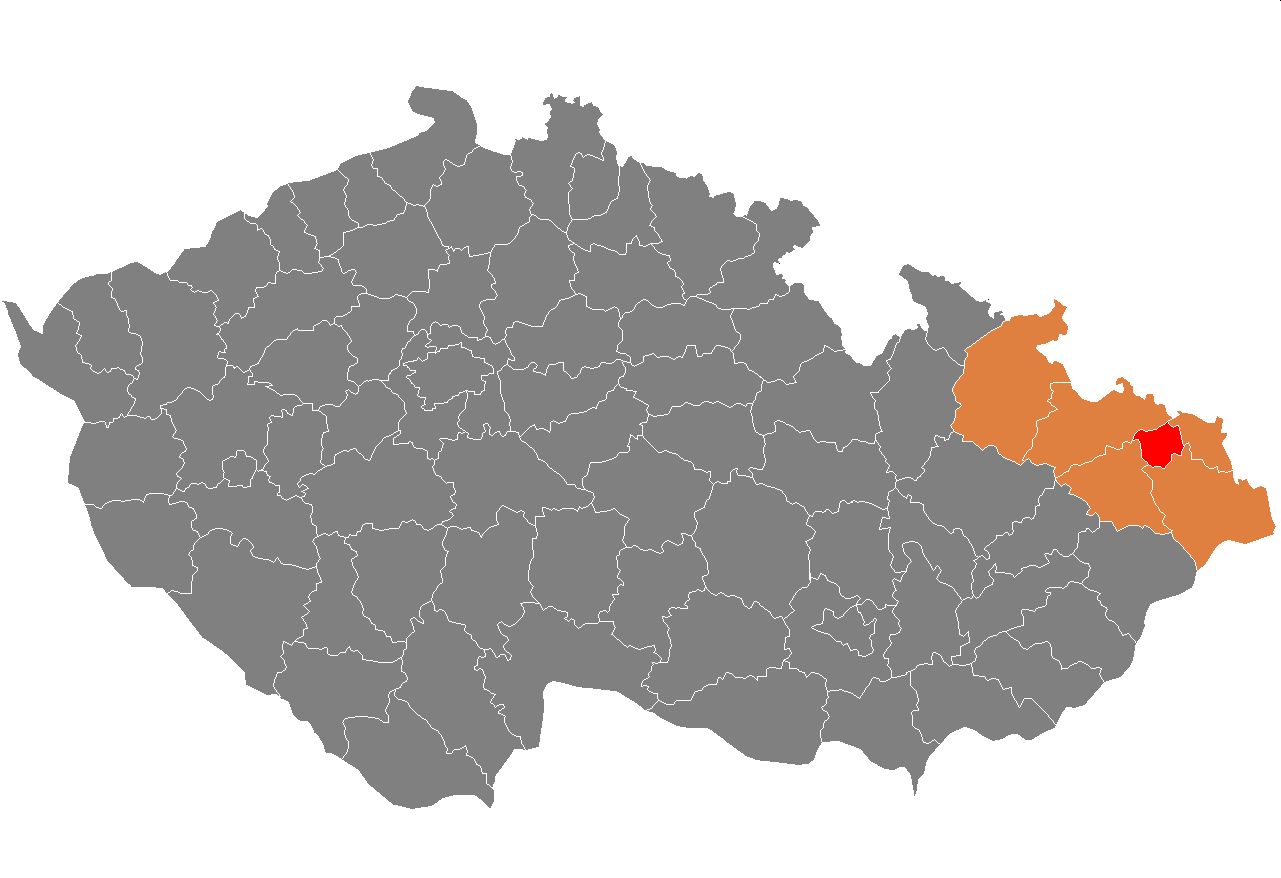
- Location in the Moravian-Silesian Region within the Czech Republic
- Coordinates: 49°39′N 18°1′E
- Country: Czech Republic
- Region: Moravian-Silesian
- Capital: Ostrava

Area
  - Total: 331.53 km^{2} (128.00 sq mi)

Population (2026)
  - Total: 313,804
  - Density: 946.53/km^{2} (2,451.5/sq mi)
- Time zone: UTC+1 (CET)
  - Summer (DST): UTC+2 (CEST)
- Municipalities: 13
- * Cities and towns: 4
- * Market towns: 0

Ostrava-City District (Czech: okres Ostrava-město) is a district in the Moravian-Silesian Region of the Czech Republic. Its capital is the city of Ostrava.

== Administrative division ==
Ostrava-City District is formed by only one administrative district of municipality with extended competence: Ostrava.

=== List of municipalities ===
Cities and towns are marked in bold:

Čavisov – Dolní Lhota – Horní Lhota – Klimkovice – Olbramice – Ostrava – Šenov – Stará Ves nad Ondřejnicí – Václavovice – Velká Polom – Vratimov – Vřesina – Zbyslavice

== Geography ==
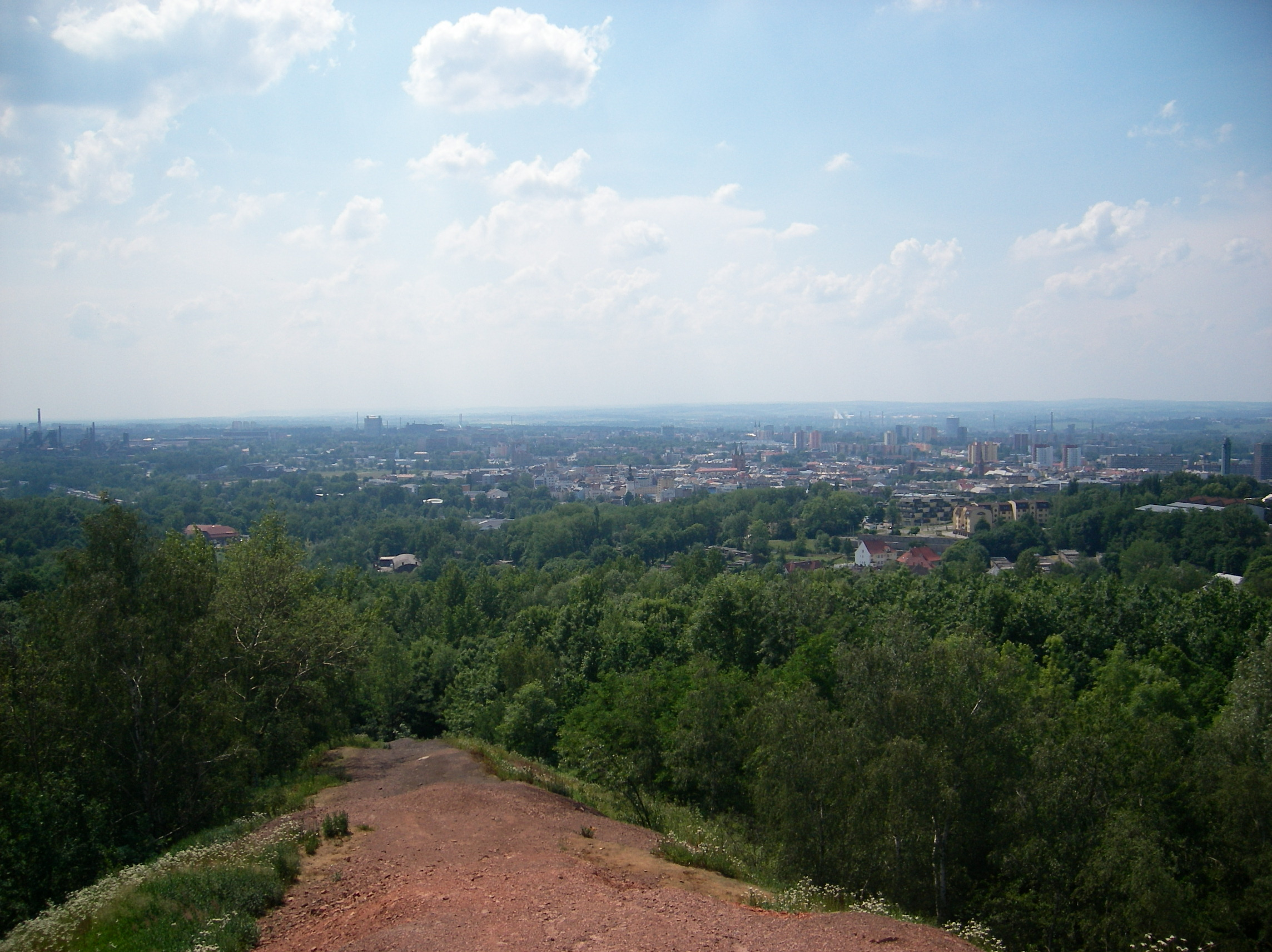
Ostrava and surrounding landscape

The terrain is mostly flat and in the west slightly undulating, without significant hills. The territory extends into four geomorphological mesoregions: Ostrava Basin (east and centre), Nízký Jeseník (west), Moravian Gate (southwest), and Opava Hilly Land (negligible part in the north). The highest point of the district is the hill Úhorky in Horní Lhota with an elevation of 404 m (1,325 ft). The lowest point of the district is the river bed of the Oder in Ostrava-Antošovice at 199 m (653 ft).

From the total district area of 331.5 km^{2} (128.0 sq mi), agricultural land occupies 152.8 km^{2} (59.0 sq mi), forests occupy 54.0 km^{2} (20.8 sq mi), and water area occupies 11.7 km^{2} (4.5 sq mi). Forests cover 16.3% of the district's area.

The most important river of the district is the Oder, which flows across the territory from south to north. The Opava River flows into the Oder from the west. The largest body of water is Heřmanický Pond with an area of 116 ha (290 acres).

A part of the territory along the Oder River is protected as the Poodří Protected Landscape Area.

== Demographics ==
Historical population

Year	Pop.	±%
1869	50,339	—
1880	69,123	+37.3%
1890	98,914	+43.1%
1900	160,994	+62.8%
1910	204,274	+26.9%

Year	Pop.	±%
1921	216,700	+6.1%
1930	240,949	+11.2%
1950	236,318	−1.9%
1961	279,677	+18.3%
1970	323,033	+15.5%

Year	Pop.	±%
1980	349,371	+8.2%
1991	353,989	+1.3%
2001	343,559	−2.9%
2011	326,018	−5.1%
2021	313,857	−3.7%

Source: Censuses

=== Most populous municipalities ===
Name	Population	Area (km^{2})
Ostrava	280,853	214
Vratimov	7,469	14
Šenov	6,642	17
Klimkovice	4,396	15
Stará Ves nad Ondřejnicí	2,990	19
Vřesina	2,819	9
Velká Polom	2,217	12

== Economy ==
Ostrava is the economic centre of the entire Moravian-Silesian Region. All the largest employers with headquarters in Ostrava-City District and at least 1,000 employees have their seat in Ostrava. The largest employers with headquarters in Ostrava and at least 1,500 employees are:

Economic entity	Number of employees	Main activity
Regional Police Directorate of the Moravian-Silesian Region	5,000–9,999	Public order and safety activities
Faculty Hospital Ostrava	5,000–9,999	Health care
City of Ostrava	3,000–3,999	Public administration
DHL Solutions	3,000–3,999	Warehousing and storage
Hruška	3,000–3,999	Retail sale
City Hospital Ostrava	2,500–2,999	Health care
Liberty Ostrava	2,500–2,999	Manufacture of iron and steel
University of Ostrava	2,500–2,999	Education
VSB – Technical University of Ostrava	2,500–2,999	Education
Dopravní podnik Ostrava	2,000–2,499	Public transport
Česká distribuční	1,500–1,999	Advertising
Tietoevry Tech Services Czechia	1,500–1,999	Computer programming and consultancy

The largest company based in the district, but outside Ostrava, is KES – kabelové a elektrické systémy in Vratimov. It is a manufacturer of electrical equipment for motor vehicles with 500–999 employees.

== Transport ==
The D1 motorway from Brno to the Czech-Polish passes through the district. The second important road is the D56 motorway, which connects Ostrava with Frýdek-Místek.

== Sights ==
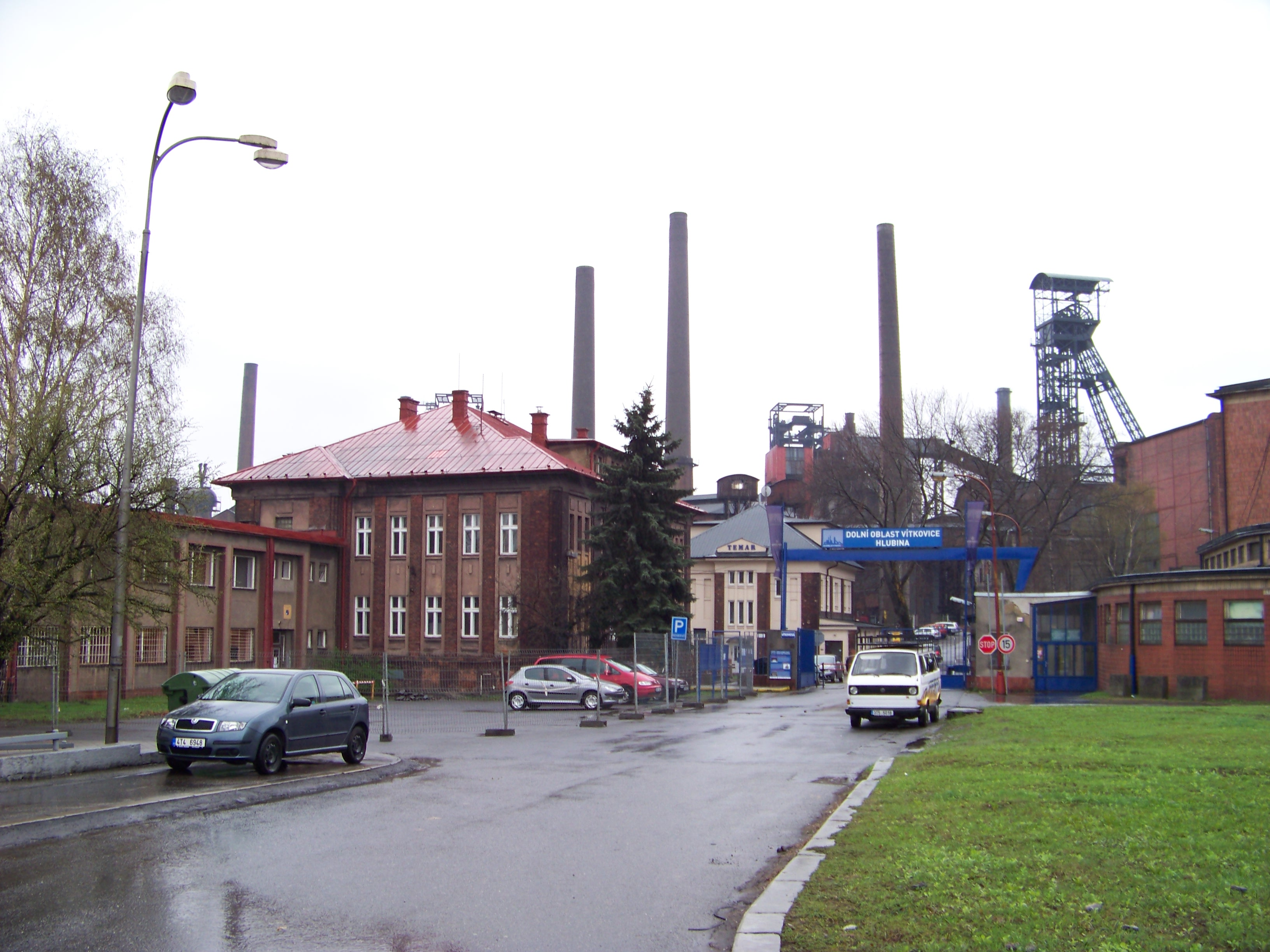
Hlubina Mine

The most important monuments in the district, protected as national cultural monuments (all of them located in Ostrava), are:

- Red Army Monument
- Michal Mine
- Hlubina Mine and Vítkovické železárny's high furnace and coke oven
- Liska's villa
- New City Hall

The best-preserved settlements, protected as monument zones, are:

- Ostrava-Moravská Ostrava
- Ostrava-Poruba
- Ostrava-Přívoz
- Ostrava-Vítkovice

Four of the ten most visited tourist destinations of the Moravian-Silesian Region are located in Ostrava. The most visited tourist destinations are Lower Vítkovice, Ostrava Zoo, Silesian Ostrava Castle, Landek Park Ostrava mining museum, and Centrum Černá Louka exhibition grounds.
