= Vřesina (Ostrava-City District) =

- Municipality
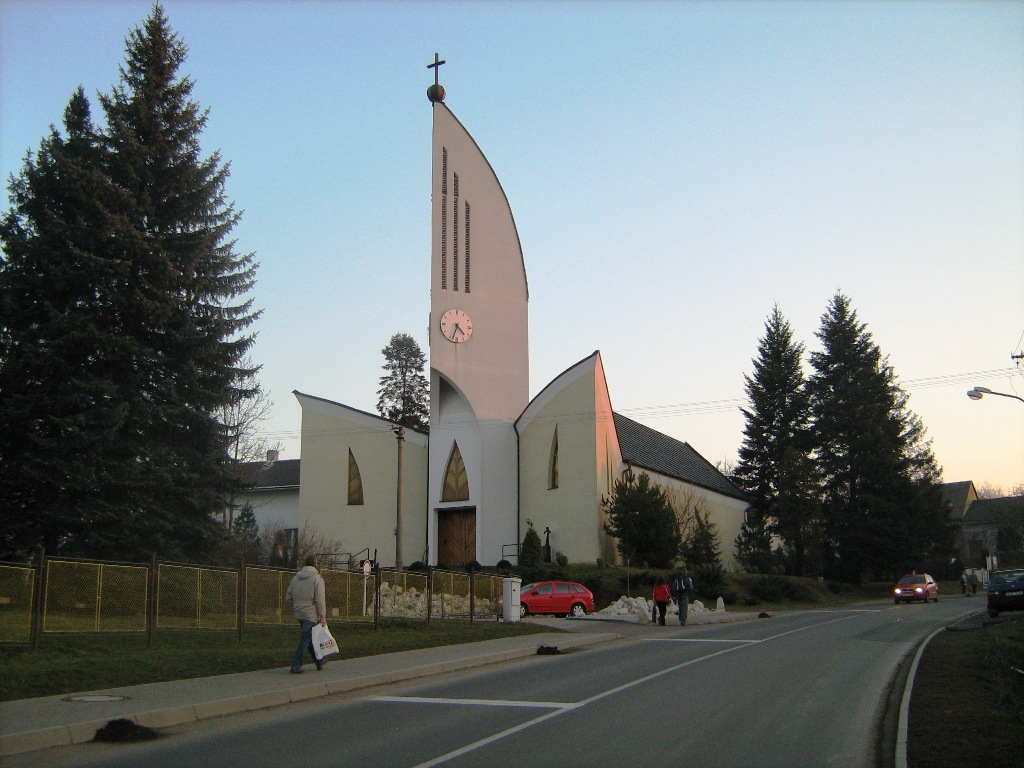
- Church of Saint Anthony of Padua

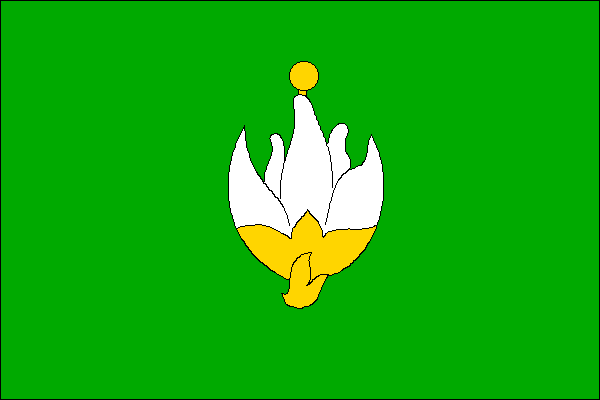
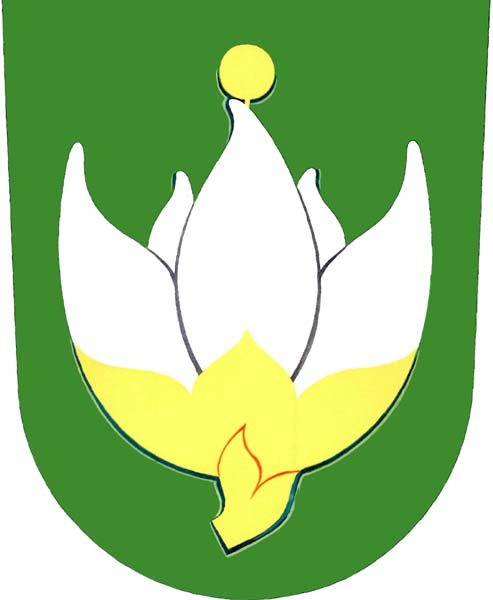
- Flag Coat of arms

- Location in the Czech Republic
- Coordinates: 49°49′26″N 18°7′32″E
- Country: Czech Republic
- Region: Moravian-Silesian
- District: Ostrava-City
- First mentioned: 1377

Area
  - Total: 8.65 km^{2} (3.34 sq mi)
- Elevation: 271 m (889 ft)

Population (2026-01-01)
  - Total: 2,819
  - Density: 326/km^{2} (844/sq mi)
- Time zone: UTC+1 (CET)
  - Summer (DST): UTC+2 (CEST)
- Postal code: 742 85
- Website: www.vresina.cz

Vřesina is a municipality and village in Ostrava-City District in the Moravian-Silesian Region of the Czech Republic. It has about 2,800 inhabitants.

== Geography ==
Vřesina is located about 3 kilometres (2 mi) west of Ostrava. It lies in the Nízký Jeseník range. The highest point is the hill Mezihoří at 383 m (1,257 ft) above sea level.

== History ==
The first written mention of Vřesina is from 1377. The village was probably founded in the second half of the 12th century, when the area was colonised. From 1461 to 1702, Vřesina belonged to the Velká Polom estate. From 1702, it was a part of the Klimkovice estate.

== Demographics ==
Historical population

Year	Pop.	±%
1869	545	—
1880	567	+4.0%
1890	636	+12.2%
1900	715	+12.4%
1910	822	+15.0%

Year	Pop.	±%
1921	826	+0.5%
1930	1,186	+43.6%
1950	1,276	+7.6%
1961	1,682	+31.8%
1970	1,803	+7.2%

Year	Pop.	±%
1980	2,219	+23.1%
1991	2,328	+4.9%
2001	2,337	+0.4%
2011	2,693	+15.2%
2021	2,731	+1.4%

Source: Censuses

== Transport ==
The I/11 road from Ostrava to Opava runs through the municipality.

== Sights ==
The only protected cultural monument is a chapel with a belfry, which was probably built in the mid-19th century.

== Twin towns – sister cities ==
Vřesina is twinned with:

- Kornowac, Poland
