= Valentin Držkovic =

Czech painter (1888–1969)

Valentin Držkovic (10 February 1888 in Velká Polom – 27 October 1969 in Opava) was a Czech painter. He was strongly influenced by Art Nouveau and Impressionism.

== Biography ==
Držkovic graduated in theology and was ordained as a priest in 1911, he found his sense of life in the studies of painting and graphics at the Vienna Academy. After graduating, he took a number of study trips across Europe attending, France, Italy, Germany and the Carpathian Ruthenia.

He was greatly influenced by Art Nouveau and Impressionism. He devoted himself primarily to portrait painting at this time. In his work, he emphasized the psychology of portrayed characters. The model was the workers, the rogue, the maids, but also the family members and friends. In 1929, he painted the image of the "Haldy" with a strong social accent, which was also welcomed by the Paris critic at the Salon des Indépendants.

Držkovic's graphics captured the social problems with scenes from the native region. It also often captured rural life. His theological education represented the religious characters in some of his works.

He died in Opava in 1969 and is buried in a local cemetery in Velká Polom.

== See also ==
- List of Czech painters
