= Vratimov =

- Town
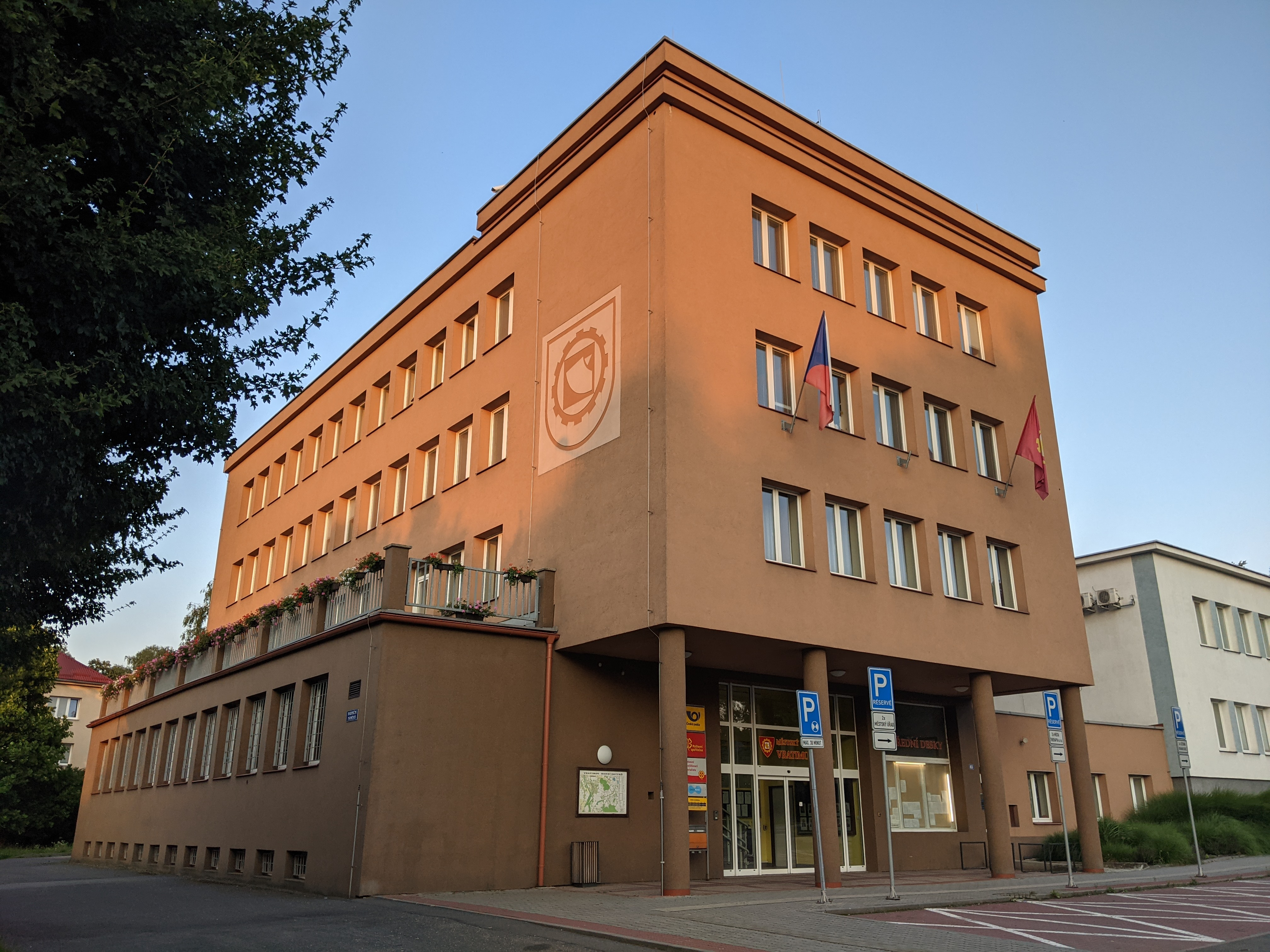
- Town hall

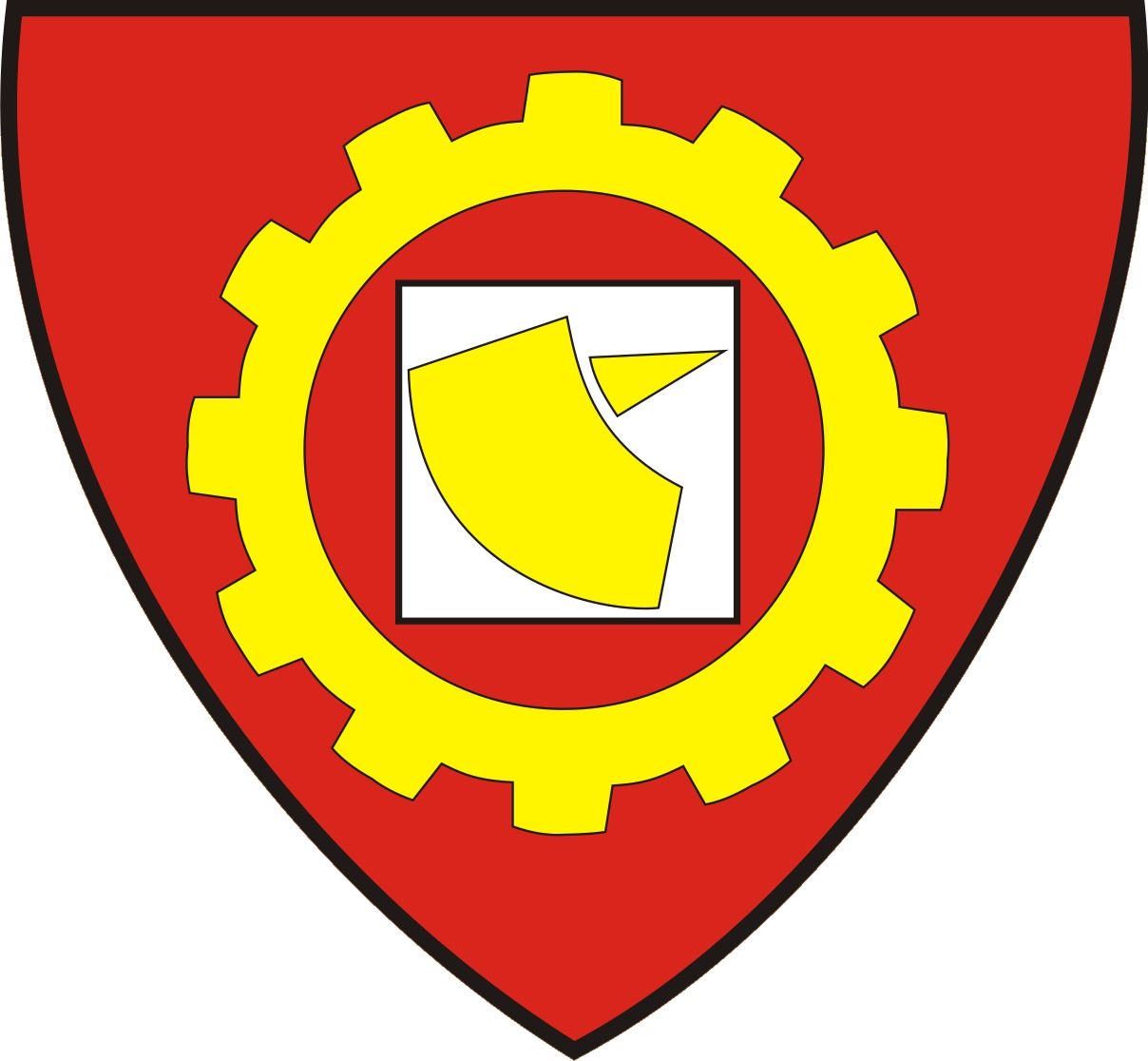
- Flag Coat of arms

- Location in the Czech Republic
- Coordinates: 49°46′12″N 18°18′37″E
- Country: Czech Republic
- Region: Moravian-Silesian
- District: Ostrava-City
- First mentioned: 1305

Government
  - Mayor: Martin Čech

Area
  - Total: 14.11 km^{2} (5.45 sq mi)
- Elevation: 250 m (820 ft)

Population (2026-01-01)
  - Total: 7,469
  - Density: 529.3/km^{2} (1,371/sq mi)
- Time zone: UTC+1 (CET)
  - Summer (DST): UTC+2 (CEST)
- Postal code: 739 32
- Website: www.vratimov.cz

Vratimov (Czech pronunciation: [ˈvracɪmof]; German: Rattimau, Polish: Racimów) is a town in Ostrava-City District in the Moravian-Silesian Region of the Czech Republic. It has about 7,500 inhabitants. The town is located on the Ostravice River in the Ostrava Basin.

Vratimov was founded in the second half of the 13th century. The main landmark is the Church of Saint John the Baptist.

== Administrative division ==
Vratimov consists of five municipal parts (in brackets population according to the 2021 census):

- Vratimov (5,544)
- Horní Datyně (1,717)

== Geography ==
Vratimov is located southeast of Ostrava, in its immediate vicinity. It lies in the Ostrava Basin, in the historical region of Cieszyn Silesia. The town is located on the right bank of the Ostravice River, which forms the western border of the municipal territory.

== History ==
Vratimov was founded during the colonisation of Cieszyn Silesia in the second half of the 13th century. The first written mention is from 1305 under its Latin name Wrothimow. The Czech name was first used in 1598.

Politically the village belonged initially to the Duchy of Teschen, formed in 1290 in the process of feudal fragmentation of Poland and was ruled by a local branch of Piast dynasty. In 1327 the duchy became a fee of Kingdom of Bohemia, which after 1526 became part of the Habsburg monarchy.

Vratimov was traditionally agricultural. In the 1880s, a pulp mill was established here and soon paper and metallurgical production was established. Industrialisation dramatically changed the character of the town.

== Demographics ==
Historical population

Year	Pop.	±%
1869	1,398	—
1880	1,747	+25.0%
1890	2,236	+28.0%
1900	2,951	+32.0%
1910	3,318	+12.4%

Year	Pop.	±%
1921	3,227	−2.7%
1930	3,785	+17.3%
1950	3,478	−8.1%
1961	7,338	+111.0%
1970	7,721	+5.2%

Year	Pop.	±%
1980	7,706	−0.2%
1991	6,791	−11.9%
2001	6,456	−4.9%
2011	6,742	+4.4%
2021	7,261	+7.7%

Source: Censuses

== Transport ==
Vratimov is located on the railway line Ostrava–Frýdlant nad Ostravicí.

== Sights ==
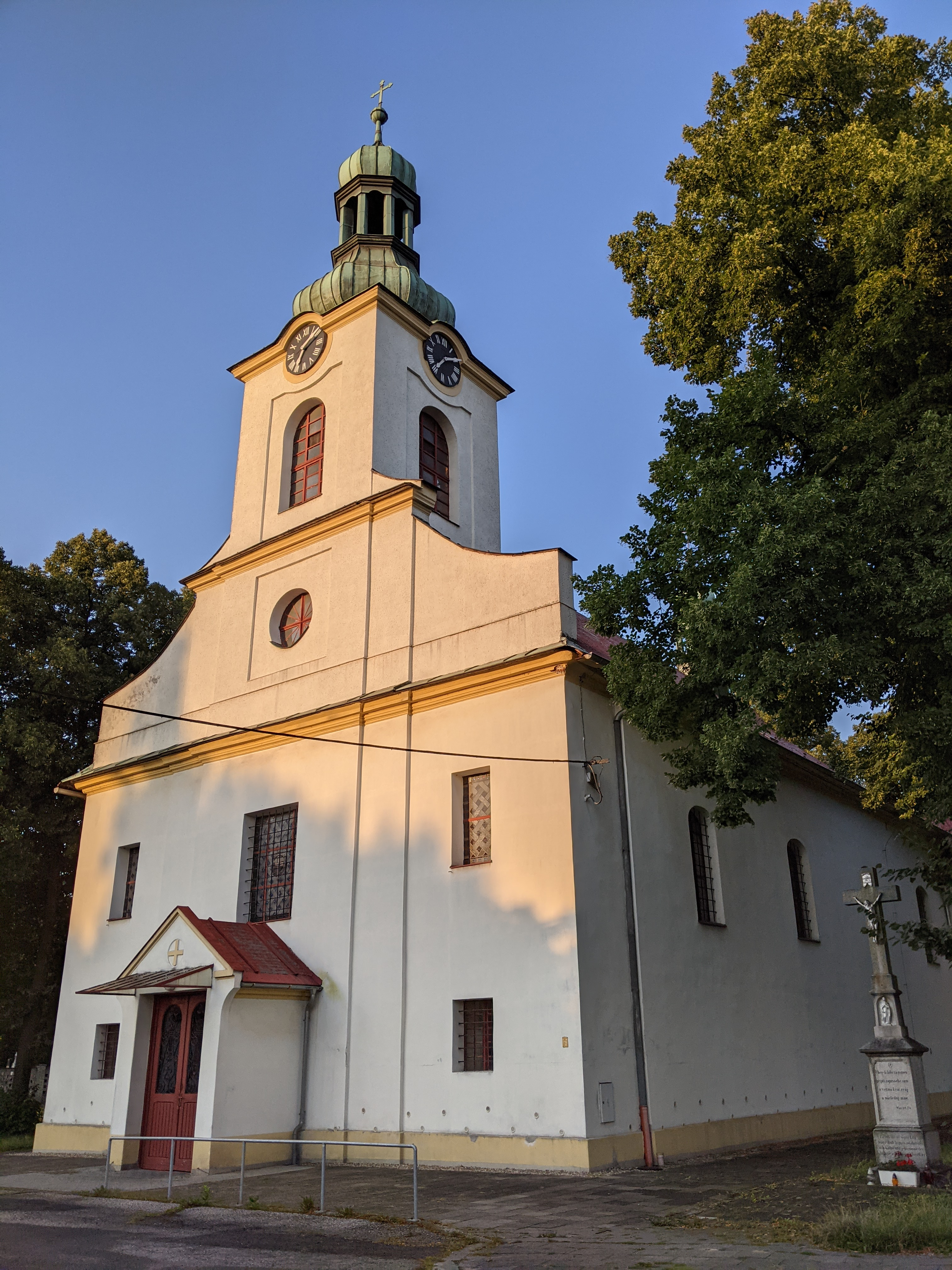
Church of Saint John the Baptist

The main landmark of Vratimov is the Church of Saint John the Baptist. The first mention of a wooden church is from 1652. After this old church fell into disrepair, a new church was built next to him in 1806 and also consecrated to St. John the Baptist.

== Twin towns – sister cities ==
Vratimov is twinned with:

- Senj, Croatia
