= Čavisov =

- Municipality
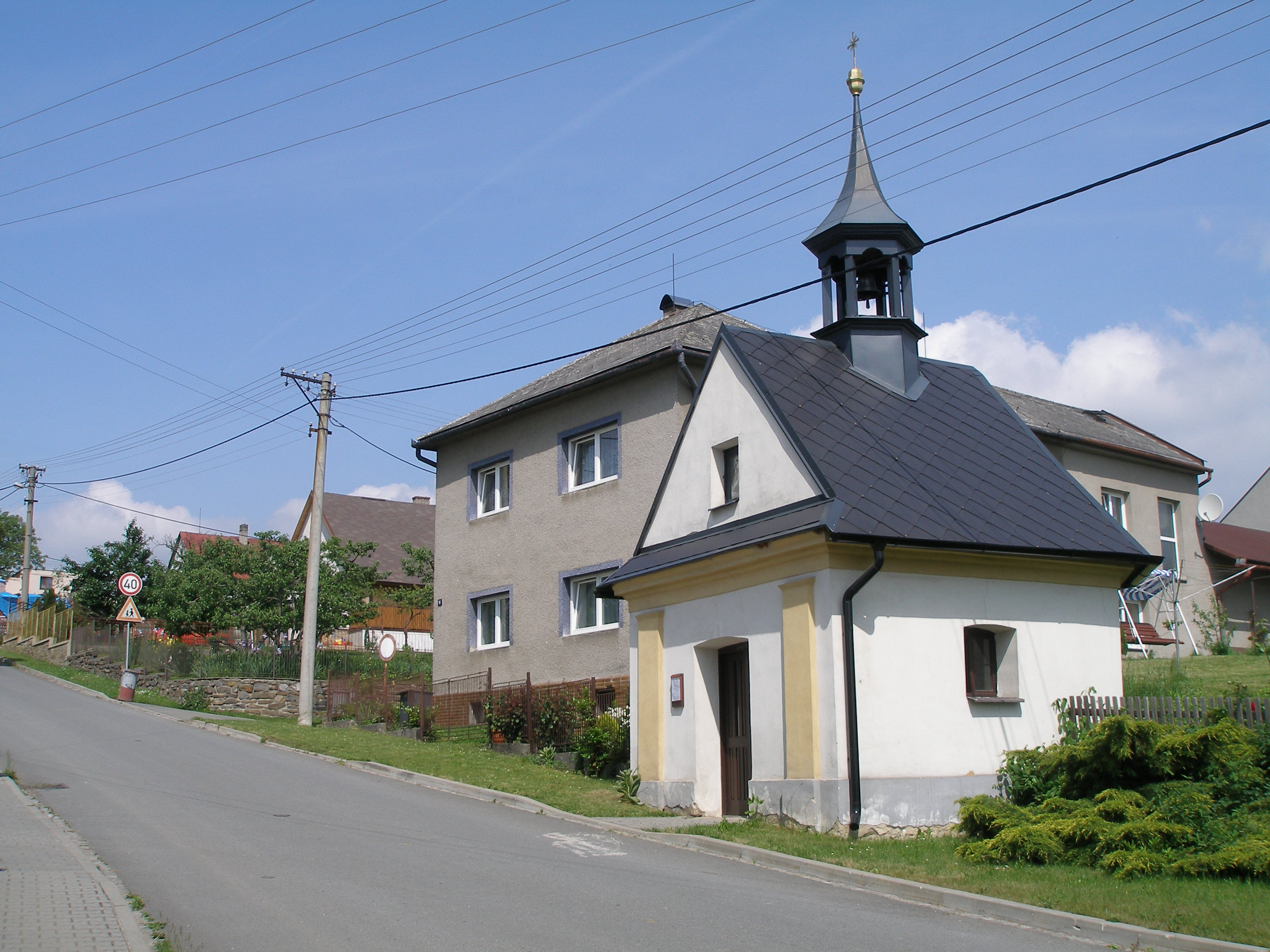
- Chapel in Čavisov

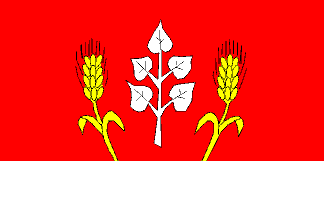
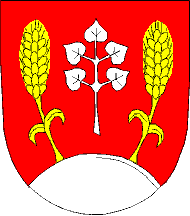
- Flag Coat of arms

- Location in the Czech Republic
- Coordinates: 49°49′46″N 18°4′51″E
- Country: Czech Republic
- Region: Moravian-Silesian
- District: Ostrava-City
- First mentioned: 1377

Area
  - Total: 4.11 km^{2} (1.59 sq mi)
- Elevation: 339 m (1,112 ft)

Population (2026-01-01)
  - Total: 512
  - Density: 125/km^{2} (323/sq mi)
- Time zone: UTC+1 (CET)
  - Summer (DST): UTC+2 (CEST)
- Postal code: 747 66
- Website: www.cavisov.cz

Čavisov is a municipality and village in Ostrava-City District in the Moravian-Silesian Region of the Czech Republic. It has about 500 inhabitants.

== Demographics ==
Historical population
Year	Pop.	±%
1869	194	—
1880	248	+27.8%
1890	258	+4.0%
1900	276	+7.0%
1910	297	+7.6%
1921	273	−8.1%
1930	341	+24.9%
1950	287	−15.8%
1961	328	+14.3%
1970	326	−0.6%
1980	370	+13.5%
1991	418	+13.0%
2001	436	+4.3%
2011	514	+17.9%
2021	488	−5.1%
Source: Censuses
