= Sedliště (Frýdek-Místek District) =

- Municipality
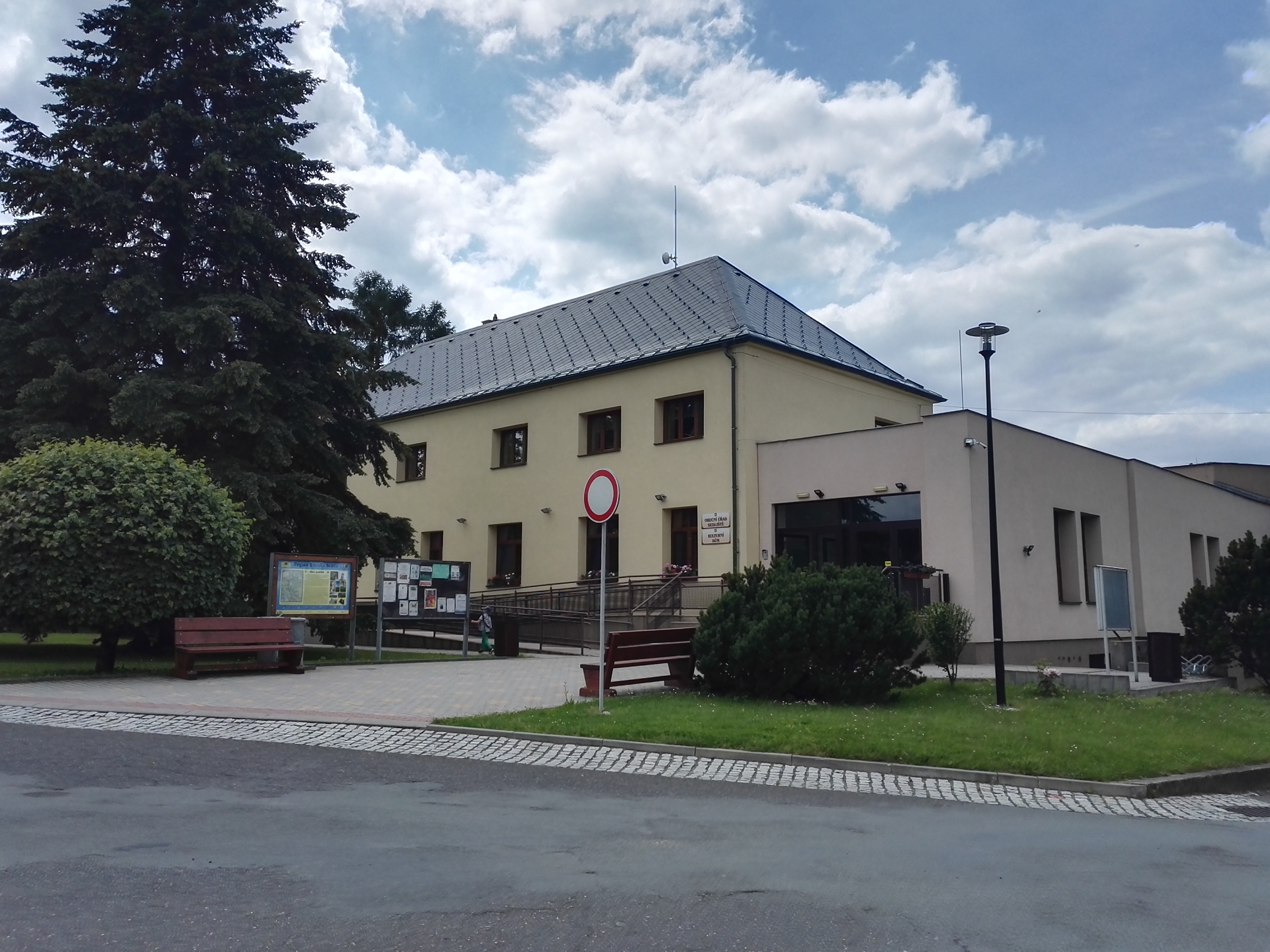
- Municipal office

- Flag Coat of arms

- Location in the Czech Republic
- Coordinates: 49°43′6″N 18°22′7″E
- Country: Czech Republic
- Region: Moravian-Silesian
- District: Frýdek-Místek
- First mentioned: 1305

Area
  - Total: 9.92 km^{2} (3.83 sq mi)
- Elevation: 330 m (1,080 ft)

Population (2026-01-01)
  - Total: 1,715
  - Density: 173/km^{2} (448/sq mi)
- Time zone: UTC+1 (CET)
  - Summer (DST): UTC+2 (CEST)
- Postal code: 739 36
- Website: www.obecsedliste.cz

Sedliště (Polish: Siedliszcze, German: Sedlischt) is a municipality and village in Frýdek-Místek District in the Moravian-Silesian Region of the Czech Republic. It has about 1,700 inhabitants.

== Geography ==
Sedliště is located about 3 kilometres (2 mi) north of Frýdek-Místek and 10 km (6 mi) southeast of Ostrava. It lies on the border between the Ostrava Basin and the Moravian-Silesian Foothills, in the historical region of Cieszyn Silesia. The highest point is the hill Černá zem at 374 m (1,227 ft) above sea level.

== History ==
The creation of the village was a part of a larger settlement campaign taking place in the late 13th century on the territory of what will be later known as Upper Silesia. Sedliště was first mentioned in a Latin document of Diocese of Wrocław called Liber fundationis episcopatus Vratislaviensis from around 1305 as Sedlicz.

Politically Sedliště belonged initially to the Duchy of Teschen, ruled by a local branch of Piast dynasty. In 1327 the duchy became a fee of Kingdom of Bohemia, which after 1526 became part of the Habsburg monarchy.

Sedliště became a seat of a Catholic parish, mentioned in the register of Peter's Pence payment from 1447 among 50 parishes of Teschen deaconry as Czedlicz.

In 1573 it was sold as one of 16 villages and the town of Frýdek and formed a state country split from the Duchy of Teschen.

After World War I and fall of Austria-Hungary, the municipality became a part of Czechoslovakia. In March 1939, it became a part of Protectorate of Bohemia and Moravia. After World War II it was restored to Czechoslovakia.

== Demographics ==
Historical population

Year	Pop.	±%
1869	997	—
1880	988	−0.9%
1890	1,007	+1.9%
1900	1,096	+8.8%
1910	1,284	+17.2%

Year	Pop.	±%
1921	1,178	−8.3%
1930	1,203	+2.1%
1950	1,098	−8.7%
1961	1,155	+5.2%
1970	1,116	−3.4%

Year	Pop.	±%
1980	1,111	−0.4%
1991	1,087	−2.2%
2001	1,190	+9.5%
2011	1,419	+19.2%
2021	1,587	+11.8%

Source: Censuses

== Transport ==
There are no railways or major roads passing through the municipality.

== Sights ==
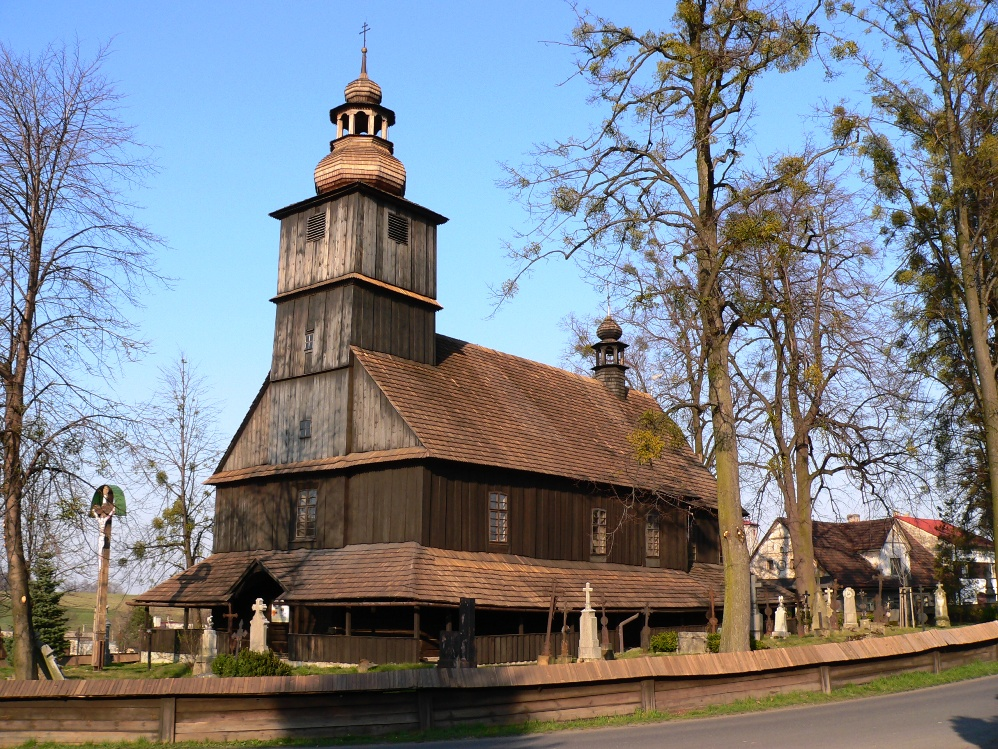
Church of All Saints

The most valuable building is the wooden Church of All Saints. It was first mentioned in 1447 and replaced by a new building in 1638. In 1862, the belfry was replaced by a new tower.
