= Zbyslavice =

- Municipality
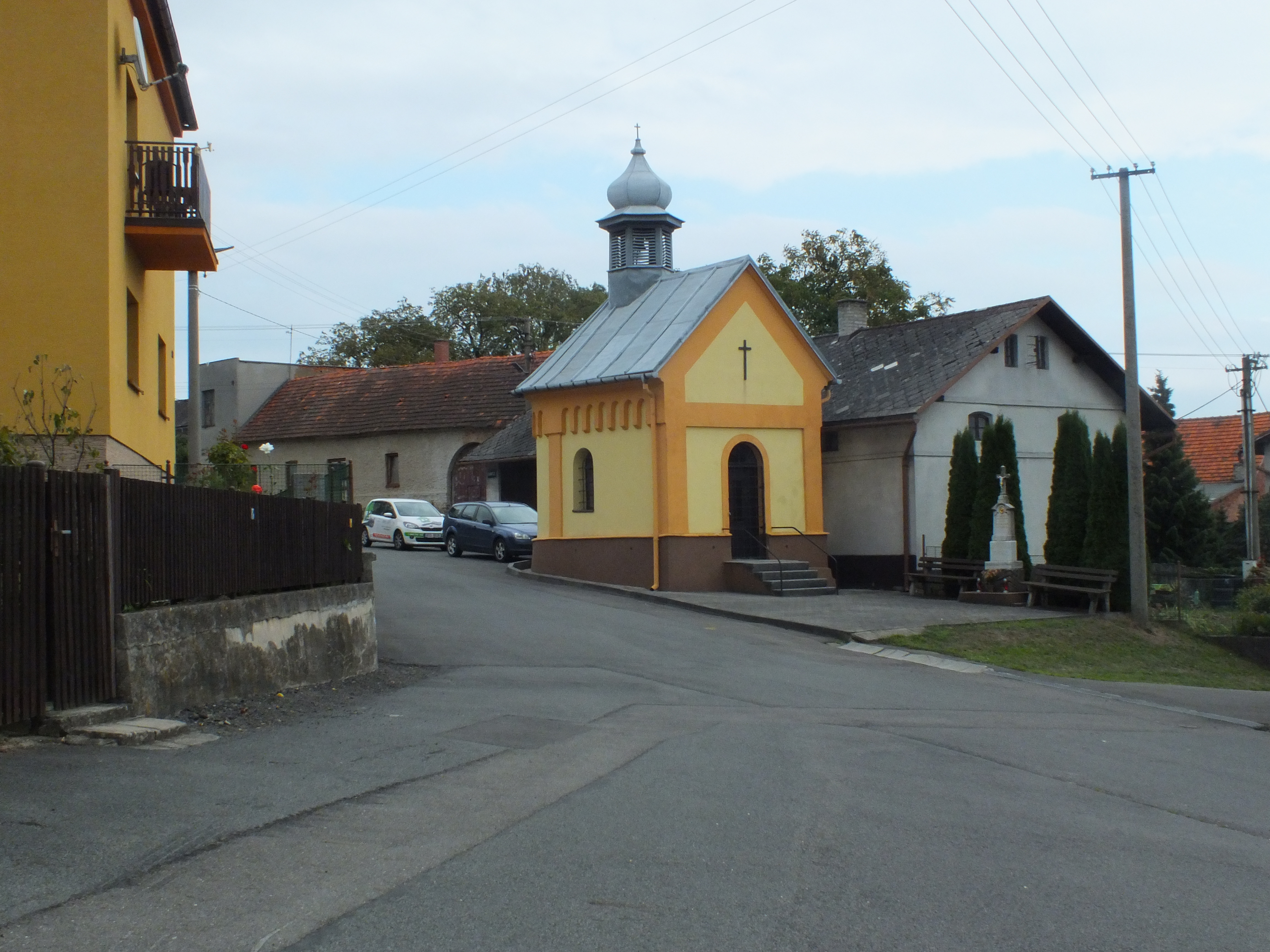
- Chapel of Saint Matthew

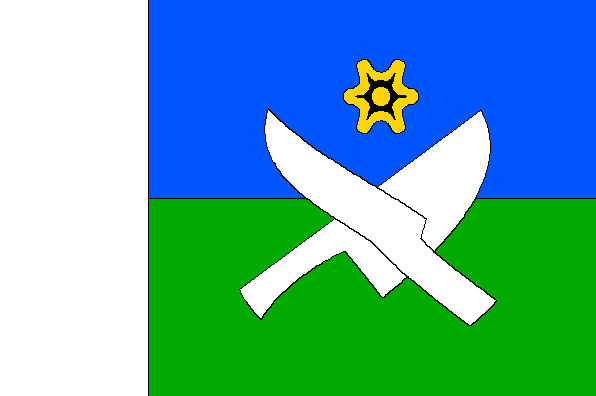
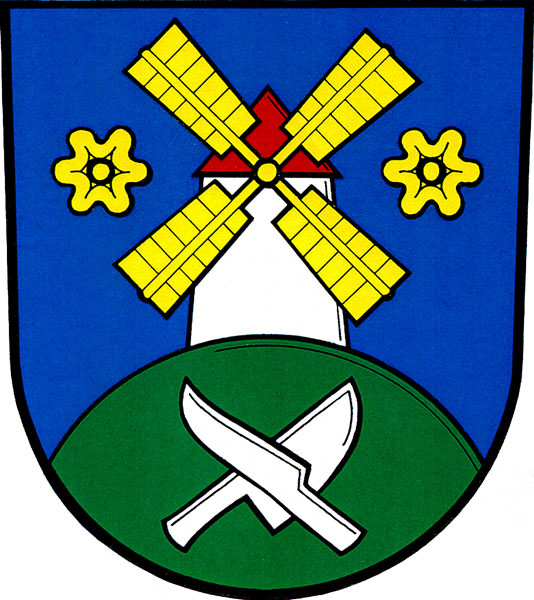
- Flag Coat of arms

- Location in the Czech Republic
- Coordinates: 49°48′19″N 18°4′32″E
- Country: Czech Republic
- Region: Moravian-Silesian
- District: Ostrava-City
- First mentioned: 1359

Area
  - Total: 7.40 km^{2} (2.86 sq mi)
- Elevation: 347 m (1,138 ft)

Population (2026-01-01)
  - Total: 667
  - Density: 90.1/km^{2} (233/sq mi)
- Time zone: UTC+1 (CET)
  - Summer (DST): UTC+2 (CEST)
- Postal code: 742 83
- Website: www.zbyslavice.cz

Zbyslavice is a municipality and village in Ostrava-City District in the Moravian-Silesian Region of the Czech Republic. It has about 700 inhabitants.

== Demographics ==
Historical population
| Year | Pop. | ±% |
|---|---|---|
| 1869 | 498 | — |
| 1880 | 531 | +6.6% |
| 1890 | 587 | +10.5% |
| 1900 | 604 | +2.9% |
| 1910 | 639 | +5.8% |
| 1921 | 676 | +5.8% |
| 1930 | 637 | −5.8% |
| 1950 | 558 | −12.4% |
| 1961 | 676 | +21.1% |
| 1970 | 589 | −12.9% |
| 1980 | 583 | −1.0% |
| 1991 | 547 | −6.2% |
| 2001 | 540 | −1.3% |
| 2011 | 599 | +10.9% |
| 2021 | 635 | +6.0% |
Source: Censuses
