= Olbramice (Ostrava-City District) =

- Municipality
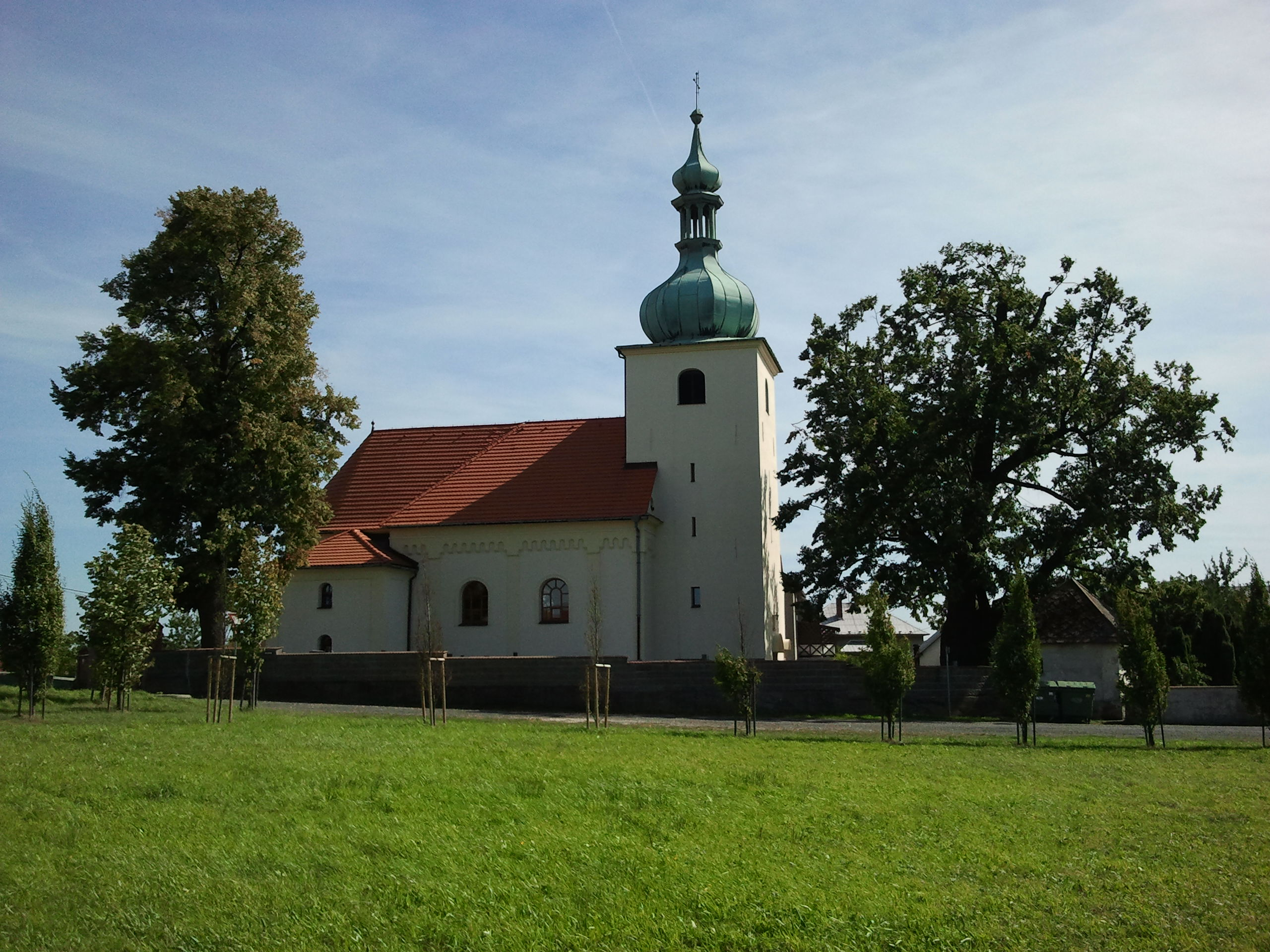
- Church of Saint Bartholomew

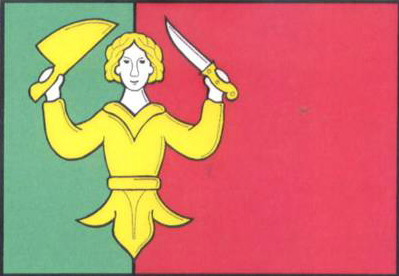
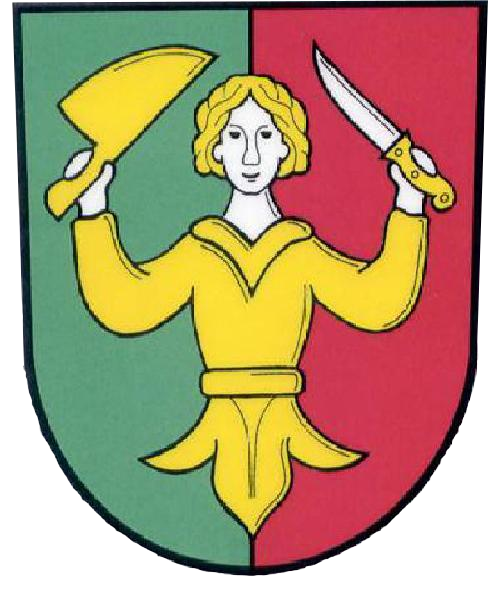
- Flag Coat of arms

- Location in the Czech Republic
- Coordinates: 49°47′22″N 18°5′20″E
- Country: Czech Republic
- Region: Moravian-Silesian
- District: Ostrava-City
- First mentioned: 1431

Area
  - Total: 5.38 km^{2} (2.08 sq mi)
- Elevation: 308 m (1,010 ft)

Population (2026-01-01)
  - Total: 731
  - Density: 136/km^{2} (352/sq mi)
- Time zone: UTC+1 (CET)
  - Summer (DST): UTC+2 (CEST)
- Postal code: 742 83
- Website: www.obecolbramice.cz

Olbramice (German: Wollmersdorf) is a municipality and village in Ostrava-City District in the Moravian-Silesian Region of the Czech Republic. It has about 700 inhabitants.

== Administrative division ==
Olbramice consists of five municipal parts (in brackets population according to the 2021 census):

- Olbramice (665)
- Janovice (32)

== Demographics ==
Historical population
Year	Pop.	±%
1869	380	—
1880	362	−4.7%
1890	378	+4.4%
1900	434	+14.8%
1910	477	+9.9%
1921	468	−1.9%
1930	571	+22.0%
1950	448	−21.5%
1961	441	−1.6%
1970	454	+2.9%
1980	436	−4.0%
1991	462	+6.0%
2001	512	+10.8%
2011	643	+25.6%
2021	697	+8.4%
Source: Censuses
