= Dolní Lhota (Ostrava-City District) =

- Municipality
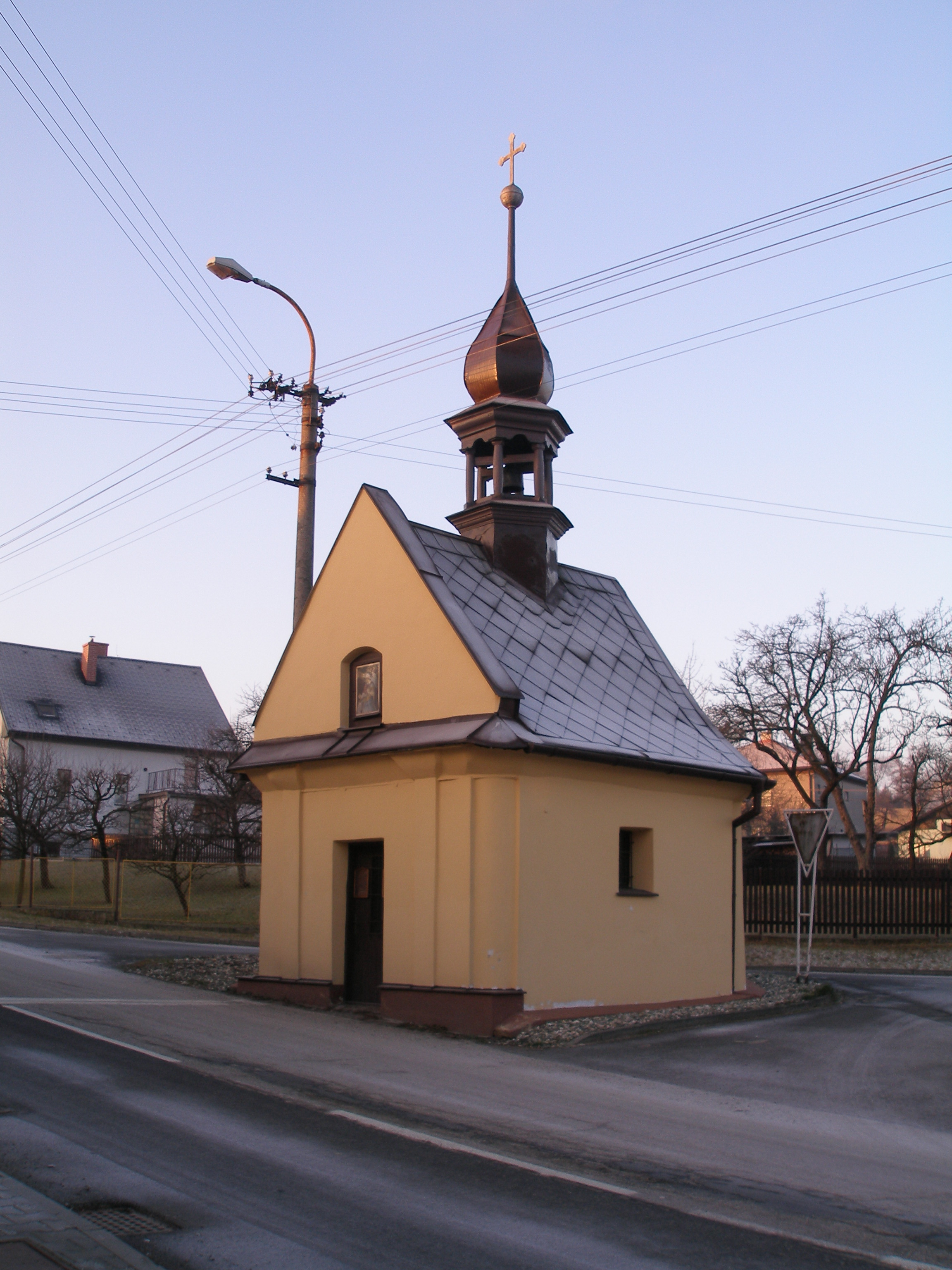
- Chapel of Saints Cyril and Methodius

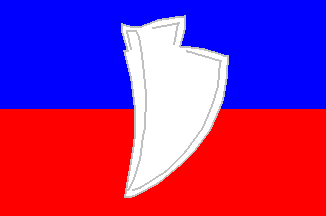
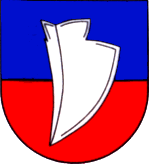
- Flag Coat of arms

- Location in the Czech Republic
- Coordinates: 49°50′32″N 18°5′33″E
- Country: Czech Republic
- Region: Moravian-Silesian
- District: Ostrava-City
- First mentioned: 1486

Area
  - Total: 5.36 km^{2} (2.07 sq mi)
- Elevation: 292 m (958 ft)

Population (2026-01-01)
  - Total: 1,527
  - Density: 285/km^{2} (738/sq mi)
- Time zone: UTC+1 (CET)
  - Summer (DST): UTC+2 (CEST)
- Postal code: 747 66
- Website: www.dolnilhota.cz

Dolní Lhota (German: Klein Ellgoth) is a municipality and village in Ostrava-City District in the Moravian-Silesian Region of the Czech Republic. It has about 1,500 inhabitants.

== Demographics ==
Historical population
| Year | Pop. | ±% |
|---|---|---|
| 1869 | 415 | — |
| 1880 | 455 | +9.6% |
| 1890 | 487 | +7.0% |
| 1900 | 552 | +13.3% |
| 1910 | 582 | +5.4% |
| 1921 | 586 | +0.7% |
| 1930 | 715 | +22.0% |
| 1950 | 723 | +1.1% |
| 1961 | 926 | +28.1% |
| 1970 | 963 | +4.0% |
| 1980 | 1,163 | +20.8% |
| 1991 | 1,236 | +6.3% |
| 2001 | 1,228 | −0.6% |
| 2011 | 1,375 | +12.0% |
| 2021 | 1,430 | +4.0% |
Source: Censuses

== Transport ==
Trams from Ostrava run to Dolní Lhota. There are three tram stops: U Obory, Dolní Lhota and Dolní Lhota osada.
