= Vřesina (Opava District) =

- Municipality
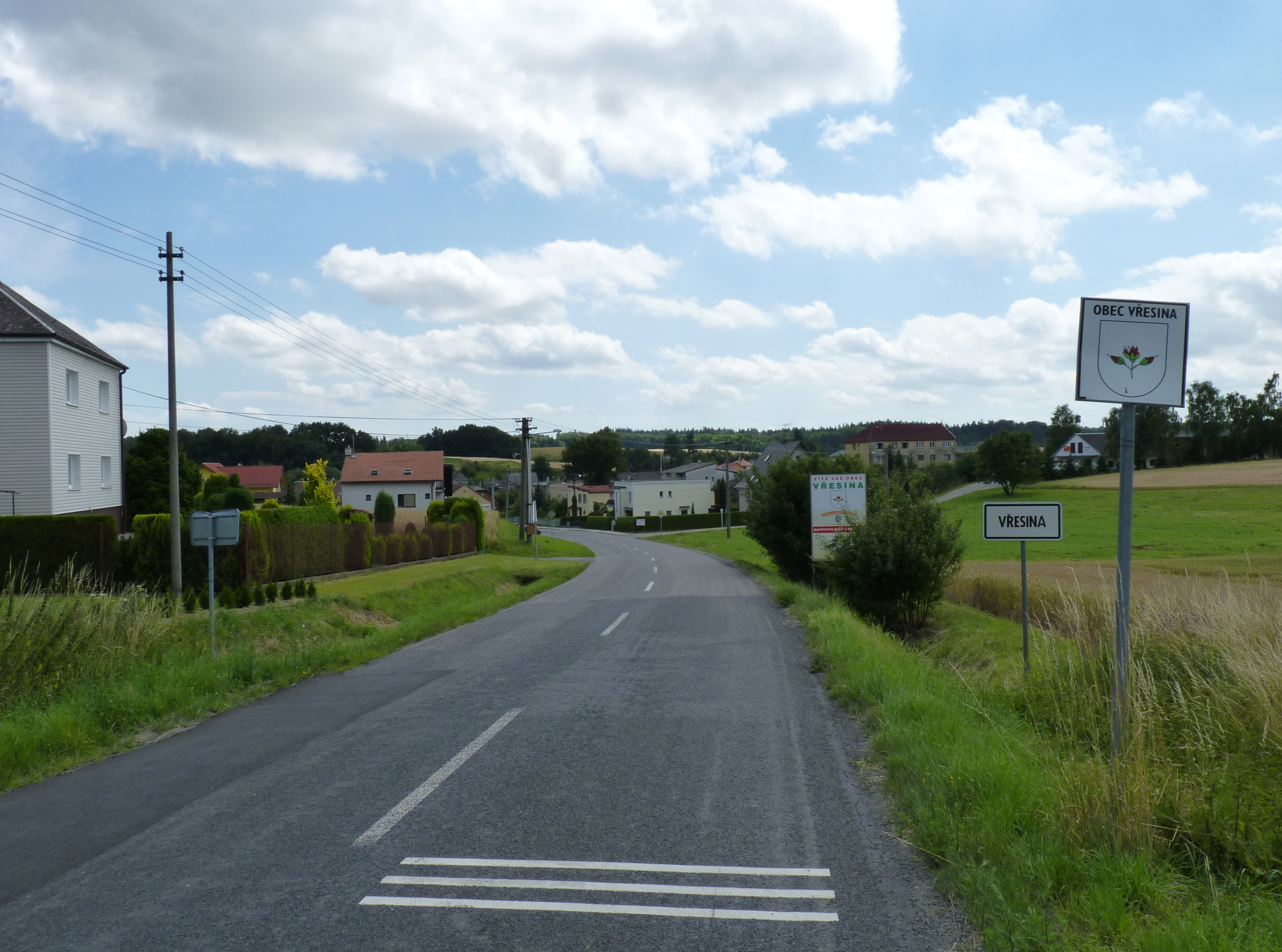
- Entrance to Vřesina

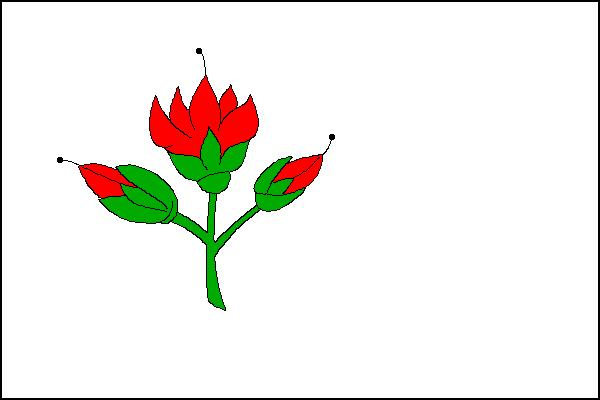
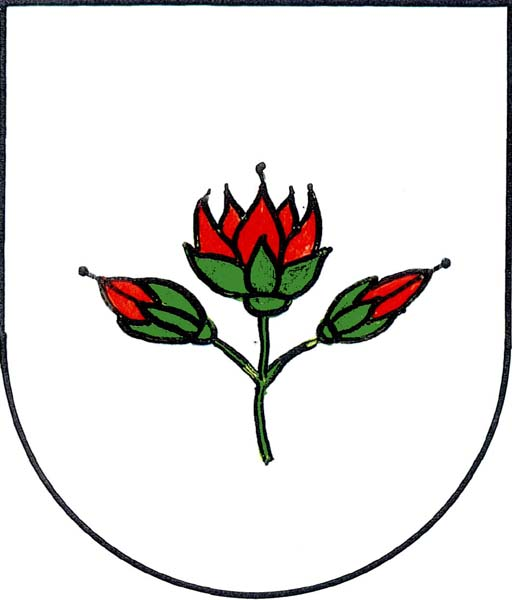
- Flag Coat of arms

- Location in the Czech Republic
- Coordinates: 49°55′19″N 18°6′28″E
- Country: Czech Republic
- Region: Moravian-Silesian
- District: Opava
- First mentioned: 1270

Area
  - Total: 6.89 km^{2} (2.66 sq mi)
- Elevation: 245 m (804 ft)

Population (2026-01-01)
  - Total: 1,674
  - Density: 243/km^{2} (629/sq mi)
- Time zone: UTC+1 (CET)
  - Summer (DST): UTC+2 (CEST)
- Postal code: 747 20
- Website: www.obec-vresina.cz

Vřesina (German: Wreschin, Polish: Wrzesin) is a municipality and village in Opava District in the Moravian-Silesian Region of the Czech Republic. It has about 1,700 inhabitants. It is part of the historic Hlučín Region.

== Geography ==
Vřesina is located about 20 kilometres (12 mi) east of Opava and 13 km (8 mi) north of Ostrava. It lies in the Opava Hilly Land. The highest point is at 285 m (935 ft) above sea level.

In the northern part of the municipality is the Dařenec Nature Reserve. It has an area of 32.7 ha (81 acres) and the object of protection is a unique natural forest.

== History ==
The first written mention of Vřesina is from 1270, when the village became property of the monastery in Velehrad.

== Demographics ==
Historical population

Year	Pop.	±%
1869	368	—
1880	406	+10.3%
1890	442	+8.9%
1900	471	+6.6%
1910	506	+7.4%

Year	Pop.	±%
1921	617	+21.9%
1930	670	+8.6%
1950	796	+18.8%
1961	1,069	+34.3%
1970	1,170	+9.4%

Year	Pop.	±%
1980	1,262	+7.9%
1991	1,261	−0.1%
2001	1,315	+4.3%
2011	1,450	+10.3%
2021	1,608	+10.9%

Source: Censuses

== Transport ==
There are no railways or major roads passing through the municipality.

== Sights ==
There are no protected cultural monuments in the municipality.

The main landmark of Vřesina is the Church of Saint William of Gellone. It is a modern church built in 1930.

== Twin towns – sister cities ==
Vřesina is twinned with:

- Kornowac, Poland
