= Horní Lhota (Ostrava-City District) =

- Municipality
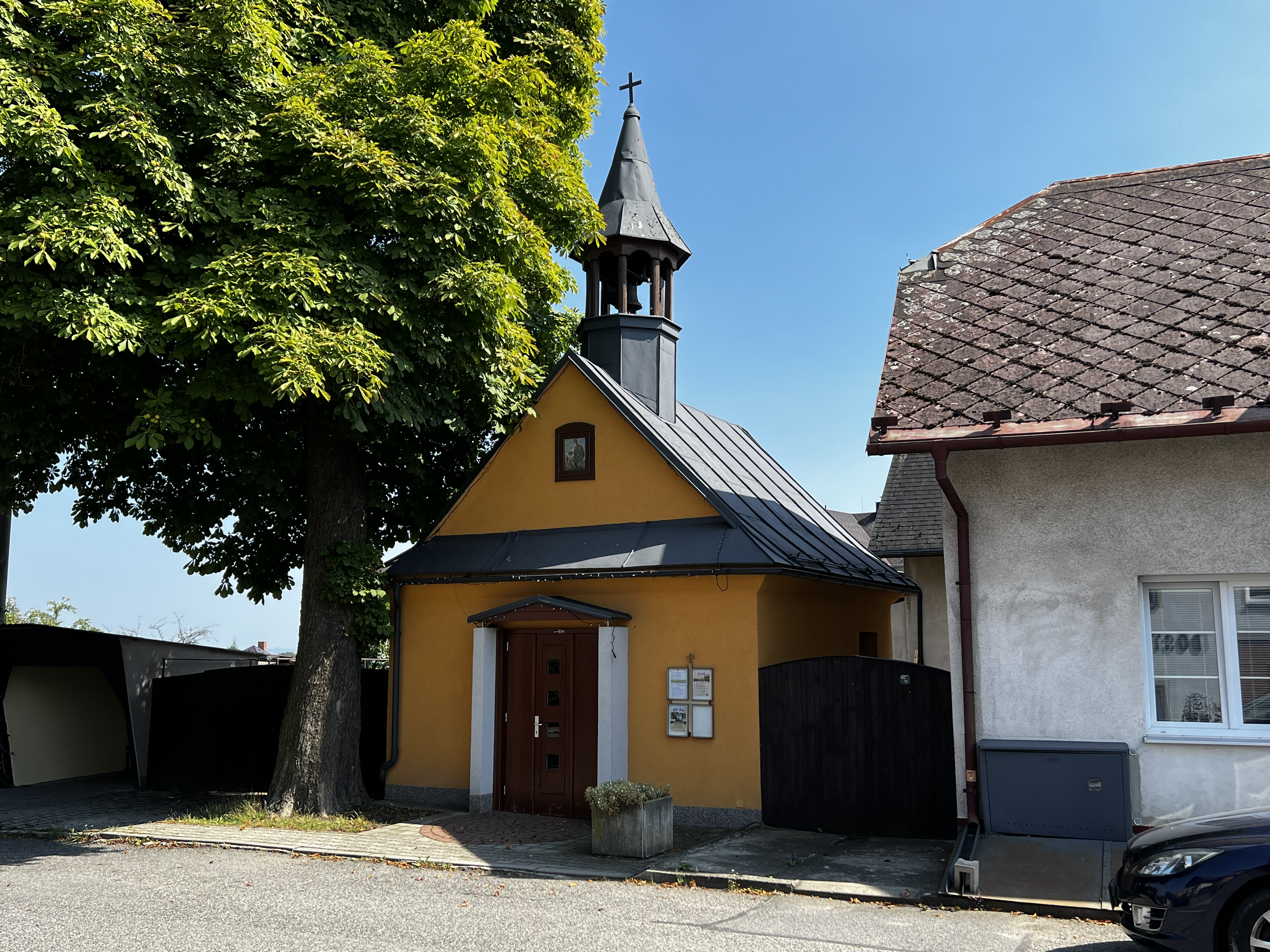
- Chapel of the Virgin Mary

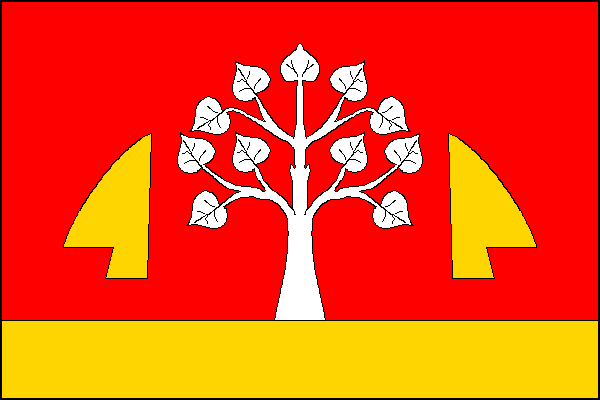
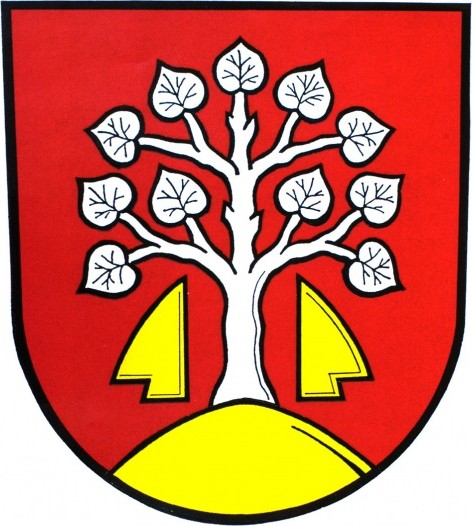
- Flag Coat of arms

- Location in the Czech Republic
- Coordinates: 49°51′11″N 18°4′6″E
- Country: Czech Republic
- Region: Moravian-Silesian
- District: Ostrava-City
- First mentioned: 1441

Area
  - Total: 4.84 km^{2} (1.87 sq mi)
- Elevation: 377 m (1,237 ft)

Population (2026-01-01)
  - Total: 856
  - Density: 177/km^{2} (458/sq mi)
- Time zone: UTC+1 (CET)
  - Summer (DST): UTC+2 (CEST)
- Postal code: 747 64
- Website: www.hornilhota.cz

Horní Lhota is a municipality and village in Ostrava-City District in the Moravian-Silesian Region of the Czech Republic. It has about 900 inhabitants.

== History ==
The first written mention of Horní Lhota is from 1441.

== Demographics ==
Historical population
Year	Pop.	±%
1869	275	—
1880	276	+0.4%
1890	334	+21.0%
1900	384	+15.0%
1910	424	+10.4%
1921	413	−2.6%
1930	537	+30.0%
1950	487	−9.3%
1961	587	+20.5%
1970	546	−7.0%
1980	495	−9.3%
1991	500	+1.0%
2001	586	+17.2%
2011	770	+31.4%
2021	813	+5.6%
Source: Censuses
