= Velká Polom =

- Municipality
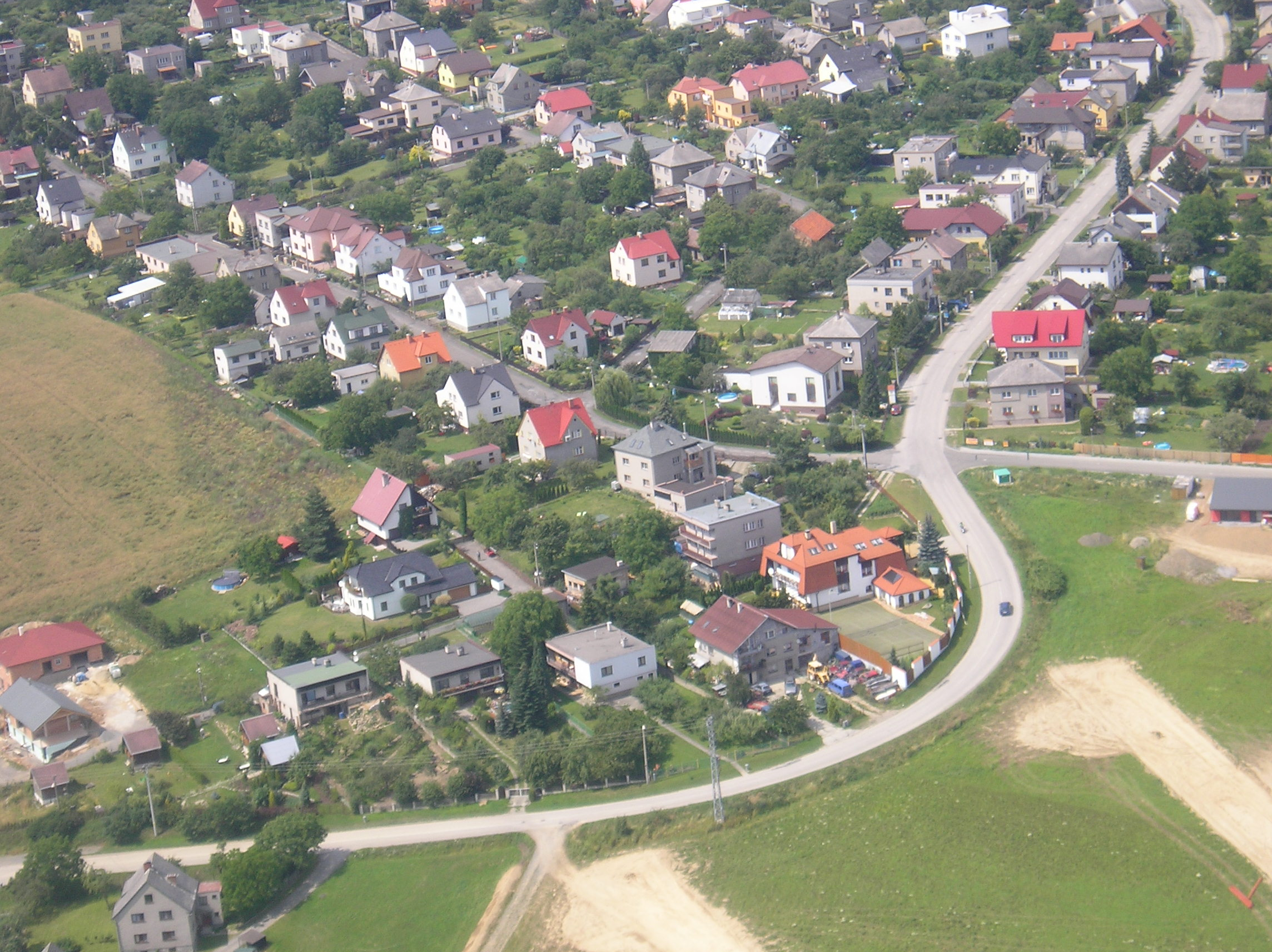
- Aerial view

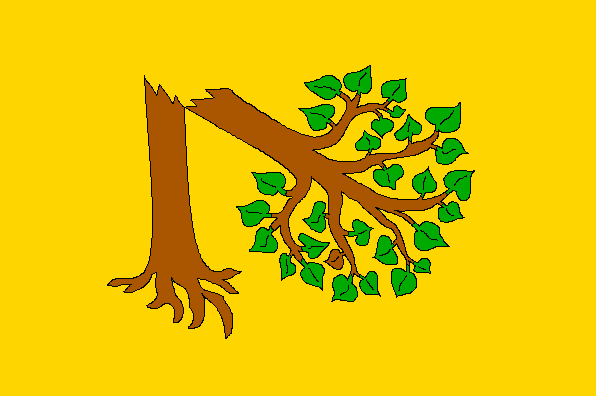
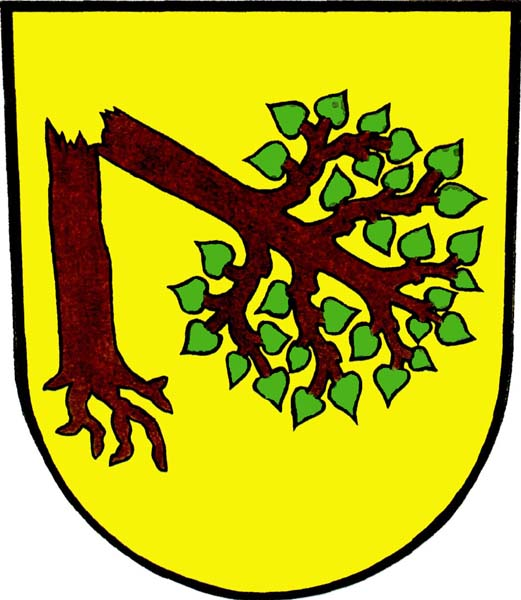
- Flag Coat of arms

- Location in the Czech Republic
- Coordinates: 49°52′1″N 18°5′49″E
- Country: Czech Republic
- Region: Moravian-Silesian
- District: Ostrava-City
- First mentioned: 1288

Area
  - Total: 11.66 km^{2} (4.50 sq mi)
- Elevation: 336 m (1,102 ft)

Population (2026-01-01)
  - Total: 2,217
  - Density: 190.1/km^{2} (492.5/sq mi)
- Time zone: UTC+1 (CET)
  - Summer (DST): UTC+2 (CEST)
- Postal code: 747 64
- Website: www.velkapolom.cz

Velká Polom is a municipality and village in Ostrava-City District in the Moravian-Silesian Region of the Czech Republic. It has about 2,200 inhabitants.

== Geography ==
Velká Polom is located about 7 kilometres (4 mi) west of Ostrava. It lies in the Nízký Jeseník range. The highest point is the hill Šibenice at 371 m (1,217 ft) above sea level.

== History ==
The first written mention of Polom is from 1288, when Weikhard of Polom was mentioned. He is considered the founder of both the village and the local water fortress. In around 1416, the village was renamed Velká Polom to distinguish from the nearby Pustá Polom. The most notable owners of the village were three families: the Donát family (1350–1486), the Pražma family (1530–1666), and the Wilczek family (1702–1918).

== Demographics ==
Historical population

Year	Pop.	±%
1869	907	—
1880	932	+2.8%
1890	1,033	+10.8%
1900	1,125	+8.9%
1910	1,272	+13.1%

Year	Pop.	±%
1921	1,318	+3.6%
1930	1,534	+16.4%
1950	1,202	−21.6%
1961	1,357	+12.9%
1970	1,312	−3.3%

Year	Pop.	±%
1980	1,579	+20.4%
1991	1,523	−3.5%
2001	1,604	+5.3%
2011	1,861	+16.0%
2021	1,989	+6.9%

Source: Censuses

== Transport ==
The I/11 road from Ostrava to Opava runs through the municipality.

== Sights ==
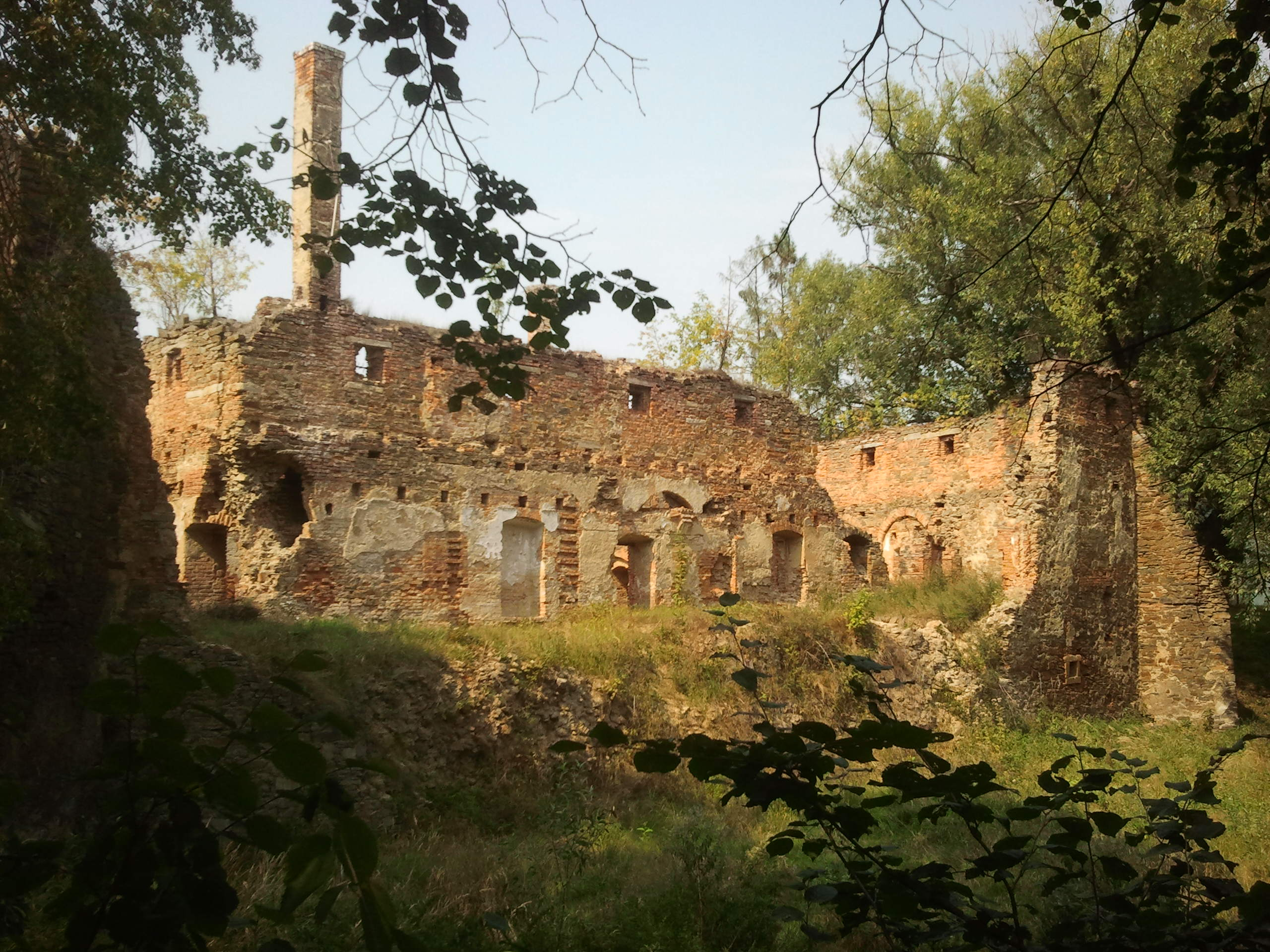
Ruin of the fortress

The Church Saint Wenceslaus was built in 1288 and is one of the oldest churches in Czech Silesia. It is one of five churches consecrated to Saint Wenceslaus which were built in the region in the 12th–13th century. The church was expanded in 1589, and the tower was added in 1741.

The former water fortress, locally called Milotička, is as old as the village. Between 1573 and 1600, it was modified in the Renaissance style. In 1805, it ceased to serve its purpose and turned into a granary and apartments. The building was devastated in the second half of the 20th century and today it is a ruin.

== Notable people ==
- Valentin Držkovic (1888–1969), painter

== Twin towns – sister cities ==
Velká Polom is twinned with:

- Dlhá nad Oravou, Slovakia
