= Ostrava Basin =

Region in the Czech Republic and Poland

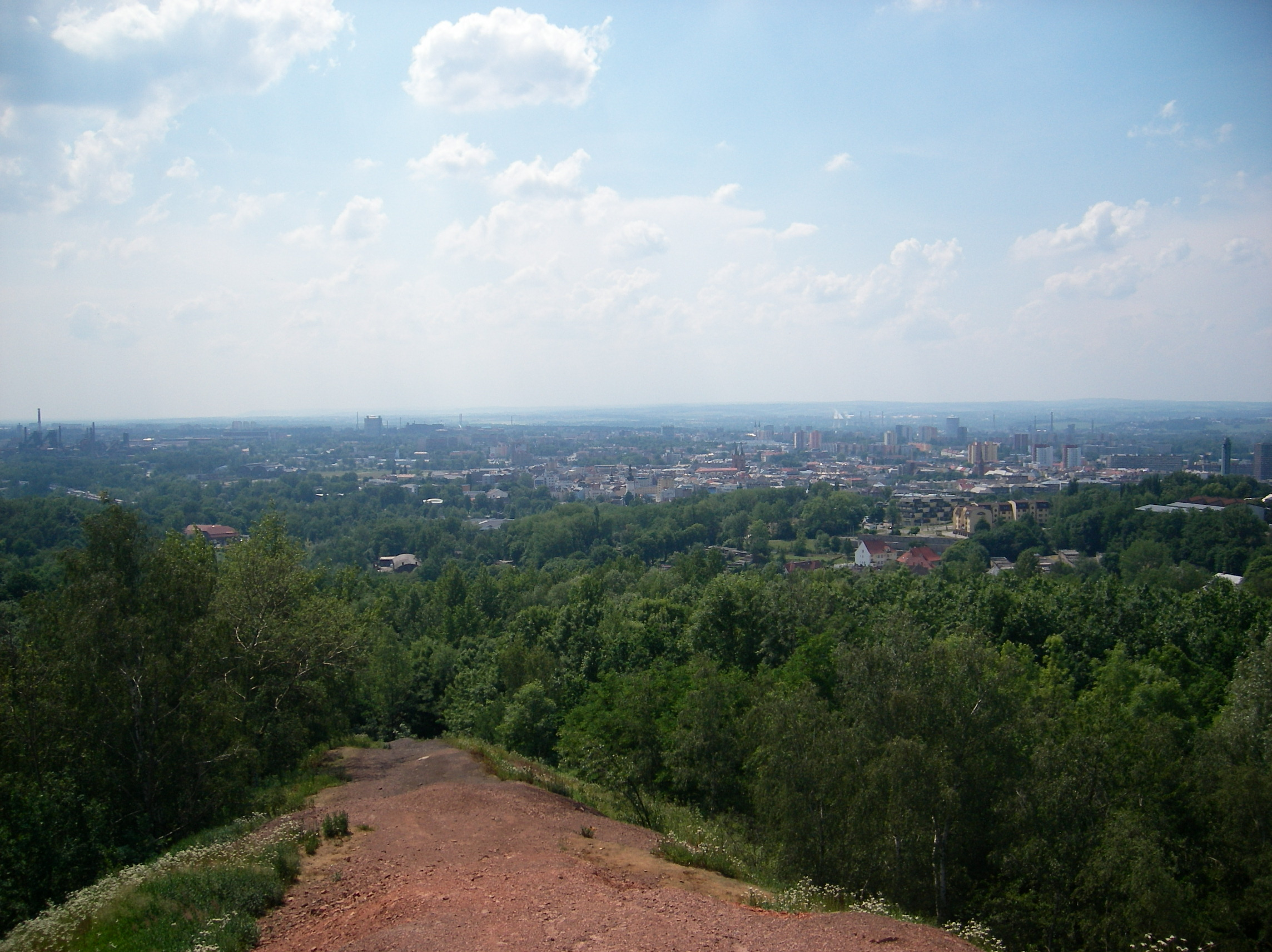
- Ostrava in the Ostrava Basin

Highest point
- Peak: Kouty
- Elevation: 337 m (1,106 ft)

Dimensions
- Area: 616 km^{2} (238 mi^{2})

Geography
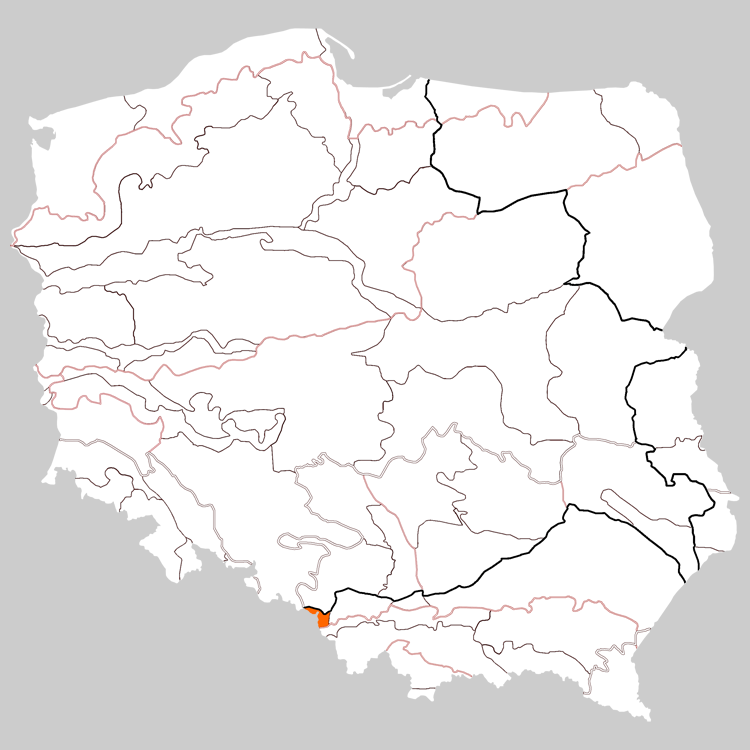
- Ostrava Basin in Poland
- Countries: Czech Republic, Poland
- Region: Moravian-Silesian Region, Silesian Voivodeship
- Range coordinates: 49°50′N 18°22′E
- Parent range: Northern Outer Subcarpathia

The Ostrava Basin (Czech: Ostravská pánev, Polish: Kotlina Ostrawska, German: Ostrauer Becken) is a lowland and a geomorphological mesoregion of the Czech Republic and Poland. It is located in the Moravian-Silesian Region of the Czech Republic and in the Silesian Voivodeship of Poland.

== Geomorphology ==
The Ostrava Basin is a mesoregion of the Northern Outer Subcarpathia within the Outer Subcarpathia in the Western Carpathians. The territory is heavily disturbed by Tertiary radial tectonics. The relief has the character of a plain or flat uplands with rounded ridges. Extensive flat floodplains, lined with steep ale relatively low terraces, are typical. An important element of the relief are anthropogenic shapes caused by industrial and mining activities, especially spoil tips. The basin is further subdivided into eights microregions, seven in the Czech Republic and one in Poland: Antošovice Plain, Ostrava Floodplain, Karviná Plateau, Havířov Plateau, Nová Bělá Plain, Poruba Plateau, Orlová Plateau (in the Czech Republic) and Kończyce High Plain (in Poland).

The area is poor in hills. The highest peak is Kouty at 337 metres (1,106 ft) above sea level, located in the territory of Sedliště.

== Geography ==
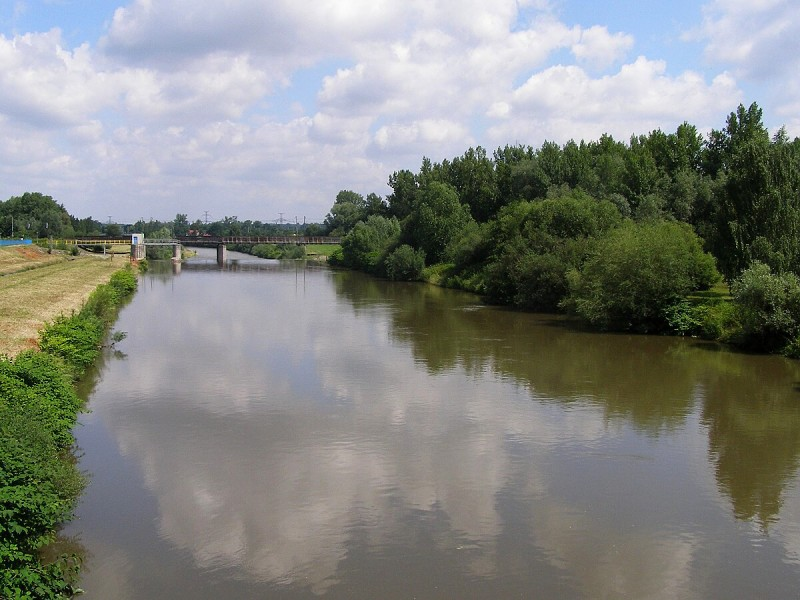
Olza River in Dětmarovice

The territory has an area of 616 square kilometres (238 sq mi), of which 486 km^{2} (188 sq mi) in the Czech Republic and 130 km^{2} (50 sq mi) in Poland, and an average elevation of 244 metres (801 ft) above sea level.

Numerous springs are typical for the Ostrava Basin. There is a confluence of several important rivers here: Oder, Olza, Ostravice, Opava and Lučina. The territory contains mineral waters with a unique chemical composition within the Czech Republic (Klimkovice and Lázně Darkov spas).

Coal deposits were discovered in the late 18th century, as a result, the area was heavily industrialized in the 19th century, and henceforth urbanized. The most populated settlements in the territory are Ostrava, Havířov, Karviná, Orlová and Bohumín. Frýdek-Místek is also partially located here.
