= Klimkovice =

- Town
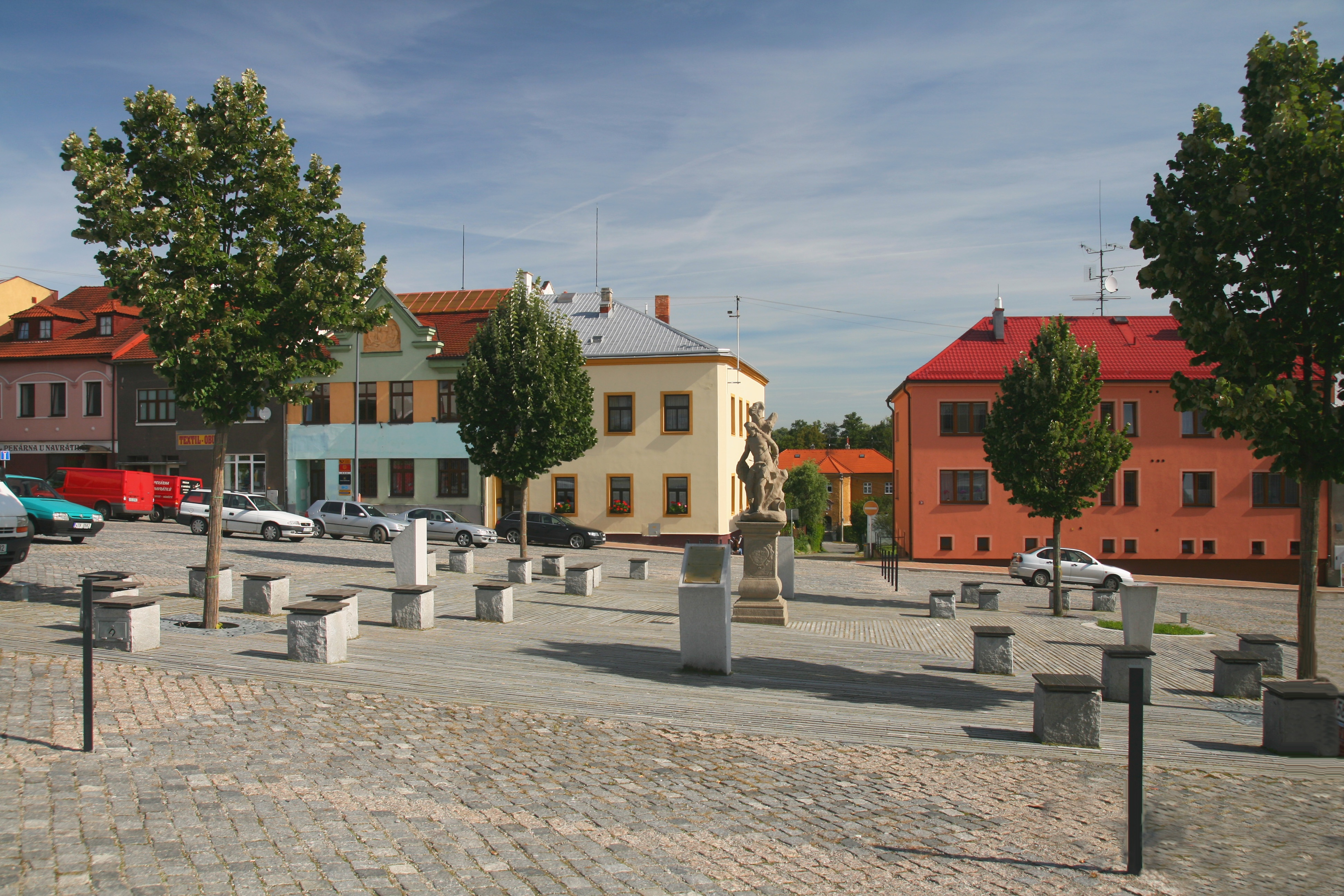
- Town square

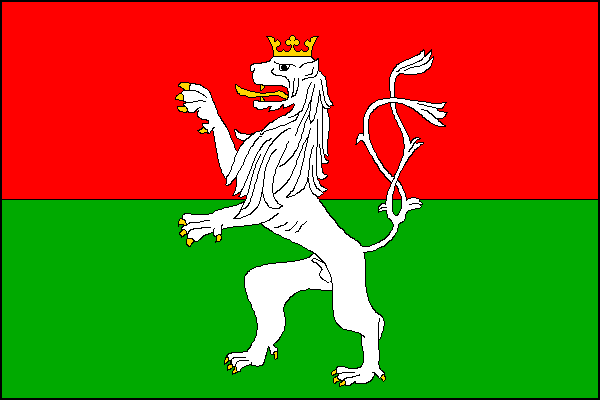
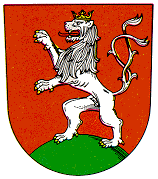
- Flag Coat of arms

- Location in the Czech Republic
- Coordinates: 49°47′17″N 18°7′33″E
- Country: Czech Republic
- Region: Moravian-Silesian
- District: Ostrava-City
- First mentioned: 1398

Government
  - Mayor: Jaroslav Varga

Area
  - Total: 14.64 km^{2} (5.65 sq mi)
- Elevation: 252 m (827 ft)

Population (2026-01-01)
  - Total: 4,396
  - Density: 300.3/km^{2} (777.7/sq mi)
- Time zone: UTC+1 (CET)
  - Summer (DST): UTC+2 (CEST)
- Postal code: 742 83
- Website: www.mesto-klimkovice.cz

Klimkovice (Czech pronunciation: [ˈklɪmkovɪtsɛ]; German: Königsberg) is a spa town in Ostrava-City District in the Moravian-Silesian Region of the Czech Republic. It has about 4,400 inhabitants. The town proper is located on the Polančice Stream in the Moravian Gate lowland.

== Administrative division ==
Klimkovice consists of four municipal parts (in brackets population according to the 2021 census):

- Klimkovice (3,286)
- Hýlov (246)
- Josefovice (317)
- Václavovice (457)

== Etymology ==
The name Klimkovice is derived from the personal name Klimek or Klimko (pet forms of the name Klement). It was probably the lokator of the town.

== Geography ==
Klimkovice is located about 5 kilometres (3 mi) west of Ostrava. It lies mostly in the Moravian Gate lowland. The northern part of the municipal territory lies in the Nízký Jeseník range and includes the highest point of Klimkovice at 374 m (1,227 ft) above sea level. The Polančice Stream flows through the town. There are several small fishponds around the town.

== History ==
Klimkovice was probably founded by Beneš I of Kravaře, who owned the area between 1383 and 1398. The first written mention of Klimkovice is from 1386, when it was already a town.

In 1766, presence of hard coal was discovered in Klimkovice and it was the first discovery of coal in the Moravian-Silesian Region. However, it was not mined.

According to the Austro-Hungarian census of 1910, 91.2% of the inhabitants were Czech-speaking and 8.5% were German-speaking. Almost all the inhabitants were Roman Catholics.

== Demographics ==
Historical population

Year	Pop.	±%
1869	2,531	—
1880	2,754	+8.8%
1890	3,003	+9.0%
1900	2,979	−0.8%
1910	3,269	+9.7%

Year	Pop.	±%
1921	3,399	+4.0%
1930	3,877	+14.1%
1950	3,689	−4.8%
1961	3,495	−5.3%
1970	3,423	−2.1%

Year	Pop.	±%
1980	3,551	+3.7%
1991	3,628	+2.2%
2001	3,770	+3.9%
2011	4,165	+10.5%
2021	4,306	+3.4%

Source: Censuses

== Economy ==
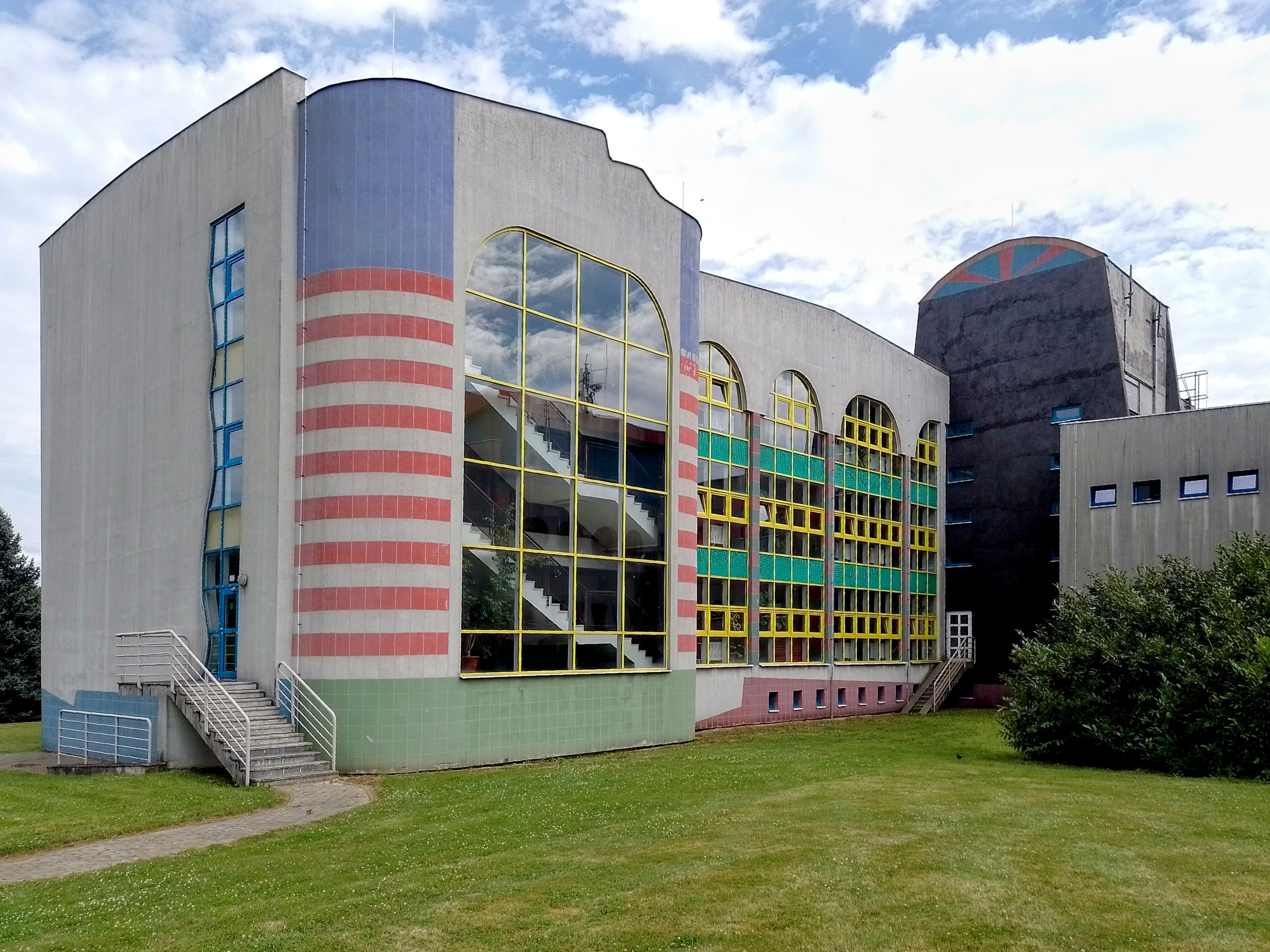
Klimkovice spa complex

Klimkovice is known for a spa. The spa uses iodine-bromine waters with a high salt content. The spa treats diseases of the musculoskeletal system, neurological and gynecological diseases, diseases of the circulatory system, and metabolic disorders.

== Transport ==
The D1 motorway from Brno to Ostrava runs through the municipal territory. The Klimkovice Tunnel is located on it.

== Sights ==
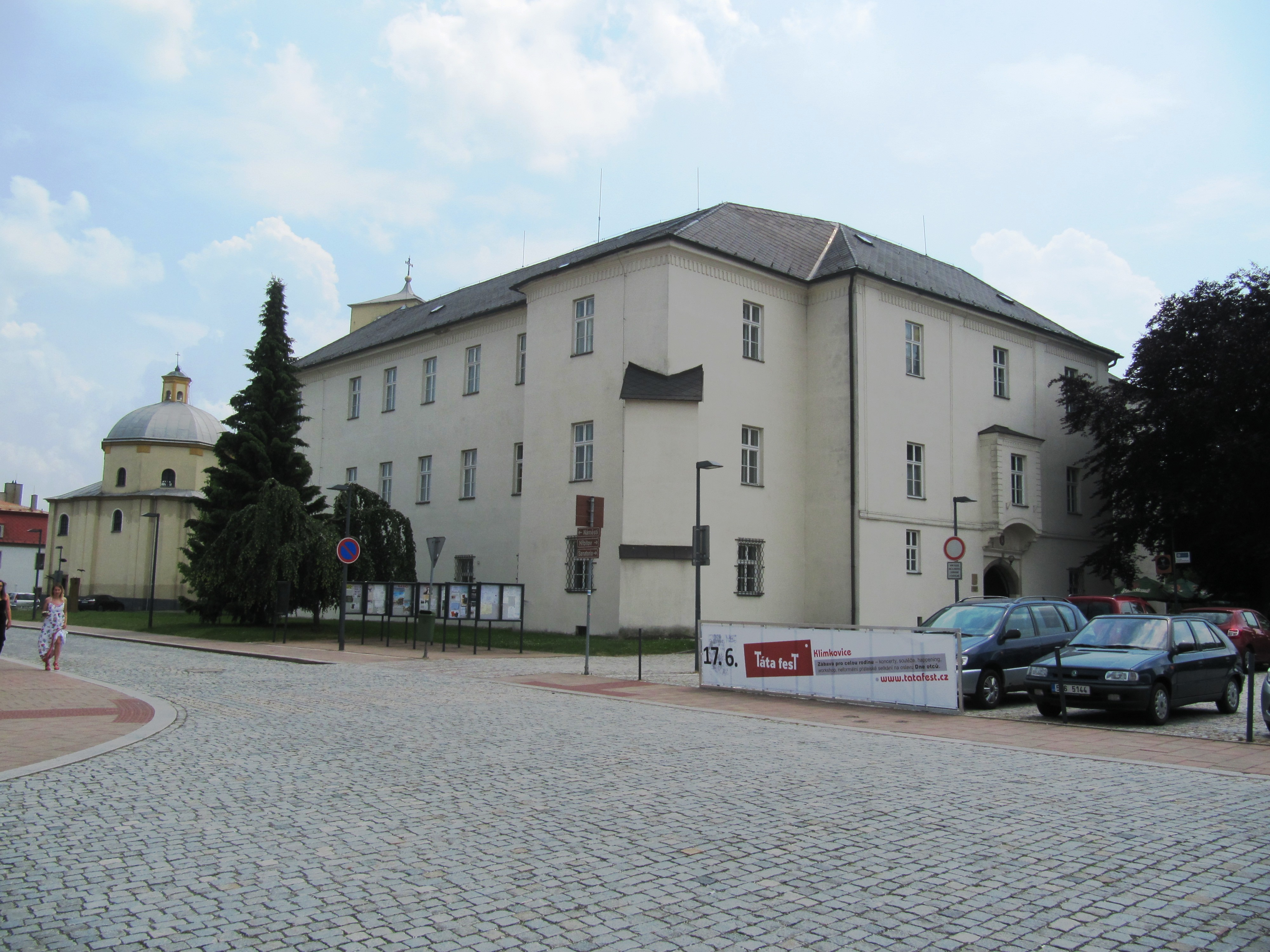
Klimkovice Castle and the Church of Saint Catherine

The Klimkovice Castle is a Renaissance castle, built in 1578–1579 on the site of a medieval fortress. Its current appearance is a result of reconstructions after fires in 1854 and 1945. It is connected by a covered corridor with the adjacent Church of Saint Catherine. Today the castle houses the municipal office, the cultural and information centre of Klimkovice, and a museum. The castle gardens were turned into a town park in 1946–1954.

The Church of Saint Catherine in the centre of Klimkovice dates from the end of the 14th century. The tower was added in the second half of the 15th century. The church was built in the Gothic style; later Renaissance and Baroque modifications were made. A reconstruction took place after a fire in 1854.

The Church of the Holy Trinity was built in the Renaissance style in 1525–1529. It is a former cemetery church.

== Notable people ==
- Arnošt Klíma (1916–2000), historian
- Vladimír Vůjtek (born 1947), ice hockey player and coach
- Tereza Švábíková (born 2000), badminton player

== Twin towns – sister cities ==
Klimkovice is twinned with:

- Ilava, Slovakia
- Mikołów, Poland
