= Hlučín Region =

Region of the Czech Republic

Coordinates: 49°52′48″N 18°11′35″E

Map of the Hlučín Region

Hlučín Region (Czech: Hlučínsko, German: Hultschiner Ländchen, Polish: Ziemia hulczyńska) is a historically significant part of Czech Silesia, now part of the Moravian-Silesian Region in the Czech Republic. It is named after its largest town, Hlučín. Its area is 316.9 km^{2} (122.4 sq mi), and in 2021, it had 66,750 inhabitants.

== Municipalities ==
In terms of the current municipal division, the region consists of the following 27 municipalities. Towns are shown in bold.

Bělá (Bielau) – Bohuslavice (Buslawitz) – Bolatice (Bolatitz) – Chlebičov (Klebsch) – Chuchelná (Kuchelna) – Darkovice (Groß Darkowitz) – Dolní Benešov (Beneschau) – Hať (Haatsch) – Hlučín (Hultschin) – Hněvošice (Schreibersdorf) – Kobeřice (Köberwitz) – Kozmice (Kosmütz) – Kravaře (Deutsch Krawarn) – Ludgeřovice (Ludgierzowitz) – Markvartovice (Markersdorf) – Oldřišov (Odersch) – Píšť (Pyschcz / Sandau) – Rohov (Rohow) – Šilheřovice (Schillersdorf) – Služovice (Schlausewitz) – Štěpánkovice (Schepankowitz) – Strahovice (Strandorf) – Sudice (Zauditz) – Třebom (Thröm) – Velké Hoštice (Groß Hoschütz) – Vřesina (Wreschin) – Závada (Zawada bei Beneschau)

These municipalities cooperate in microregion Sdružení obcí Hlučínska since 1992.

Also, the former municipalities of Malé Hoštice (Klein Hoschütz), now district of Opava, and Hošťálkovice (Hoschialkowitz), Lhotka (Ellguth), Petřkovice (Petershofen), Koblov (Koblau) and Antošovice (Antoschowitz), now districts or parts of Ostrava, once belonged to the region.

== Geography ==
Hlučín Region lies in the Opava Hilly Land within the Silesian Lowlands. The Opava River flows through the region. Hlučín Region contains several water bodies, the largest of which are the artificial lakes Hlučínské and Jezero, and the Nezmar fish pond.

== History ==
Archaeological finds suggest that the area was inhabited since 4500 to 2500 BC.

The medieval bishoprics of both Olomouc and Wrocław attempted to control it. In the end, Olomouc won the dispute, and the area became part of the March of Moravia. In 1269, Hlučín belonged to the lands that were split off Moravia by King Ottokar II of Bohemia as the Duchy of Opava, ruled by his illegitimate son Duke Nicholas I. Differences in culture, traditions and economic development from the rest of Moravia then grew, mainly caused by Germanisation during the course of the Ostsiedlung. From 1526 onwards, the Duchy of Troppau, along with the Lands of the Bohemian Crown, was part of the Habsburg monarchy.

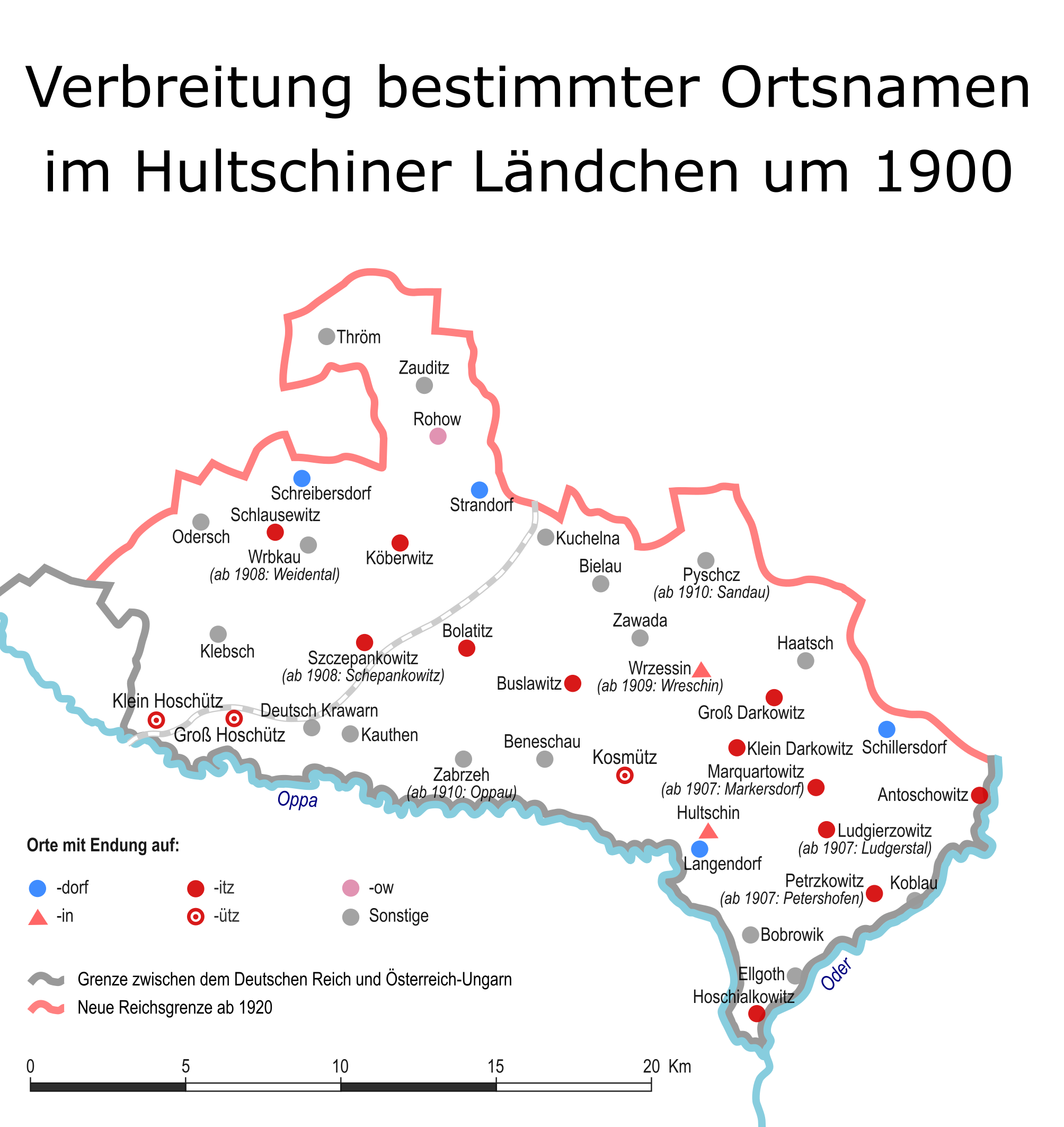
Place names in the Hultschin Region around 1900

The history of Hlučín Region as an entity began with the Treaty of Breslau, signed on 11 June 1742 between King Frederick II of Prussia and Empress Maria Theresa of Austria. In 1740, Prussia started the First Silesian War and conquered most of Silesia. According to the terms of the treaty, the Duchy of Troppau was partitioned: the lands south of the Opava River remained with Austrian Silesia, whereas the northern part around Hlučín fell to Prussia and was incorporated into the Province of Silesia in 1815.

On 4 February 1920, Hlučín Region was handed over without a referendum to Czechoslovakia, according to Article 83 of the Treaty of Versailles, though surveys suggested that its people felt more as being part of Upper Silesia and mostly would have preferred to join the German Weimar Republic.

Czechoslovak troops and authorities did not receive the friendly reception that they had expected as "liberators". When the Czechoslovaks moved into Deutsch-Krawarn, the whole population was in the streets and sang in unison the Deutschlandlied.

Even though the region's German speakers were officially protected in their rights by Czechoslovakia, repressions on language policy and schooling in German were instituted. The enforcement of a Czechoslovak identity on the citizens also raised public opposition.

On 1 October 1938, Hlučín Region was occupied by Nazi Germany, as part of the area taken from Czechoslovakia, with the Munich Agreement. However, unlike the other formerly Czechoslovak domains, it was not attached to the Reichsgau Sudetenland but again to the Prussian Province of Silesia (Upper Silesia from 1941).

After World War II, Hlučín Region, like the rest of the Sudetenland, was returned to Czechoslovakia. However, unlike millions of other German speakers in the country, the region was spared a mass expulsion, and only 3000 citizens had to emigrate.

After the 1993 dissolution of Czechoslovakia, the region became part of the Czech Republic. Today, a sizable number of the region's citizens are binationals and also have German citizenship.

== Sights ==
The main sights of the region are:

- Nature reservation Dařanec near Vřesina
- Castles in Hlučín, Kravaře, Šilheřovice, Dolní Benešov, Velké Hoštice, Chuchelná and Oldřišov
- Open-air museums in Bolatice and Kobeřice
- Museum of the fortifications in Hlučín
- Church buildings in Ludgeřovice, Hněvošice, pilgrimage place in Píšť
- Hlučín Lake

== Partner regions ==
- Plateau of the Good Land LAG, Poland

== See also ==
- Czech Silesia
- Rychtal Region
