= Kozmice (Opava District) =

- Municipality
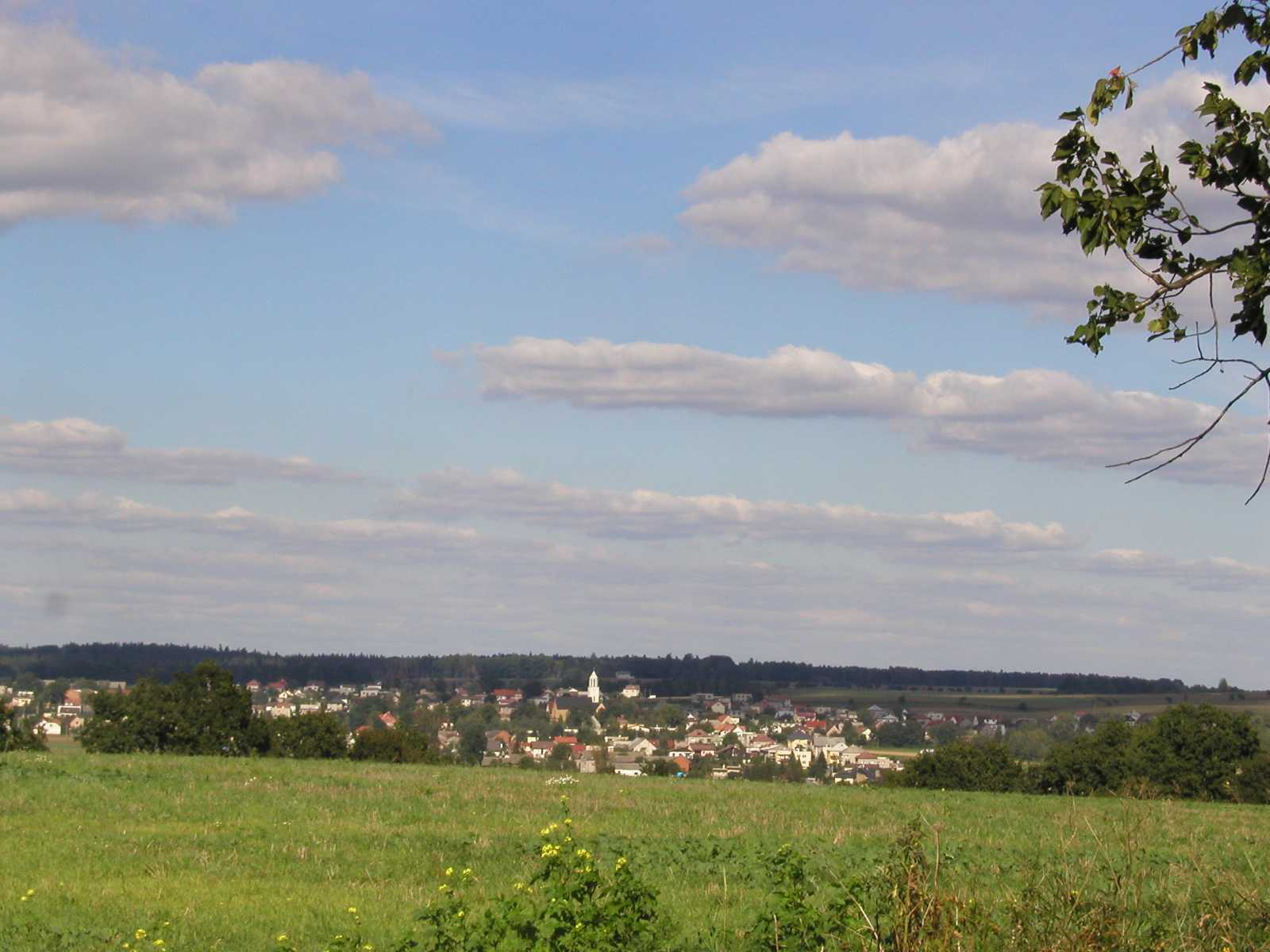
- View of Kozmice

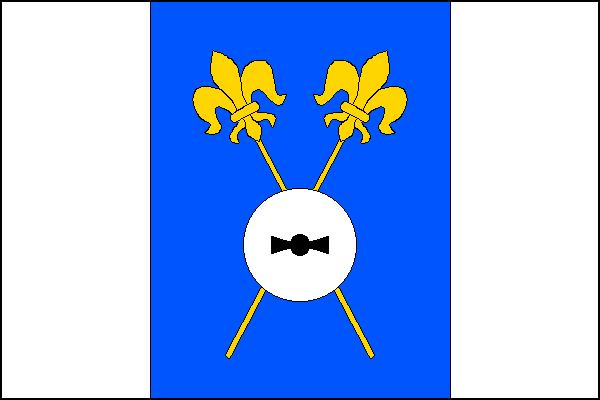
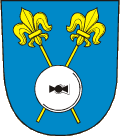
- Flag Coat of arms

- Location in the Czech Republic
- Coordinates: 49°54′46″N 18°9′21″E
- Country: Czech Republic
- Region: Moravian-Silesian
- District: Opava
- First mentioned: 1349

Area
  - Total: 10.87 km^{2} (4.20 sq mi)
- Elevation: 236 m (774 ft)

Population (2026-01-01)
  - Total: 1,896
  - Density: 174.4/km^{2} (451.8/sq mi)
- Time zone: UTC+1 (CET)
  - Summer (DST): UTC+2 (CEST)
- Postal code: 747 11
- Website: www.kozmice.cz

Kozmice (German: Kosmütz) is a municipality and village in Opava District in the Moravian-Silesian Region of the Czech Republic. It has about 1,900 inhabitants. It is part of the historic Hlučín Region.

== History ==
The first written mention of Kozmice is from 1349. On 1 July 1973, Kozmice became part of the town of Hlučín, but the municipality once again became independent on 1 January 1993.

== Demographics ==
Historical population
Year	Pop.	±%
1869	905	—
1880	912	+0.8%
1890	954	+4.6%
1900	1,007	+5.6%
1910	1,070	+6.3%
1921	1,113	+4.0%
1930	1,252	+12.5%
1950	1,306	+4.3%
1961	1,486	+13.8%
1970	1,611	+8.4%
1980	1,764	+9.5%
1991	1,815	+2.9%
2001	1,811	−0.2%
2011	1,761	−2.8%
2021	1,843	+4.7%
Source: Censuses
