= Píšť (Opava District) =

- Municipality
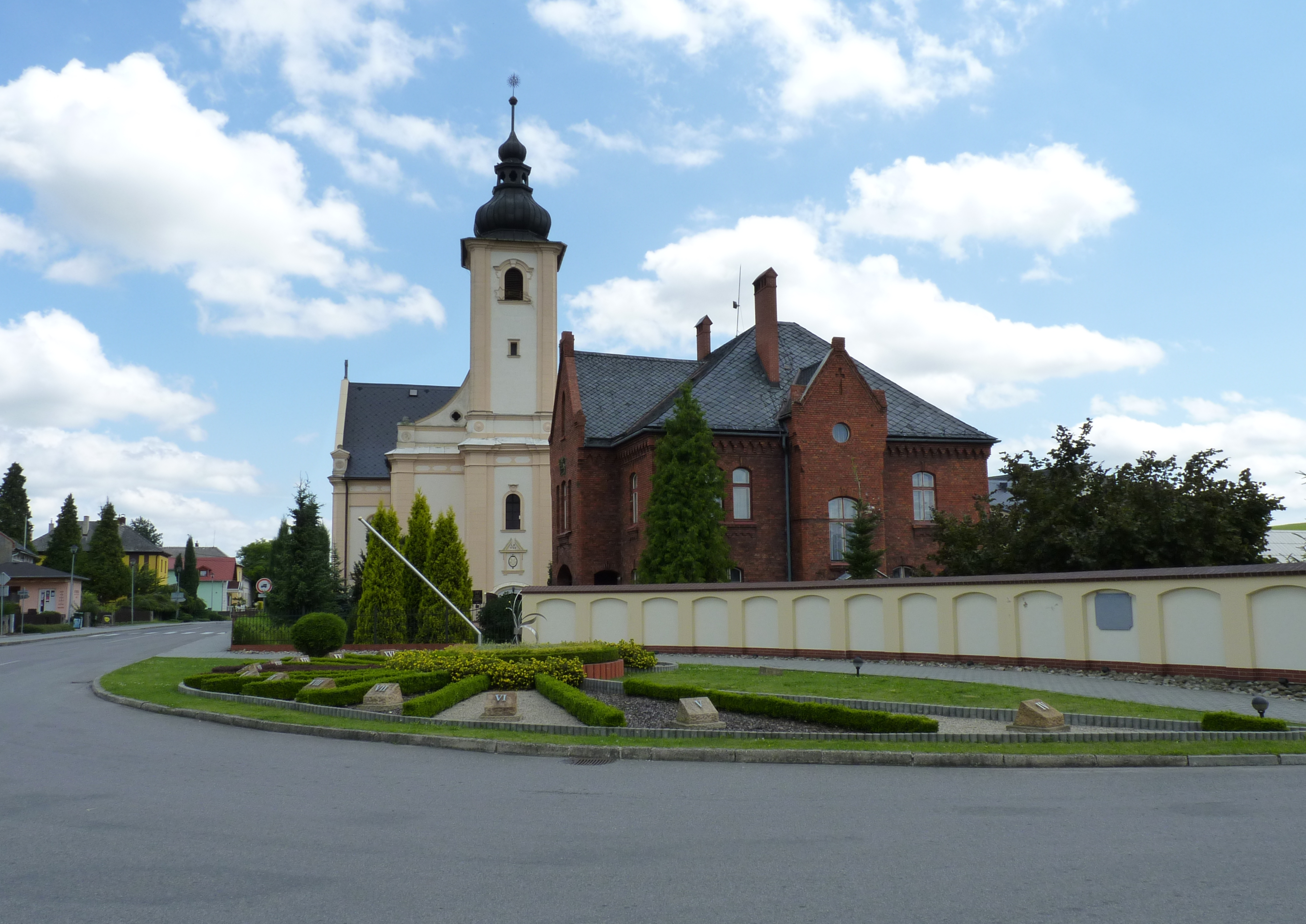
- Church of Saint Lawrence

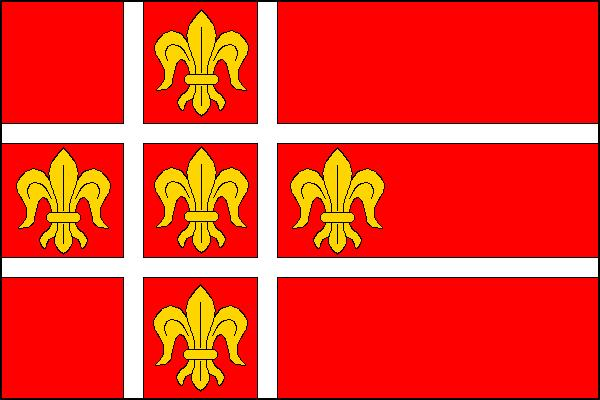
- Flag Coat of arms

- Location in the Czech Republic
- Coordinates: 49°58′43″N 18°11′37″E
- Country: Czech Republic
- Region: Moravian-Silesian
- District: Opava
- First mentioned: 1228

Area
  - Total: 15.68 km^{2} (6.05 sq mi)
- Elevation: 213 m (699 ft)

Population (2026-01-01)
  - Total: 2,115
  - Density: 134.9/km^{2} (349.4/sq mi)
- Time zone: UTC+1 (CET)
  - Summer (DST): UTC+2 (CEST)
- Postal code: 747 18
- Website: www.pist.cz

Píšť (German: Pyschcz) is a municipality and village in Opava District in the Moravian-Silesian Region of the Czech Republic. It has about 2,100 inhabitants. It is part of the historic Hlučín Region.

== Geography ==
Píšť is located about 20 kilometres (12 mi) east of Opava and 17 km (11 mi) north of Ostrava, on the border with Poland. It lies in the Opava Hilly Land. The highest point is at 279 m (915 ft) above sea level. The stream Píšťský potok flows through the municipality.

== History ==
The first written mention of Píšť is from 1228, when King Ottokar I donated the village to the monastery in Velehrad. The monastery owned Píšť until 1439. From 1518 to 1625, the village belonged to the Hlučín estate. In 1625, it was sold to the Lichnowsky family.

== Demographics ==
Historical population

Year	Pop.	±%
1869	1,270	—
1880	1,378	+8.5%
1890	1,503	+9.1%
1900	1,565	+4.1%
1910	1,629	+4.1%

Year	Pop.	±%
1921	1,761	+8.1%
1930	1,689	−4.1%
1950	1,693	+0.2%
1961	2,029	+19.8%
1970	2,075	+2.3%

Year	Pop.	±%
1980	2,097	+1.1%
1991	2,094	−0.1%
2001	2,097	+0.1%
2011	2,070	−1.3%
2021	2,011	−2.9%

Source: Censuses

== Transport ==
There are no railways or major roads passing through the municipality.

== Sights ==
The main landmark of Píšť is the Church of Saint Lawrence. It was built in 1743 and extended in 1903.
