= Ludgeřovice =

- Municipality
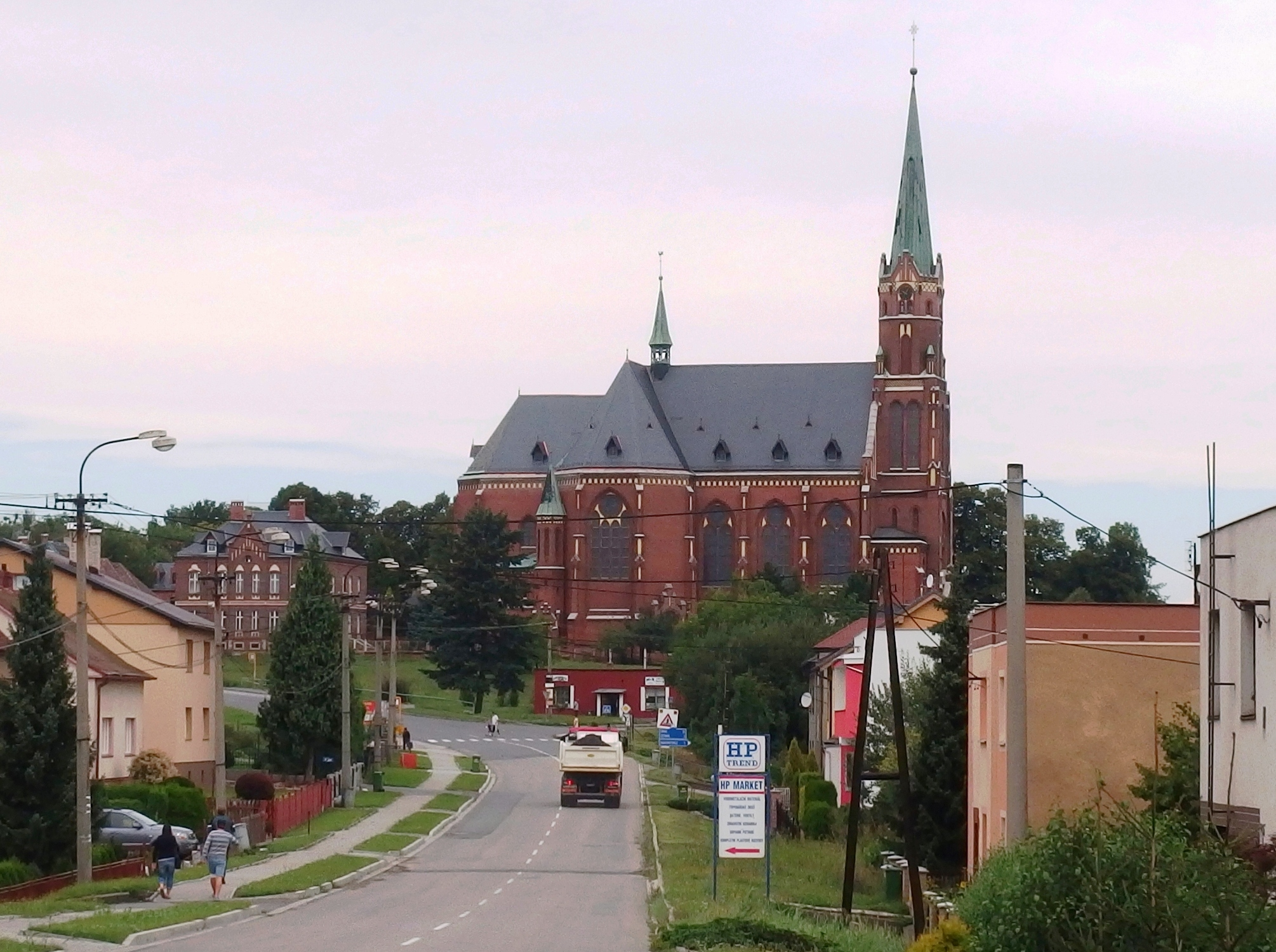
- Hlučínská street

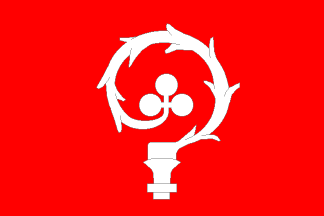
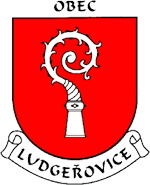
- Flag Coat of arms

- Location in the Czech Republic
- Coordinates: 49°55′19″N 18°6′28″E
- Country: Czech Republic
- Region: Moravian-Silesian
- District: Opava
- First mentioned: 1303

Area
  - Total: 10.83 km^{2} (4.18 sq mi)
- Elevation: 232 m (761 ft)

Population (2026-01-01)
  - Total: 4,959
  - Density: 457.9/km^{2} (1,186/sq mi)
- Time zone: UTC+1 (CET)
  - Summer (DST): UTC+2 (CEST)
- Postal code: 747 14
- Website: www.ludgerovice.cz

Ludgeřovice (Czech pronunciation: [ˈludɡɛr̝ovitsɛ]; German: Ludgierzowitz, Polish: Ludgierzowice) is a municipality and village in Opava District in the Moravian-Silesian Region of the Czech Republic. It has about 5,000 inhabitants, making it one of the most populous Czech municipalities without the town status. It is part of the historic Hlučín Region.

== Geography ==
Ludgeřovice is located about 24 kilometres (15 mi) east of Opava. It is urbanistically merged with the Petřkovice part of the city of Ostrava in the south and with Markvartovice in the north. It lies mostly in the Opava Hilly Land. The southern forested part of the municipal territory lies in the Nízký Jeseník range and includes the highest point of Ludgeřovice at 316 m (1,037 ft) above sea level.

== History ==
The first written mention of Ludgeřovice is from 1303.

== Demographics ==
Historical population

Year	Pop.	±%
1869	1,471	—
1880	1,699	+15.5%
1890	2,073	+22.0%
1900	2,566	+23.8%
1910	2,780	+8.3%

Year	Pop.	±%
1921	3,250	+16.9%
1930	3,916	+20.5%
1950	4,065	+3.8%
1961	4,544	+11.8%
1970	4,525	−0.4%

Year	Pop.	±%
1980	4,603	+1.7%
1991	4,505	−2.1%
2001	4,595	+2.0%
2011	4,650	+1.2%
2021	4,827	+3.8%

Source: Censuses

== Transport ==
The I/56 road from Ostrava to Opava runs through the municipality.

== Sights ==
The main landmark of Ludgeřovice is the Church of Saint Nicholas. It was built in 1906–1907.

== Notable people ==
- Vladimír Coufal (born 1992), footballer

== Twin towns – sister cities ==
Ludgeřovice is twinned with:

- Putnok, Hungary
- Tisovec, Slovakia
