= Štěpánkovice =

- Municipality
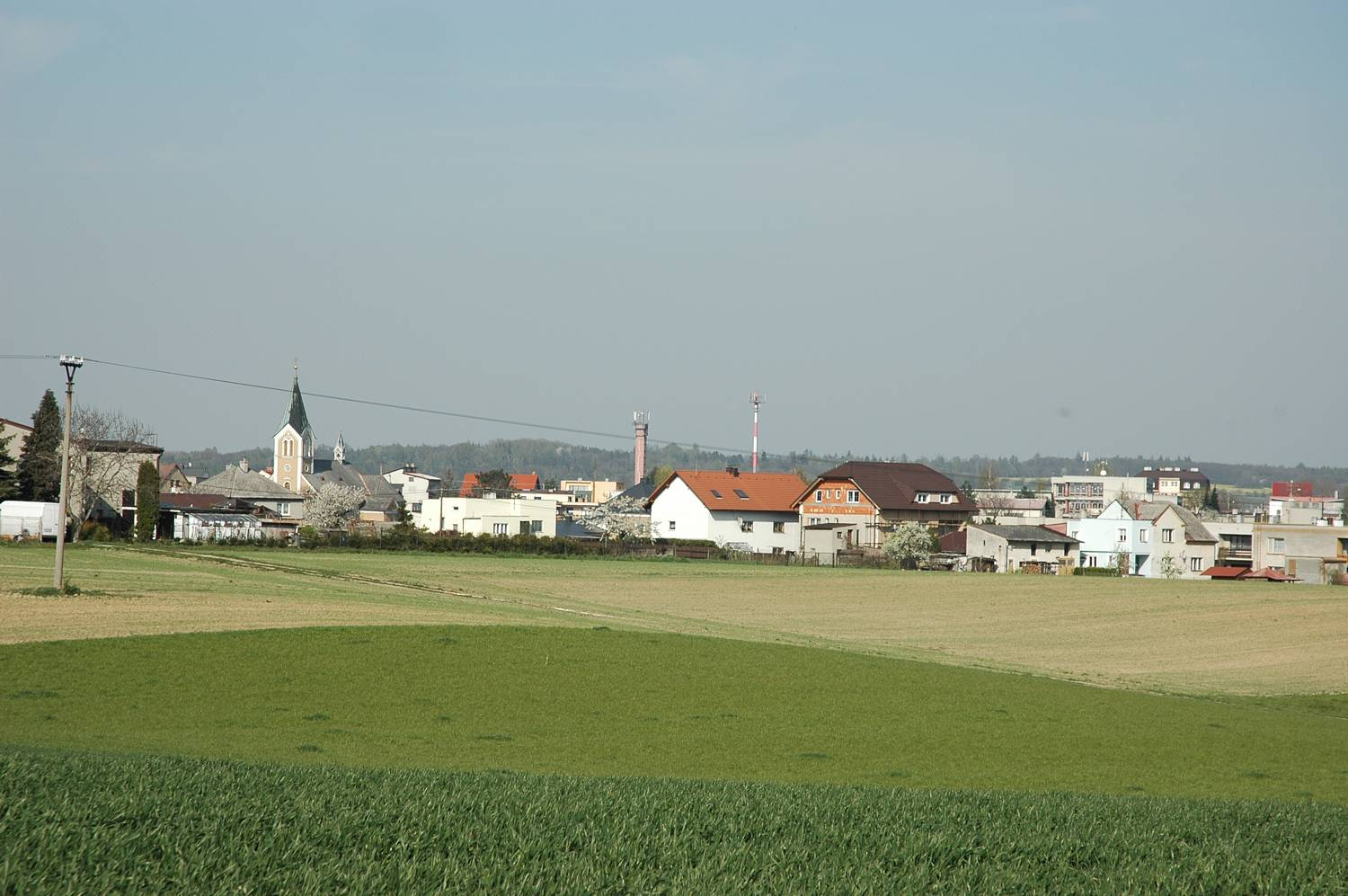
- View from the northeast

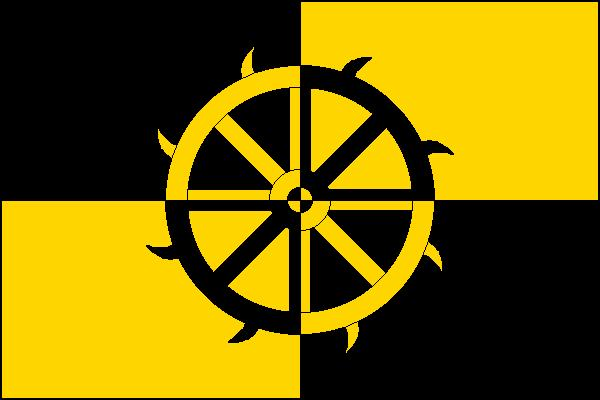
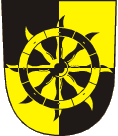
- Flag Coat of arms

- Location in the Czech Republic
- Coordinates: 49°57′27″N 18°2′15″E
- Country: Czech Republic
- Region: Moravian-Silesian
- District: Opava
- First mentioned: 1265

Area
  - Total: 12.53 km^{2} (4.84 sq mi)
- Elevation: 258 m (846 ft)

Population (2026-01-01)
  - Total: 3,154
  - Density: 251.7/km^{2} (651.9/sq mi)
- Time zone: UTC+1 (CET)
  - Summer (DST): UTC+2 (CEST)
- Postal code: 747 28
- Website: www.stepankovice.cz

Štěpánkovice (Czech pronunciation: [ˈʃcɛpaːnkovitsɛ]; German: Schepankowitz) is a municipality and village in Opava District in the Moravian-Silesian Region of the Czech Republic. It has about 3,200 inhabitants. It is part of the historic Hlučín Region.

== Administrative division ==
Štěpánkovice consists of three municipal parts (in brackets population according to the 2021 census):

- Štěpánkovice (2,773)
- Bílá Bříza (65)
- Svoboda (227)

== Geography ==
Štěpánkovice is located about 9 kilometres (6 mi) east of Opava and 21 km (13 mi) northwest of Ostrava. It lies in an agricultural landscape in the Opava Hilly Land. The highest point is at 313 m (1,027 ft) above sea level.

== History ==
The first written mention of Štěpánkovice is from 1265. In 1712, it was bought by the Lichnowsky family. Until 1742, the village belonged to Duchy of Troppau. From 1742 to 1918, after Empress Maria Theresa had been defeated, the village belonged to Prussia. In 1920, it became part of the newly established Czechoslovakia. During World War II, on 16 April 1945, Štěpánkovice was badly damaged and many buildings burned down.

== Demographics ==
Historical population

| Year | Pop. | ±% |
|---|---|---|
| 1869 | 1,237 | — |
| 1880 | 1,234 | −0.2% |
| 1890 | 1,476 | +19.6% |
| 1900 | 1,669 | +13.1% |
| 1910 | 1,730 | +3.7% |

| Year | Pop. | ±% |
|---|---|---|
| 1921 | 1,872 | +8.2% |
| 1930 | 2,127 | +13.6% |
| 1950 | 1,900 | −10.7% |
| 1961 | 2,535 | +33.4% |
| 1970 | 2,571 | +1.4% |

| Year | Pop. | ±% |
|---|---|---|
| 1980 | 2,820 | +9.7% |
| 1991 | 2,953 | +4.7% |
| 2001 | 3,042 | +3.0% |
| 2011 | 3,060 | +0.6% |
| 2021 | 3,065 | +0.2% |

Source: Censuses

== Transport ==
Štěpánkovice is located on a short railway line of local importance Kravaře–Chuchelná.

== Sights ==
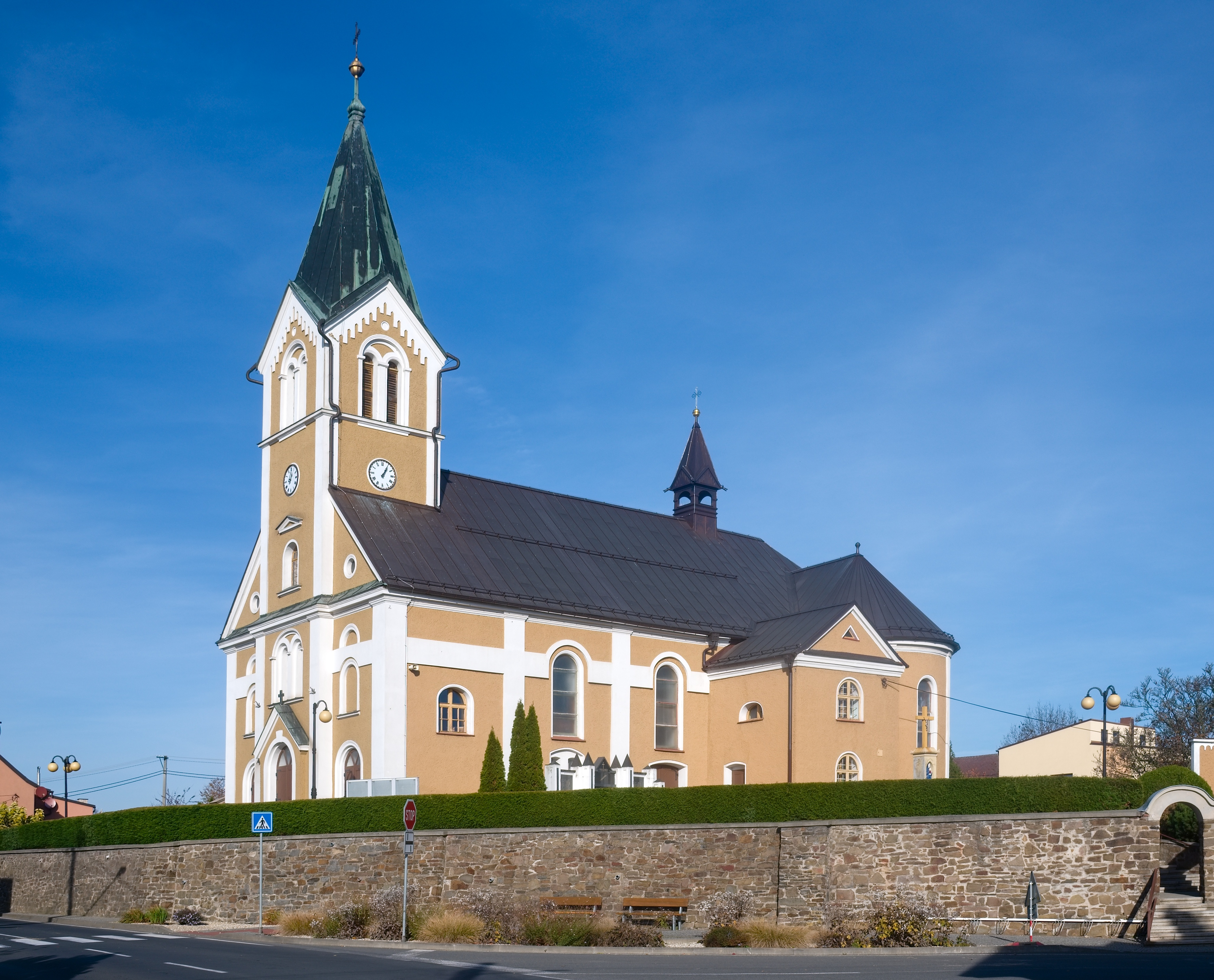
Church of Saint Catherine

The only protected cultural monument in the municipality is a granary from the first half of the 19th century. It is among the few preserved folk farm buildings of this type in the Hlučín Region.

The main landmark of Štěpánkovice is the Church of Saint Catherine. It was built in 1756 and reconstructed after war damage in 1945.

== Notable people ==
- Filip Souček (born 2000), footballer

== Twin towns – sister cities ==
Štěpánkovice is twinned with:

- Štrba, Slovakia
