= Závada (Opava District) =

- Municipality
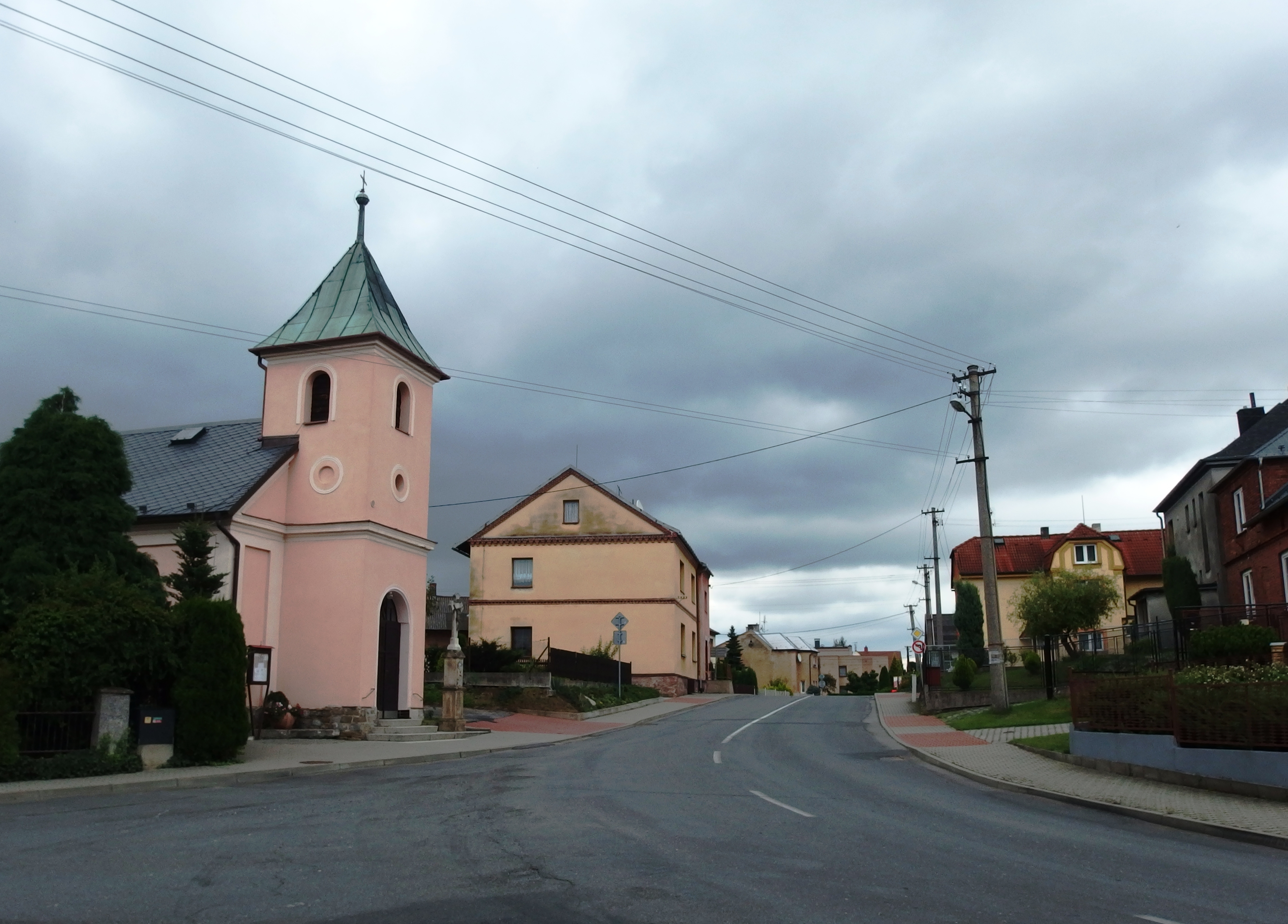
- Centre of Závada

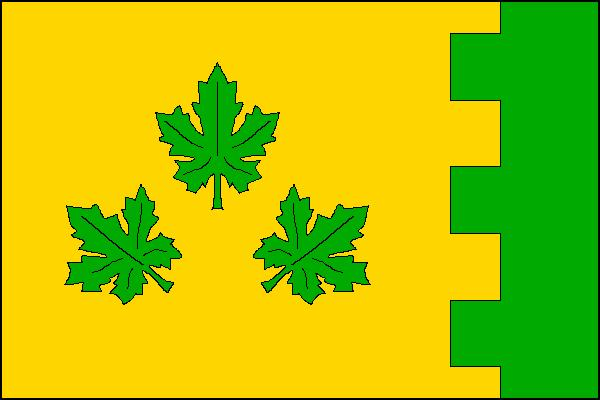
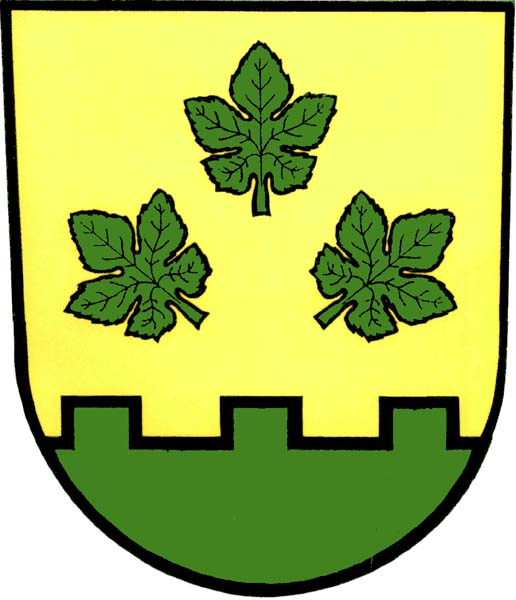
- Flag Coat of arms

- Location in the Czech Republic
- Coordinates: 49°59′29″N 17°57′39″E
- Country: Czech Republic
- Region: Moravian-Silesian
- District: Opava
- First mentioned: 1349

Area
  - Total: 5.27 km^{2} (2.03 sq mi)
- Elevation: 262 m (860 ft)

Population (2026-01-01)
  - Total: 624
  - Density: 118/km^{2} (307/sq mi)
- Time zone: UTC+1 (CET)
  - Summer (DST): UTC+2 (CEST)
- Postal code: 747 19
- Website: www.zavada.cz

Závada (German: Zawada bei Beneschau, Polish: Zawada) is a municipality and village in Opava District in the Moravian-Silesian Region of the Czech Republic. It has about 600 inhabitants. It is part of the historic Hlučín Region.

== History ==
The first written mention of Závada is from 1349.

== Demographics ==
Historical population
Year	Pop.	±%
1869	379	—
1880	378	−0.3%
1890	419	+10.8%
1900	415	−1.0%
1910	448	+8.0%
1921	461	+2.9%
1930	424	−8.0%
1950	406	−4.2%
1961	515	+26.8%
1970	521	+1.2%
1980	572	+9.8%
1991	564	−1.4%
2001	576	+2.1%
2011	574	−0.3%
2021	573	−0.2%
Source: Censuses
