= Hlučín-Darkovičky Czechoslovak Fortification Complex =

- Areál československého opevnění Hlučín-Darkovičky
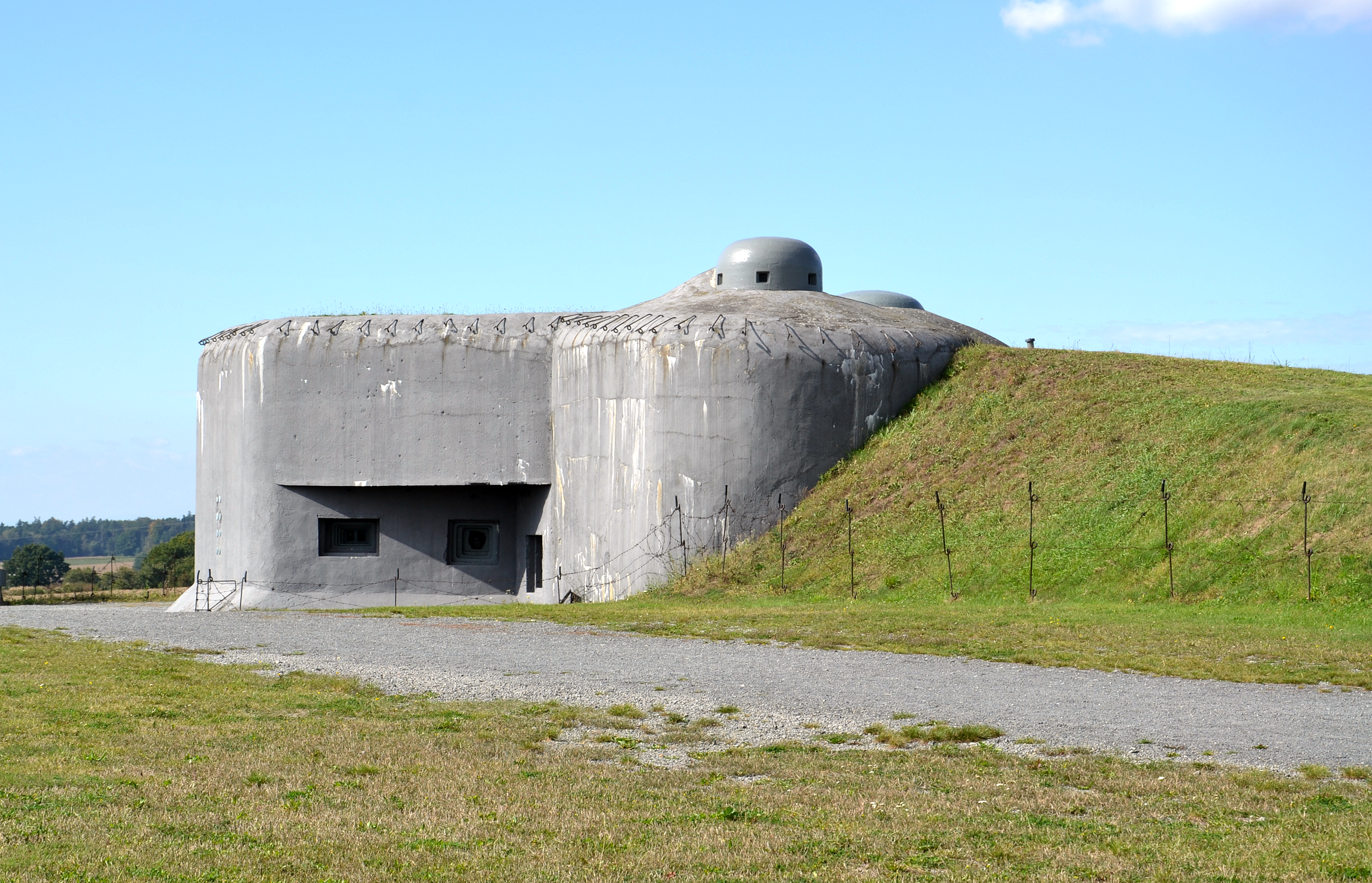

General information
- Location: Hlučín
- Country: Czech Republic
- Coordinates: 49°55′30.72″N 18°13′16.68″E

Website
- https://www.szm.cz/rubrika/41/expozicni-arealy/areal-cs-opevneni-hlucin-darkovicky.html

The Hlučín-Darkovičky Czechoslovak Fortification Complex (Czech: Areál československého opevnění Hlučín-Darkovičky) is an exhibition of 1930's military fortifications in Hlučín-Darkovičky, Czech Republic.

The forts MO S-18 "Obora", MO S-19 "Alej" and MO S-20 "Orel" are parts of the exhibition. They are part of a series of five different fortifications that were designed to sit on the Czech border during the first half of the 20th century. They are an important example of the defences available during the World War II and the consequences of the Munich Agreement. The fortification complex has been under the management of the Silesian Museum in Opava since 1992.

== See also ==
- Hlučín Region
- Czechoslovak border fortifications
