= Služovice =

- Municipality
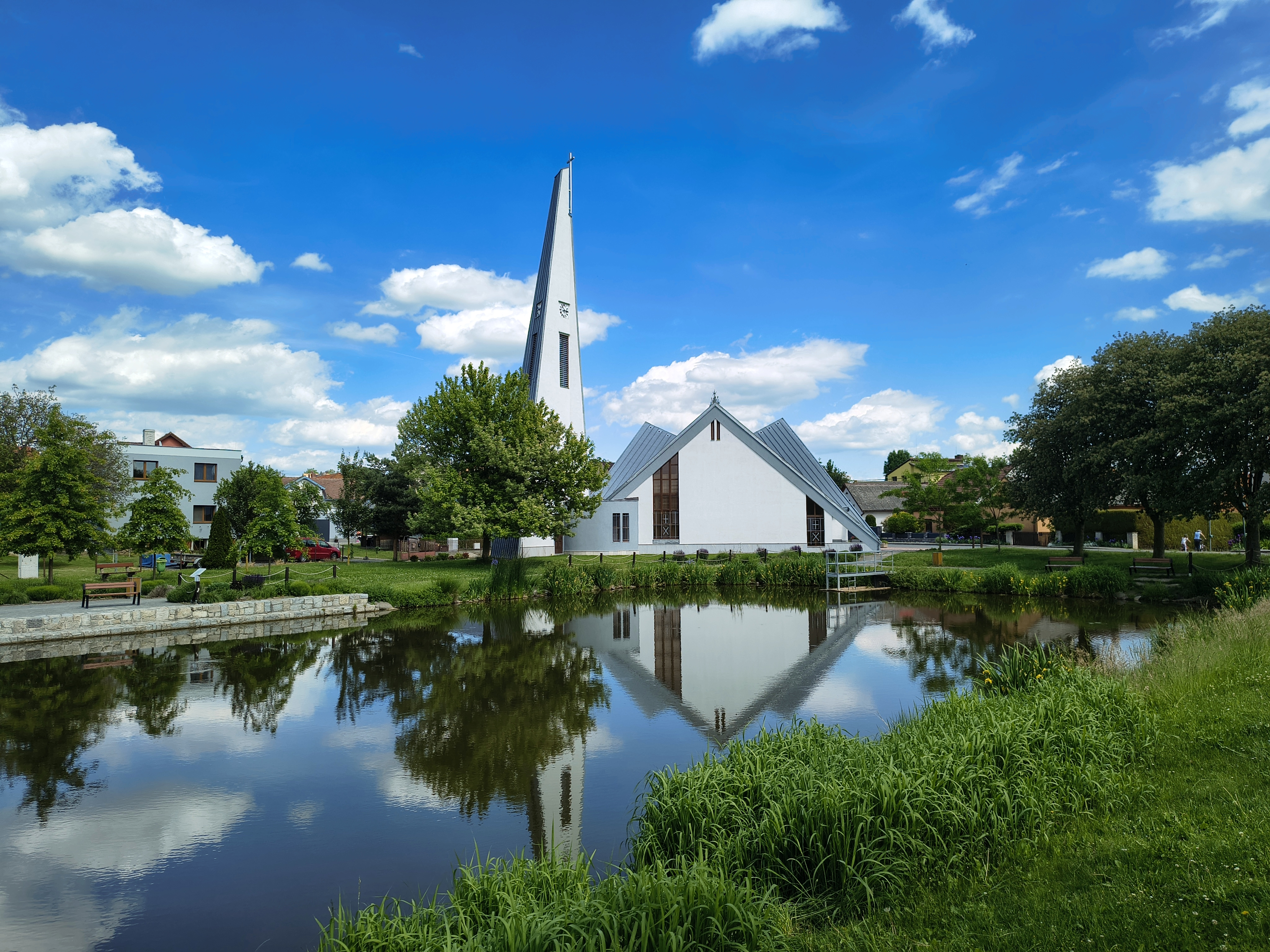
- Fire reservoir and Chapel of the Assumption of the Virgin Mary

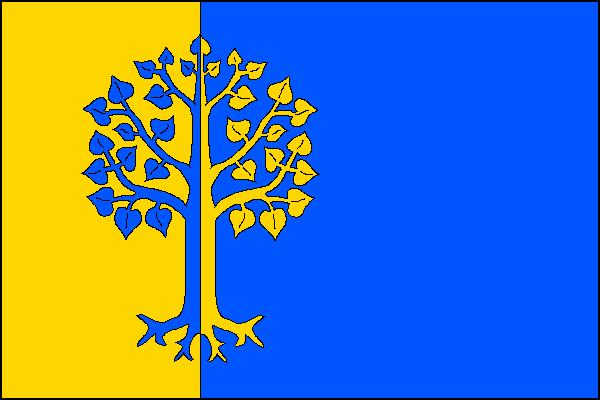
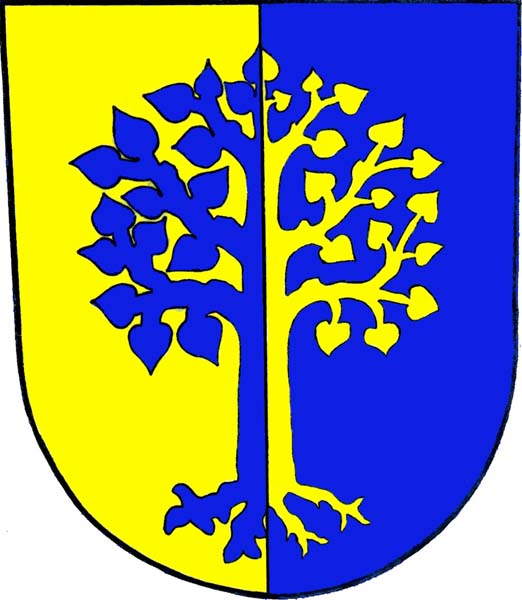
- Flag Coat of arms

- Location in the Czech Republic
- Coordinates: 49°59′19″N 17°59′42″E
- Country: Czech Republic
- Region: Moravian-Silesian
- District: Opava
- First mentioned: 1349

Area
  - Total: 5.99 km^{2} (2.31 sq mi)
- Elevation: 269 m (883 ft)

Population (2026-01-01)
  - Total: 852
  - Density: 142/km^{2} (368/sq mi)
- Time zone: UTC+1 (CET)
  - Summer (DST): UTC+2 (CEST)
- Postal code: 747 28
- Website: www.sluzovice.cz

Služovice (German: Schlausewitz) is a municipality and village in Opava District in the Moravian-Silesian Region of the Czech Republic. It has about 900 inhabitants. It is part of the historic Hlučín Region.

== Administrative division ==
Služovice consists of two municipal parts (in brackets population according to the 2021 census):

- Služovice (683)
- Vrbka (127)

== History ==
The first written mention of Služovice is from 1349. The municipalities of Služovice and Vrbka were merged in 1979.

== Demographics ==
Historical population
Year	Pop.	±%
1869	543	—
1880	536	−1.3%
1890	536	+0.0%
1900	511	−4.7%
1910	530	+3.7%
1921	556	+4.9%
1930	490	−11.9%
1950	465	−5.1%
1961	549	+18.1%
1970	631	+14.9%
1980	734	+16.3%
1991	766	+4.4%
2001	814	+6.3%
2011	790	−2.9%
2021	810	+2.5%
Source: Censuses
