= Markvartovice =

- Municipality
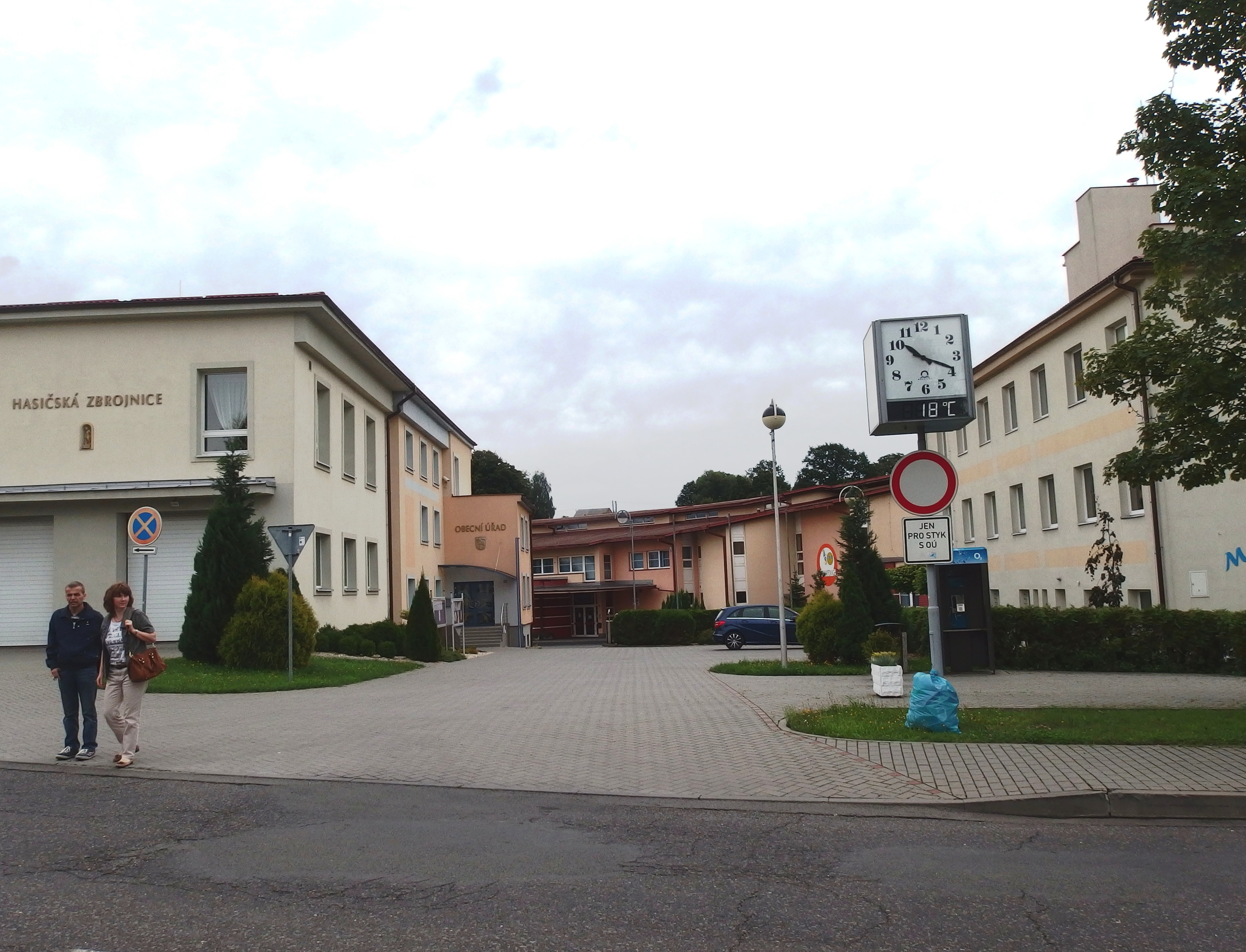
- Centre of Markvartovice with the municipal office

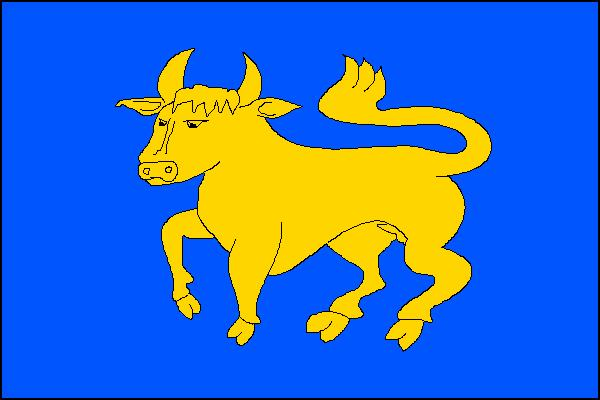
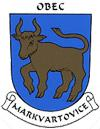
- Flag Coat of arms

- Location in the Czech Republic
- Coordinates: 49°54′35″N 18°14′2″E
- Country: Czech Republic
- Region: Moravian-Silesian
- District: Opava
- First mentioned: 1377

Area
  - Total: 6.78 km^{2} (2.62 sq mi)
- Elevation: 238 m (781 ft)

Population (2026-01-01)
  - Total: 2,219
  - Density: 327/km^{2} (848/sq mi)
- Time zone: UTC+1 (CET)
  - Summer (DST): UTC+2 (CEST)
- Postal code: 747 14
- Website: www.markvartovice.cz

Markvartovice (German: Markersdorf) is a municipality and village in Opava District in the Moravian-Silesian Region of the Czech Republic. It has about 2,200 inhabitants. It is part of the historic Hlučín Region.

== Geography ==
Markvartovice is located about 8 kilometres (5 mi) north of Ostrava. It lies in the Opava Hilly Land. The highest point is at 281 m (922 ft) above sea level. The stream Ludgeřovický potok flows through the municipality.

== History ==
The first written mention of Markvartovice is from 1377, when it was owned by Rosat, a forester of the Opava princes. Until 1551, the village was a seat of the Bzenec knights. Then the village often changed owners until 1673, when it became the property of the Jesuits from Opava. Their reckless reign led to an uprising of the inhabintants in 1734. From 1742 to 1918, after Maria Theresa had been defeated, the village belonged to Prussia. In 1920, it became part of the newly established Czechoslovakia.

== Demographics ==
Historical population

Year	Pop.	±%
1869	650	—
1880	806	+24.0%
1890	901	+11.8%
1900	955	+6.0%
1910	1,059	+10.9%

Year	Pop.	±%
1921	1,204	+13.7%
1930	1,335	+10.9%
1950	1,288	−3.5%
1961	1,539	+19.5%
1970	1,562	+1.5%

Year	Pop.	±%
1980	1,692	+8.3%
1991	1,691	−0.1%
2001	1,770	+4.7%
2011	1,826	+3.2%
2021	2,121	+16.2%

Source: Censuses

== Transport ==
The I/56 road (heading from Ostrava to Hlučín and Opava) briefly crosses the southern part of the municipal territory.

== Sights ==
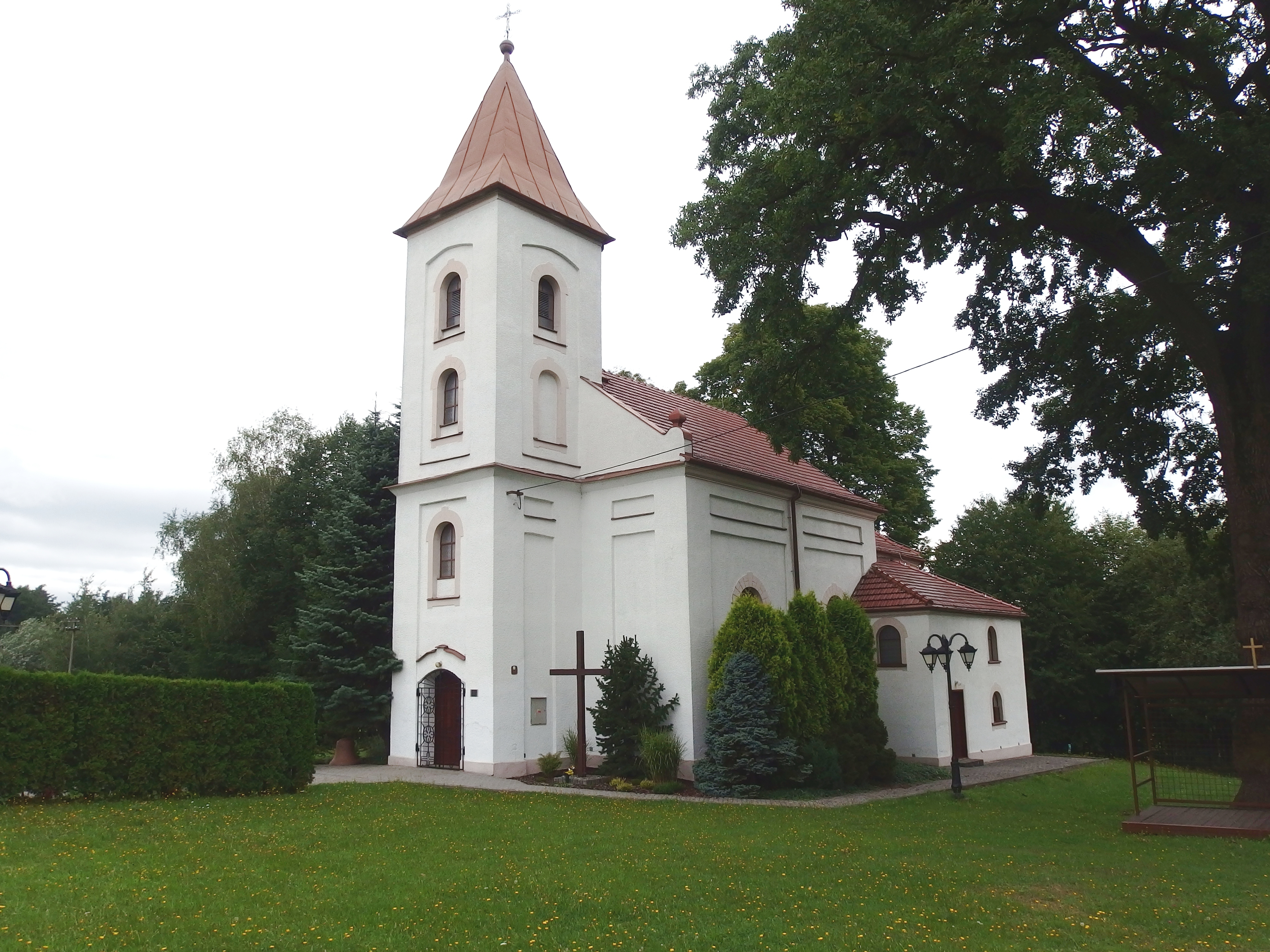
Chapel of the Holy Trinity

The most significant monument in Markvartovice is the Chapel of the Holy Trinity. It is an early Baroque building from the second half of the 17th century.

== Notable people ==
- Jaromír Bohačík (born 1992), basketball player; raised here and lives here
