= Chlebičov =

- Municipality
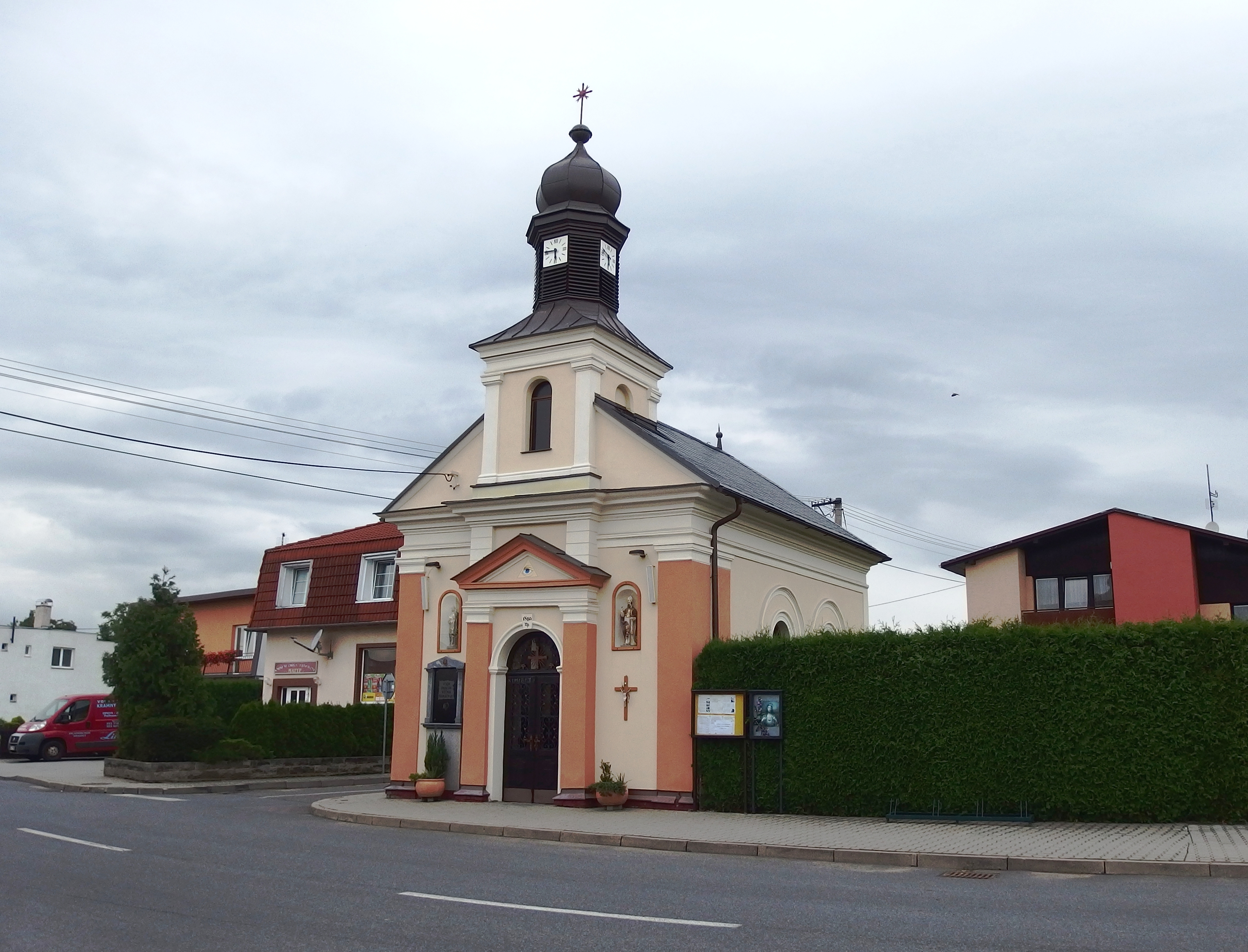
- Chapel of Our Lady of the Rosary

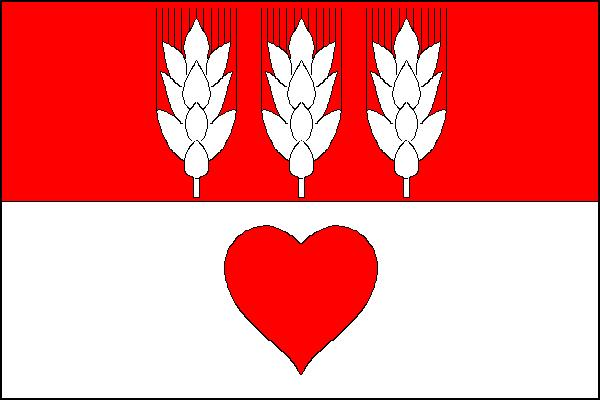
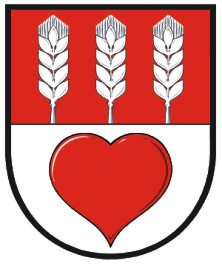
- Flag Coat of arms

- Location in the Czech Republic
- Coordinates: 49°57′34″N 17°58′3″E
- Country: Czech Republic
- Region: Moravian-Silesian
- District: Opava
- First mentioned: 1250

Area
  - Total: 3.62 km^{2} (1.40 sq mi)
- Elevation: 275 m (902 ft)

Population (2026-01-01)
  - Total: 1,188
  - Density: 328/km^{2} (850/sq mi)
- Time zone: UTC+1 (CET)
  - Summer (DST): UTC+2 (CEST)
- Postal code: 747 32
- Website: www.chlebicov.cz

Chlebičov (German: Klebsch) is a municipality and village in Opava District in the Moravian-Silesian Region of the Czech Republic. It has about 1,200 inhabitants. It is part of the historic Hlučín Region.

== History ==
The first written mention of Chlebičov is from 1250. From 1742 to 1918, after Empress Maria Theresa had been defeated, the village belonged to Prussia. In 1920, the municipality became a part of Czechoslovakia. Between 1979 and 1990, Chlebičov was a municipal part of Velké Hoštice. Since 1990, it has been a separate municipality.

== Demographics ==
Historical population
Year	Pop.	±%
1869	537	—
1880	557	+3.7%
1890	572	+2.7%
1900	602	+5.2%
1910	620	+3.0%
1921	669	+7.9%
1930	659	−1.5%
1950	728	+10.5%
1961	1,026	+40.9%
1970	986	−3.9%
1980	1,026	+4.1%
1991	1,049	+2.2%
2001	1,069	+1.9%
2011	1,059	−0.9%
2021	1,157	+9.3%
Source: Censuses

== Twin towns – sister cities ==
Chlebičov is twinned with:

- Liptovské Revúce, Slovakia
