= Třebom =

- Municipality
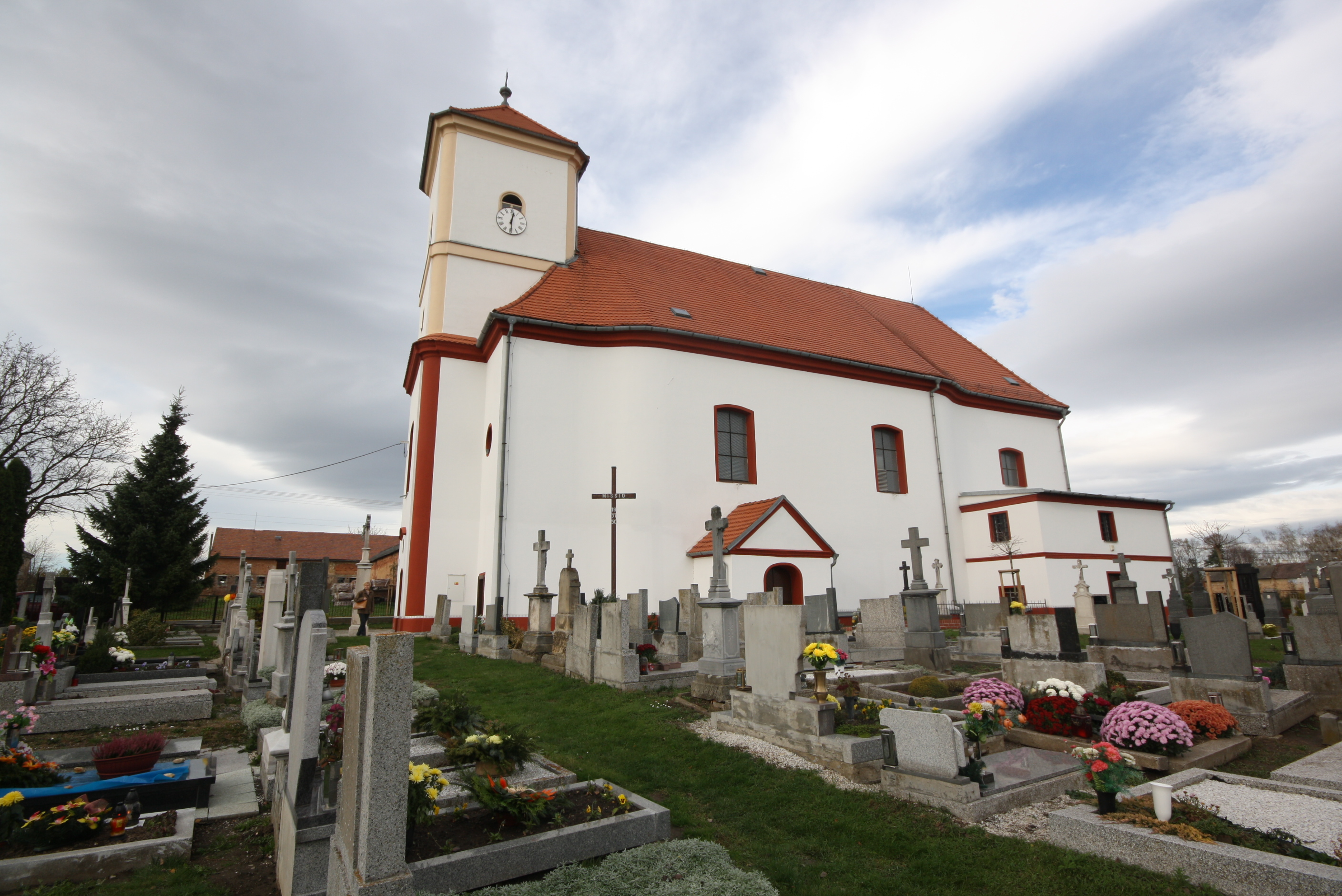
- Church of Saint George

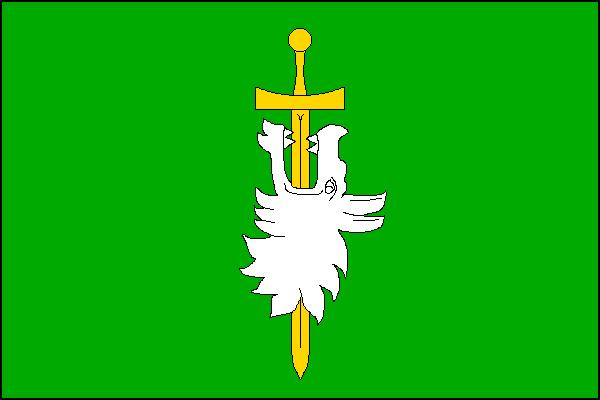
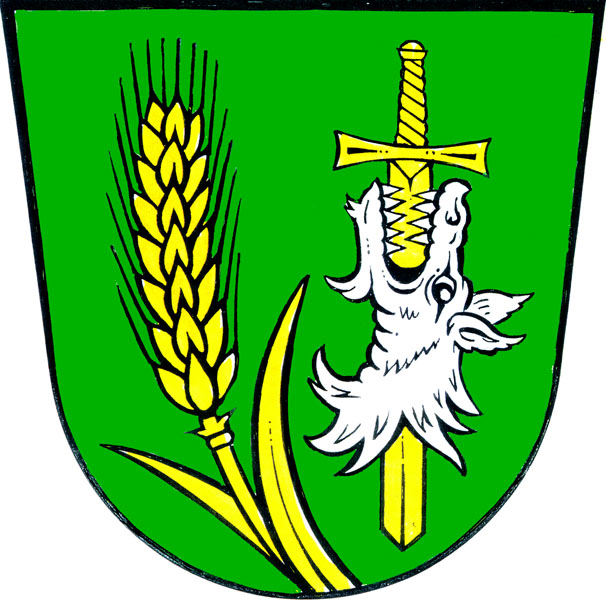
- Flag Coat of arms

- Location in the Czech Republic
- Coordinates: 50°2′46″N 18°1′31″E
- Country: Czech Republic
- Region: Moravian-Silesian
- District: Opava
- First mentioned: 1349

Area
  - Total: 9.51 km^{2} (3.67 sq mi)
- Elevation: 226 m (741 ft)

Population (2026-01-01)
  - Total: 191
  - Density: 20.1/km^{2} (52.0/sq mi)
- Time zone: UTC+1 (CET)
  - Summer (DST): UTC+2 (CEST)
- Postal code: 747 25
- Website: www.trebom.cz

Třebom (German: Thröm) is a municipality and village in Opava District in the Moravian-Silesian Region of the Czech Republic. It has about 200 inhabitants. It is part of the historic Hlučín Region.

== Geography ==
Třebom is located about 14 kilometres (9 mi) northeast of Opava and 29 km (18 mi) northwest of Ostrava, on the border with Poland. It lies in a flat agricultural landscape in the Opava Hilly Land. The highest point is at 253 m (830 ft) above sea level.

== History ==
The first written mention of Třebom is from 1349. Until 1582, the village was owned by various lower nobles. In 1582, it was acquired by the Lords of Vrbno, who owned it until 1621, when their property was confiscated. From 1621 to 1863, Třebom was owned by the Teutonic Order.

In 1920, together with the Hlučín Region, Třebom became part of Czechoslovakia and was the only municipality in this region where the population was ethnically pure German. After World War II, most of the German-speaking population was expelled.

== Demographics ==
Historical population

Year	Pop.	±%
1869	1,018	—
1880	986	−3.1%
1890	928	−5.9%
1900	961	+3.6%
1910	902	−6.1%

Year	Pop.	±%
1921	760	−15.7%
1930	752	−1.1%
1950	367	−51.2%
1961	430	+17.2%
1970	359	−16.5%

Year	Pop.	±%
1980	286	−20.3%
1991	213	−25.5%
2001	203	−4.7%
2011	206	+1.5%
2021	221	+7.3%

Source: Censuses

== Transport ==
In the municipality is the road border crossing with Poland Třebom / Kietrz.

== Sights ==
There are no protected cultural monuments in the municipality. The main landmark of Třebom is the Church of Saint George. It was built in 1781–1785.
