= Hošťálkovice =

Borough of Ostrava, Czech Republic

- Borough of Ostrava
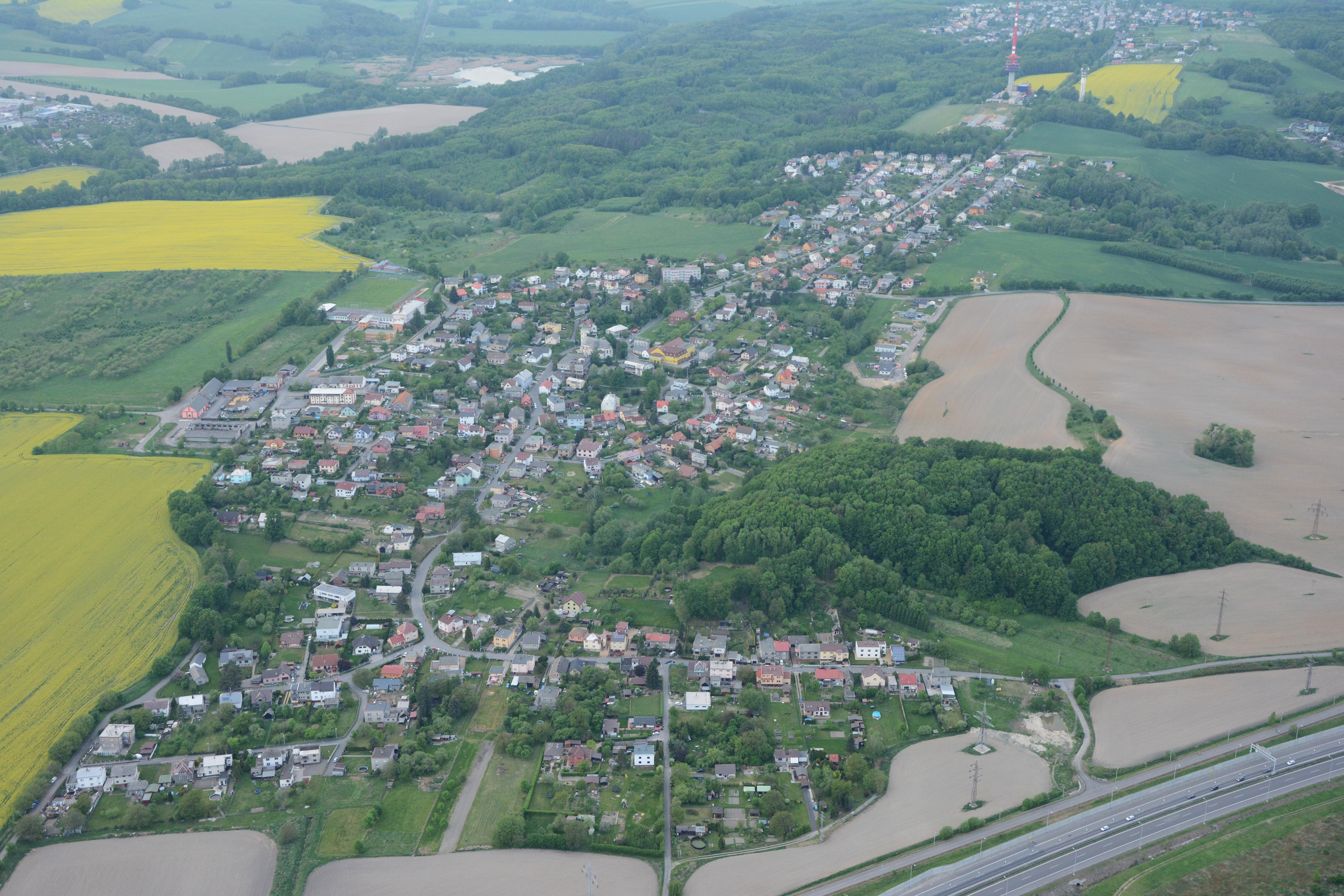
- Areal view of Hošťálkovice

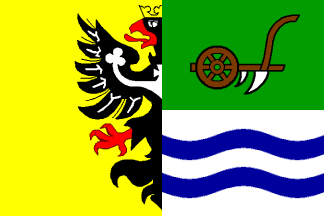
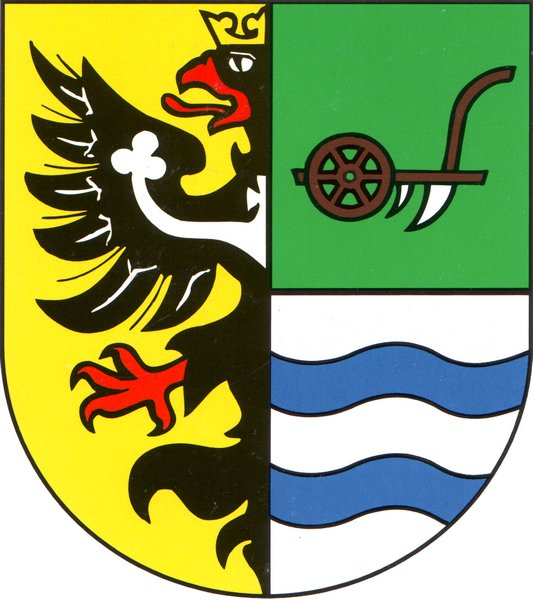
- Flag Coat of arms

- Location of Hošťálkovice in Ostrava
- Coordinates: 49°50′49″N 18°12′54″E
- Country: Czech Republic
- Region: Moravian-Silesian
- Municipality: Ostrava

Area
  - Total: 5.30 km^{2} (2.05 sq mi)

Population (2021)
  - Total: 1,683
  - Density: 318/km^{2} (822/sq mi)
- Time zone: UTC+1 (CET)
  - Summer (DST): UTC+2 (CEST)
- Postal code: 725 28
- Website: hostalkovice.ostrava.cz

Hošťálkovice is a borough and municipal part of the city of Ostrava in the Czech Republic. It is situated in the northern part of the city, above the confluence of Oder and Opava rivers, on their left bank. Originally, it was a separate municipality, until it merged with Ostrava in April 1976. On 24 November 1990, it became one of the 23 self-governing boroughs of Ostrava.

== Etymology ==
The name is derived from the German given name Gottschalk, meaning 'God's servant'. The name was later adapted into Czech as Hoščálek or Hošťálek, and by adding the possessive suffix -ovice, it became Hošťálkovice, meaning "Hošťálek's settlement".

== Gallery ==
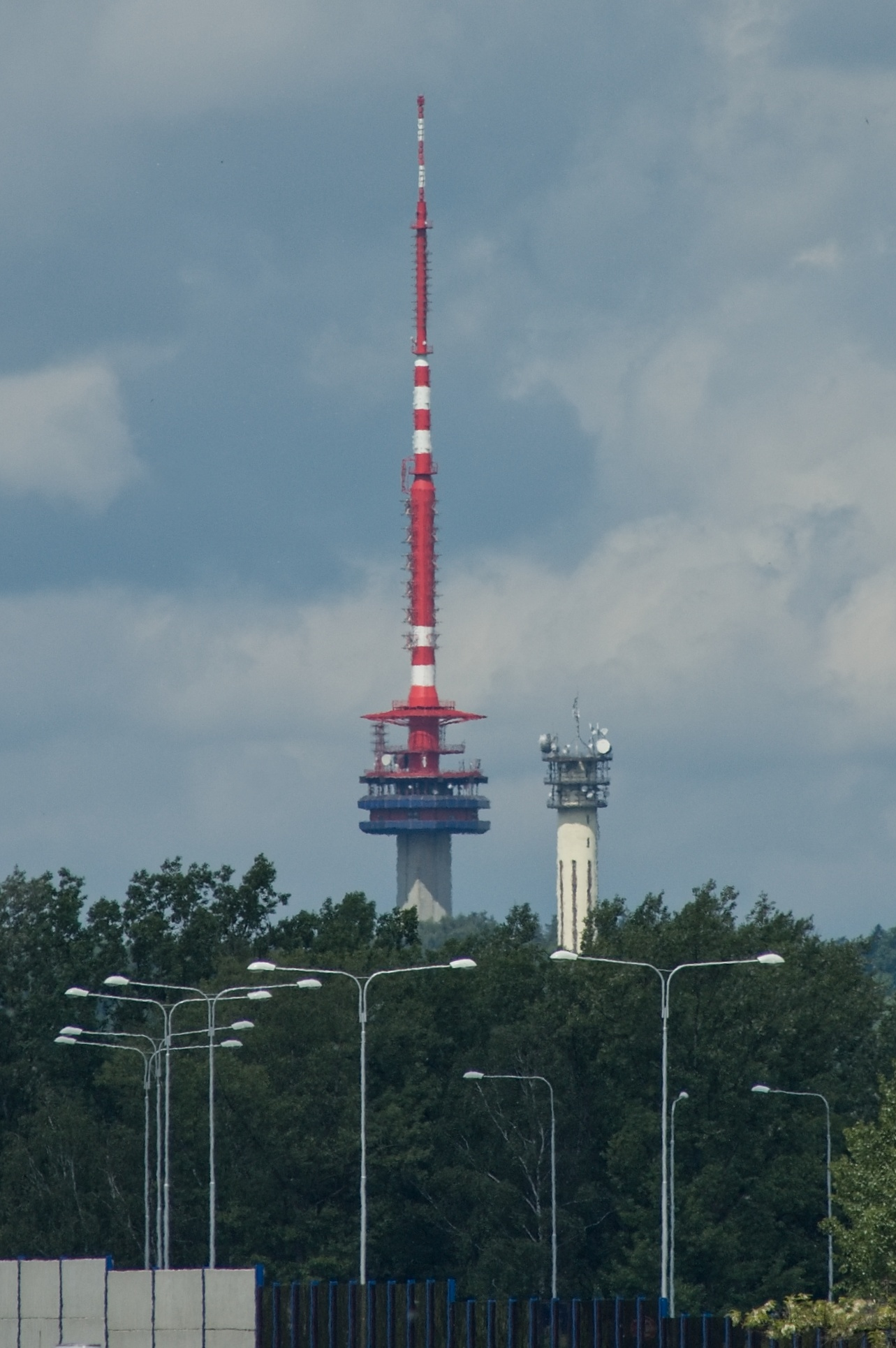
Hošťálkovice television and radio tower

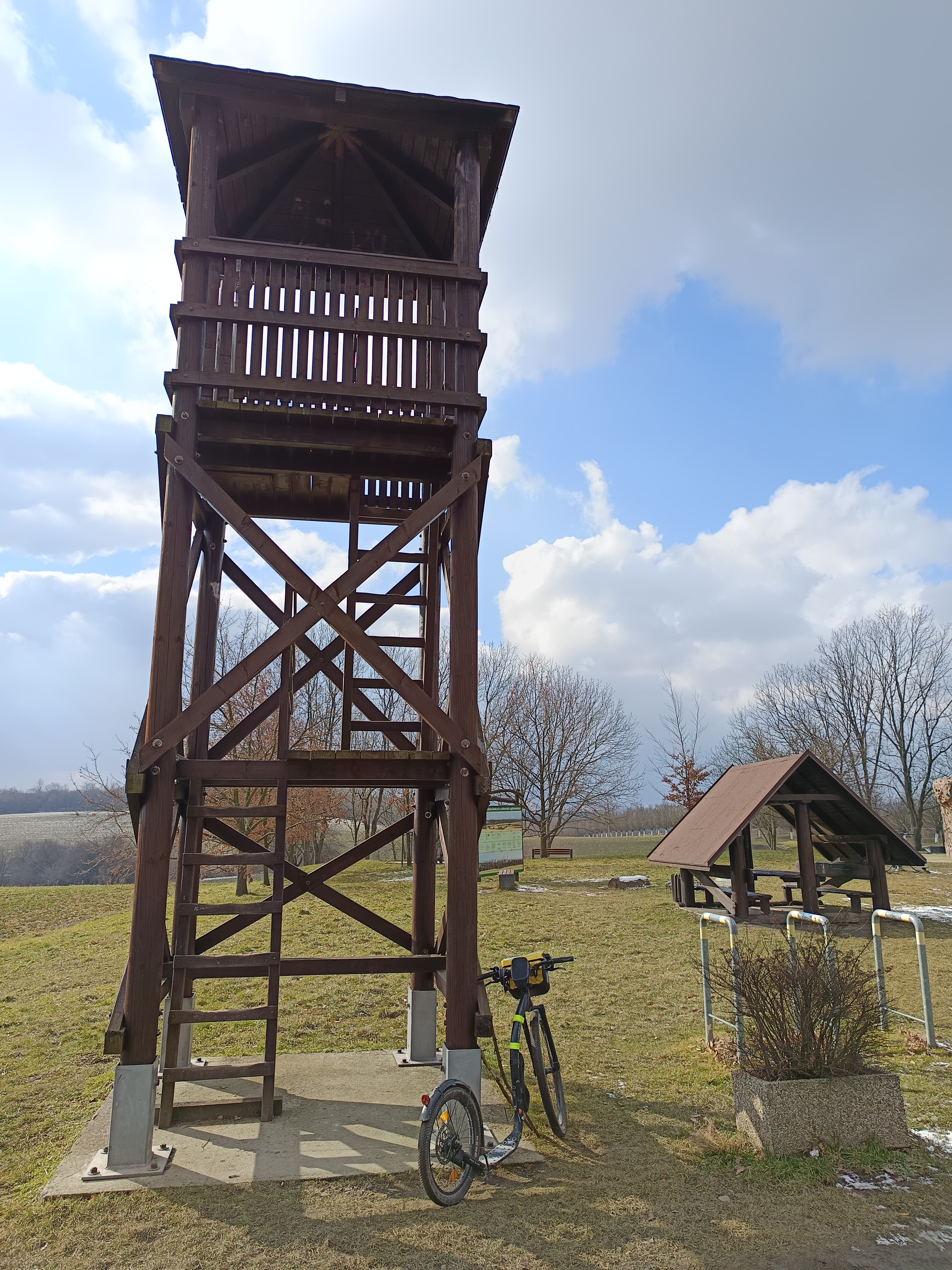
Hošťálkovice observation tower

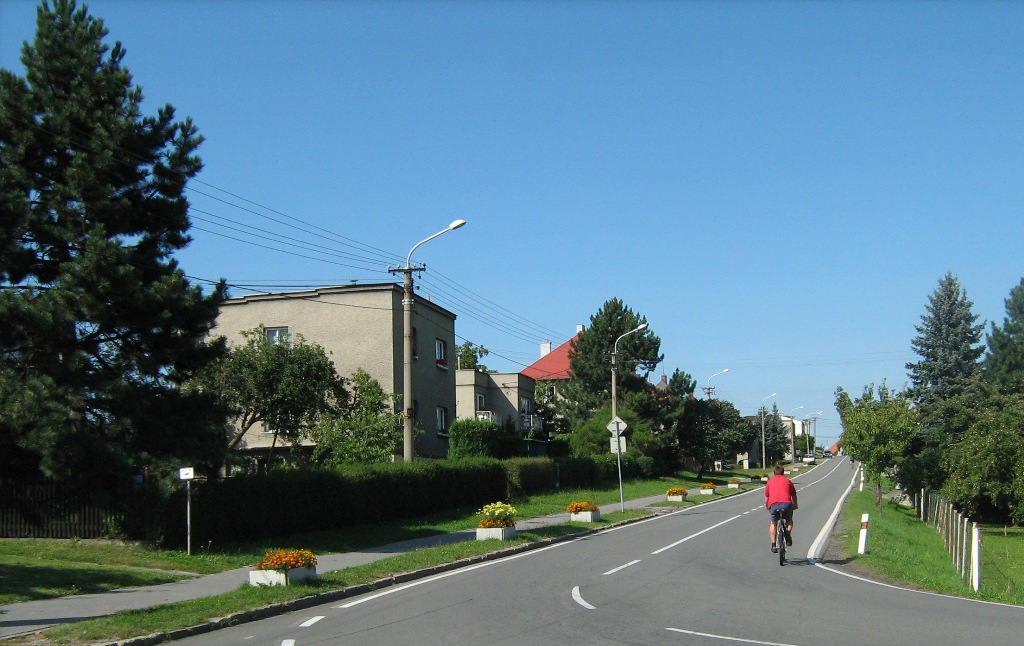
Main street

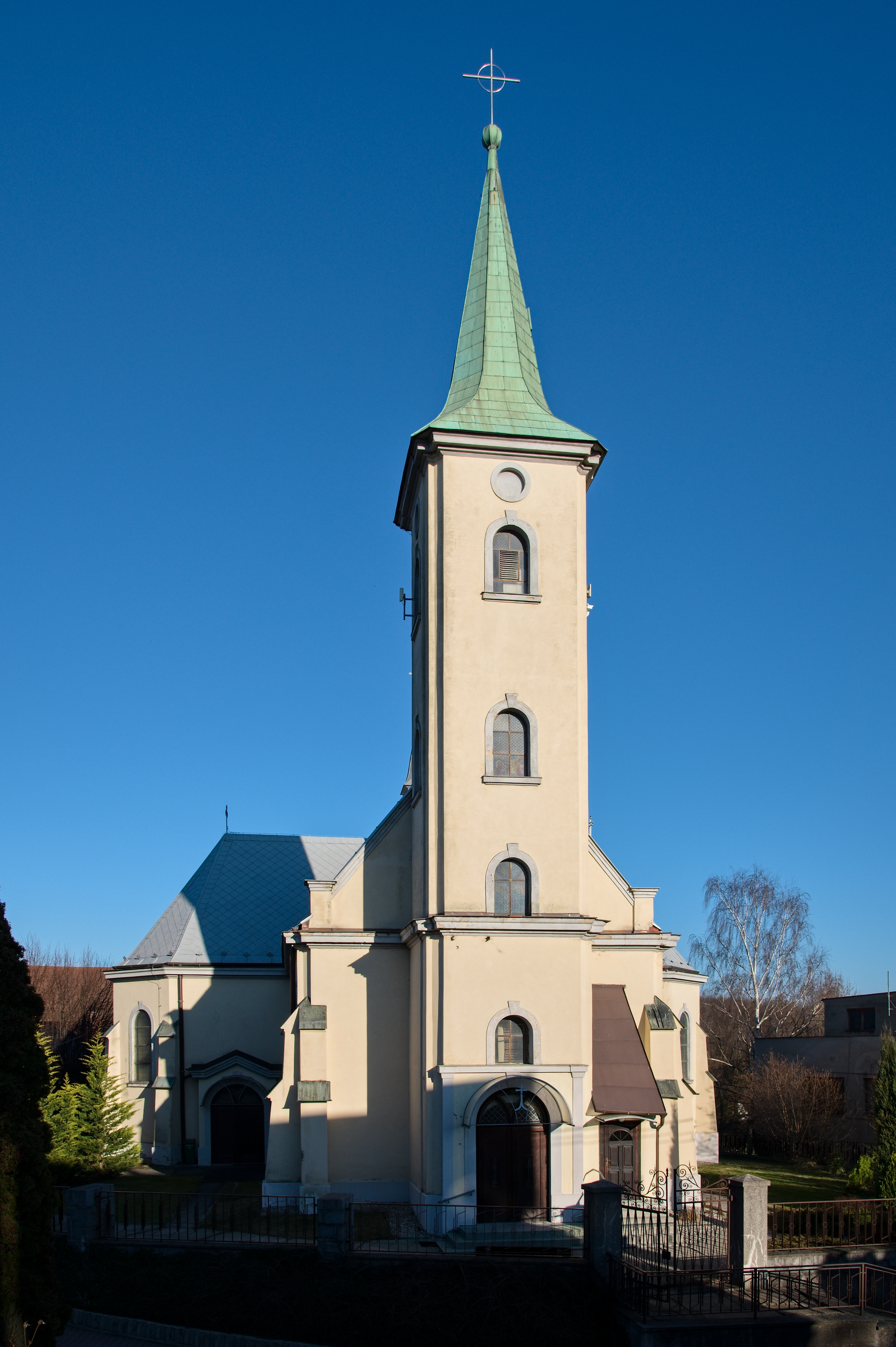
Church of All Saints
