= Lhotka (Ostrava) =

Borough of Ostrava, Czech Republic

- Borough of Ostrava
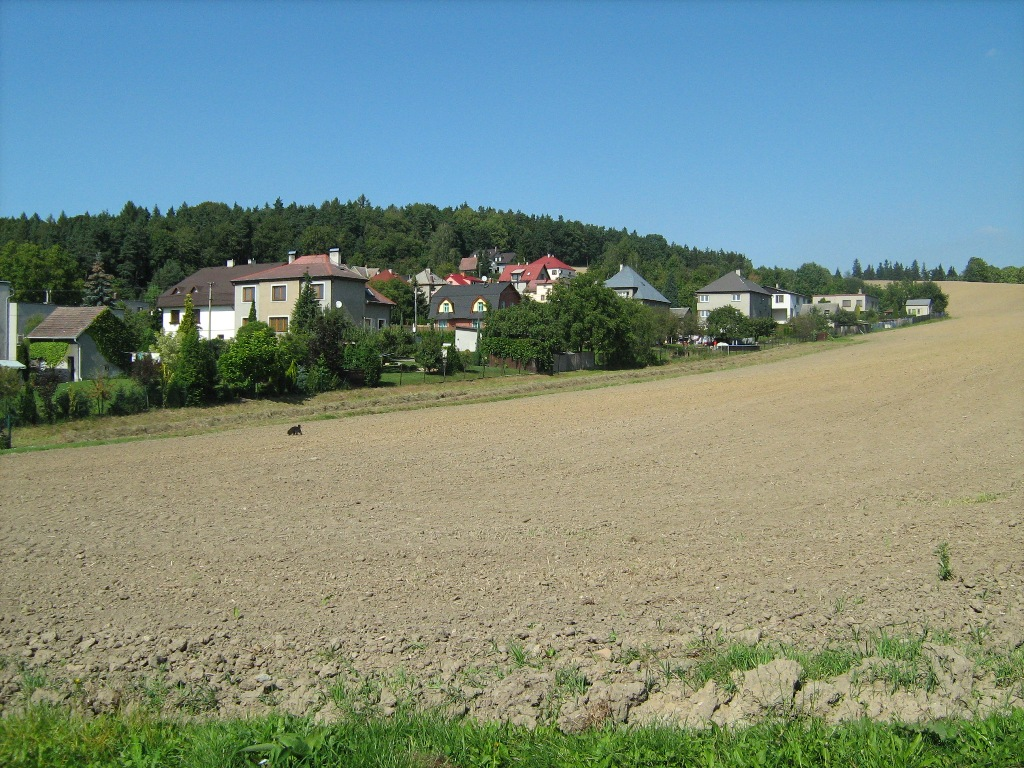
- View towards Lhotka

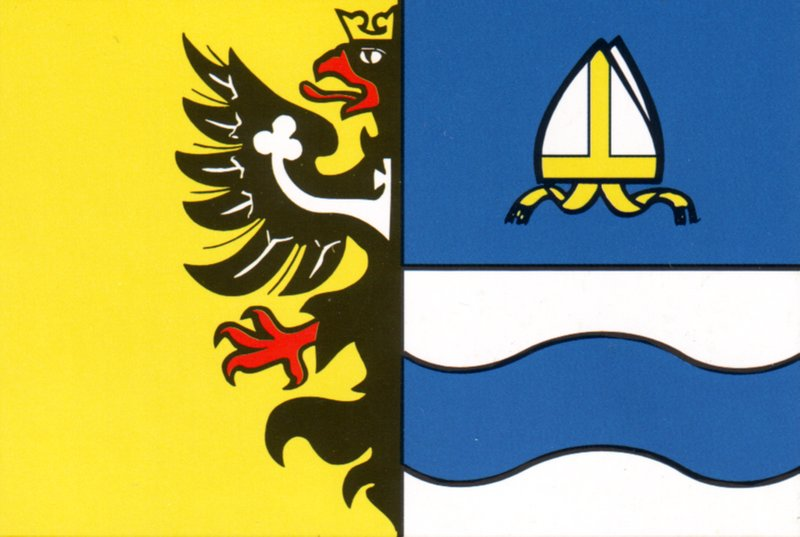
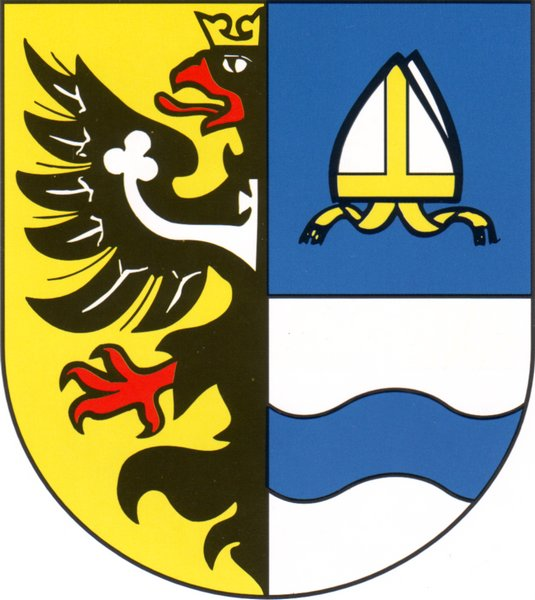
- Flag Coat of arms

- Location of Lhotka in Ostrava
- Coordinates: 49°51′21″N 18°13′59″E
- Country: Czech Republic
- Region: Moravian-Silesian
- Municipality: Ostrava

Area
  - Total: 2.14 km^{2} (0.83 sq mi)

Population (2021)
  - Total: 1,333
  - Density: 623/km^{2} (1,610/sq mi)
- Time zone: UTC+1 (CET)
  - Summer (DST): UTC+2 (CEST)
- Postal code: 725 28
- Website: lhotka.ostrava.cz

Lhotka is a borough and municipal part of the city of Ostrava in the Czech Republic. It is situated in the northern part of the city, on the left bank of the Oder River. It was a separate municipality until April 1976, when it merged with Ostrava. On 24 November 1990, it became one of the 23 self-governing boroughs of Ostrava.

== Etymology ==
The word lhotka is a diminutive form of the word lhota (or lhóta), which comes from the Old Czech word for lhůta, meaning 'period' or 'grace period'. When new settlements were established in areas with less fertile soil, settlers were often granted a temporary exemption from taxes for a specific period of time.

== Gallery ==
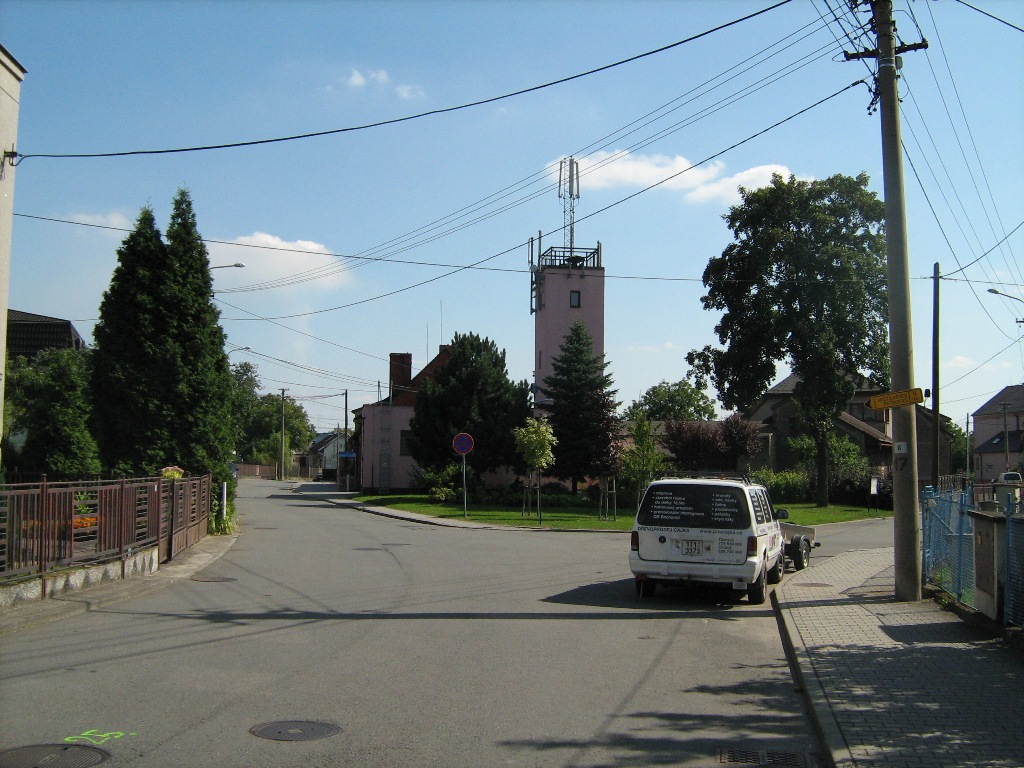
Firehouse

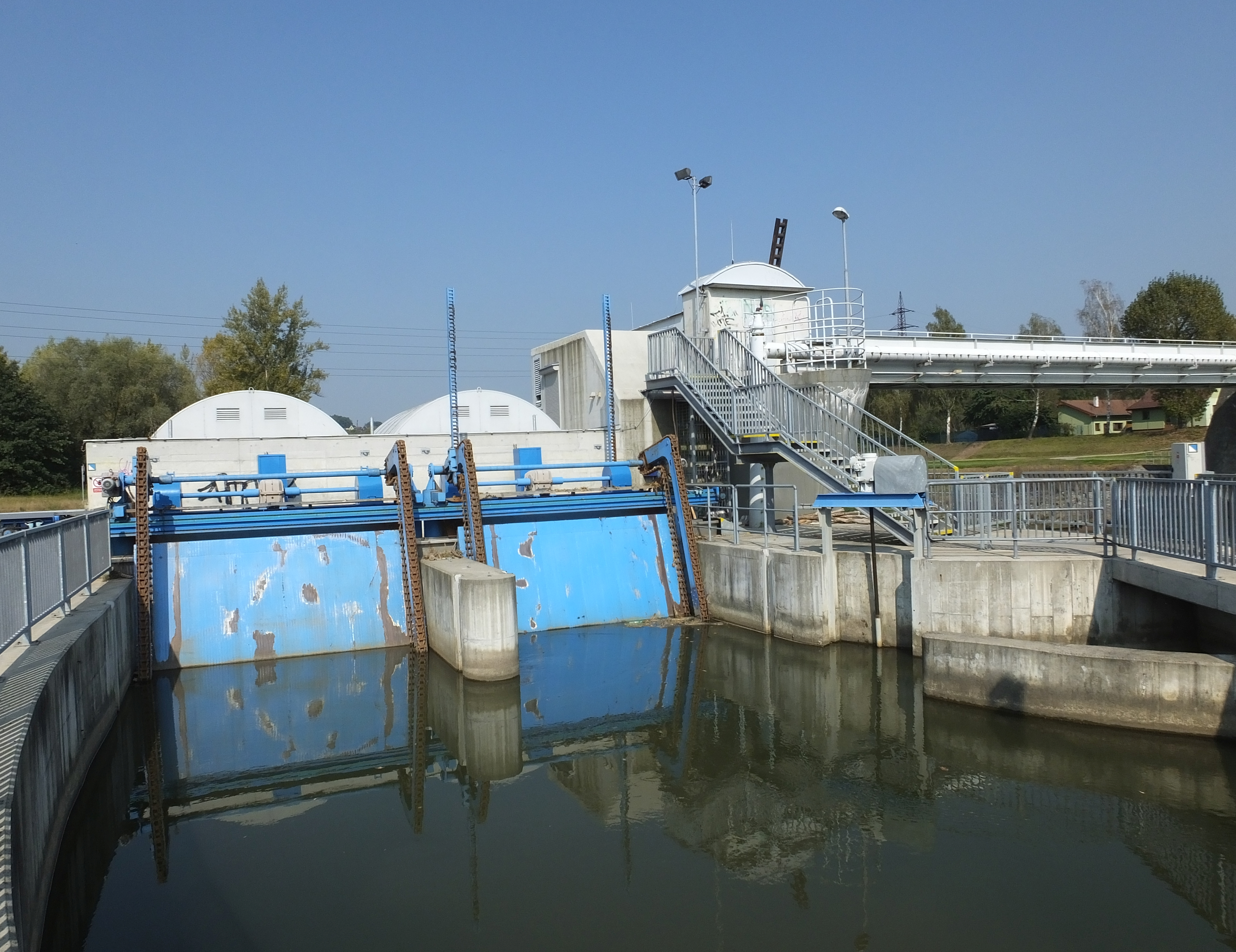
Hydroelectric power plant
