= Chuchelná =

- Municipality
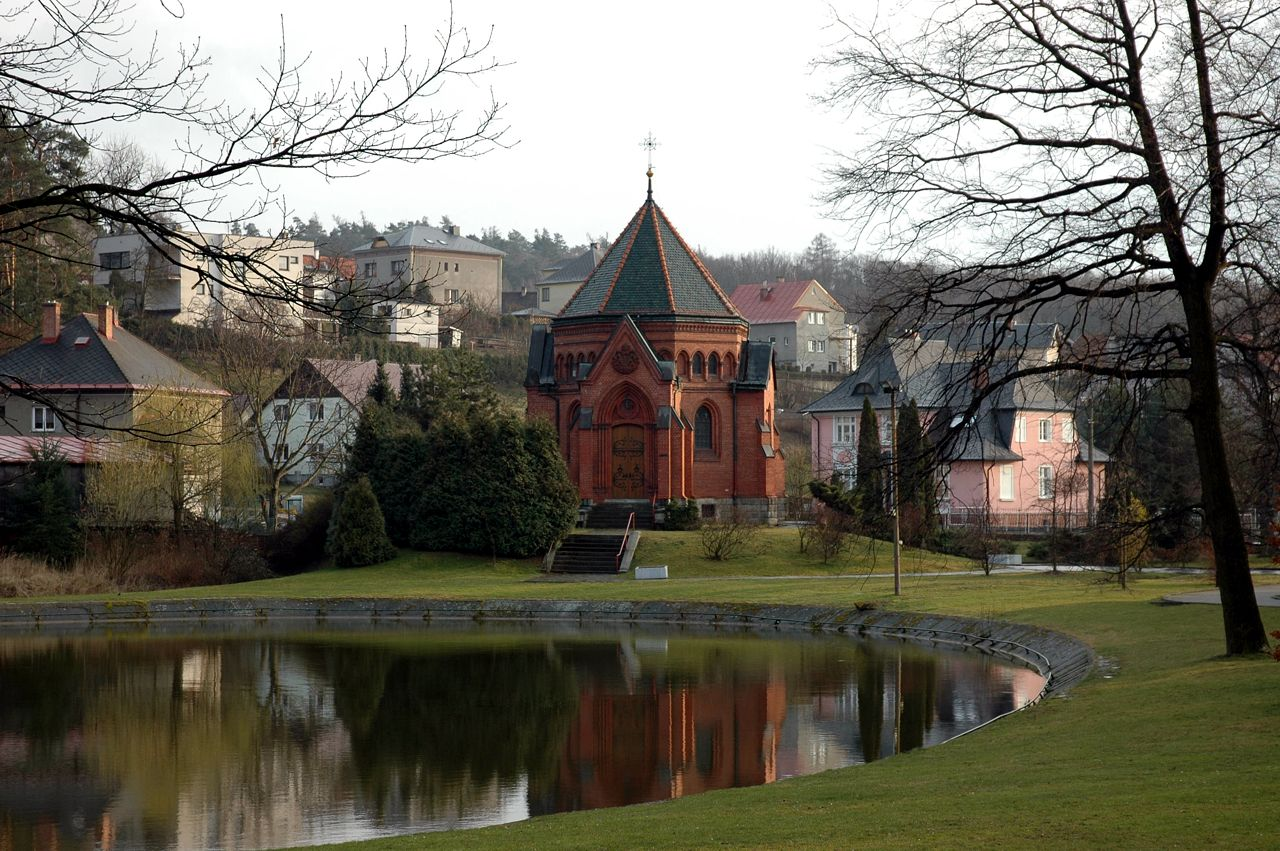
- Chapel of the Holy Cross

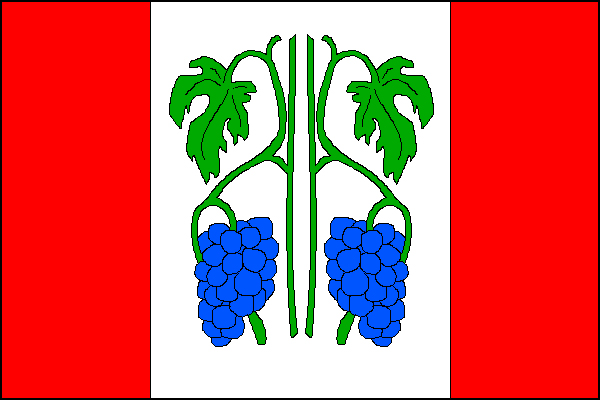
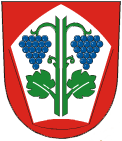
- Flag Coat of arms

- Location in the Czech Republic
- Coordinates: 49°59′12″N 18°7′0″E
- Country: Czech Republic
- Region: Moravian-Silesian
- District: Opava
- First mentioned: 1349

Area
  - Total: 7.67 km^{2} (2.96 sq mi)
- Elevation: 244 m (801 ft)

Population (2026-01-01)
  - Total: 1,283
  - Density: 167/km^{2} (433/sq mi)
- Time zone: UTC+1 (CET)
  - Summer (DST): UTC+2 (CEST)
- Postal code: 747 24
- Website: www.chuchelna.com

Chuchelná (German: Kuchelna) is a municipality and village in Opava District in the Moravian-Silesian Region of the Czech Republic. It has about 1,300 inhabitants. It is part of the historic Hlučín Region.

== History ==
The first written mention of Chuchelná is from 1349. From 1742 to 1918, after Empress Maria Theresa had been defeated, the village belonged to Prussia. In 1920, the municipality became part of the newly established Czechoslovakia.

== Demographics ==
Historical population
Year	Pop.	±%
1869	504	—
1880	509	+1.0%
1890	568	+11.6%
1900	592	+4.2%
1910	623	+5.2%
1921	1,019	+63.6%
1930	872	−14.4%
1950	915	+4.9%
1961	1,097	+19.9%
1970	1,109	+1.1%
1980	1,238	+11.6%
1991	1,313	+6.1%
2001	1,324	+0.8%
2011	1,341	+1.3%
2021	1,178	−12.2%
Source: Censuses

== Notable people ==
- Karl Max, Prince Lichnowsky (1860–1928), German diplomat; died here
