= Hlučín =

- Town
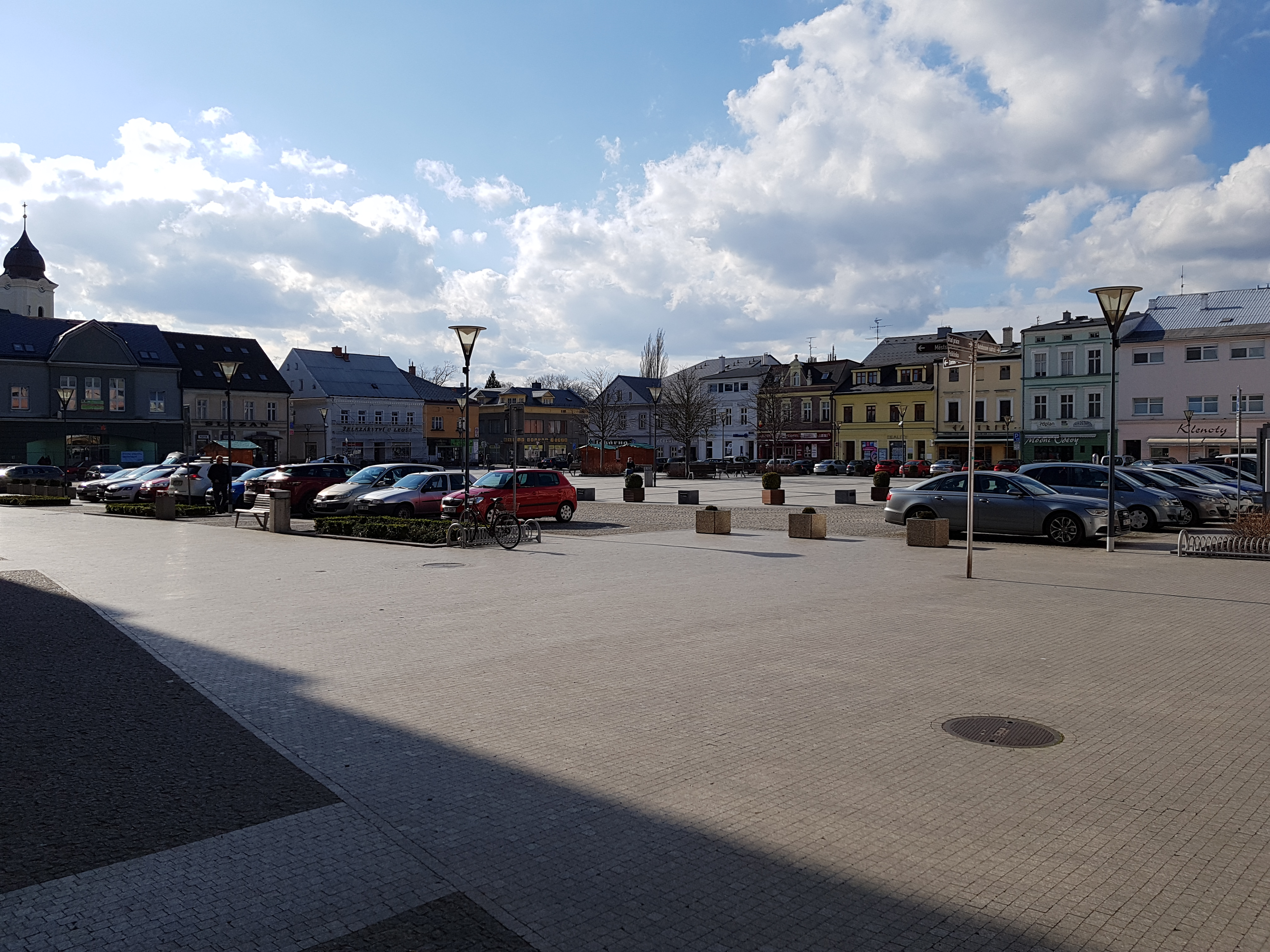
- The square Mírové náměstí

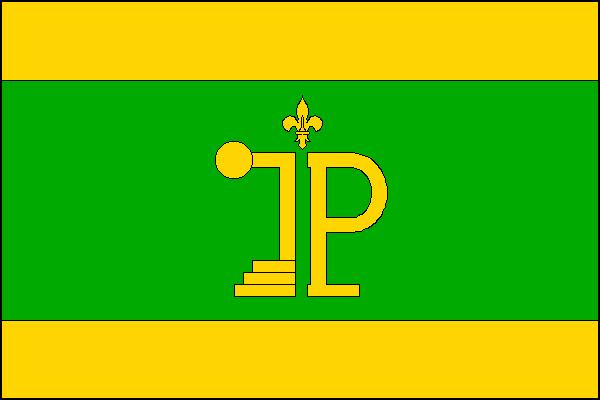
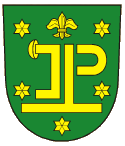
- Flag Coat of arms

- Location in the Czech Republic
- Coordinates: 49°53′48″N 18°11′35″E
- Country: Czech Republic
- Region: Moravian-Silesian
- District: Opava
- First mentioned: 1303

Government
  - Mayor: Petra Tesková

Area
  - Total: 21.14 km^{2} (8.16 sq mi)
- Elevation: 241 m (791 ft)

Population (2026-01-01)
  - Total: 13,245
  - Density: 626.5/km^{2} (1,623/sq mi)
- Time zone: UTC+1 (CET)
  - Summer (DST): UTC+2 (CEST)
- Postal code: 748 01
- Website: www.hlucin.cz

Hlučín (Czech pronunciation: [ˈɦlutʃiːn]; German: Hultschin; Polish: Hulczyn) is a town in Opava District the Moravian-Silesian Region of the Czech Republic. It has about 13,000 inhabitants.

Hlučín was the centre of the historic Hlučín Region. The historic town centre is well preserved and is protected as an urban monument zone. Among the main landmarks of the town are the Church of Saint John the Baptist and the Hlučín Castle, which houses the Hlučín Region Museum.

== Administrative division ==
Hlučín consists of three municipal parts (in brackets population according to the 2021 census):

- Hlučín (11,028)
- Bobrovníky (1,295)
- Darkovičky (1,311)

== Geography ==
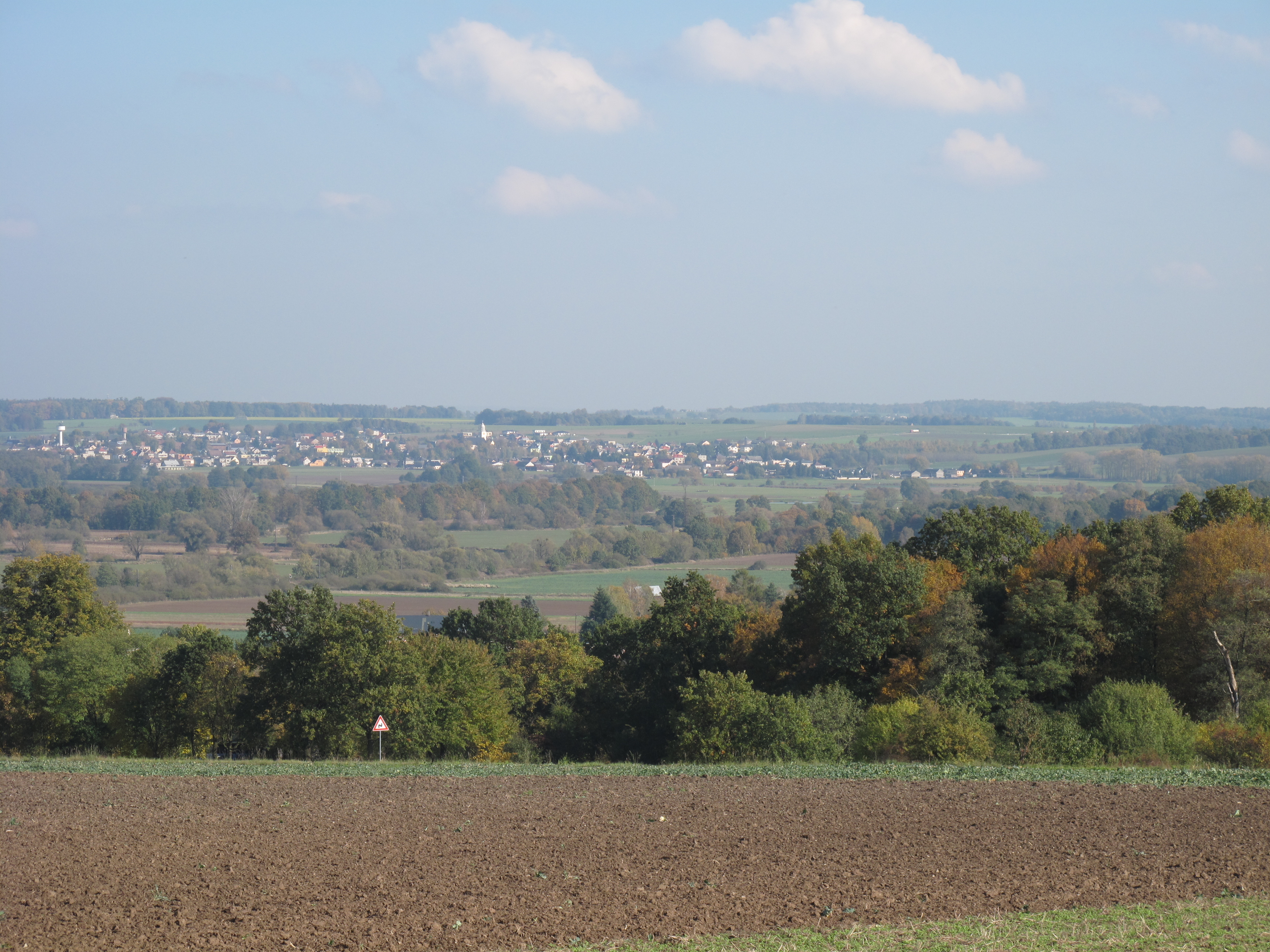
General view

Hlučín is located about 6 kilometres (4 mi) north of Ostrava and 20 km (12 mi) east of Opava. The northern part of the municipal territory lies in the Opava Hilly Land within the Silesian Lowlands and the southern part extends into the eastern tip of the Nízký Jeseník range.

Hlučínské jezero is an artificial lake on the outskirts of the town. The Opava River forms the southeastern municipal border.

== History ==
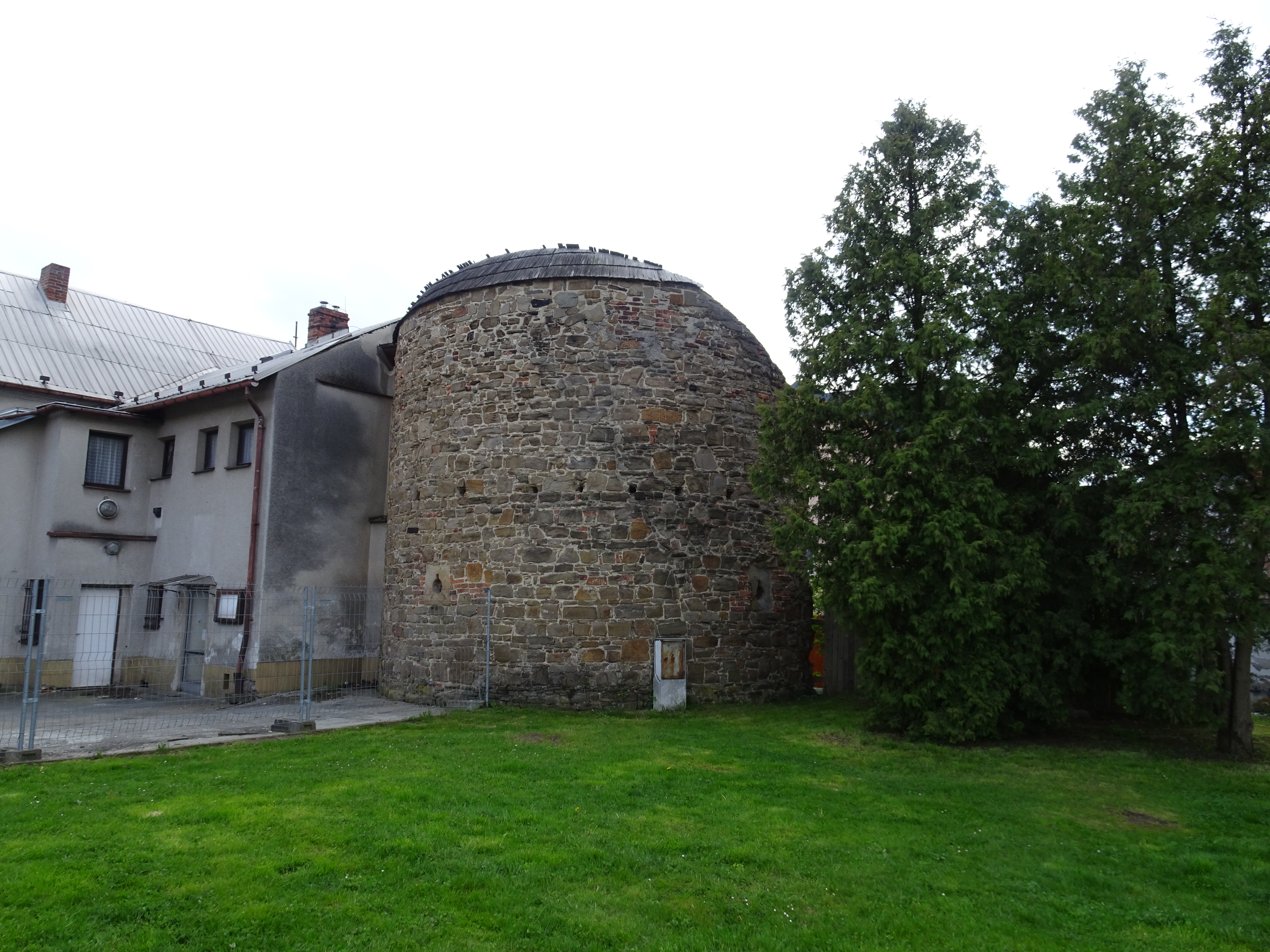
Fragment of town fortifications

The first written mention of Hlučín is from 1303, when it was part of the Duchy of Opava. The town was probably founded by King Ottokar II in 1256 to ensure peace on the border between Margraviate of Moravia and Duchy of Opole.

Until 1521, Hlučín belonged to the Landek estate within the Duchy of Opava. In 1521, it was acquired by the Piast Dukes of Opole. In the 17th and 18th centuries, the town burned down several times. In 1694, it was liberated of its serfdom. In 1742, after the First Silesian War, the town was given to the Kingdom of Prussia by the Treaty of Berlin. In 1845, the Hlučín estate was bought by the Rothschild family. Four annual fairs were held in the town in the late 19th century.

The town was administered by the Prussian Province of Silesia until 1920, when it became part of Czechoslovakia after World War I. The transferral of the Hlučín Region sparked controversy between Germans, Czechs and Poles. By a biased interpretation of the law, the new Czechoslovak authorities banned schooling in German even though that was the language spoken by the majority in the town.

After the Munich Agreement in 1938, Hlučín was annexed by Nazi Germany and was again made part of the Province of Silesia, and its Germanised name Hultschin was restored. During World War II, the Germans sent prisoners from the military prison in Kłodzko to forced labour in the town. Hlučín was restored to Czechoslovakia in 1945. German-speaking people were expelled in accordance with the Potsdam Agreement, some Germans left voluntarily. People who were labelled Czechs, even though they were actually Czech-speaking Germans, were spared expulsion.

== Demographics ==
Historical population

Year	Pop.	±%
1869	4,711	—
1880	5,034	+6.9%
1890	5,298	+5.2%
1900	5,652	+6.7%
1910	5,729	+1.4%

Year	Pop.	±%
1921	6,218	+8.5%
1930	6,685	+7.5%
1950	7,191	+7.6%
1961	10,446	+45.3%
1970	13,786	+32.0%

Year	Pop.	±%
1980	14,526	+5.4%
1991	14,390	−0.9%
2001	14,346	−0.3%
2011	13,917	−3.0%
2021	13,634	−2.0%

Source: Censuses

== Transport ==
The I/56 road from Ostrava to Opava runs through the town.

Hlučín is the starting point of a railway line of regional importance heading to Opava.

== Sights ==
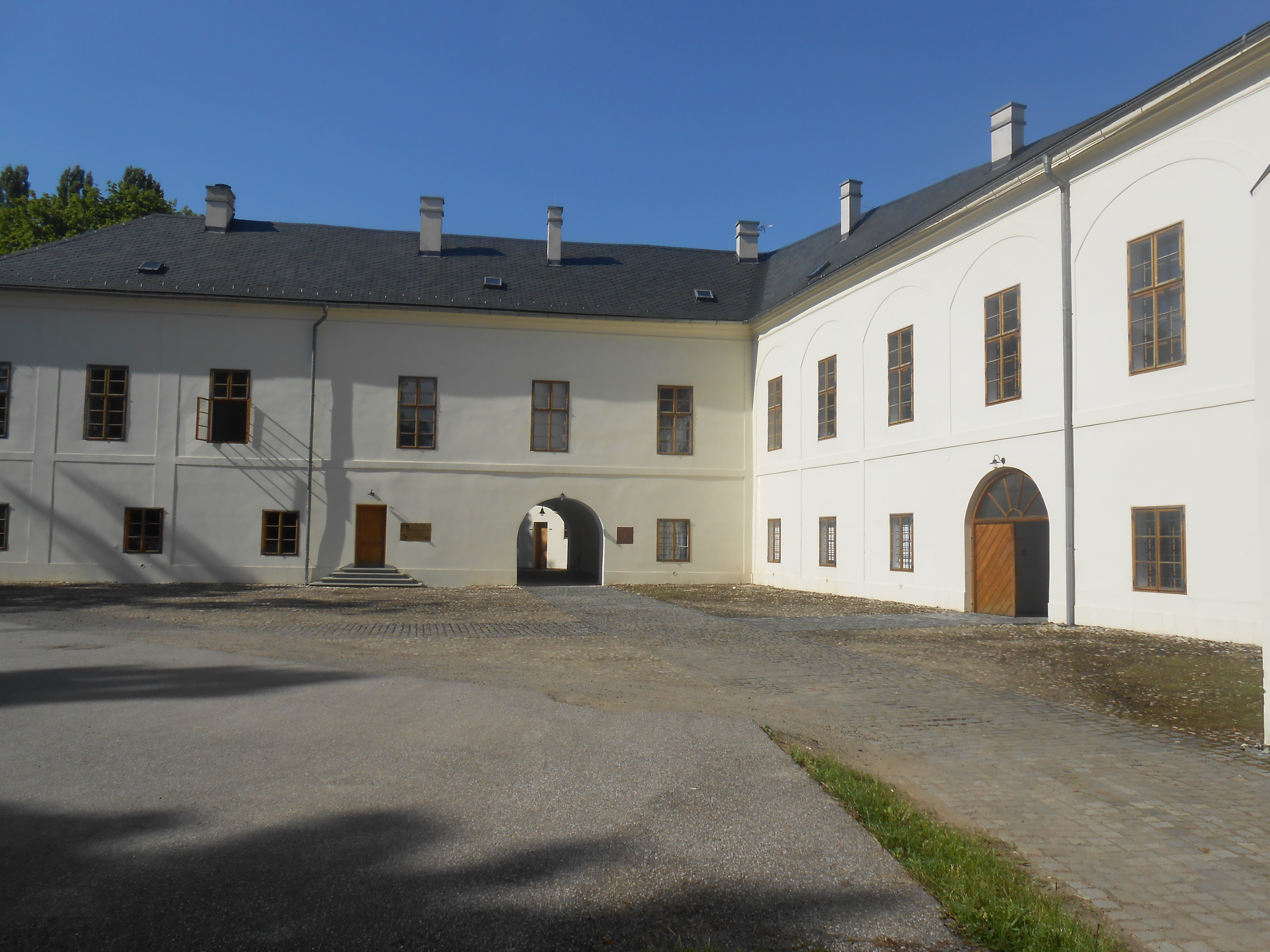
Hlučín Castle

The historic town centre is formed by the square Mírové náměstí and its surroundings. The centre was delimited by town fortifications, built in 1534–1535. Most of the town walls were demolished by 1829. Several fragments and seven bastions have been preserved to this day.

Hlučín Castle was built in the late Gothic style in 1526. It is a two-storey building with an irregular floor plan, and includes a small park. Today it houses the Hlučín Region Museum.

The second landmark is the Church of Saint John the Baptist. This parish church was first mentioned in 1378 and was rebuilt several times in the Renaissance, Baroque and pseudo-Gothic styles. The bell tower, which is 46.7 m (153 ft) high, was built in 1791.

In Darkovičky is the Hlučín-Darkovičky Czechoslovak Fortification Complex. It is an exhibition of a unique military technology from the 1930s.

== Notable people ==
- Pavel Josef Vejvanovský (c. 1639 – 1693), composer
- Emanuel Schäfer (1900–1974), German SS functionary and war criminal
- Verner Lička (born 1954), football player and manager
- Jiří Pavlenka (born 1992), footballer
- Michaela Konečná (born 1998), handball player

== Twin towns – sister cities ==
Hlučín is twinned with:

- Namysłów, Poland
- Nebelschütz, Germany
- Ružomberok, Slovakia
