= House of Auersperg =

Austrian princely family

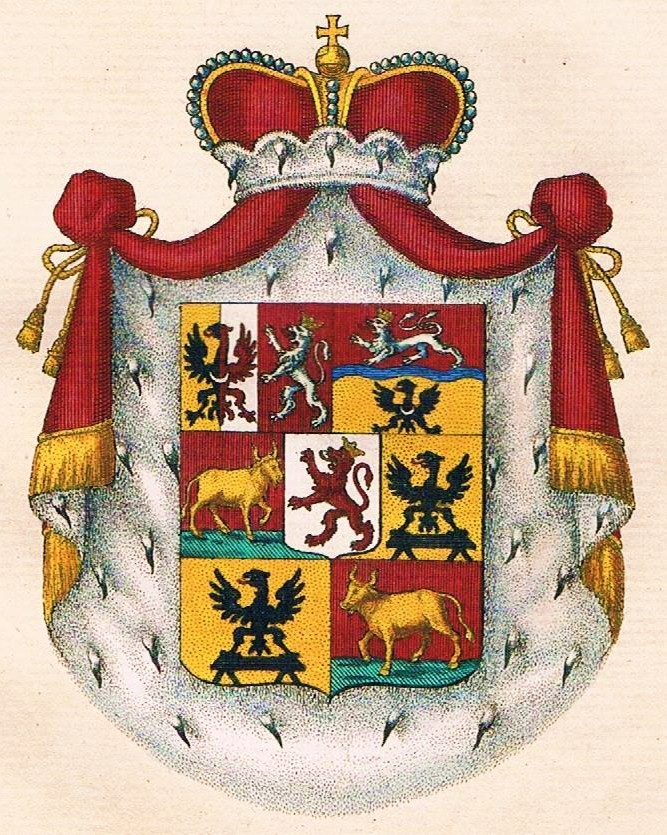
- Arms of the Princes of Auersperg
- Country: Holy Roman Empire; Austrian Empire; Austro-Hungarian Empire
- Origin: Auersperg Castle (Slovene: Grad Turjak; German: Burg Auersperg)
- Founded: 12th century
- Current head: Adolf, 11th Prince of Auersperg
- Final ruler: Wilhelm I, 6th Prince of Auersperg
- Titles: Prince of Auersperg; Duke of Gottschee; Duke of Münsterberg; Princely Count of Tengen; Princely Count of Wels; Count of Auersperg; Lord of Schönberg; Lord of Seisenberg
- Style: Serene Highness
- Deposition: 1806 (dissolution of the Holy Roman Empire)
- Cadet branches: Auersperg-Breunner; Auersperg-Trautson

The House of Auersperg (Slovene: Auerspergi or Turjaški) is an Austrian princely family and one of the most prominent families of the former Austro-Hungarian Empire. The family originates from the comital line of Auersperg in the Duchy of Carniola in today's Slovenia during the Middle Ages and belongs to the high nobility (one of the mediatised houses, or former sovereign families).

The Auerspergs held the rank of Princes of the Holy Roman Empire from 1653 and had an individual vote (Virilstimme) in the College of Princes of the Imperial Diet from 1664. They also held at various times the duchies of Münsterberg and Gottschee. Following the dissolution of the Holy Roman Empire in 1806, their Imperial State was mediatised to the Grand Duchy of Baden. The Auerspergs remained one of the most prominent families in the Austrian Empire and later Austro-Hungarian Empire, most notably serving as generals, prime ministers of the western half of the empire (Minister-President of Cisleithania) and presidents of the Austrian House of Lords.

== History ==
=== Origins ===
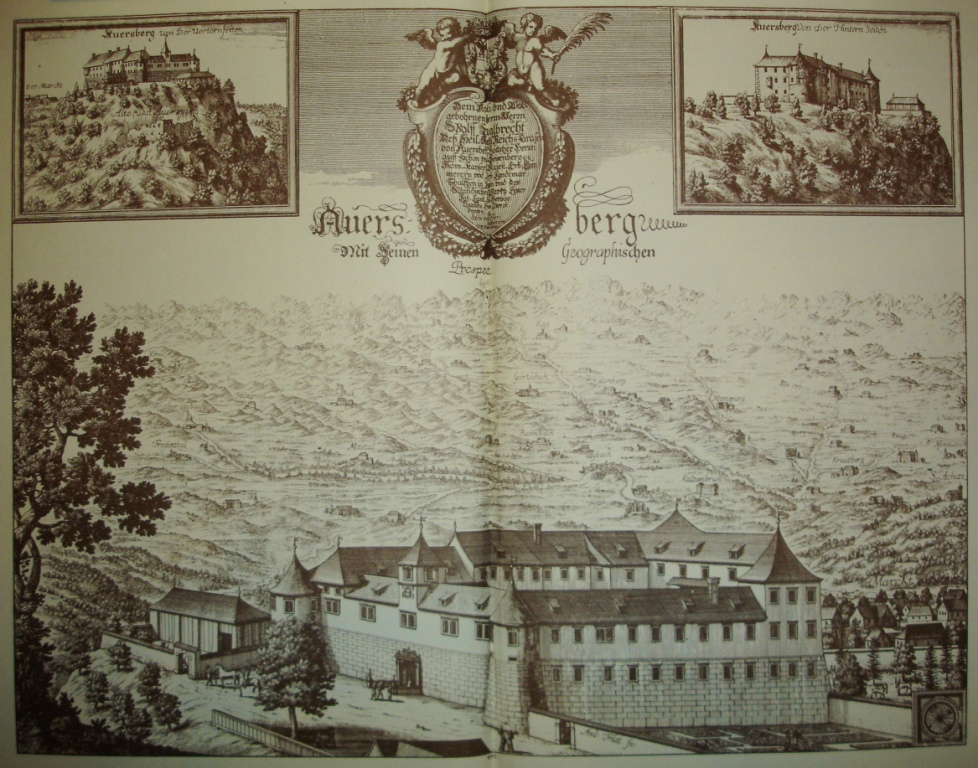
Auersperg Castle (Slovene: Grad Turjak), 1689 engraving in The Glory of the Duchy of Carniola

The oldest member of the House of Auersperg known for certain is Engelbertus de Ursberch, who is documented as a witness in a deed of 1162 issued by Herman, Duke of Carinthia at his residence in St. Veit an der Glan. The family's ancestral seat was Auersperg Castle (Slovene: Grad Turjak; German: Burg Auersperg), south of Ljubljana. It was built in 1067 by one Conrad of Auersperg, according to an engraving on site. Above the engraving stands the original Auersperg coat of arms, displaying an aurochs (German: Auerochs, Slovene: Tur).

The family may trace its origins to the town of Ursberg in Swabia, and their ancestors probably settled in Lower Carniola after Otto the Great’s victory over the Hungarians at the Battle of Lechfeld in 955. They held large estates from Grosuplje in the north down to Velike Lašče and Ribnica in the south, rivalling the Meinhardiner counts of Götrz, the Carinthian Ortenburg dynasty, and the Patriarchs of Aquileia.

In the mid-13th century, the edelfrei branch of the Auersperg family died out and was succeeded by a ministerial branch that retained the family's coat of arms, ancestral castle, and other estates.

=== Chamberlains of Carniola ===
In the early 15th century, the Auerspergs acquired the office of hereditary chamberlain (Obersterblandkämmerer), previously held by the lords of Reitenburg (Čretež). Herbard of Auersperg was the first member of the family to hold the office, inherited from the family of his mother, Elisabeth of Reitenburg (†1425), beginning in 1407. After Herbard's death, the office was inherited by his relative Engelhard of Auersperg (1404–1466), who owned Auersperg Castle.

Engelhard and his brother Volkhard V of Auersperg (1401–1451) jointly inherited the estate and castle of Schönberg (Šumberk) in Lower Carniola upon the death of their relative Johann II of Schönberg (†1443). The family subsequently split into two branches and divided their estates, with Engelhard's descendants retaining Auersperg Castle and Volkhard's descendants inheriting Schönberg. Pankraz II of Auersperg (1441–1496) succeeded his father Engelhard as chamberlain of Carniola, and was appointed captain of Möttling (Metlika) in 1470. Pankraz's son Trojan of Auersperg (1495–1541) fought against the Ottomans at the Siege of Vienna in 1529 and became governor of Lower Austria in 1537. Trojan was responsible for restoring Auersperg Castle following extensive damage caused by an earthquake in 1511.

=== Lords of Schönberg ===
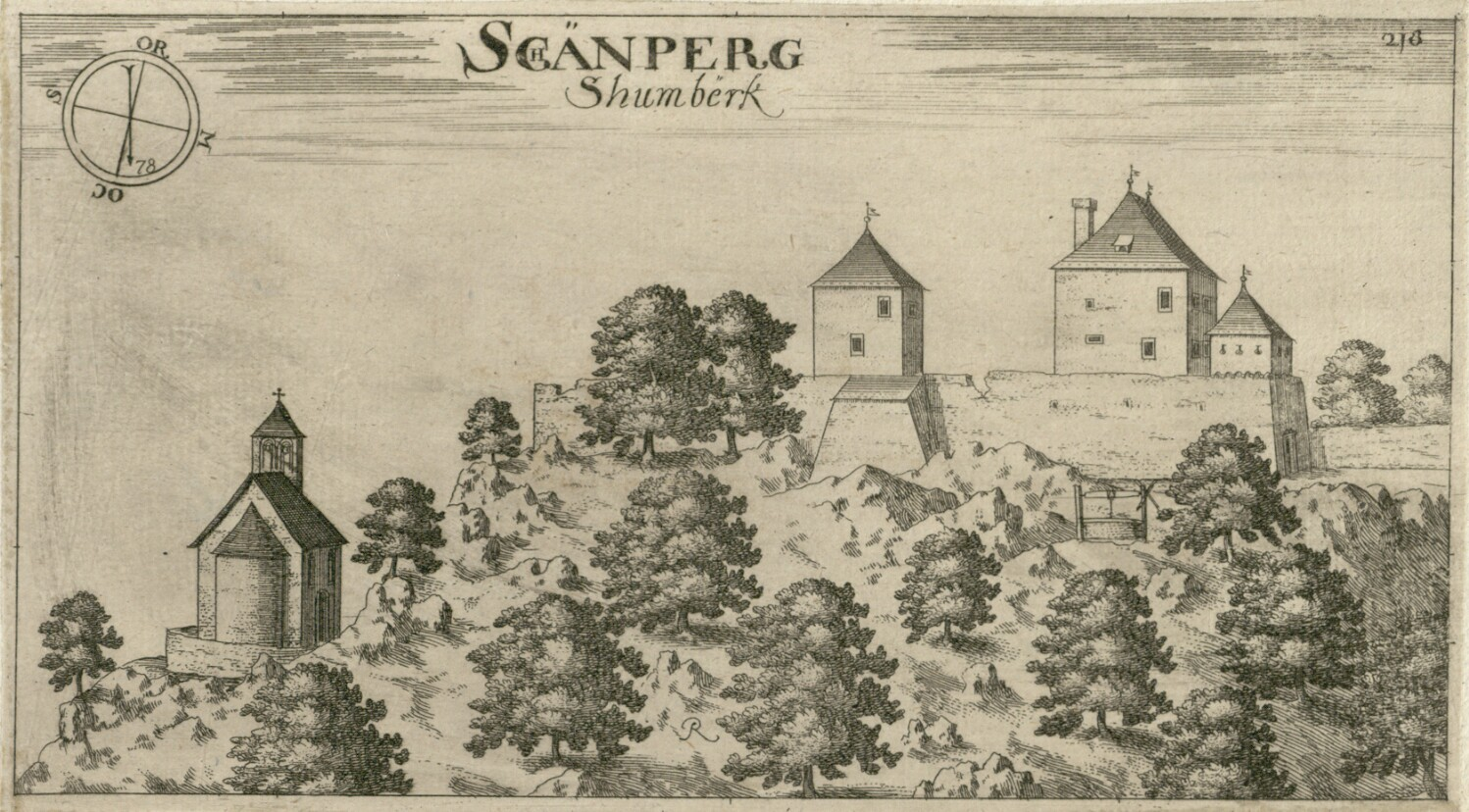
Schönberg Castle (Slovene: Grad Šumberk), 1679 engraving in The Glory of the Duchy of Carniola

Volkhard's sons (Johann III, Wilhelm II, Georg V) inherited Schönberg in the mid-15th century and established the so-called “Schönberg branch” of the family. They sided with Frederick III, Holy Roman Emperor in his rivalry against his brother, Archduke Albert VI for control over Austria, and in return for their support, the emperor awarded them with the office of hereditary marshal (Erblandmarshall) in Carniola and the Windic March in 1463.

Wilhelm II of Auersperg (†1506) succeeded as head of the Schönberg branch and became governor (Landeshauptmann) of Carniola in 1483. He had amassed such wealth in the second half of the 15th century that his contemporaries named him “the Rich,” and he was even able to lend money to the emperor. As Wilhelm remained without children, he raised his nephew Johann IV of Auersperg (†1529) as his heir. Johann was appointed governor of Carniola by Maximilian I (later Holy Roman Emperor) in 1501 and served in the War of the League of Cambrai against the Republic of Venice (1508–1516).

Johann's son, Wolf Englebert of Auersperg (†1557), inherited Schönberg, and in 1538 he acquired the nearby Seisenberg Castle (Žužemberk Castle) from King Ferdinand I (later Holy Roman Emperor). Wolf Englebert's son, Andreas von Auersperg (1556–1593), played a significant role in the military affairs of the empire and was called the “Carniolan Achilles” or “Turkish Terror” because of his military successes. In 1589 he was appointed commander of the Croatian Military Frontier, and in 1593 he was one of the military commanders that led the victory at the Battle of Sisak against the Ottoman Bosnian forces. The Schönberg branch died out in the generation after Andreas and its estates and titles passed to their relatives at Auersperg Castle.

=== Barons of Auersperg ===
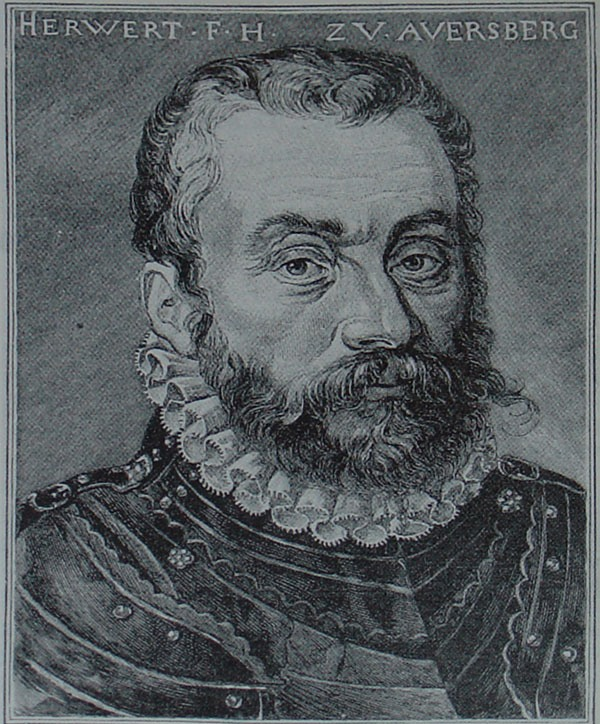
Baron Herbard VIII of Auersperg (1528–1575)

Herbard VIII von Auersperg (1528–1575) succeeded his father, Trojan, as chamberlain of Carniola. He became a renowned military leader in battles against the Ottomans and, in 1566, was appointed commanding general of the Croatian and Slavonian Military Frontier and governor of Carniola. In 1550 he was made imperial baron of the Holy Roman Empire (Reichsfreiherr) in Vienna. He died in battle in 1575, and his severed head was brought to the Sultan in Istanbul as a trophy. The ransom for the release of Herbard's head, as well as for the release of his son, is said to have paid for the construction of the Ferhat Pasha Mosque. Herbard's statue is exhibited in the Generals’ Hall (Feldherrenhalle) of the Museum of Military History in Vienna, which contains full-figure marble statues of Austria's best known and most distinguished generals.

Christoph of Auersperg (1550–1592) succeeded his father, Herbard, as head of the barons of Auersperg as well as chamberlain and regent of Carniola. Christoph's sons inherited Schönberg Castle, as well as the office of hereditary marshall of Carniola, when the Schönberg branch of the Auersperg family died out. The family subsequently split into two branches and divided their estates, with Christoph's eldest son, Baron Herbard of Auersperg (1574–1618), retaining Auersperg Castle, whilst his younger son, Baron (later Count) Dietrich of Auersperg (1578–1634), inherited Schönberg. Dietrich converted from Protestantism to Catholicism in 1625, which was particularly consequential for the family given the extent of religious conflict in Europe at that time.

=== Counts of Auersperg ===
Dietrich and his nephew Johann Andreas of Auersperg (1615–1664) were both raised to imperial counts (Reichsfreiherren) with the style “Well Born” (Wohlgeboren) by Ferdinand II, Archduke of Austria at Regensburg in 1630. Johann Andreas established the senior comital branch at Auersperg Castle, while Dietrich established the junior comital branch at Schönberg Castle, which was raised to princely status in the following generation. All members of the Auersperg family today descend from these two branches.

=== Sovereign princes of Auersperg ===
Principality of Auersperg Fürstentum Auersperg
- 1664–1806
- Coat of arms
- Status: State of the Holy Roman Empire
- Common languages: Bavarian
- Government: Principality
- Historical era: Early modern era
  - Auersperg raised to princely status: 17/18 September 1653
  - Princely County: 14 March 1664
  - Joined Council of Princes: 1664
  - Mediatised to Baden: 1806
Preceded by	Succeeded by
Further Austria	Grand Duchy of Baden; Austrian Empire

Johann Weikhard of Auersperg (1615–1677) served as a court councillor in Vienna and took part in the peace negotiations at Osnabrück that ultimately ended the Thirty Years’ War with the Peace of Westphalia. He was appointed tutor (Hofmeister) of the heir to the throne, Ferdinand IV with the ultimate aim of obtaining the Spanish crown for him, since the Spanish king did not have a son at that time. Following the election of Ferdinand IV to King of the Romans in 1653, Johann Weikhard was raised to the rank of imperial prince of the Holy Roman Empire (Reichsfürst) and to imperial count palatine (Großes Palatinat) with the style “High Born” (Hochgeboren), heritable in primogeniture. He was also granted the county of Wels and was given minting rights. In 1654 he was granted the Silesian duchies of Münsterberg and Frankenstein and was conditionally admitted to the Council of Princes (Fürstenrat) of the Imperial Diet with an individual vote (Virilstimme). The following year he became head of the imperial court (Obersthofmeister).

Johann Weikhard secured an unconditional seat in the Council of Princes in 1664 by acquiring the imperial estate of Tengen, together with the associated county of Nellenburg, from Sigismund Francis, Archduke of Austria. Tengen was subsequently raised to a princely county (gefürstete Grafschaft), and Johann Weikhard raised to princely count (Gefürsteter Graf) at Tengen. He subsequently served as prime minister to Leopold I, Holy Roman Emperor from 1665 to 1669.

=== Dukes of Gottschee ===
The Gottschee region in Slovenia today: the current Municipality of Kočevje

Following the Silesian Wars, Karl Joseph, 5th Prince of Auersperg (1720–1800) sold the duchies of Münsterberg and Frankenstein to the Prussian King Friedrich Wilhelm II in 1791. In return, Leopold II, Holy Roman Emperor elevated the Auersperg-owned county of Gottschee in Carniola to the duchy of Gottschee (German: Herzogtum Gottschee, Slovene: Kočevska Vojvodina) and granted Karl Joseph the title of duke of Gottschee. In the same year, the title of prince of the Holy Roman Empire (Reichsfürst) with the style “High Born” (Hochgeboren) was extended to all of Karl Joseph's descendants. Over the next century, all of his agnatic descendants were referred to as Fürst/Fürstin in official documents without exception. However, by the late 19th century, it became customary for cadets of the family to bear the title Prinz/Prinzessin, whilst only the head of the princely house carried the title of Fürst (as well as the ducal title). An exception was made, by agreement within the family, for the senior agnatic descendant of Prince Vincenz Nepomuk of Auersperg (1790–1863), who continued to carry the honorary title of Fürst as head of the Tyrolean branch of the family (later called Auersperg-Trautson).

Johann Adam of Auersperg (1721–1795), the younger brother of Karl Joseph, 5th Prince of Auersperg, was raised to imperial prince (Reichsfürst) in his own right and to imperial count palatine (Großes Palatinat) by Francis I, Holy Roman Emperor in 1746. Johann Adam married Countess Katharina of Schönfeld (1728–1753), heir to her father's estates in Bohemia, which Johann inherited after her death. His second marriage was to Maria Wilhelmina von Neipperg (1738–1775), mistress of Emperor Francis I. In 1777 Johann Adam acquired Palais Auersperg, originally called Palais Rosenkavalier, which he transformed into one of the most important buildings in Vienna. In 1862, Auerspergstraße in Vienna's Innere Stadt was named after him. As Johann Adam's children predeceased him, his titles became extinct with his death in 1795. His properties were inherited by his nephew Count (later Prince) Karl Joseph Franz (1750–1822), the second son of his older brother.

==== Auersperg-Trautson ====
Karl Joseph, 5th Prince of Auersperg married Countess Maria Josefa of Trautson (1729–1794), whose father, Johann Wilhelm, 2nd Prince of Trautson (1700–1775) was the last male member of a prominent Tyrolean princely house. Their first son, Wilhelm I, 6th Prince of Auersperg (1749–1822), inherited the Auersperg estates as head of the princely house, whilst their second son, Karl Joseph Franz, became sole heir to his maternal grandfather and therefore took the name Auersperg-Trautson.

Karl Joseph Franz distinguished himself as a successful military officer and was promoted to general and awarded the Knight's Cross of the Military Order of Maria Theresa. As lieutenant field marshal and commander of the Reserve Corps during the 1805 campaign, he was deceived by French marshals Murat and Lannes into believing that an armistice had been agreed and mistakenly allowed them to cross a bridge into Vienna. As a result of this military failure, he was court-martialed but ultimately pardoned and rehabilitated.

Karl Joseph Franz remained without children and adopted his nephew, Prince Vincenz of Auersperg (1790–1812), a younger son of his elder brother, as his heir. Following a proposal by the Tyrolean state government in 1963, the head of the branch descended from Vincenz, Prince Eduard Karl (1917–2002), took the name Auersperg-Trautson in recognition of the family's Tyrolean heritage as heirs of the princes of Trautson.

=== Mediatised princes of Auersperg ===
Wilhelm I, 6th Prince of Auersperg lost his status as a territorial ruler upon the annexation of Tengen by the Grand Duchy of Baden, under the terms of the Treaty of the Confederation of the Rhine in July 1806. The Holy Roman Empire was dissolved the following month. Wilhelm I subsequently sold his remaining rights to Tengen, as well as the estates that he continued to hold privately within the princely county, to Baden in 1811.

As a mediatised house, the princes of Auersperg were entitled by the Congress of Vienna to retain equality of birth (Ebenbutigkeit) with the reigning houses of Europe. In 1825 the German Diet recognised the style of “Serene Highness” (Durchlaucht) for the head of the princely house, Wilhelm II, 7th Prince of Auersperg, heritable in primogeniture. The same was also enacted in Austria. The style “Serene Highness” was eventually extended to all members of the princely house in 1869.

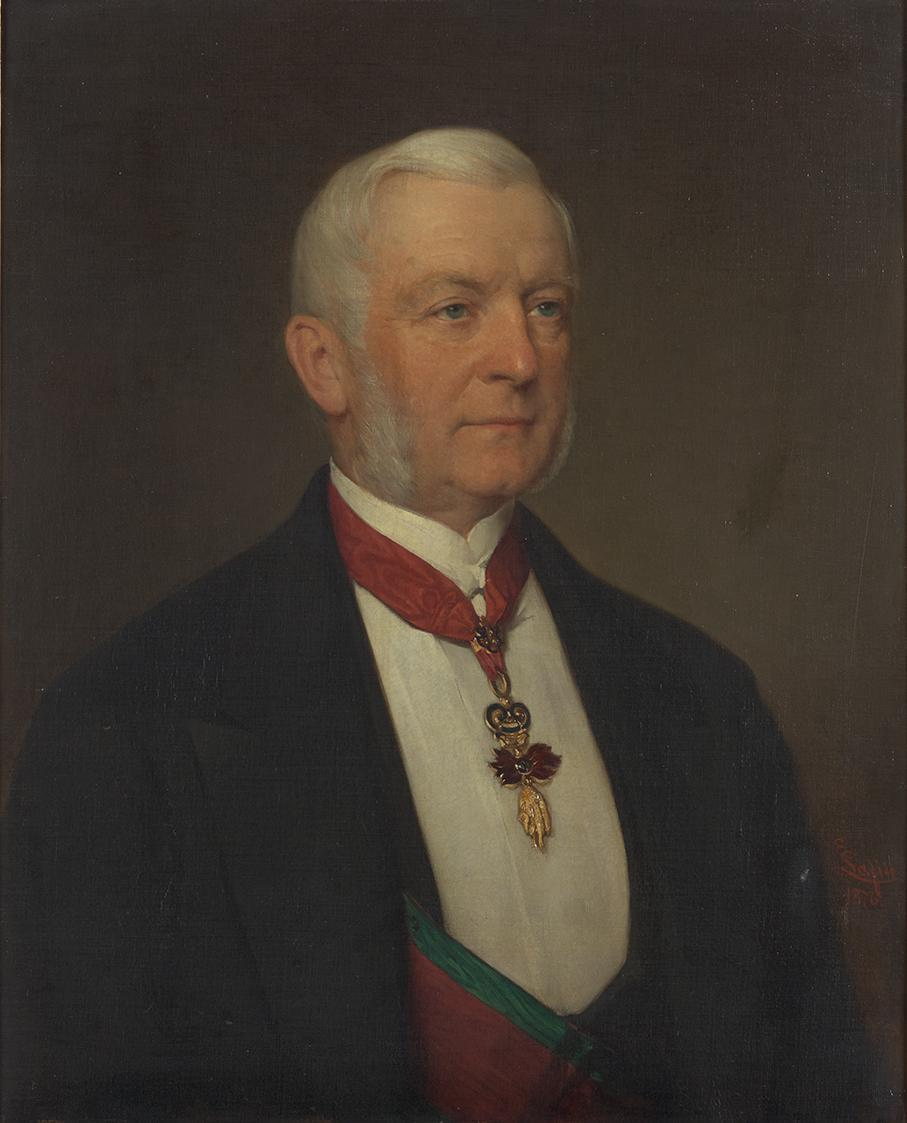
Karl, 8th Prince of Auersperg (1814–1890)

In 1837 Emperor Ferdinand I established an order of precedence among the hereditary nobility of the Austrian Empire, which remained in place until the end of the Austrian monarchy. Below the reigning houses, it placed those princes that had held an individual vote in the Council of Princes as the most senior group, ordered by the date of their elevation to the princely rank. This placed Auersperg as the fifth most senior mediatised house, following the princely houses of Arenberg, Lobkowitz, Salm and Dietrichstein (†1864). The same order of precedence was established in Prussia.

On the advent of the new constitutional era in 1861, Emperor Franz Joseph I established a bicameral Imperial Council (Reichsrat) and appointed Karl, 8th Prince of Auersperg (1814–1890) as the first president of the Austrian House of Lords. Karl subsequently served as the first prime minister of the western part of the Austro-Hungarian Empire (Cisleithania), an office that was subsequently held by his brother Prince Adolf of Auersperg (1821–1885). Adolf's son Karl, 9th Prince of Auersperg (1859–1927) became vice-president of the Austrian House of Lords and leader of the Constitutional Party from 1897 to 1907.

==== Auersperg-Breunner ====
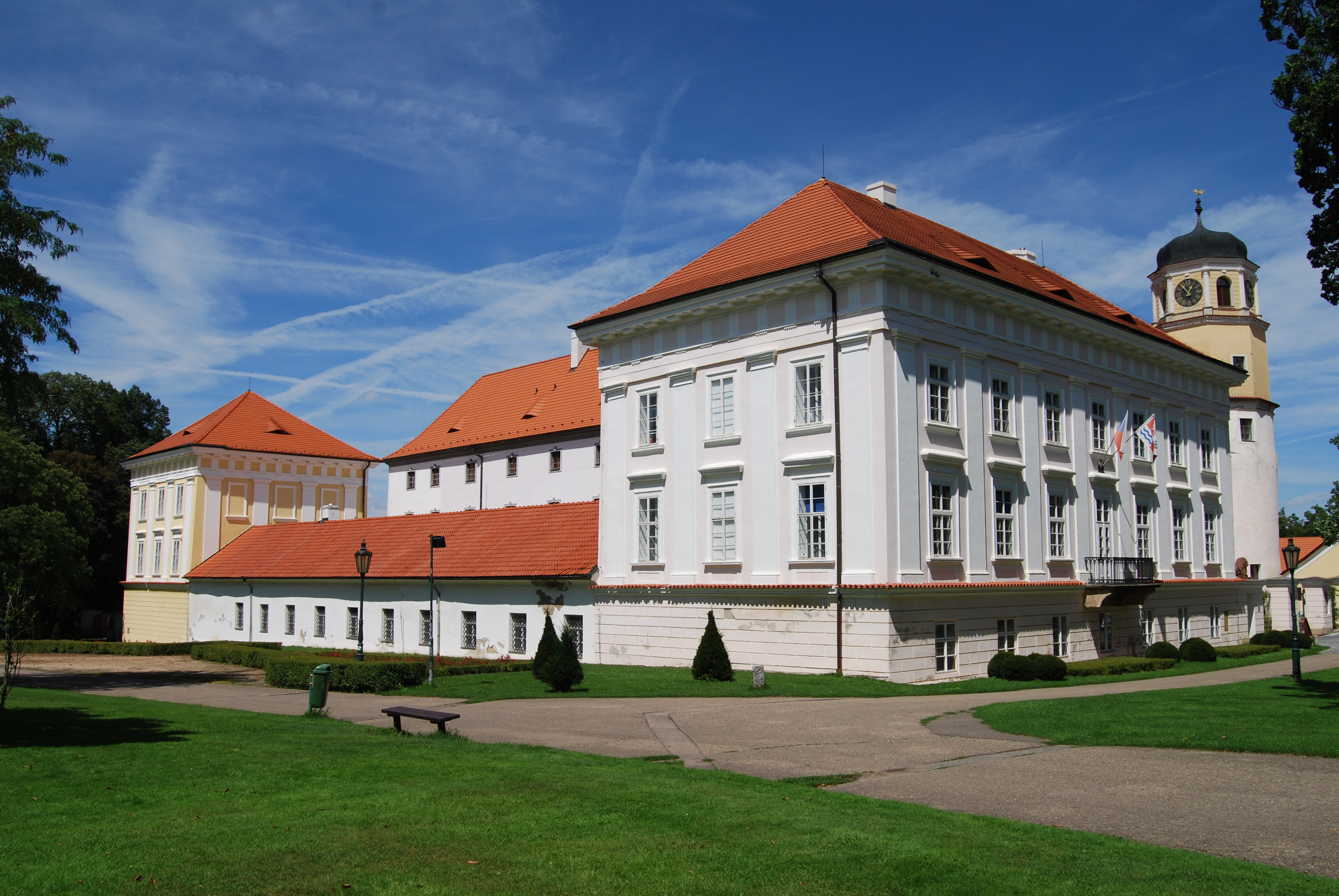
Wlaschim Castle (Czech: Zámek Vlašim) in the Czech Republic

In the late 19th century, Karl, 9th Prince of Auersperg married Countess Eleonore of Breunner-Enkevoirt (1864–1920), whose father, Count August Johann of Breunner-Enkevoirt (1828–1894), was the last male member of a prominent Austrian noble family. The descendants of their first son, Prince Adolf of Auersperg (1886–1923), inherited the central princely Auersperg estates, while their second son, Prince Karl of Auersperg (later Auersperg-Breunner) (1895–1960), inherited the Auersperg estates of Wlaschim (Vlašim) in Czechoslovakia and Ainod (Soteska) in Yugoslavia. In 1928 the younger Karl also inherited the former Breunner estates of Zselíz (Želiezovce) in Czechoslovakia and Ganad in Hungary from his aunt, Countess Ernestine of Coudenhove (born Breunner-Enkevoirt), who did not have children of her own. The Hungarian government subsequently authorised him to bear the name Auersperg-Breunner in 1929 and confirmed his princely rank in 1940. In 1930 he acquired Wald Castle in Lower Austria.

== Princes of Auersperg (1653–present) ==
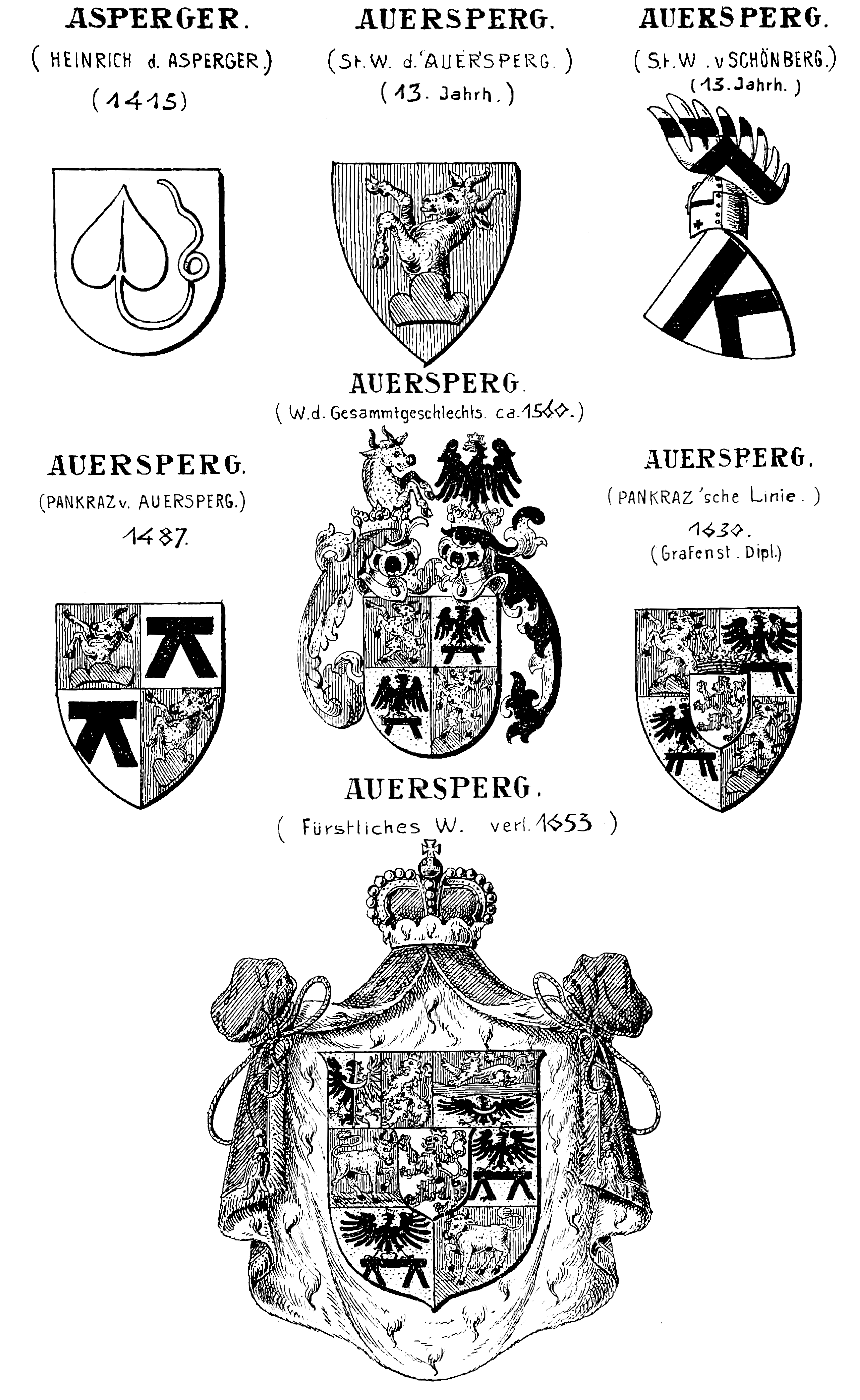
Evolution of the family's arms

- Johann Weikhard, 1st Prince of Auersperg (1653–1677), Count of Auersperg, Duke of Silesia-Münsterberg (1615–1677)
  - Johann Ferdinand, 2nd Prince of Auersperg (1677–1705), Duke of Silesia-Munsterberg (1655–1705)
  - Franz Karl, 3rd Prince of Auersperg (1705–1713), Duke of Silesia-Munsterberg (1660–1713)
    - Heinrich Joseph Johann, 4th Prince of Auersperg (1713–1783), Duke of Silesia-Munsterberg (1697–1783)
      - Karl Josef, 5th Prince of Auersperg (1783–1800), Duke of Silesia-Munsterberg, Duke of Gottschee (1720–1800)
        - Wilhelm I, 6th Prince of Auersperg (1800–1822), Duke of Gottschee (1749–1822)
          - Wilhelm II, 7th Prince of Auersperg (1822–1827), Duke of Gottschee (1782–1827)
            - Karl Wilhelm Philipp, 8th Prince of Auersperg (1827–1890), Duke of Gottschee (1814–1890)
            - Prince Adolf of Auersperg (1821–1885)
              - Karl, 9th Prince of Auersperg (1890–1927), Duke of Gottschee (1859–1927)
                - Adolf, Hereditary Prince of Auersperg (1886–1923)
                  - Karl Adolf, 10th Prince of Auersperg (1927–2006), Duke of Gottschee, Princely Count of Wels (1915–2006)
                    - Adolf, 11th Prince of Auersperg (2006–present), Duke of Gottschee, Princely Count of Wels (born 1937)
                      - (1) Hereditary Prince Carl Adolf of Auersperg (born 1962)
                      - (2) Prince Alexander of Auersperg (born 1963)
                        - (3) Prince Alejandro of Auersperg (born 1993)
                      - (4) Prince Andreas of Auersperg (born 1980)
                      - (5) Prince Francisco of Auersperg (born 2010)
                    - Prince Ferdinand of Auersperg (1939-2019)
                      - (6) Prince Fernando of Auersperg (born 1976)
                        - (7) Prince Juan Sebastián of Auersperg (born 2010)
                        - (8) Prince Matías of Auersperg (born 2012)
                        - (9) Prince Guillermo of Auersperg (born 2015)
                  - Prince Franz of Auersperg (1923–2004)
                    - (10) Prince Egmont of Auersperg (born 1947)
                      - (11) Prince Georg of Auersperg (born 1985)
                    - (12) Prince Andreas of Auersperg (born 1949)
                      - (13) Prince Lukas of Auersperg (born 1981)
                        - (14) Prince Ludwig of Auersperg (born 2015)
                    - (15) Prince Philipp of Auersperg (born 1969)
                      - (16) Prince Ferdinand of Auersperg (born 1995)
                      - (17) Prince Leopold of Auersperg (1997)
                - Prince Karl of Auersperg-Breunner (1895–1980)
                  - Prince Karl of Auersperg-Breunner (1930-2024)
                    - (18) Prince Franz-Joseph of Auersperg-Breunner (born 1956)
                      - (19) Prince Camillo of Auersperg-Breunner (born 1984)
                      - (20) Prince Douglas of Auersperg-Breunner (1987)
                    - (21) Prince Karl-Georg of Auersperg-Breunner (born 1960)
                      - (22) Prince Karl Ilias of Auersperg-Breunner (born 1995)
                      - (23) Prince Dimitri of Auersperg-Breunner (born 2000)
                    - (24) Prince Alexander of Auersperg-Breunner (born 1968)
                      - (25) Prince Aloysius of Auersperg-Breunner (born 2006)
                      - (26) Prince Balthasar of Auersperg-Breunner (born 2011)
                      - (27) Prince Hannibal of Auersperg-Breunner (born 2014)
                  - Prince Heinrich of Auersperg-Breunner (1931-2026)
                    - (28) Prince Johann Weikhard of Auersperg-Breunner (born 1961)

== Other family members ==
- Joseph Franz Auersperg (1734–1795), Austrian count, prince bishop of Passau, cardinal
- Count Anton Alexander von Auersperg (1806–1876), Austrian poet ("Anastasius Grün") and liberal politician from Carniola

== Palaces and residences ==
=== Slovenia ===
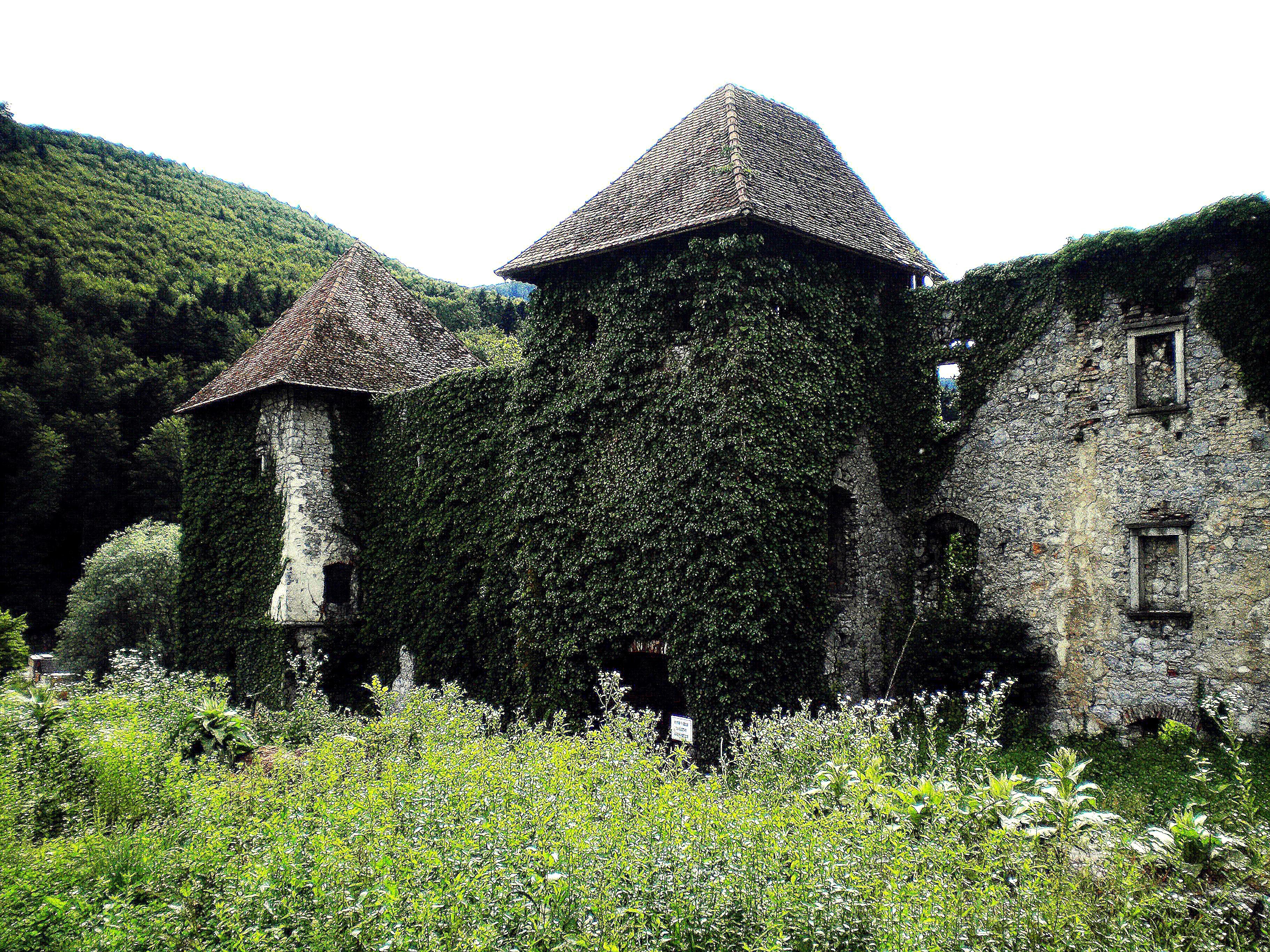
Ainödt Castle: Auersperg-Breunner branch, destroyed by Slovene Partisans 1943

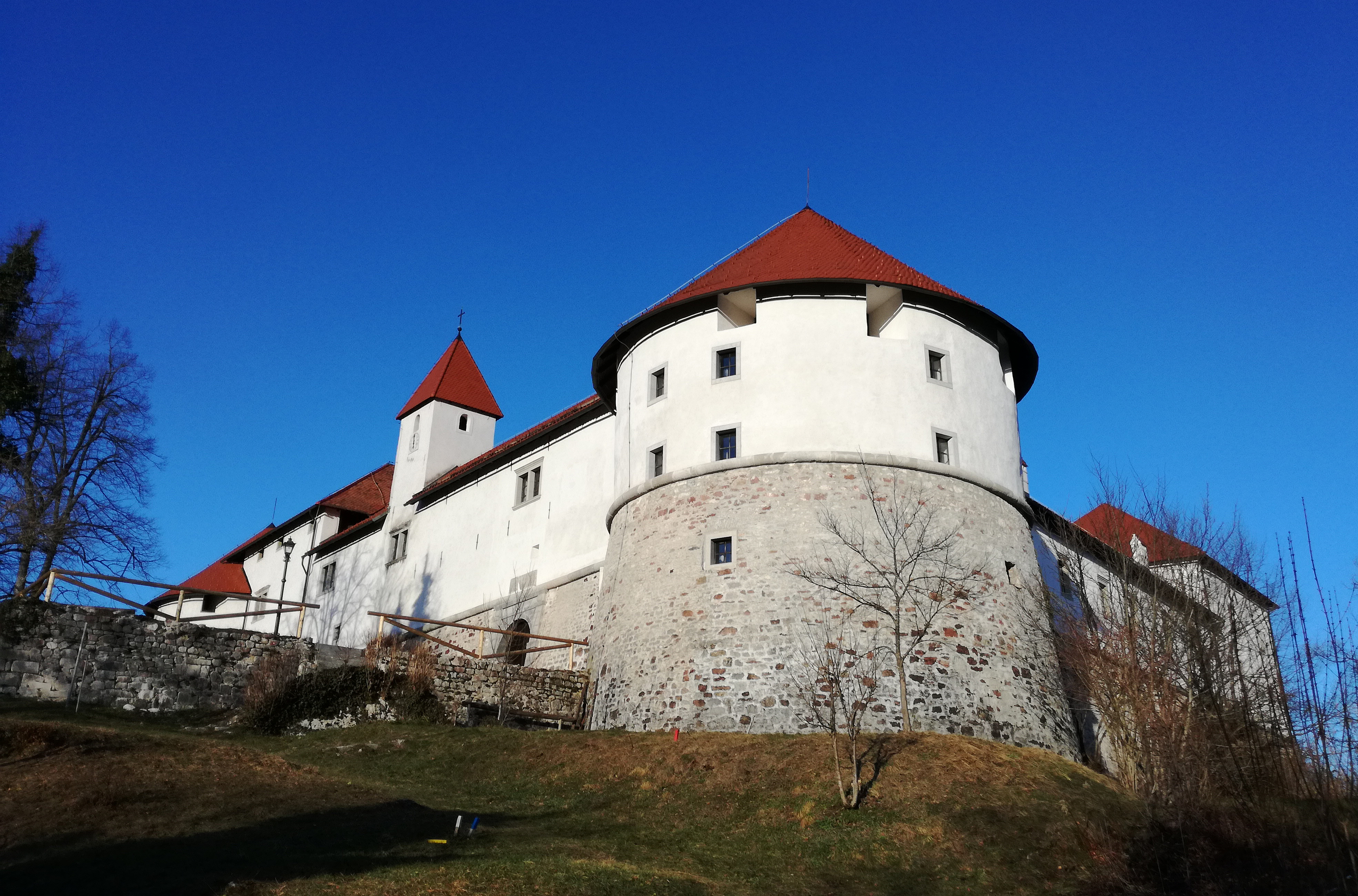
Auersperg Castle (Turjak): Ancestral seat of senior comital line, expropriated 1945

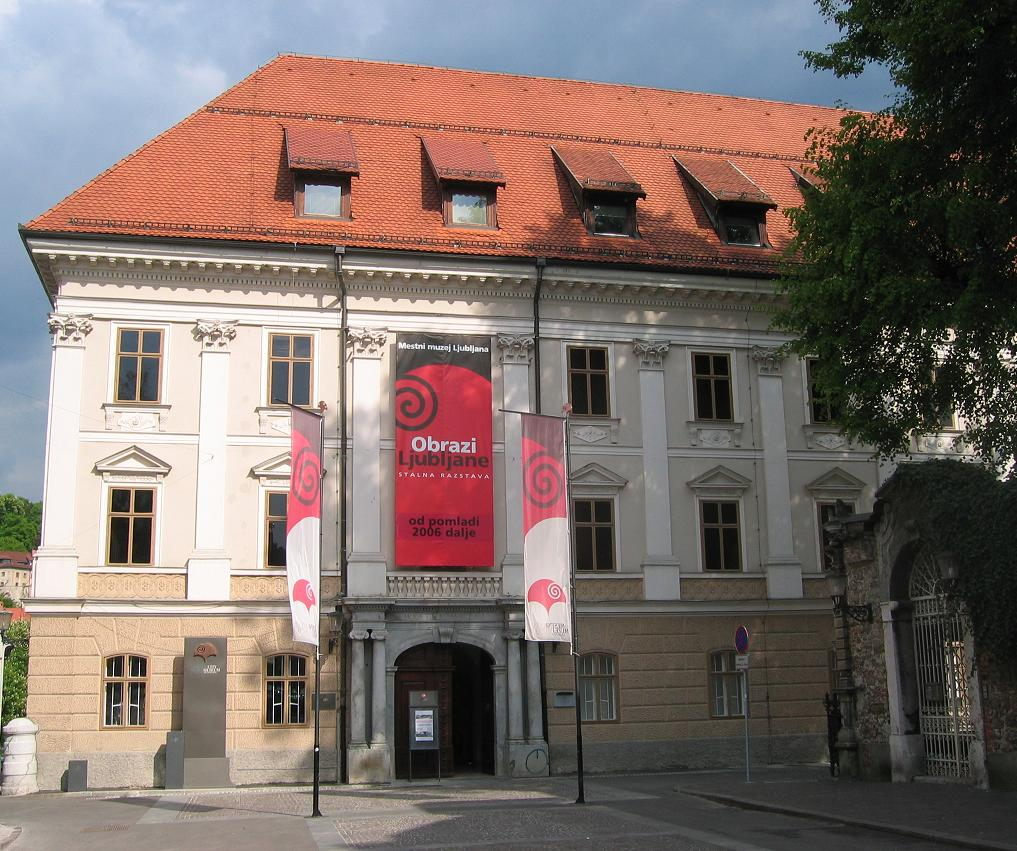
Auersperg Palace, Ljubljana: Senior comital line, sold 1927

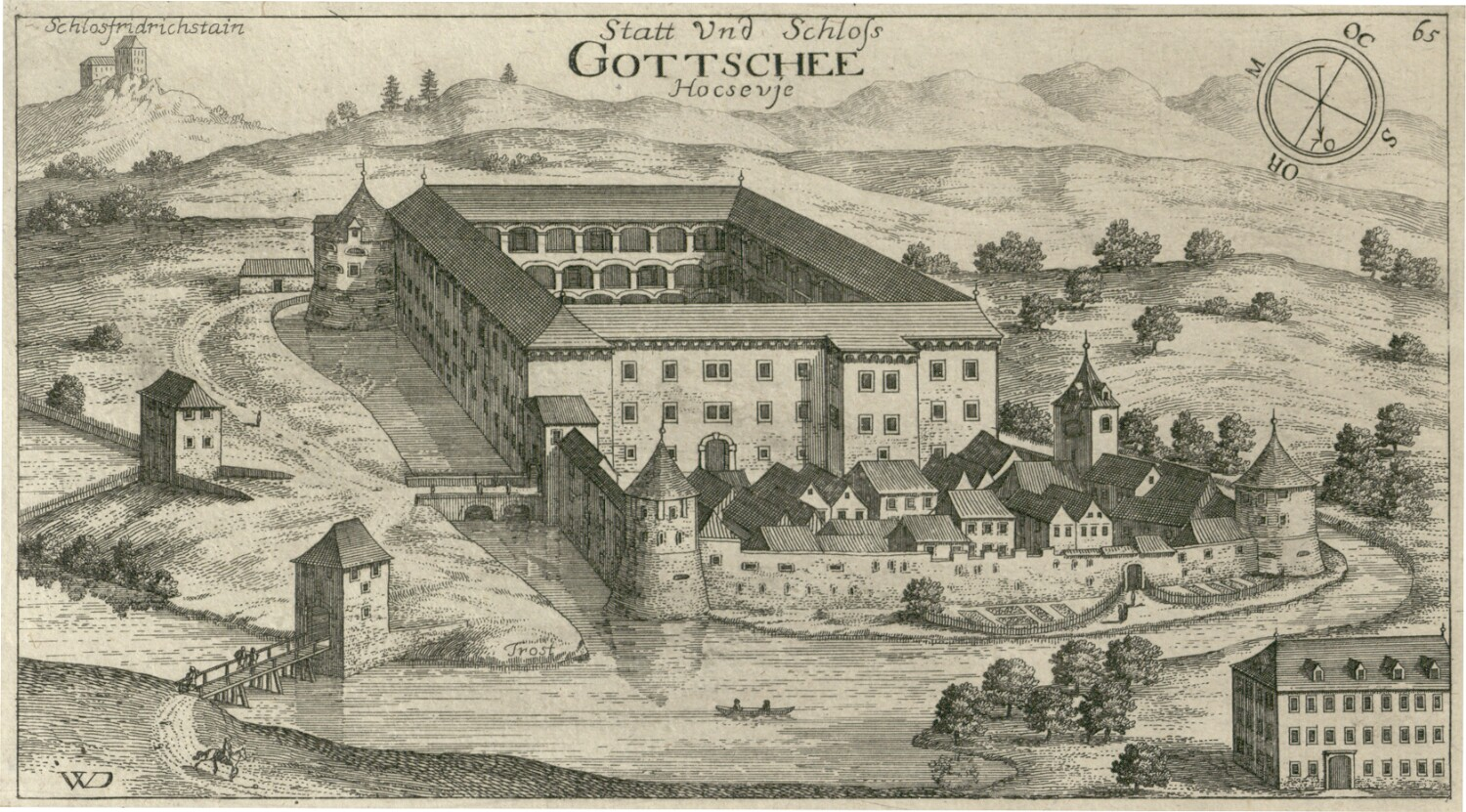
Gottschee Castle: Seat of the Duchy of Gottschee, expropriated 1945

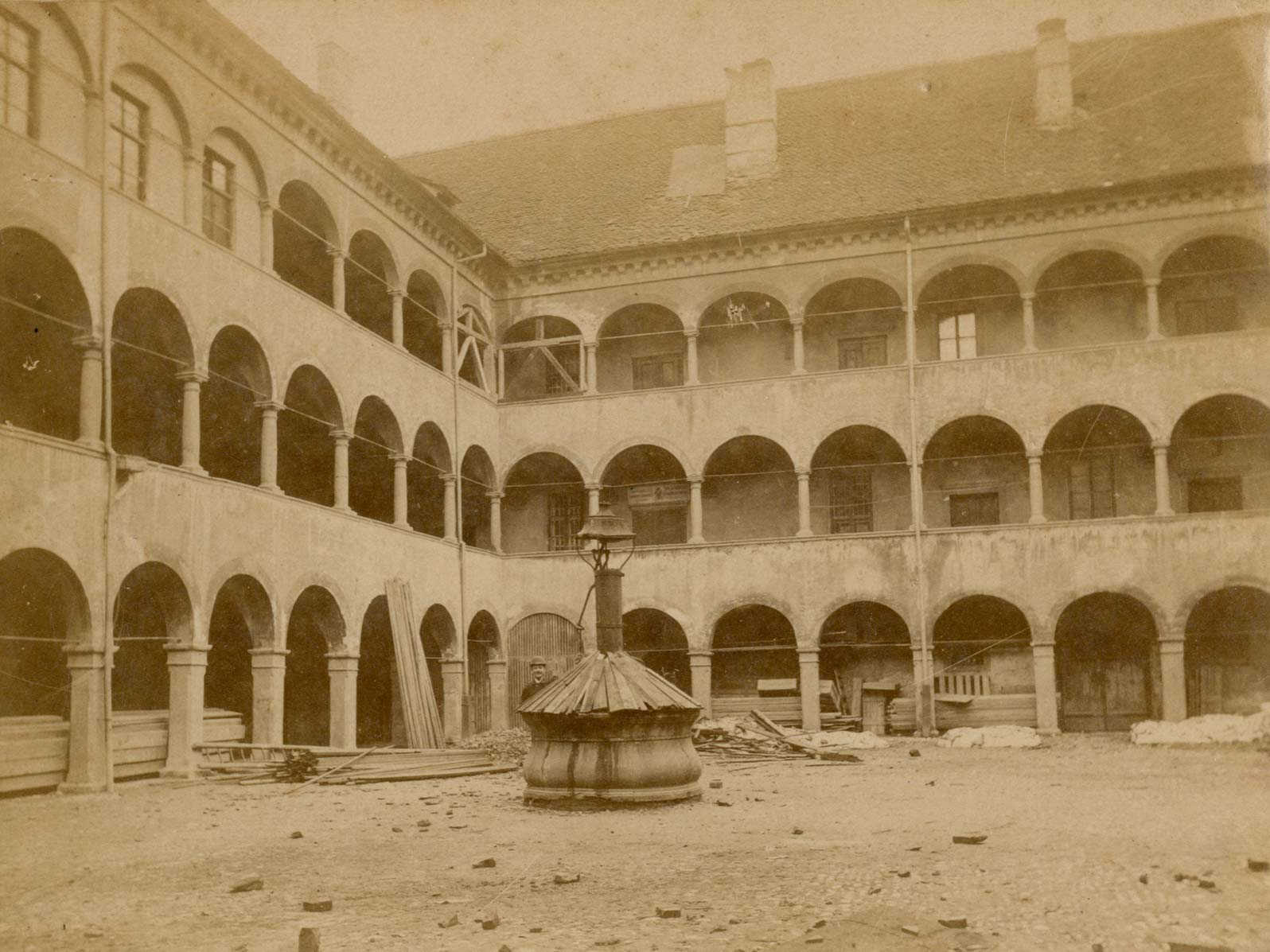
Princely Palace, Ljubljana: Senior princely line, destroyed 1895

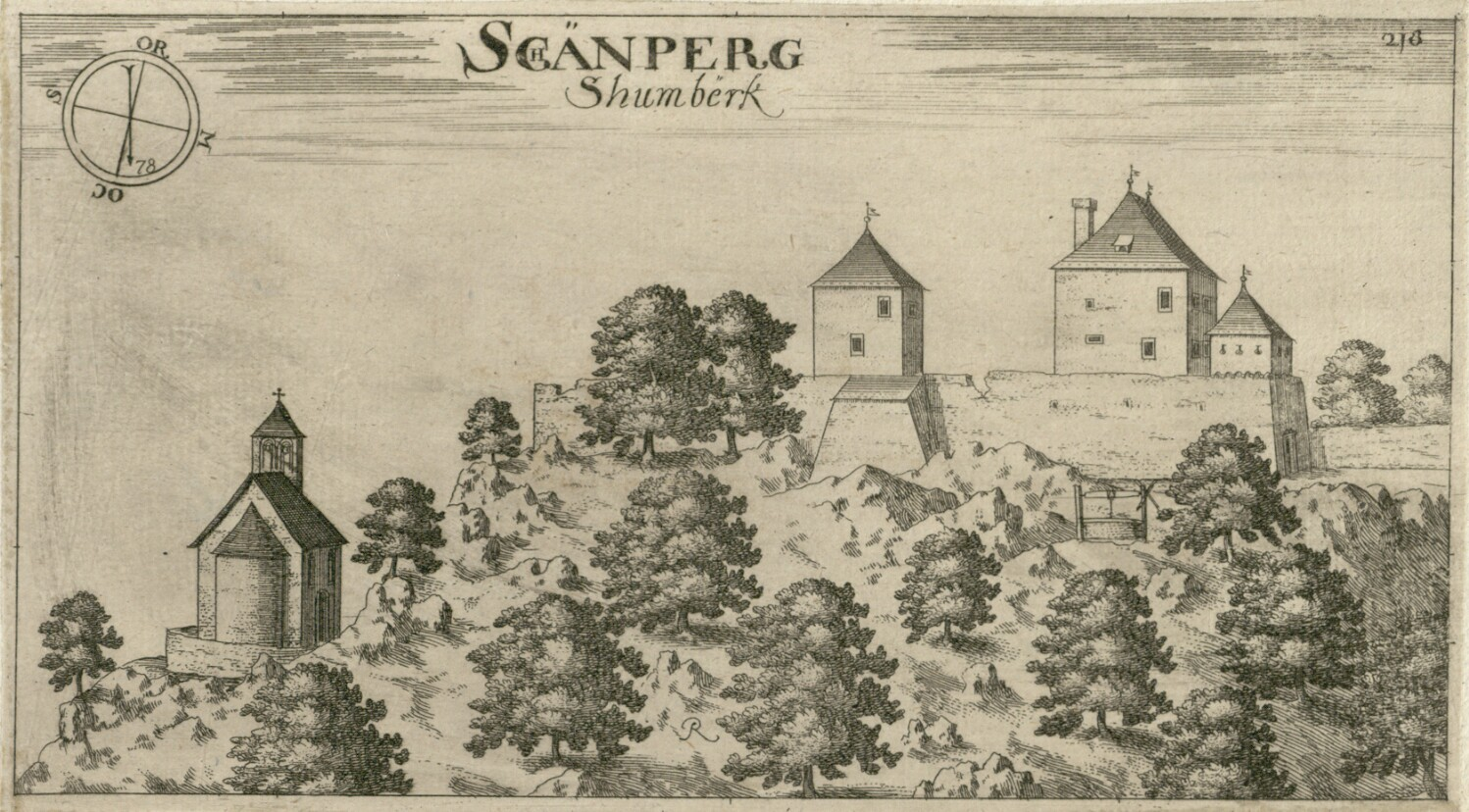
Schönberg Castle: Senior princely line, expropriated 1946

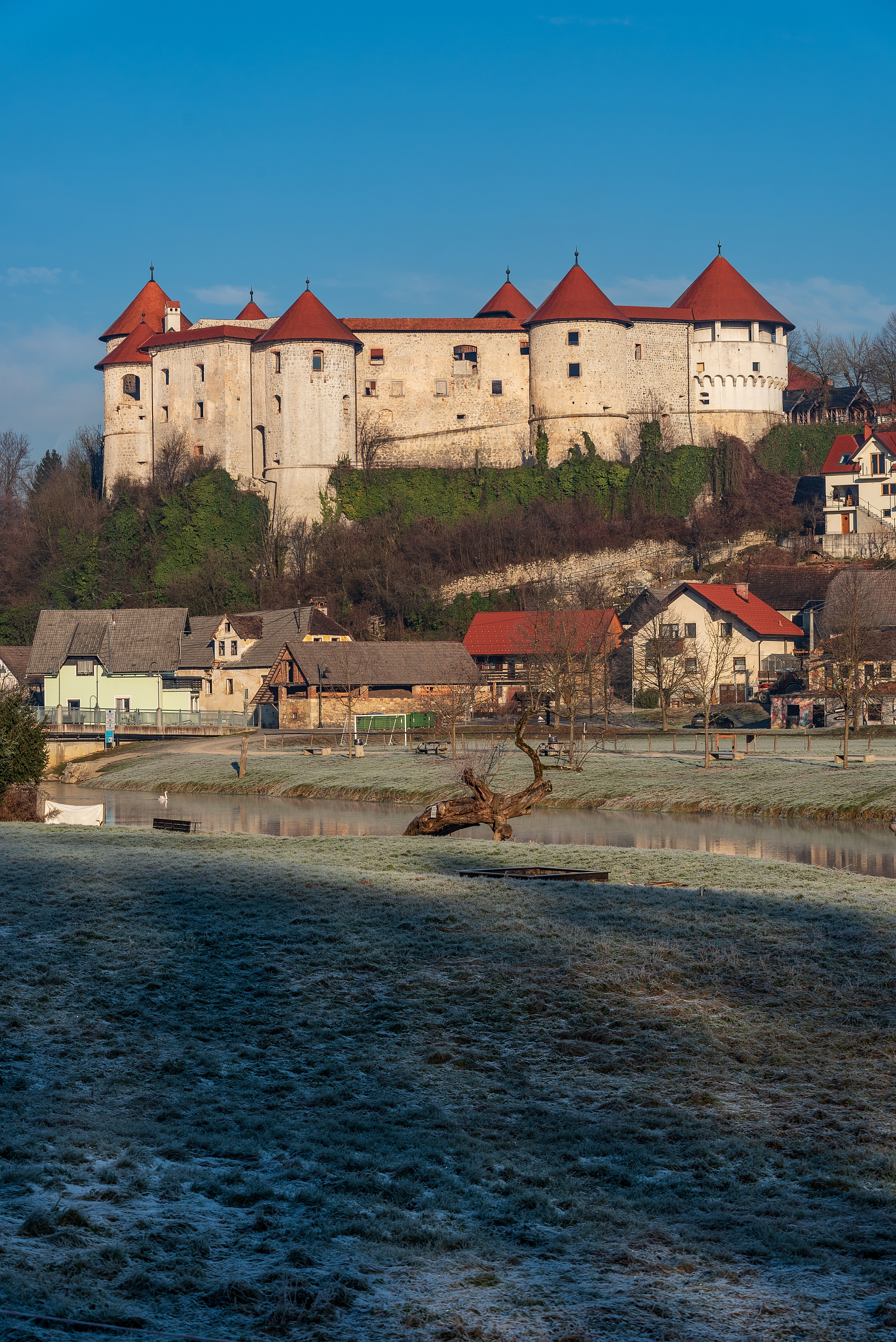
Seisenberg Castle: Senior princely line, expropriated 1945

=== Austria ===
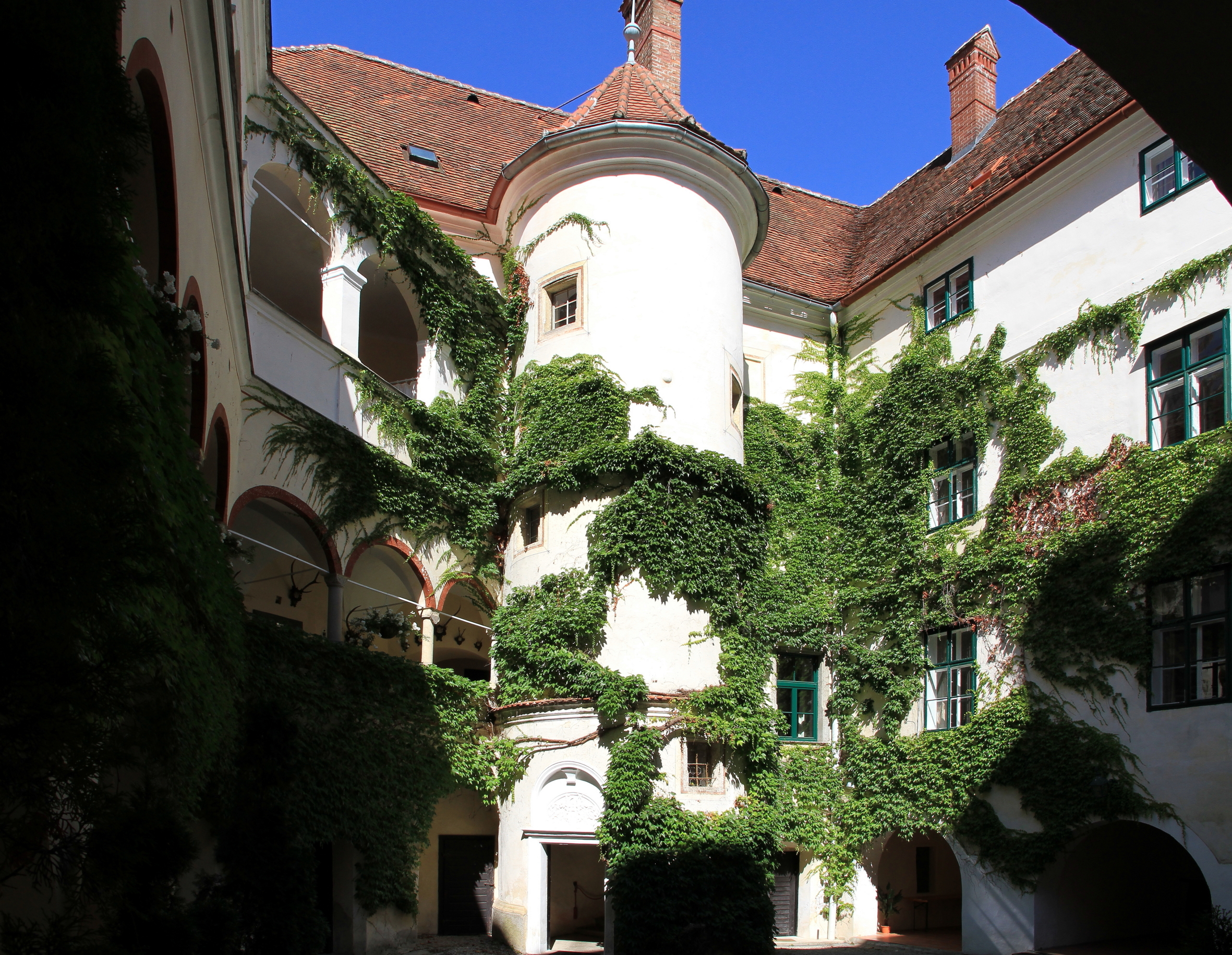
Ernegg Castle (Lower Austria): Comital branch, passed to female line 2012

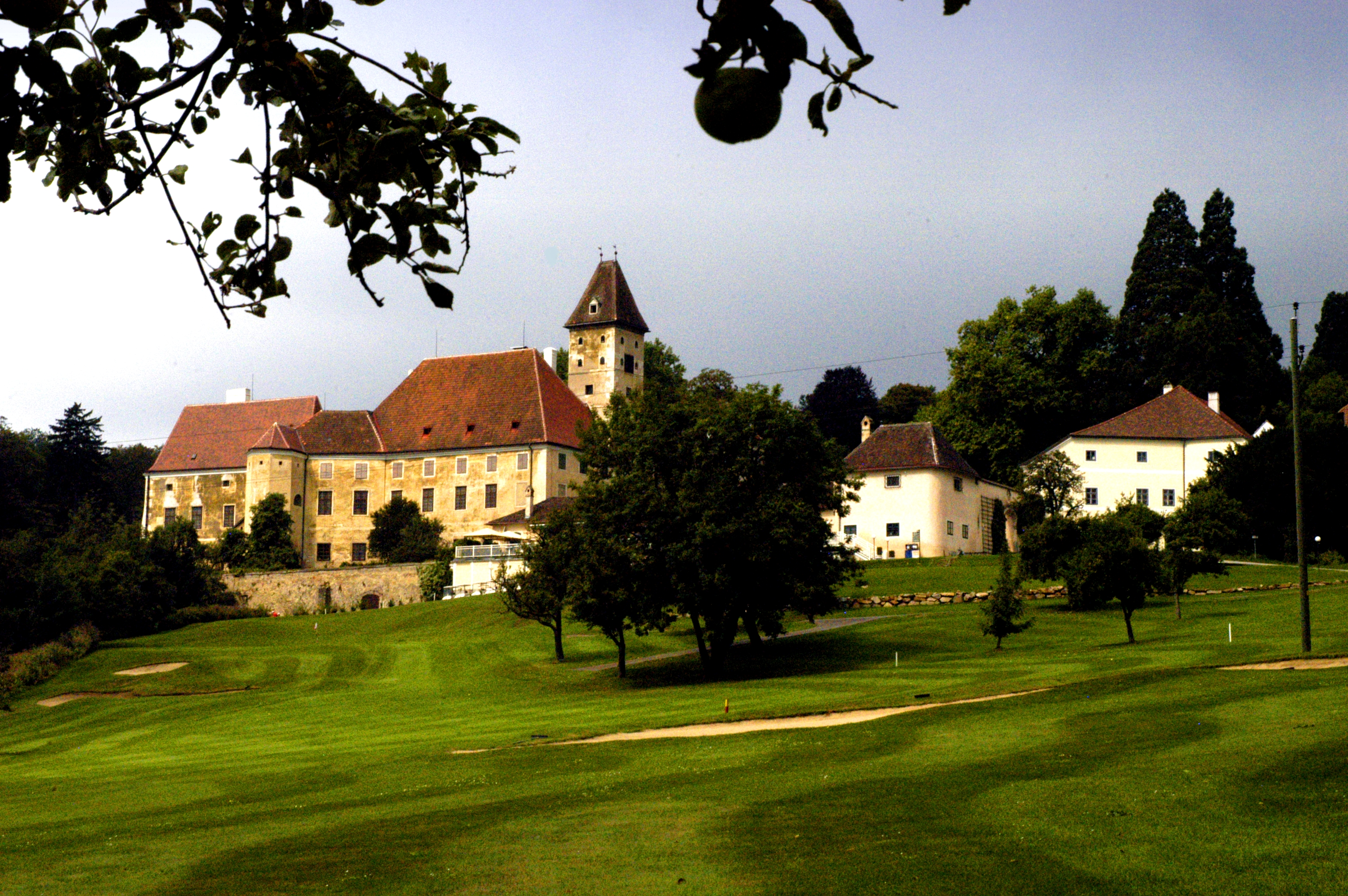
Goldegg Castle (Lower Austria): Princely cadet branch, passed to female line 2014

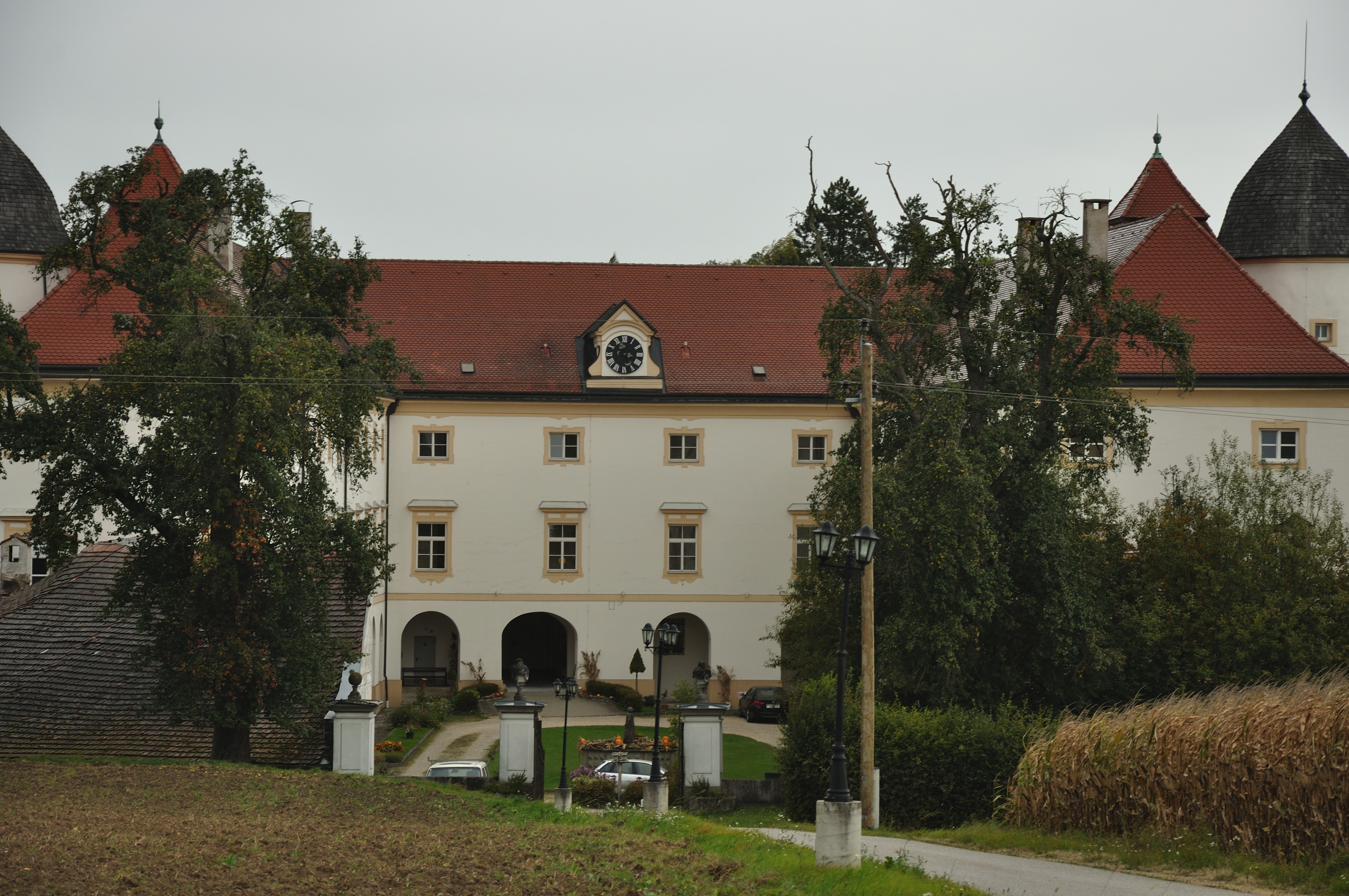
Losensteinleithen Castle (Upper Austria): Senior princely line, sold 1954

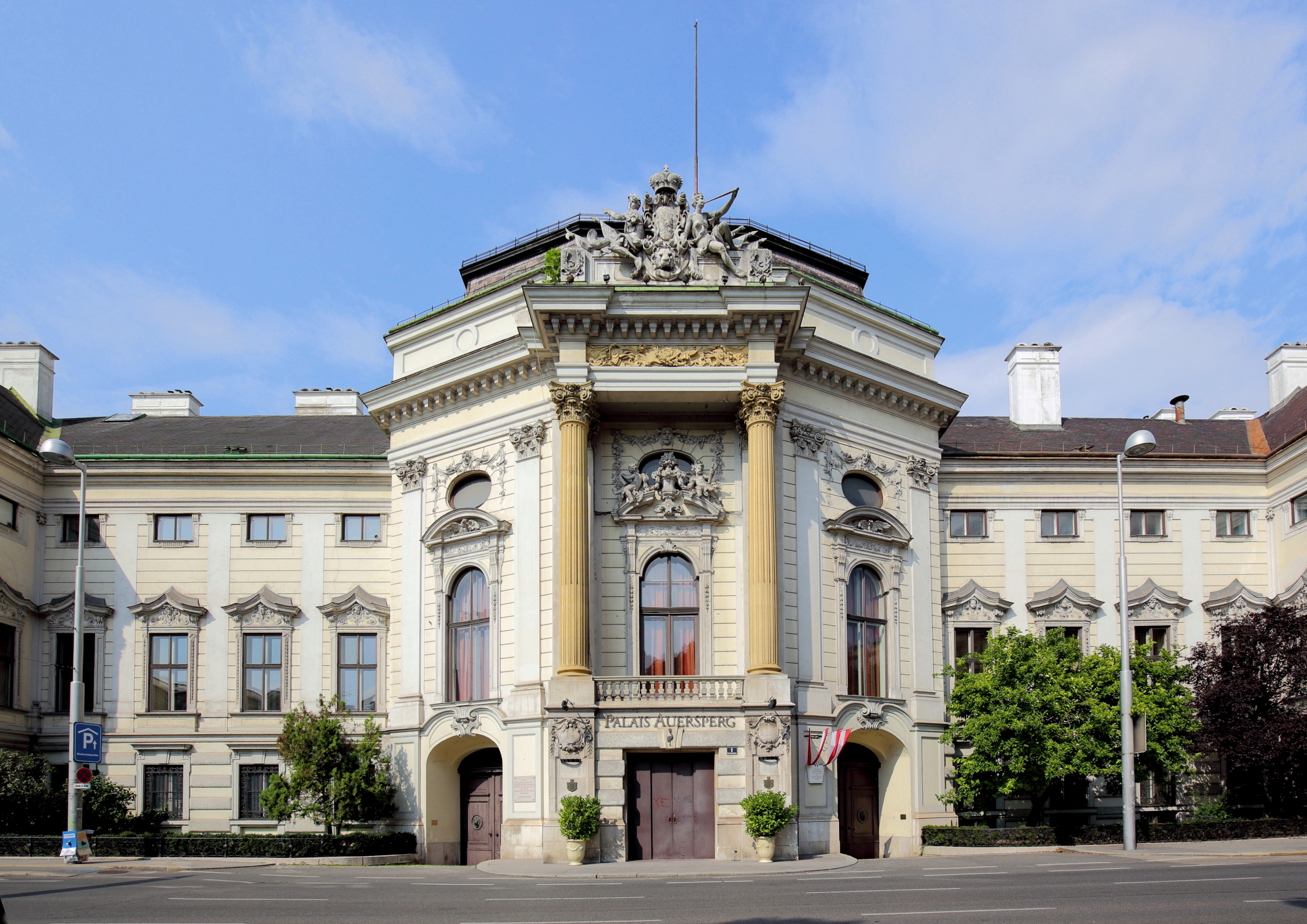
Palais Auersperg (Vienna): Princely cadet branch, passed to female line 1942, sold 1953

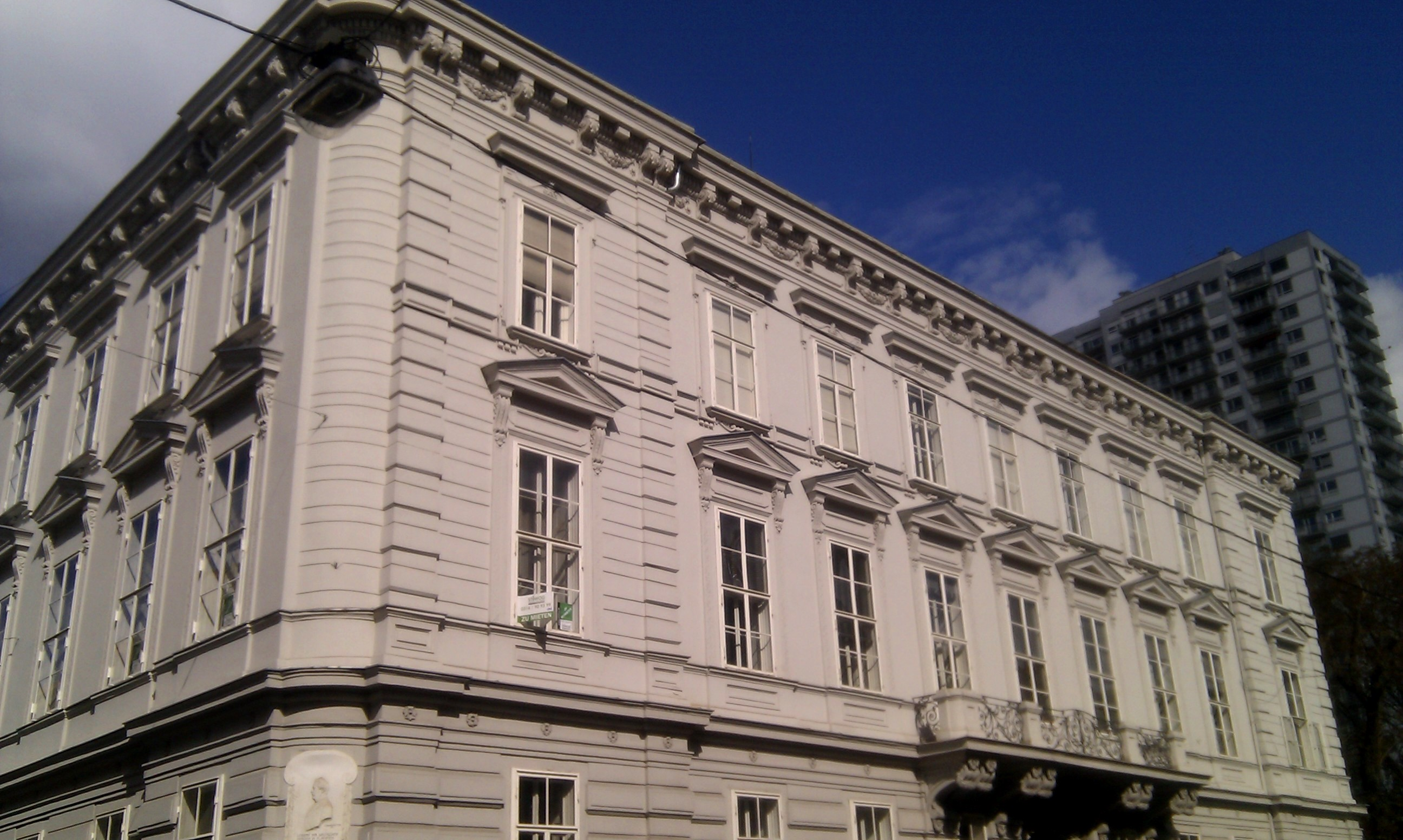
Palais Auersperg (Graz): Comital branch, sold c. 1881

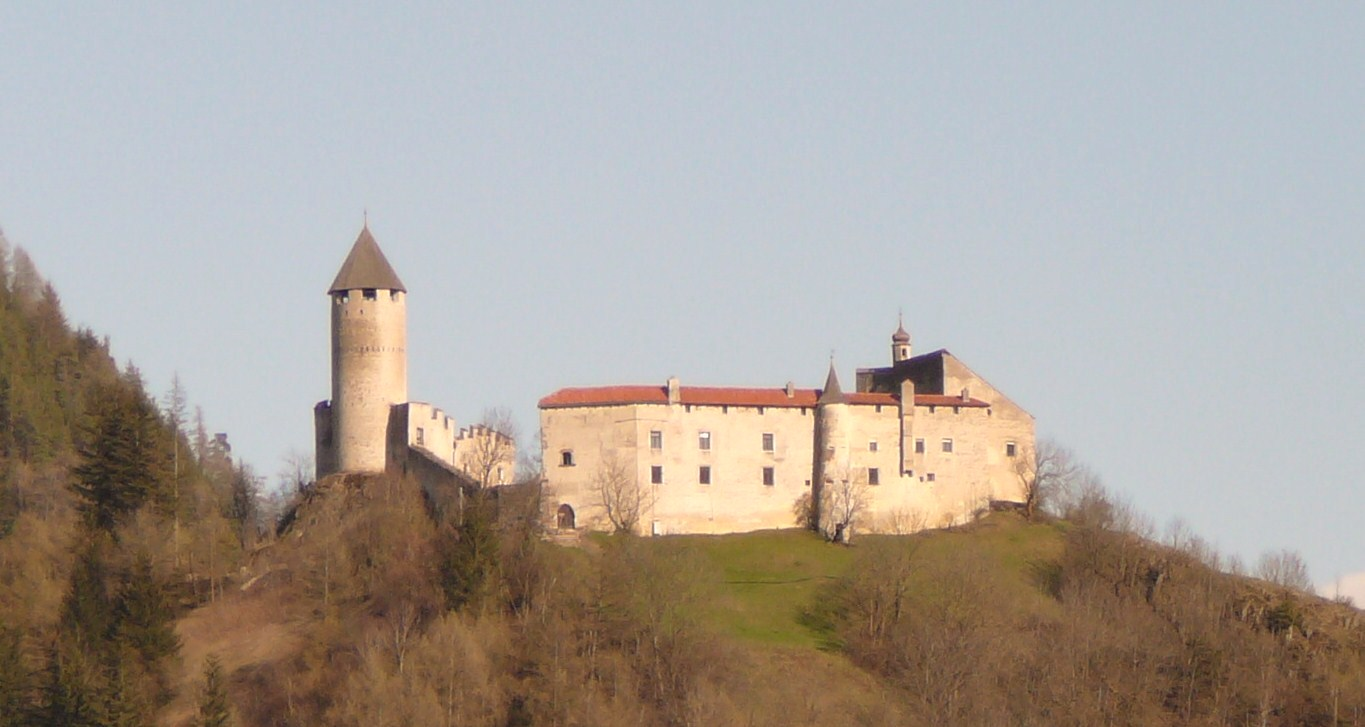
Sprechenstein Castle (Tyrol): Auersperg-Trautson branch, since 1775

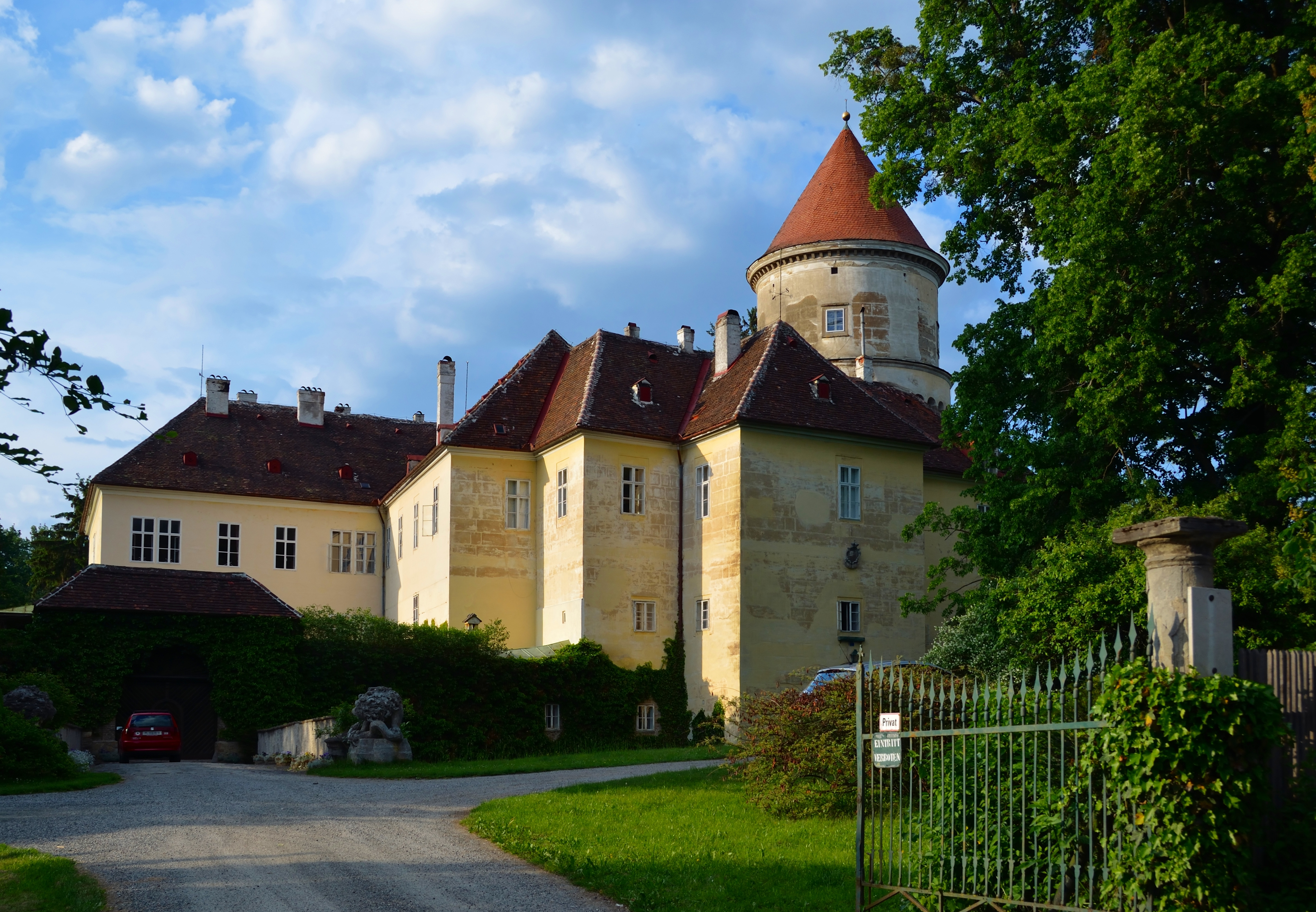
Wald Castle (Lower Austria): Auersperg-Breunner branch, since 1930

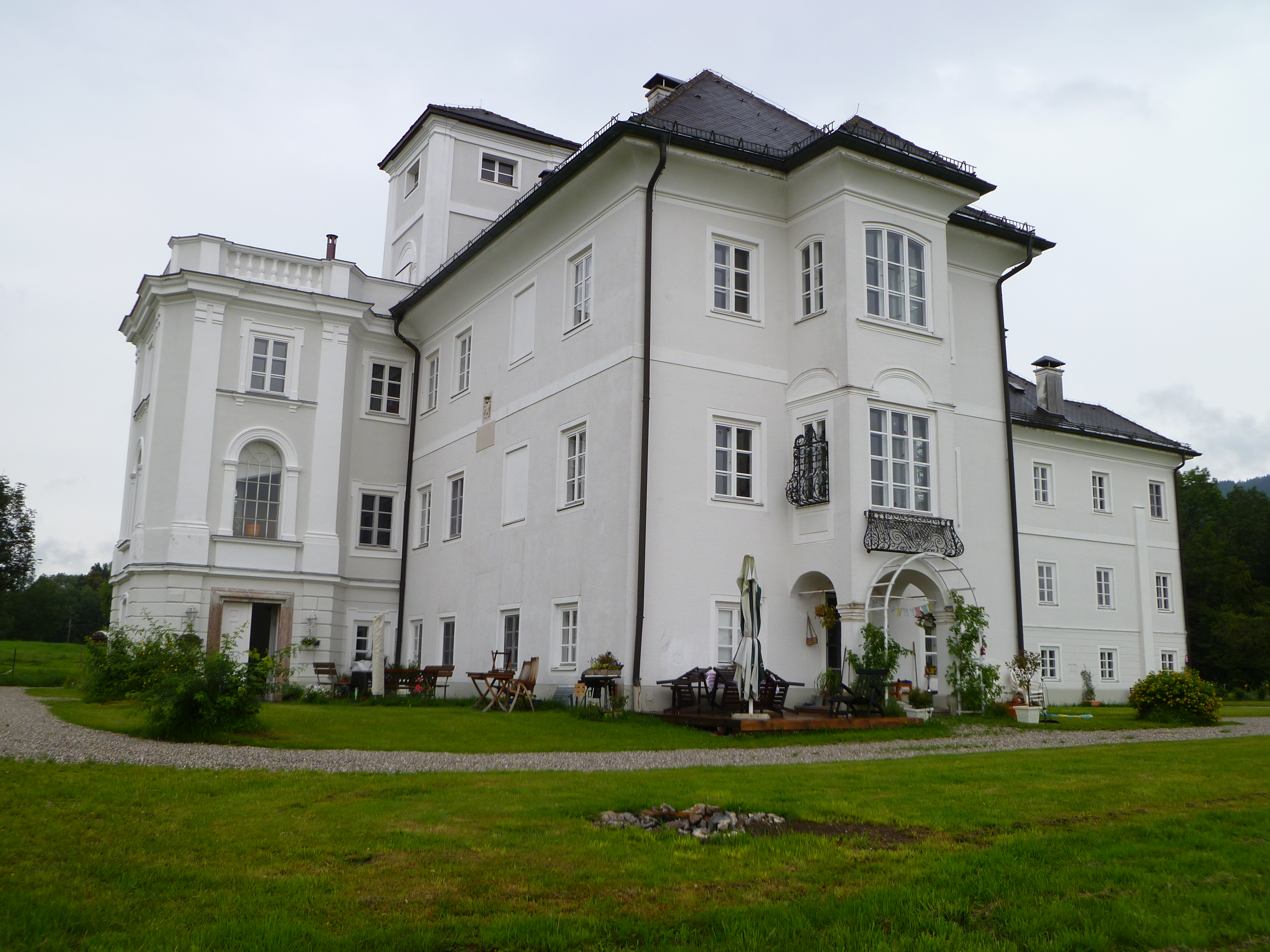
Weitwörth Castle (Salzburg): Auersperg-Trautson branch, since 1864

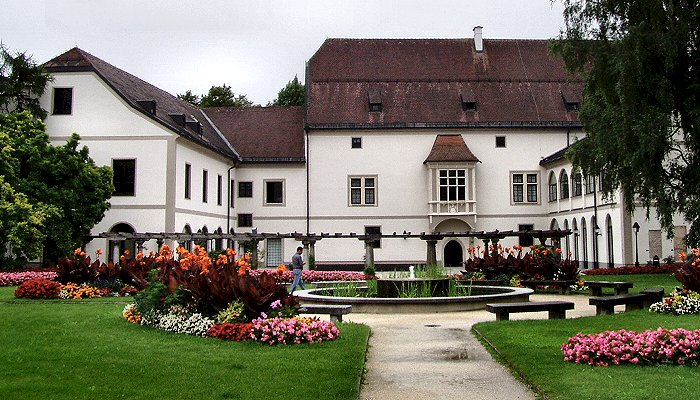
Wels Castle (Upper Austria): Senior princely line, sold 1865

=== Bohemia and other regions ===
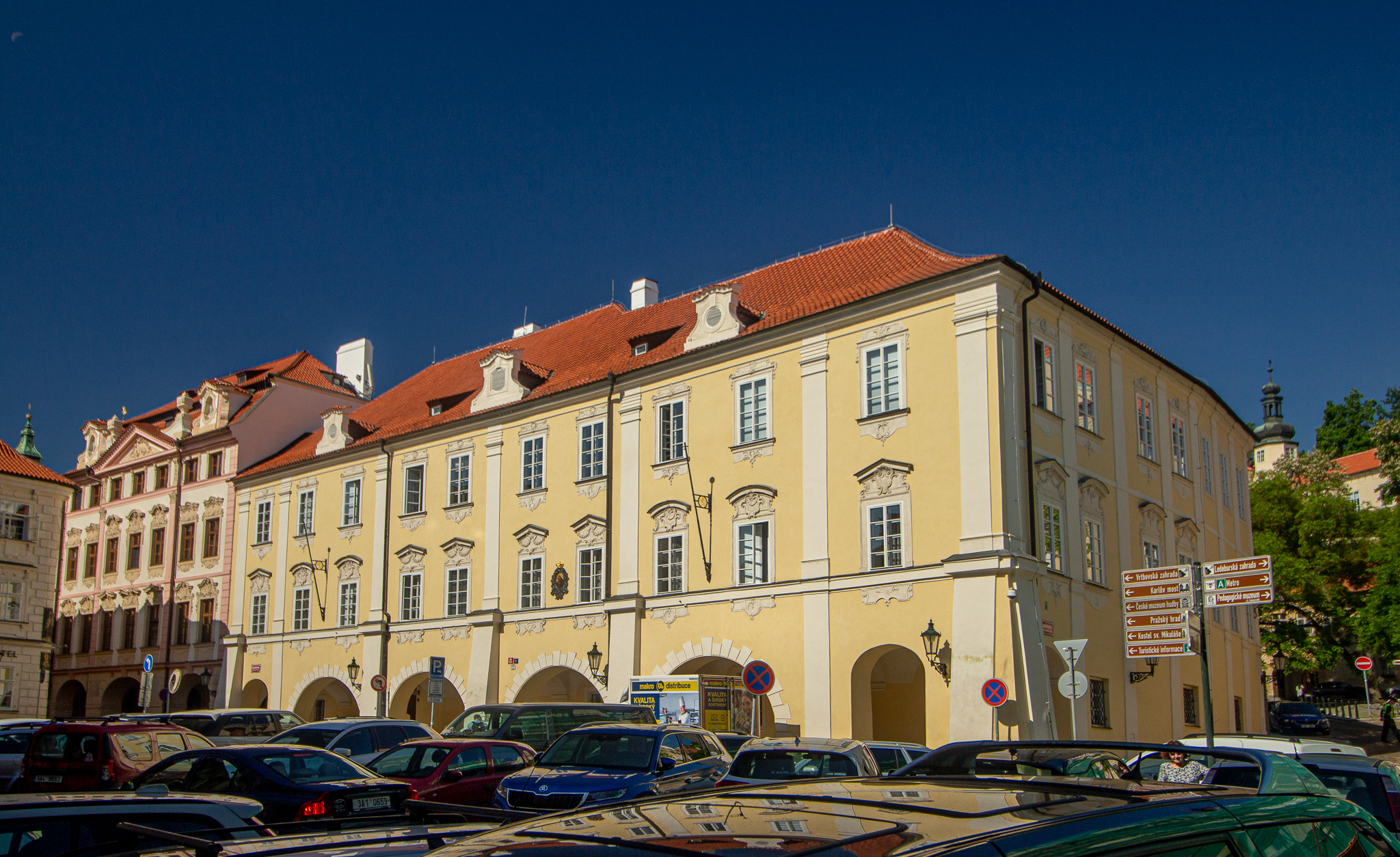
Auersperg Palace (Prague): Senior princely line, sold 1904

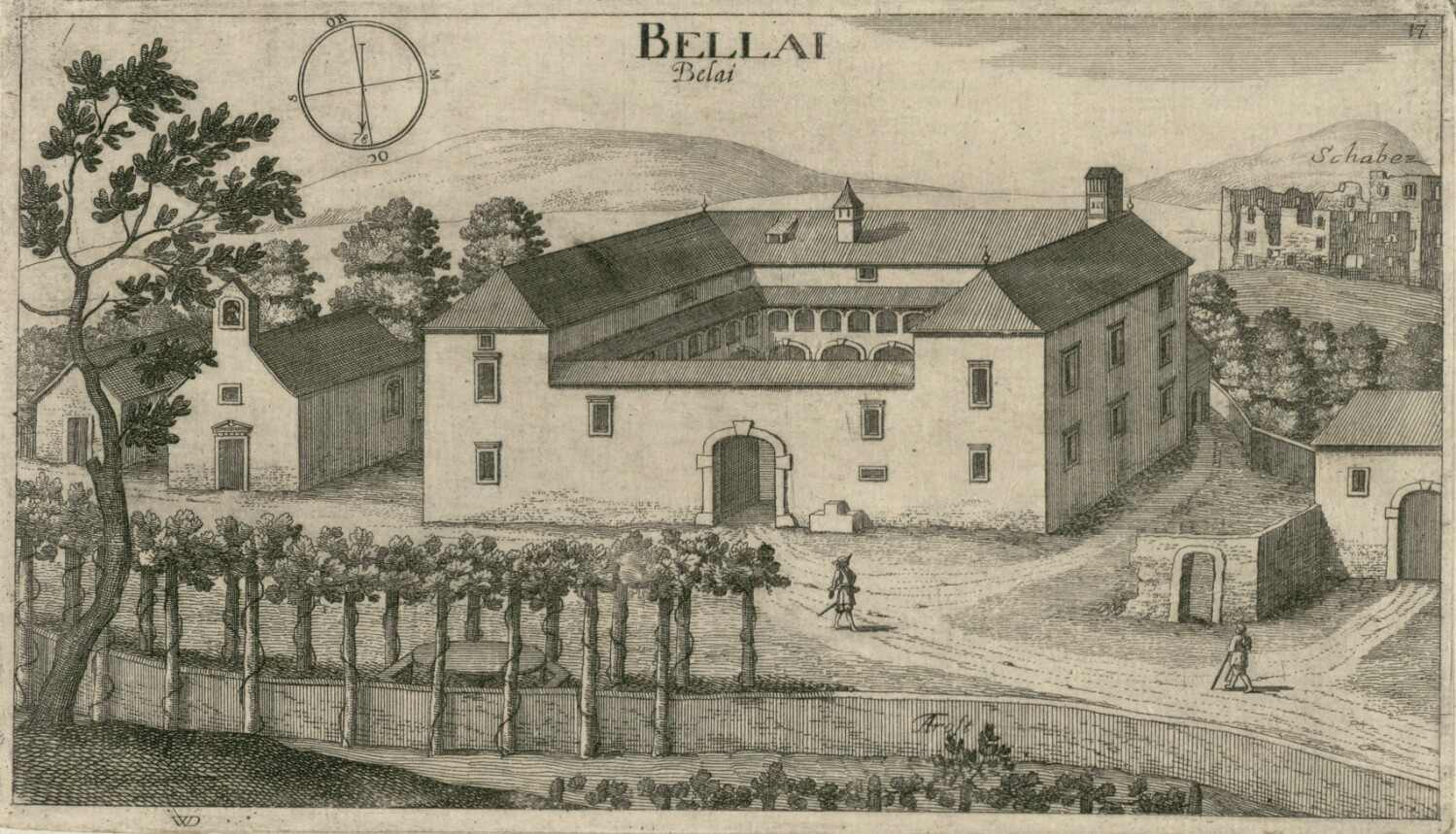
Belaj Castle (Istria): Senior princely line, expropriated 1945

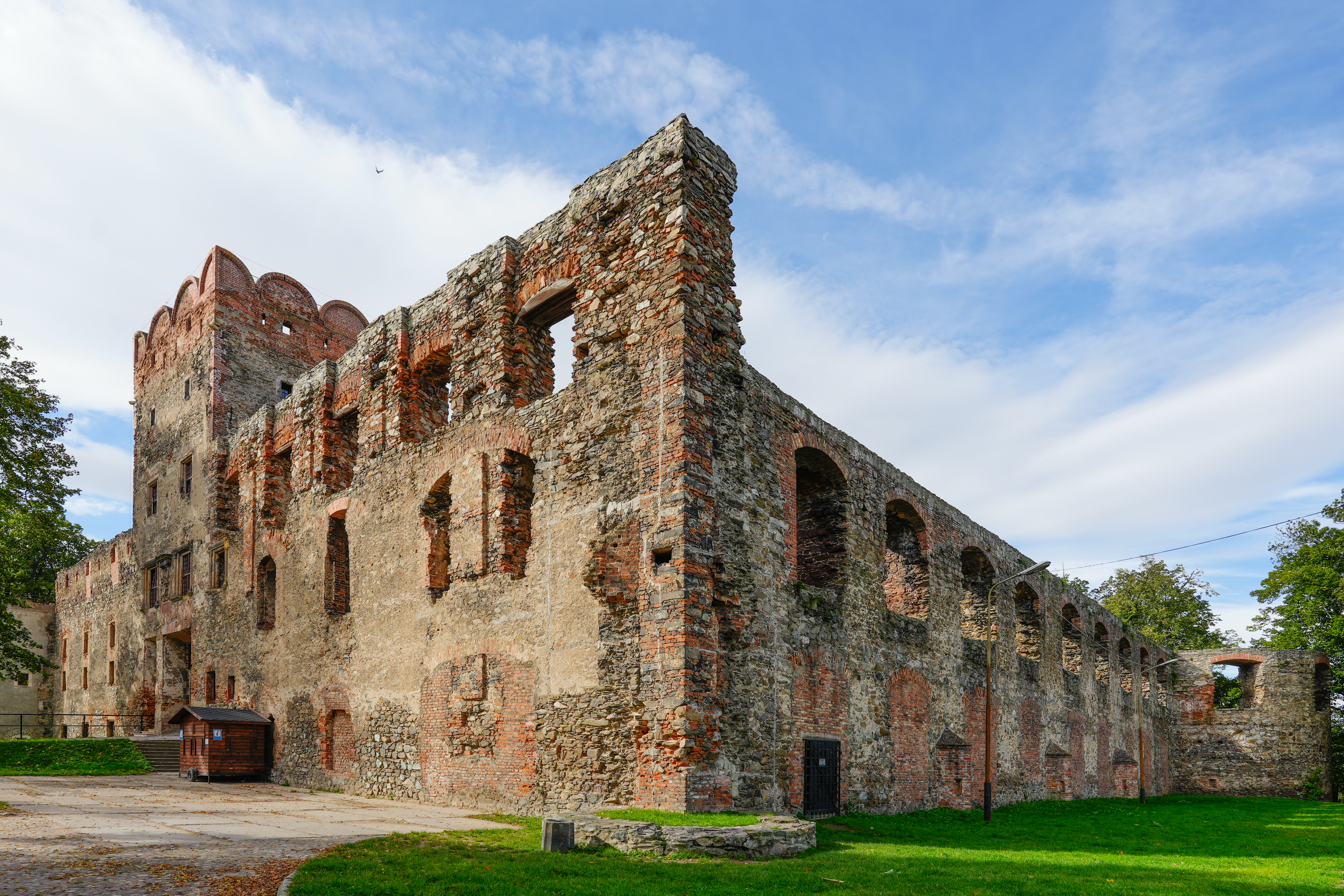
Frankenstein Castle, Silesia: Seat of the Duchy of Münsterberg, sold to Prussia 1791

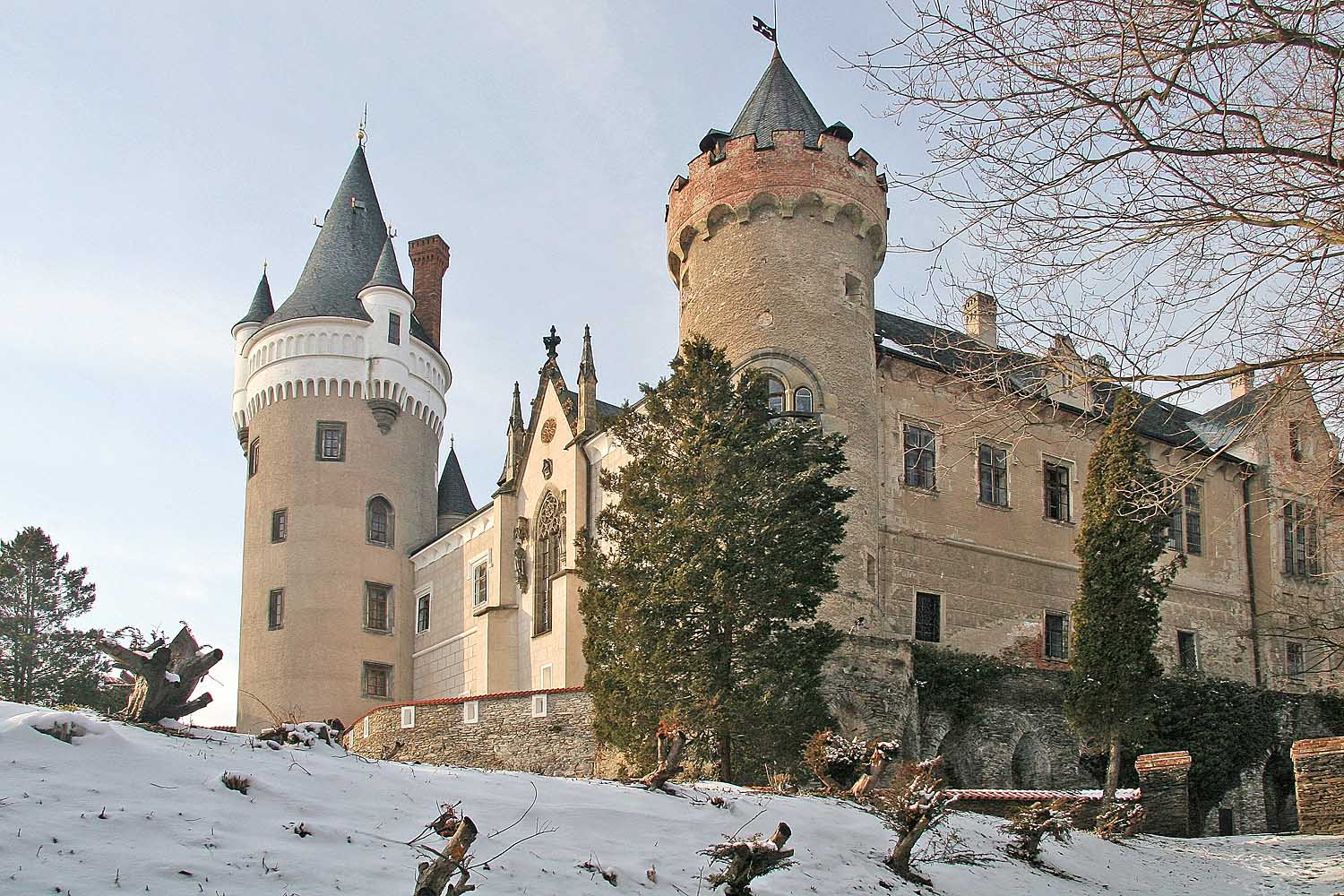
Žleby Castle (Bohemia): Princely cadet branch, passed to female line 1942, expropriated 1945

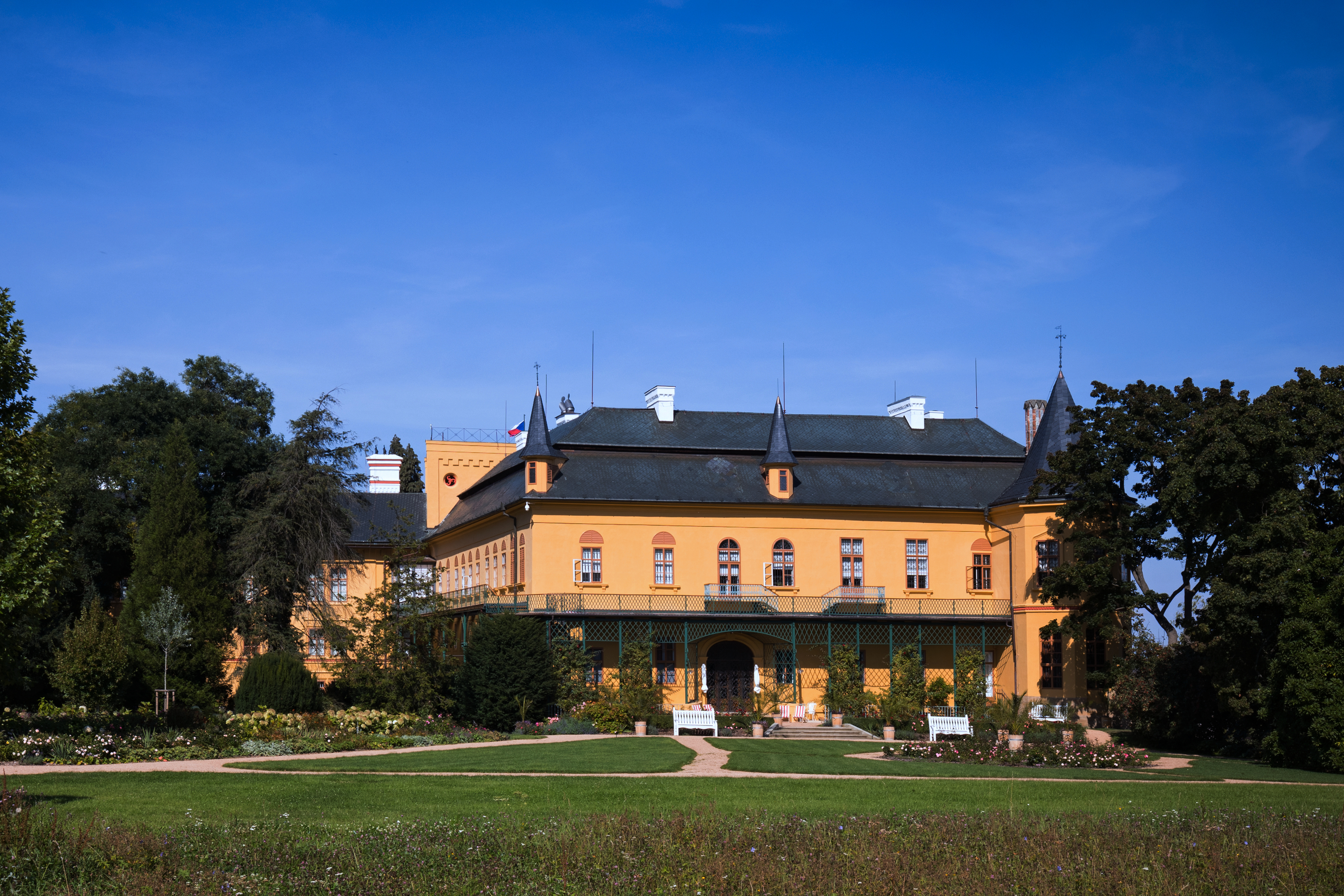
Slatiňany Castle (Bohemia): Princely cadet branch, passed to female line 1942, expropriated 1945

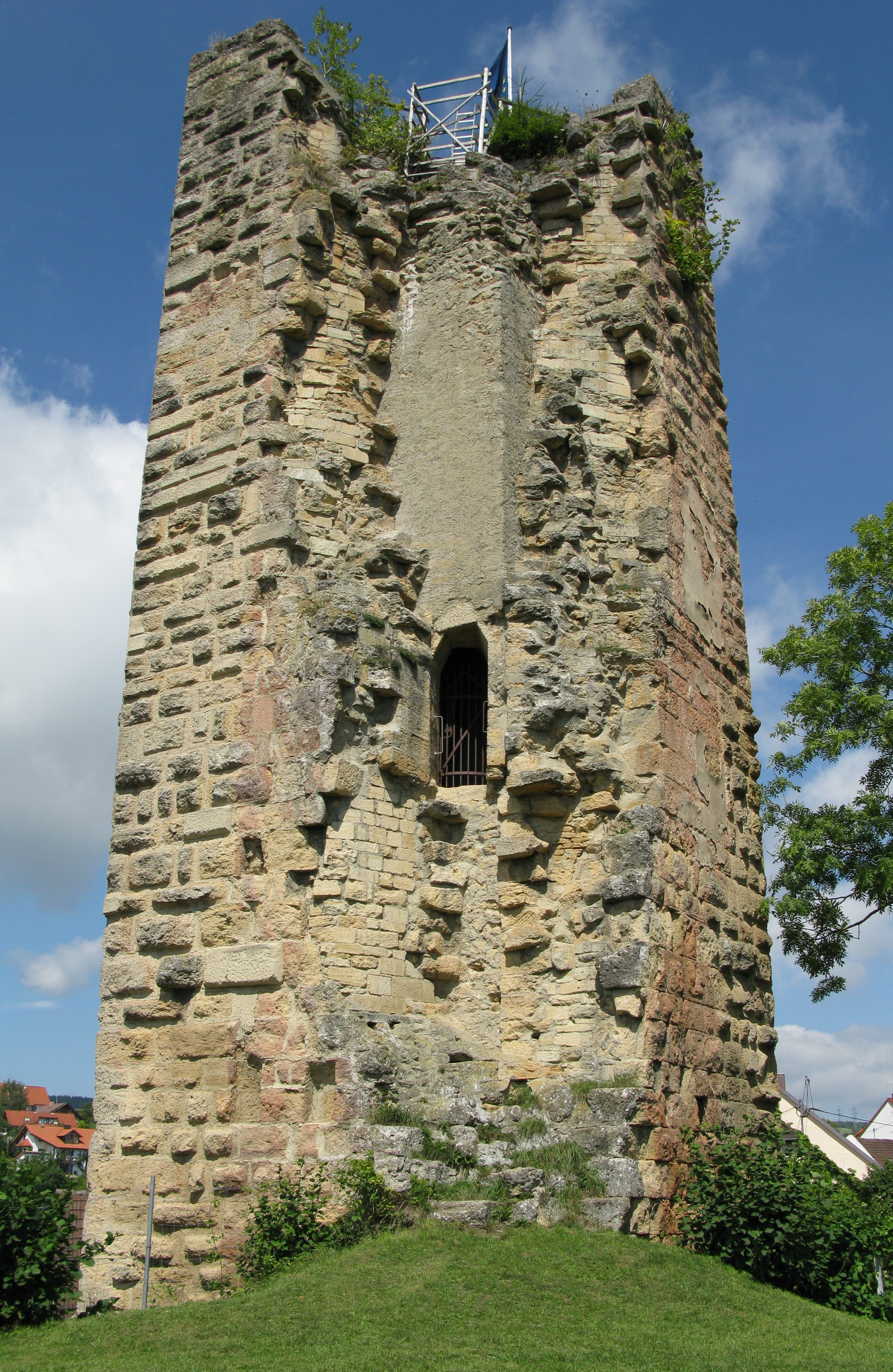
Tengen Castle (Swabia): Immediate princely seat, mediatised 1806

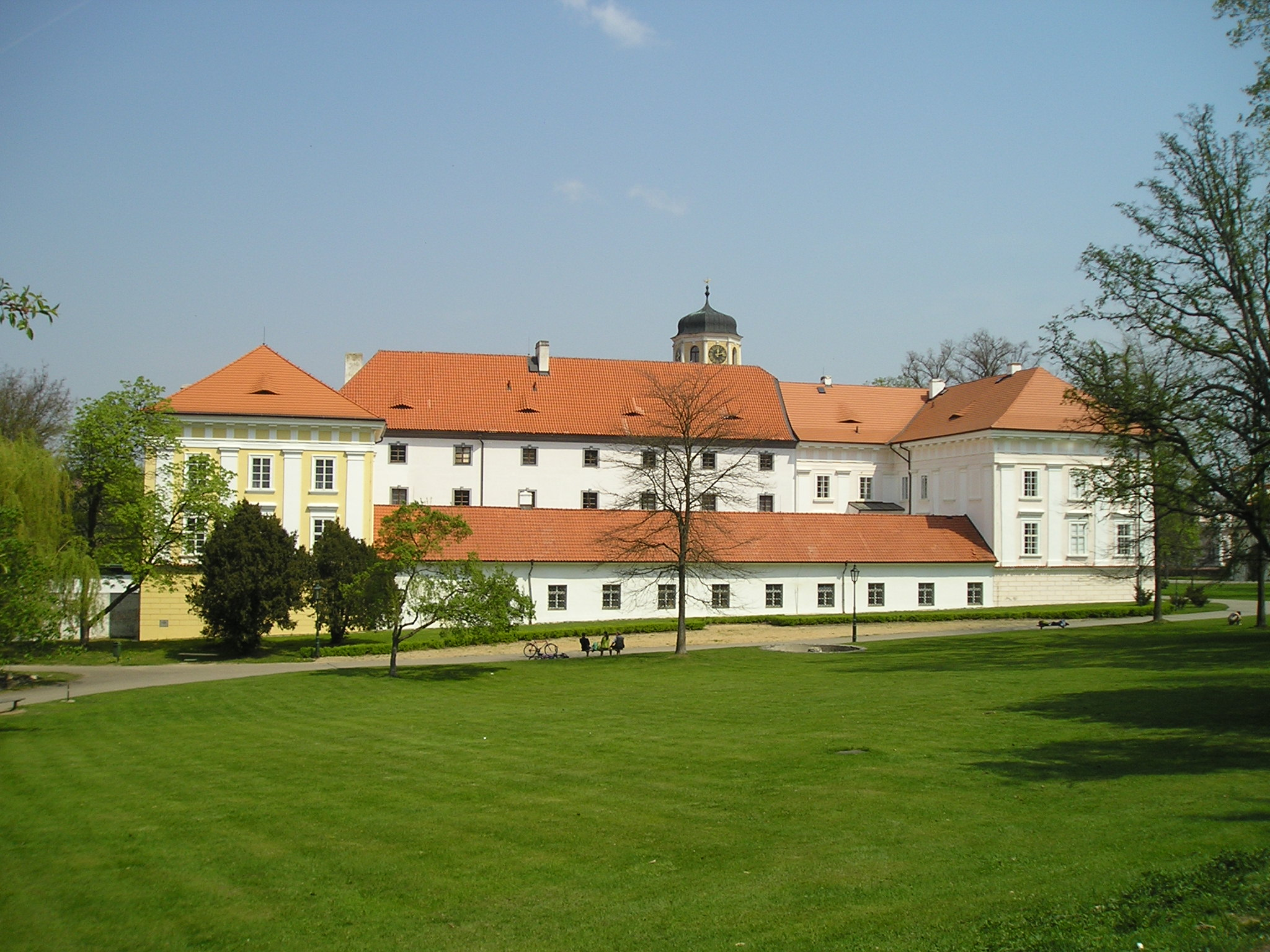
Vlašim Castle (Bohemia): Auersperg-Breunner branch, expropriated 1945

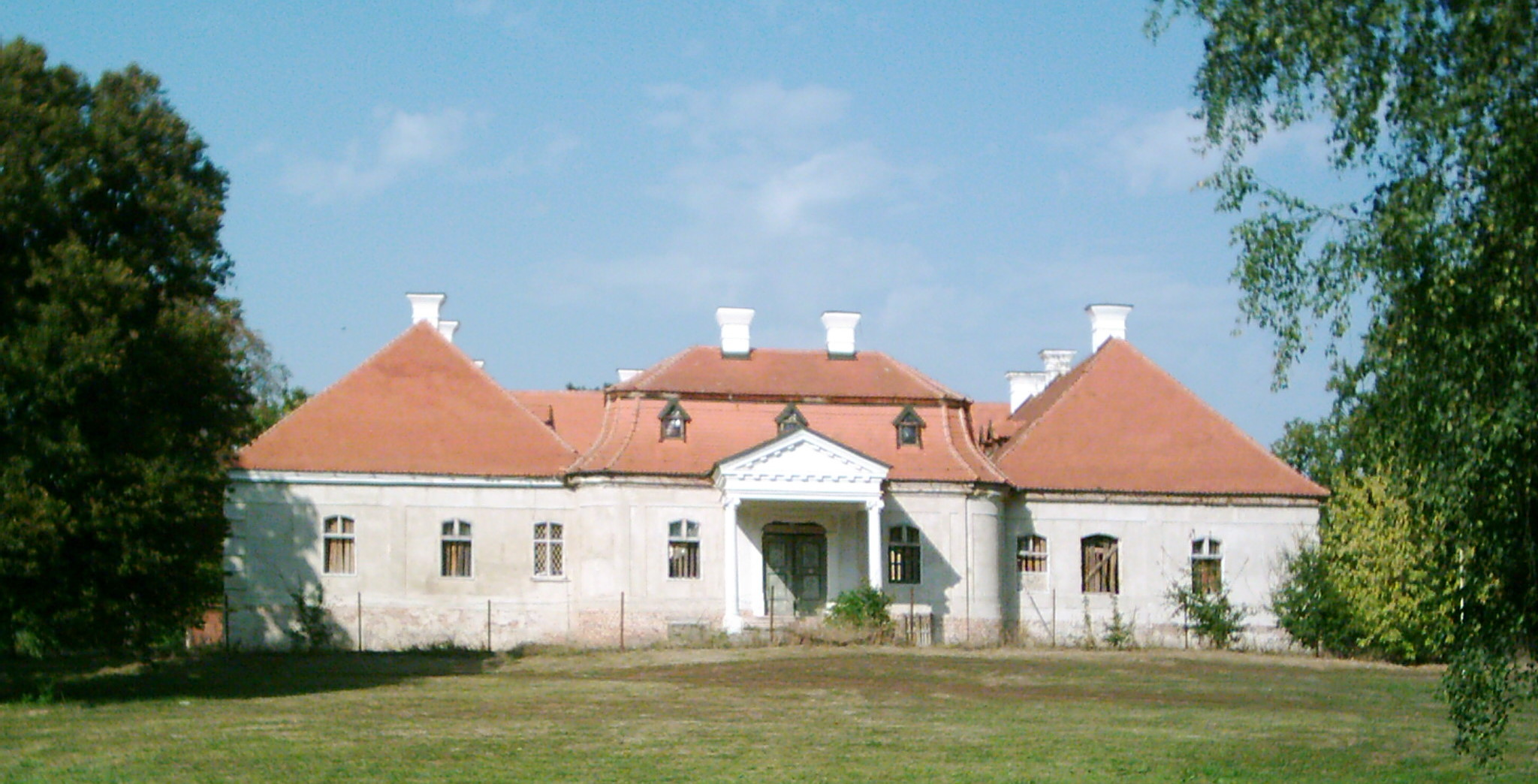
Zselís Castle (Želiezovce): Auersperg-Breunner branch, expropriated 1945

== Gallery ==
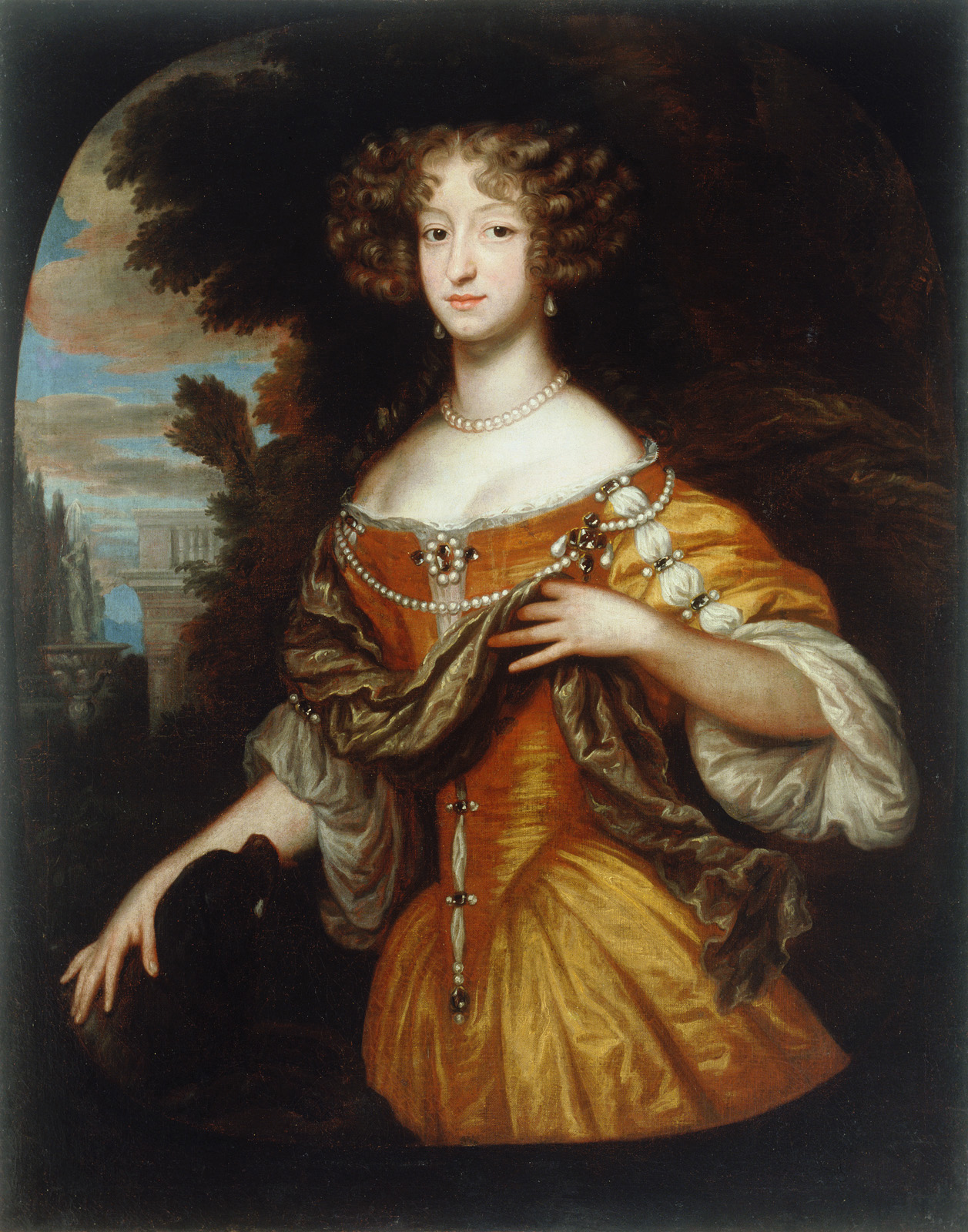
Countess Catherine Elizabeth von Auersperg, 1670s

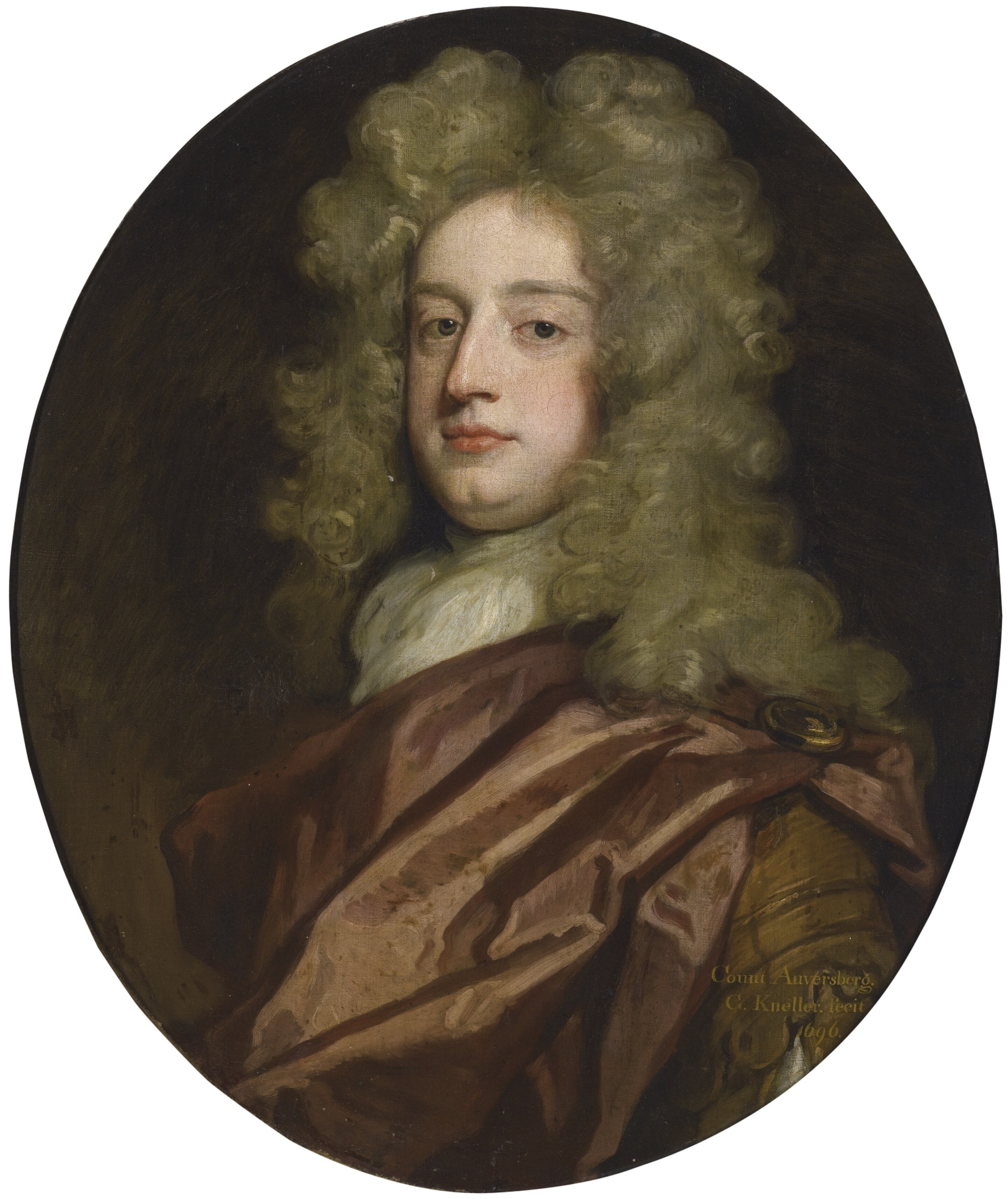
Count Leopold von Auersperg by Sir Godfrey Kneller, 1696

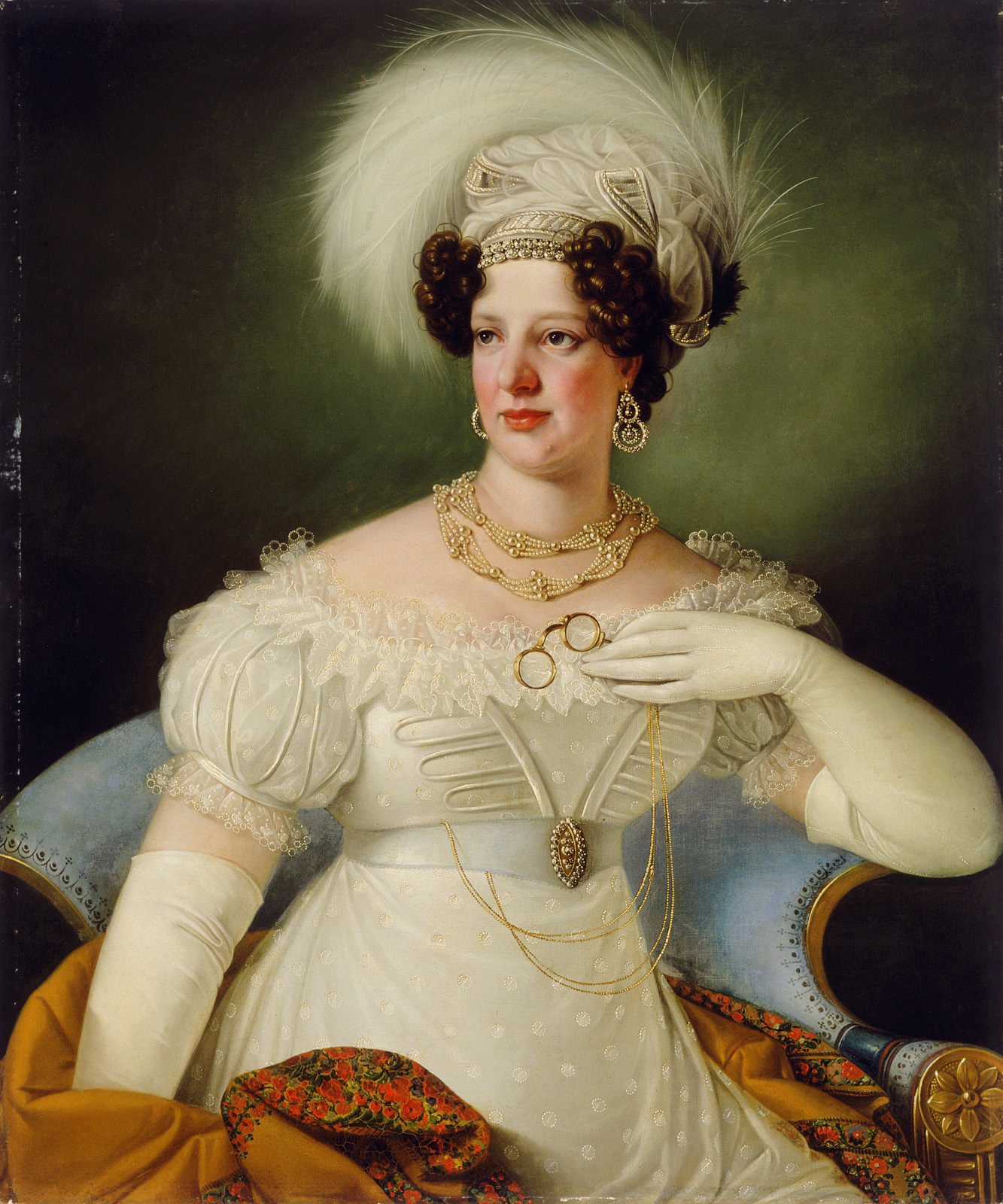
Portrait of Countess Cecilia of Auersperg, by Giuseppe Tominz, 1822

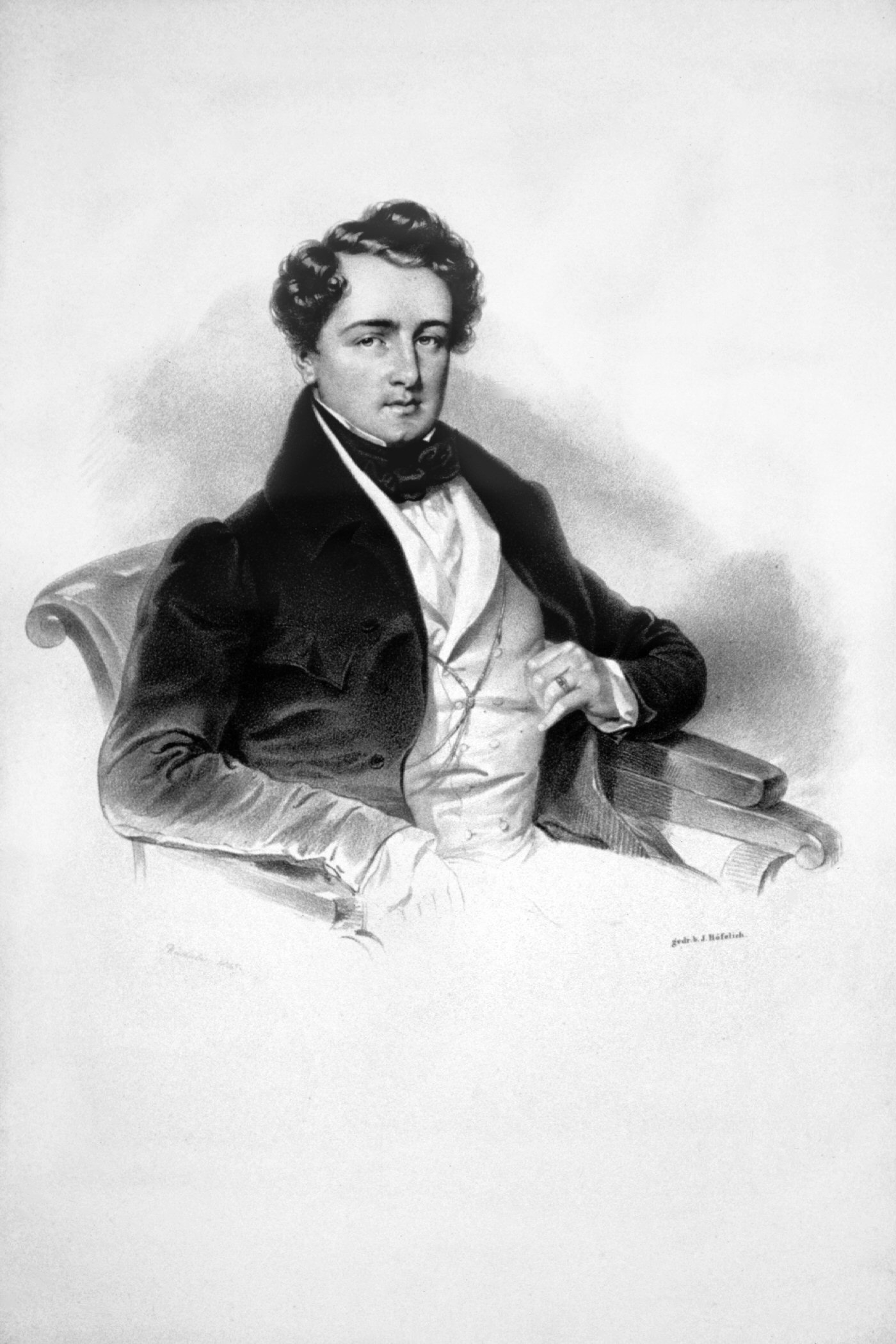
Lithograph of Vincenz Karl von Auersperg, by Josef Kriehuber, 1834

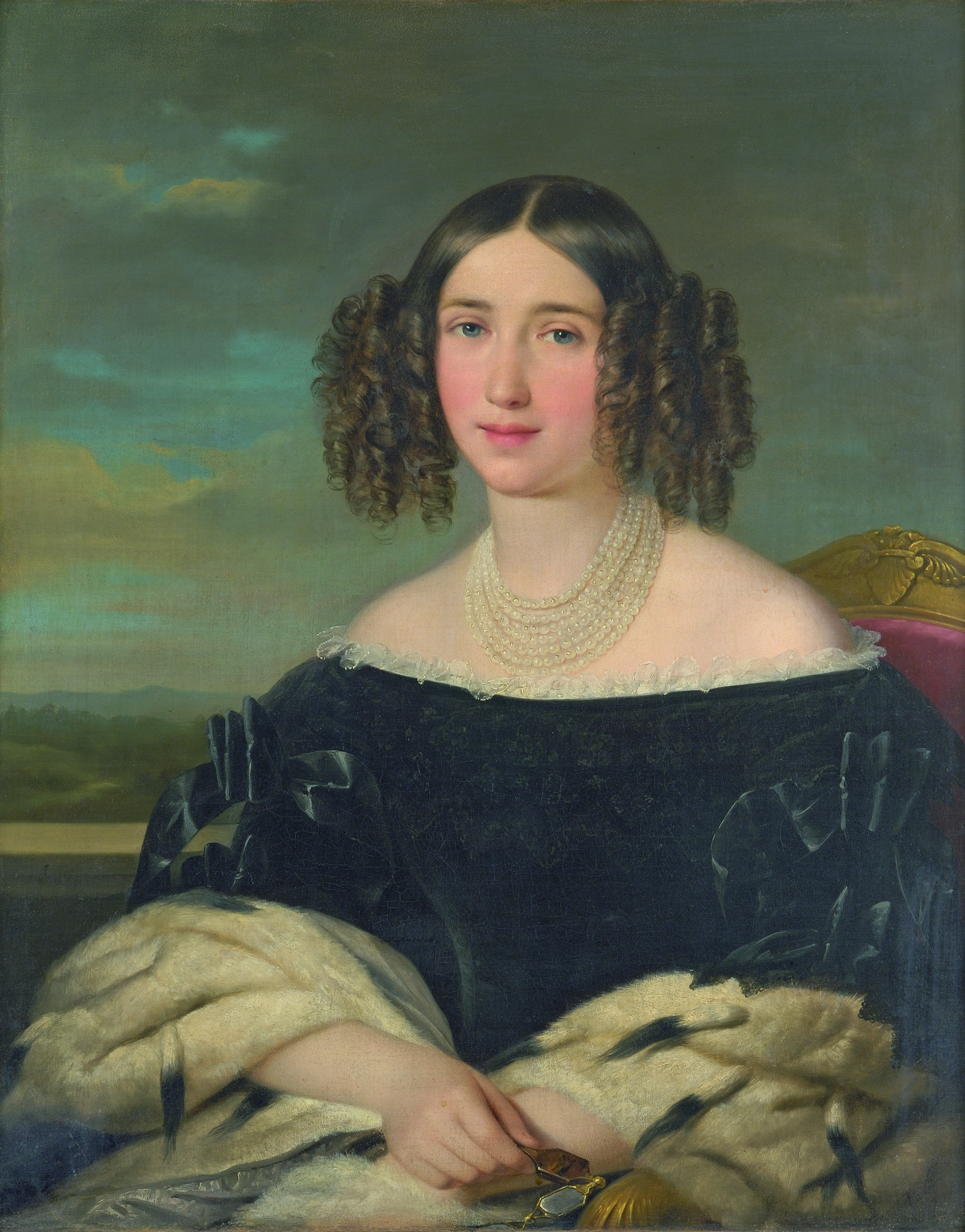
Countess Wilhelmine von Auersperg, by Franz Schrotzberg, 1847

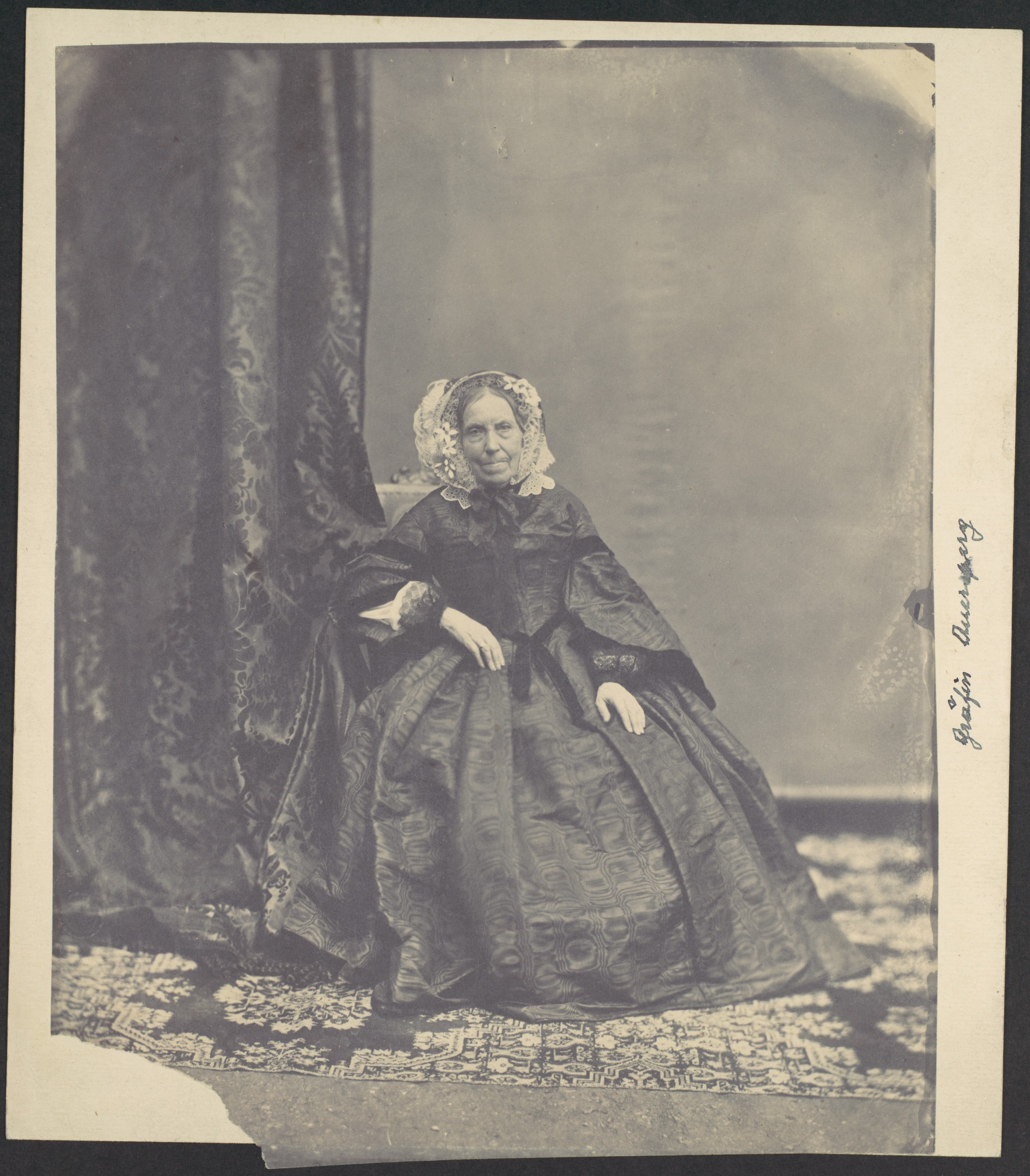
Countess Auersperg, 1850s–60s

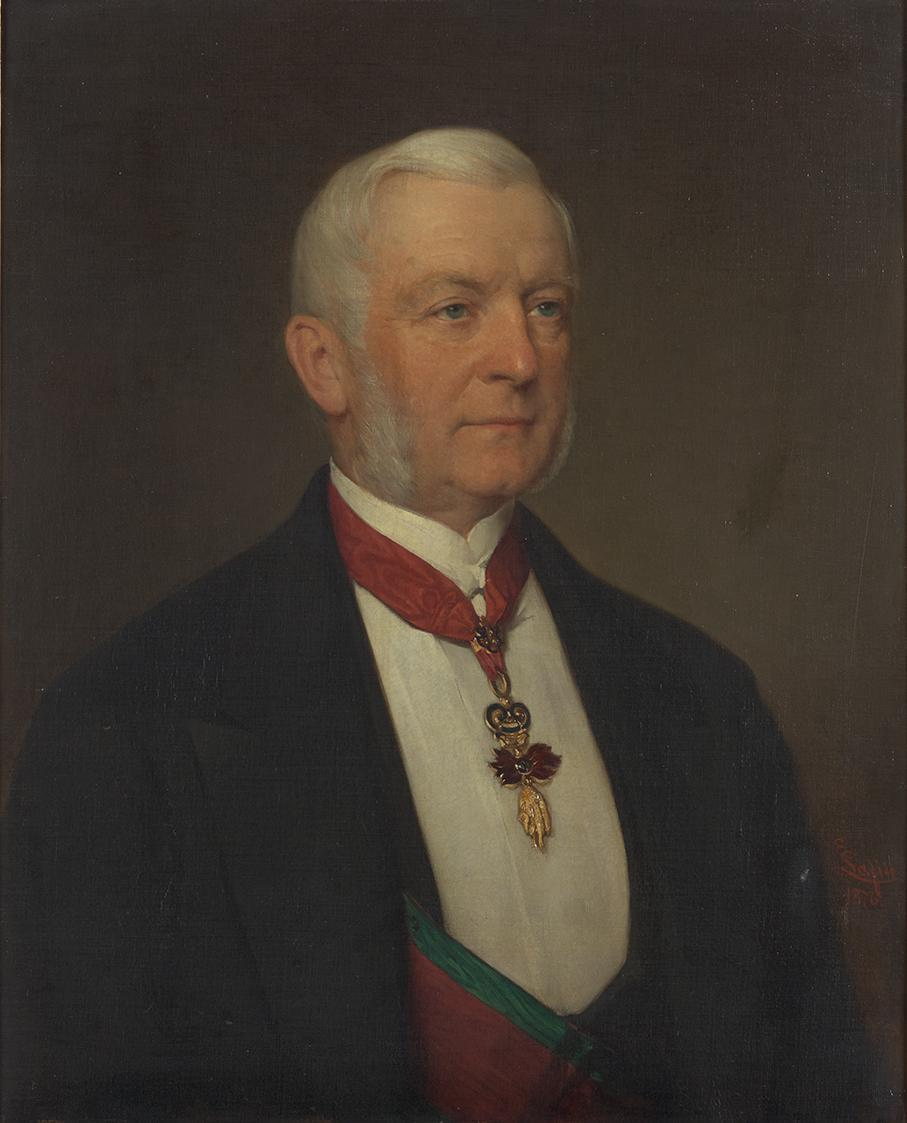
Prince Karl of Auersperg, 1876

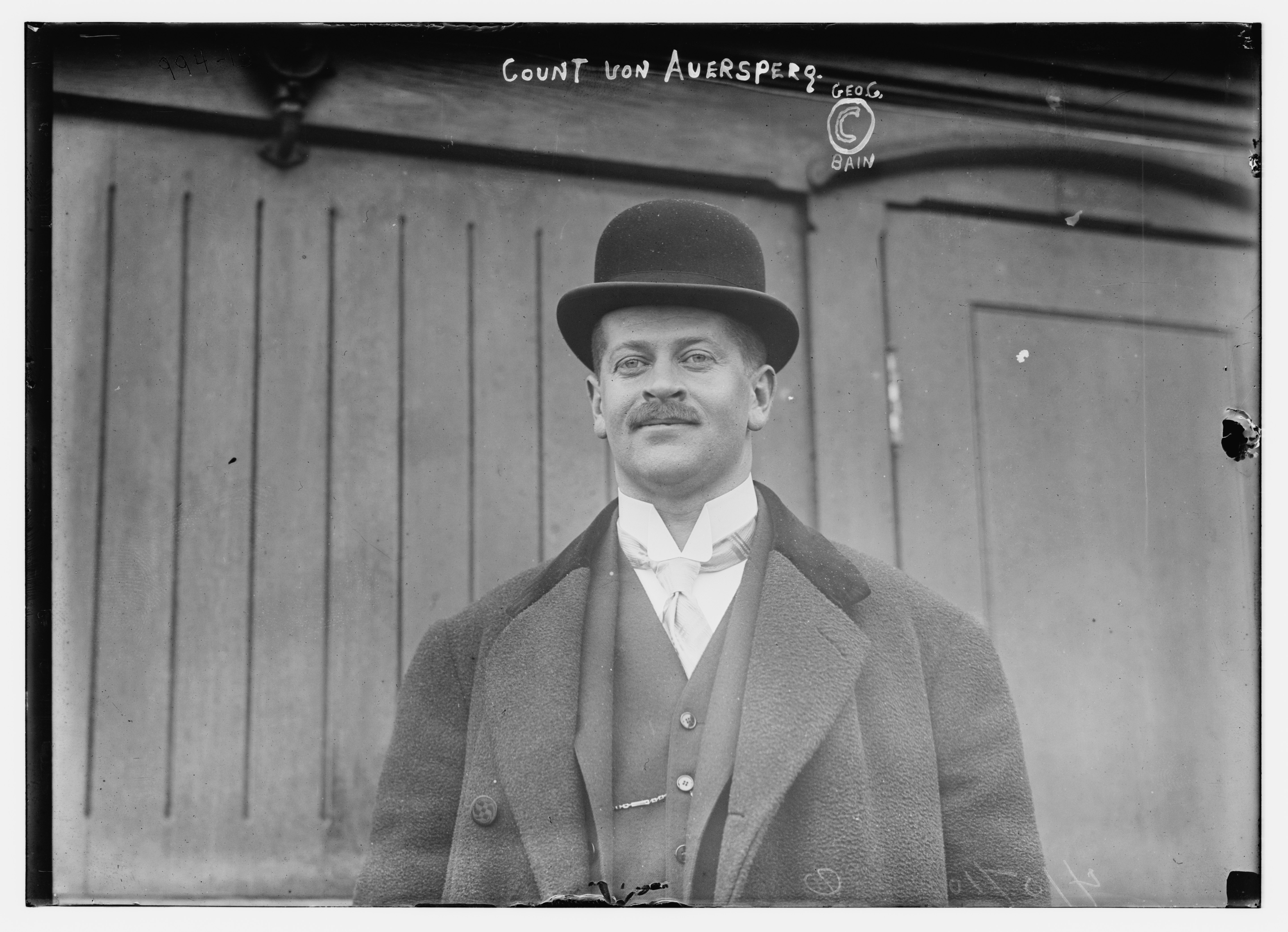
Count von Auersperg, c. 1910

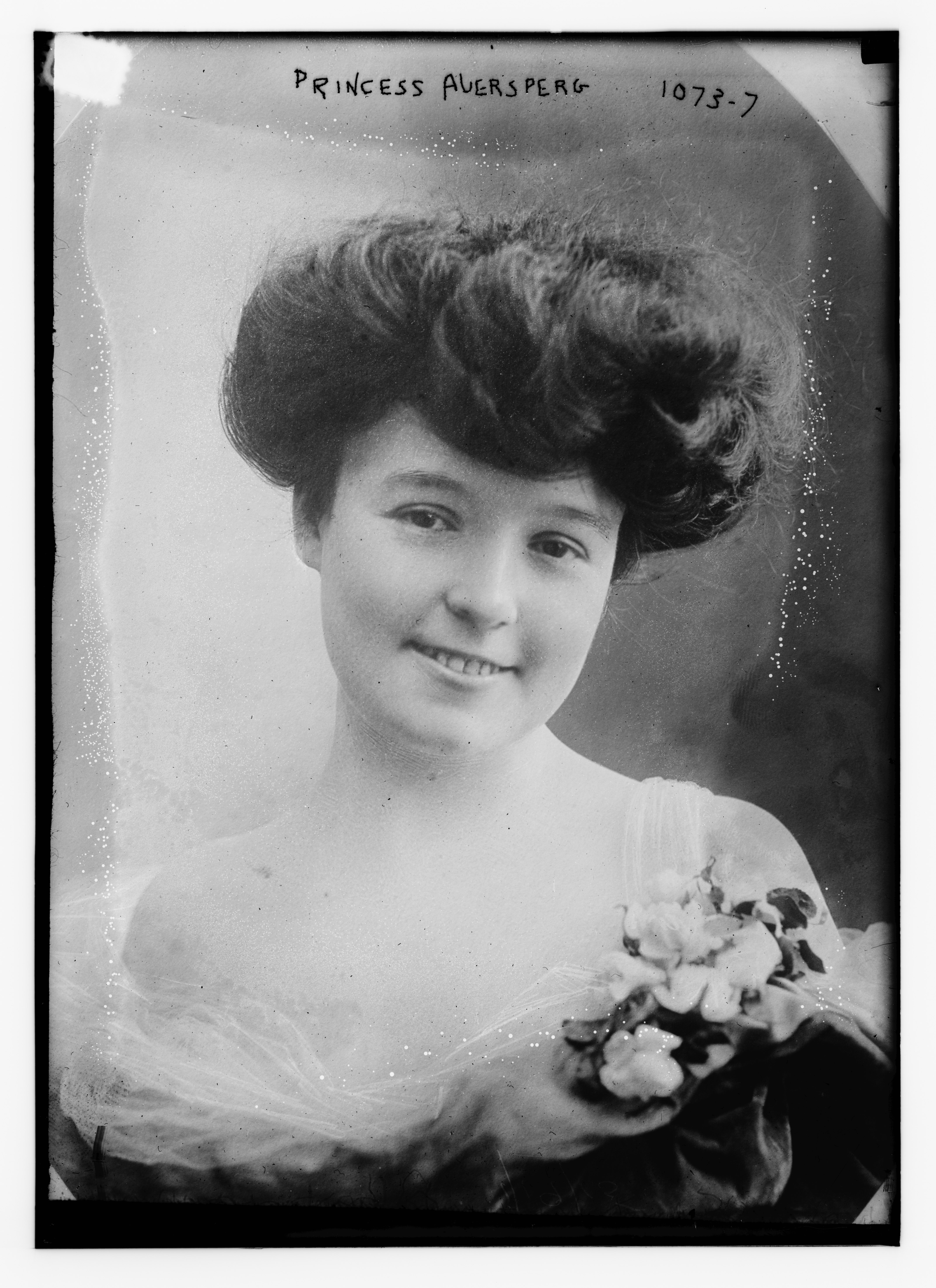
Princess Auersperg, c. 1915

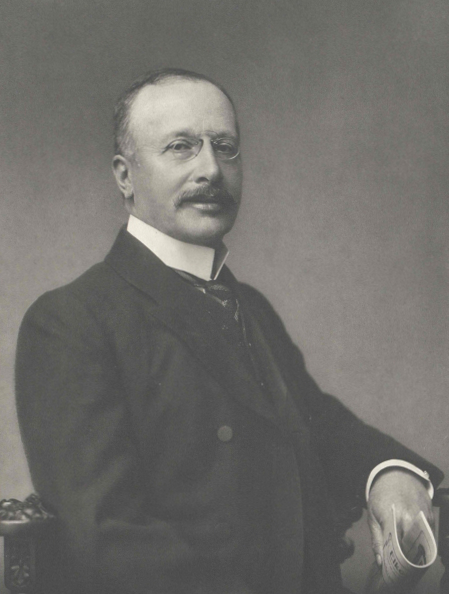
Leopold von Auersperg

== See also ==
- Austrian nobility
- Mediatised houses
- List of princes of Austria-Hungary
- List of titled noble families in the Kingdom of Hungary
