= Crete (disambiguation) =

Crete is a large island in Greece.

Crete may also refer to:

== Places ==
=== Historical ===
- Ancient Crete
- Battle of Crete
- Byzantine Crete
- Crete and Cyrenaica, Roman province
- Emirate of Crete
- Ottoman Crete
- Venetian Crete
- Cretan State

=== Places in the United States ===
- Crete, Illinois
  - Crete-Monee High School
- Crete, Indiana
- Crete, Nebraska
- Crete, an unincorporated town in Sargent County, North Dakota

=== Other places ===
- La Crete, Alberta, Canada
- Črete, a former settlement in Slovenia
- Sea of Crete

== People, figures, and, characters ==
- Crete Hutchinson (1884–1970), American writer
- Crête, a surname
- Crete (mythology), the name of several figures from Greek mythology

== Other uses ==
- Crete, a 2004 non-fiction book by Barry Unsworth
- University of Crete

== See also ==
- Cretan
- Crete Senesi, area of the Italian region of Tuscany
- Hyundai Creta, a subcompact crossover SUV named after the Crete island
