= Brezina, Brežice =

Brezina
- Location in Slovenia
- Coordinates: 45°55′34″N 15°35′42″E
- Country: Slovenia
- Traditional region: Styria
- Statistical region: Lower Sava
- Municipality: Brežice
- Elevation: 153 m (502 ft)

Brezina (pronounced [bɾɛˈziːna]; German: Bresina) is a former settlement in the Municipality of Brežice in eastern Slovenia, close to the border with Croatia. It is now part of the town of Brežice. The area is part of the traditional region of Styria. It is now included with the rest of the municipality in the Lower Sava Statistical Region.

== Geography ==
Brezina is a linear settlement along the road from Brežice to Sromlje. The soil in the area is loamy, and the agricultural land mostly consists of meadows and low-quality tilled fileds. The soil to the east is more fertile. There were claypits to the southeast, north of the train station, which were used to supply a brickworks.

== Name ==
Brezina was attested in historical sources as Graein in 1358. The name probably does not derive from the Slovene common noun breza 'birch', but instead from the old locative *brězě '(on the) bank', semantically corresponding to the 14th-century German name (cf. MHG gereine, a collective of rein 'border, edge, ditch').

== History ==
During the Second World War, the German authorities evicted 390 people from Brezina in the fall of 1941 in order to resettle Gottschee Germans in the village. In October 1941, the Partisans' Brežice Company, commanded by Dušan Kveder, was established at the signalman's cabin in the southern part of the village.

Brezina had a population of 245 living in 36 houses in 1869, and 308 living in 52 houses in 1900. Brezina was annexed by Brežice in 1981, ending its existence as an independent settlement.
