= Trnje (disambiguation) =

Trnje is a district of Zagreb, the capital of Croatia.

It may also refer to the following places:

Croatia

- Trnje, Zagreb County, a village near Velika Gorica, Croatia

Kosovo

- Trnje/Termje, a village in the municipality of Suva Reka/Suharekë, Kosovo

Slovenia

- Trnje, Brežice, a former village in the Municipality of Brežice, eastern Slovenia
- Trnje, Črenšovci, a village in the Municipality of Črenšovci, northeastern Slovenia
- Trnje, Pivka, a village in the Municipality of Pivka, southwestern Slovenia
- Trnje, Škofja Loka, a village in the Municipality of Škofja Loka, northwestern Slovenia
- Trnje, Trebnje, a village in the Municipality of Trebnje, southeastern Slovenia
