= Marjan Šetinc =

Slovenian politician

Marjan Šetinc (born 15 May 1949, Šentlenart, Slovenia) is a former member of the Parliament of Slovenia (1992–1996) and a former ambassador to Ireland and the United Kingdom from Slovenia.

== References and sources ==
- Theory and Research in Education
- Embassy of the Republic of Slovenia in London
- Listed in Debrett's People of Today, 2000 Millennium Edition
