= Zverinjak =

Zverinjak may refer to:

- Zverinjak, Slovenia, former name of Gornji Lenart, a village near Brežice
- Zverinjak, Montenegro, a village near Nikšić
