= Gornji Lenart =

Gornji Lenart Zverinjak (until 1927)
- Location in Slovenia
- Coordinates: 45°55′47.96″N 15°34′21.96″E
- Country: Slovenia
- Traditional region: Styria
- Statistical region: Lower Sava
- Municipality: Brežice

Area
  - Total: 7.26 km^{2} (2.80 sq mi)
- Elevation: 151.3 m (496 ft)

Population (2020)
  - Total: 235
  - Density: 32.4/km^{2} (83.8/sq mi)

Gornji Lenart (pronounced [ˈɡoːɾnji ˈleːnaɾt], formerly Zverinjak, German: Thiergarten) is a settlement in the Municipality of Brežice in eastern Slovenia. The area is part of the traditional region of Styria. It is now included in the Lower Sava Statistical Region.

== Name ==
The name Gornji Lenart literally means 'upper Leonard', a designation that distinguished it from Šentlenart (literally, 'Saint Leonard'), which was annexed by Brežice. Until 1927, the settlement was officially called Zverinjak (literally, 'menagerie'), in reference to the collection of wild animals kept there by the owners of Brežice Castle. Locally, the settlement is also known as Tirget (< German Tiergarten 'zoo'), also a reference to the menagerie, or Čret (literally, 'marshland, morass'), referring to the local geography.

== History ==
During the Second World War, in the fall of 1941, the village population was evicted in order to make way for the resettlement of Gottschee Germans.
