= Zakot =

- Location in Slovenia
- Coordinates: 45°54′39″N 15°36′29″E
- Country: Slovenia
- Traditional region: Styria
- Statistical region: Lower Sava
- Municipality: Brežice
- Elevation: 160 m (520 ft)

Zakot (pronounced [zaˈkoːt]; German: Sakot) is a former settlement in the Municipality of Brežice in eastern Slovenia, close to the border with Croatia. It is now part of the town of Brežice. The area is part of the traditional region of Styria. It is now included with the rest of the municipality in the Lower Sava Statistical Region.

== Geography ==
Zakot is a linear settlement north of the road from Brežice to Bizeljsko.

== History ==
During the Second World War, the German authorities evicted the population of Zakot in the fall of 1941 to resettle Gottschee Germans in the village.

Zakot had a population of 114 living in 19 houses in 1869, and 166 living in 24 houses in 1900. Zakot was annexed by Brežice in 1981, ending its existence as an independent settlement.
