= Crête Sèche =

Crête Sèche (from French: "dry crest") may refer to:

- Crête Sèche (Mont Blanc massif), a mountain in Switzerland
- Col de Crête Sèche, a mountain pass between Italy and Switzerland
- Refuge Crête Sèche, a mountain hut in Italy
