= Anton Krošl =

Slovenian writer

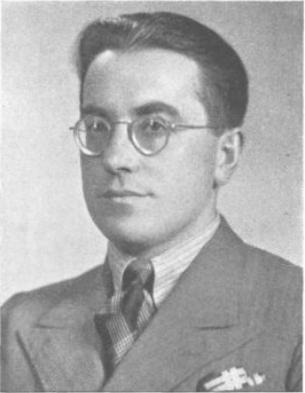
Anton Krošl (1905–1945), Slovenian politician, historian and writer

Anton Krošl (18 May 1905, in Brežice – 4 May 1945, in the concentration camp Neuengamme-Hamburg) was a Slovenian historian, educator, politician, and writer.

Krošl was educated at the Maribor Humanistic Gymnasium, where he studied at Ljubljana Philosophical Faculty and graduated in 1930. He also studied in Paris and Caen in France. He wrote poems and books, and worked as a translator and editor. Krošl was the first editor in Chief of Ogenj (Fire), the main magazine of the Krekova Mladina (Krek Youth) (1928). In 1930 he became in charge of the Christian Socialist book publisher Delavska založba (Workers publisher). He was co-author of the book Pregled občne zgodovine (Overview of general history) (1934). He also wrote a school textbook Zgodovina trgovine s kratkim orisom občne zgodovine (The history of commerce with a brief outline of general history) (1934) that was used in schools in the Kingdom of Yugoslavia. He was professor at Trgovska akademija v Ljubljani (Ljubljana Commercial Academy).

He was pioneer of Slovene distance education, as founder, owner and director of the private Dopisne trgovske šole (Correspondence trade school) and Trgovski učni zavod (Retail educational Institute in Ljubljana).

At Year 1941 he received his PhD at Philosophical Faculty in Ljubljana with the thesis Zemljiška odveza na bivšem Kranjskem : organizacija in delo zemljiškoodveznih organov 1849-1853. (Emancipation in the former Carniola: organization and work of the Emancipation authority 1849-1853).

During World War II he founded and led the secret national liberation organization Pobratim (Brotherhood) (est. 1 June 1941). He was also founder and leader of the secret wartime organization Narodna legija (National legion) ( est. 1943).

The organizations Pobratim and Narodna legija belonged to the Slovenian wartime political center and their approach was monarchist, legalistic based on apolitical platform. They worked against the Italian and German occupying forces. Pobratim and Narodna legija supported the Royal Yugoslav Government in exile and the Western allies with participation in the field of secret intelligence work. Krošl was also chief of the main organizing committee of the Headquarters of the Command of Slovenia-Royal Yugoslav Army in Slovenia. He was the highest-ranking civilian in the Royal Yugoslav Army in Slovenia. The Command of Slovenia was established in February 1942. In August 1942 he was arrested by Italian occupying forces and released in 1943. (AS 1931) He also participated in the organization Direktorij (Directory), established in 1943, which aimed to organize a secret military grouping willing to take political and military leadership in Slovenia and they appointed Krošl as commander.

He was also founder and leader of the secret wartime organization Narodna edinost (National unity) that also published the wartime newspaper Narodna edinost (National Unity) In 1943 and 1944 he was Head of State Intelligence Service of the Royal Yugoslav Army in Slovenia.

During arrests in the Bata palace in Ljubljana in 1944 he was arrested by the German occupation forces (Gestapo) and sent to a concentration camp Dachau and from there to a concentration camp at Neuengamme near Hamburg in Germany. The Germans evacuated the camp in 1945; he was among the 5,000 evacuees killed in the sinking of the Ancona by the RAF the day before the war ended.
