= Trnje, Brežice =

Trnje
- Location in Slovenia
- Coordinates: 45°54′16″N 15°36′31″E
- Country: Slovenia
- Traditional region: Styria
- Statistical region: Lower Sava
- Municipality: Brežice
- Elevation: 150 m (490 ft)

Trnje (pronounced [ˈtəɾnjɛ]; German: Ternje) is a former settlement in the Municipality of Brežice in eastern Slovenia, close to the border with Croatia. It is now part of the town of Brežice. The area is part of the traditional region of Styria. It is now included with the rest of the municipality in the Lower Sava Statistical Region.

== Geography ==
Trnje is a settlement between the roads from Brežice to Bizeljsko and Dobova. It borders Brežice to the west, to the east it is bordered by Gabrnica Creek, and to the south it extends to the Sava River. The soil is gravelly, and there are fertile fields south of the village, which are subject to flooding when the Sava rises.

== Name ==
Like similar toponyms in Slovenia (e.g., Trnava, Trnovec, and Trnovo), the name Trnje is derived from the common noun trn 'thorn', referring to the local vegetation.

== History ==
In the first half of the 18th century, the owners of Brežice Castle set up a dairy in Trnje for cheese production. In the 20th century, a statue of Saint Wendelin, the patron saint of herdsmen, still stood at the site.

The village is the gravesite of 3,500 Prussian prisoners of war, part of the army commanded by General Friedrich August von Finck. The soldiers died in 1759 due to disease caused by the warm, wet climate.

During the Second World War, the German authorities evicted the population of Trnje in the fall of 1941 to resettle Gottschee Germans in the village.

Trnje had a population of 71 living in 13 houses in 1869, and 90 living in 17 houses in 1900. Trnje was annexed by Brežice in 1981, ending its existence as an independent settlement.
