= Brežice railway station =

Railway station in Brežice, Slovenia

Brežice
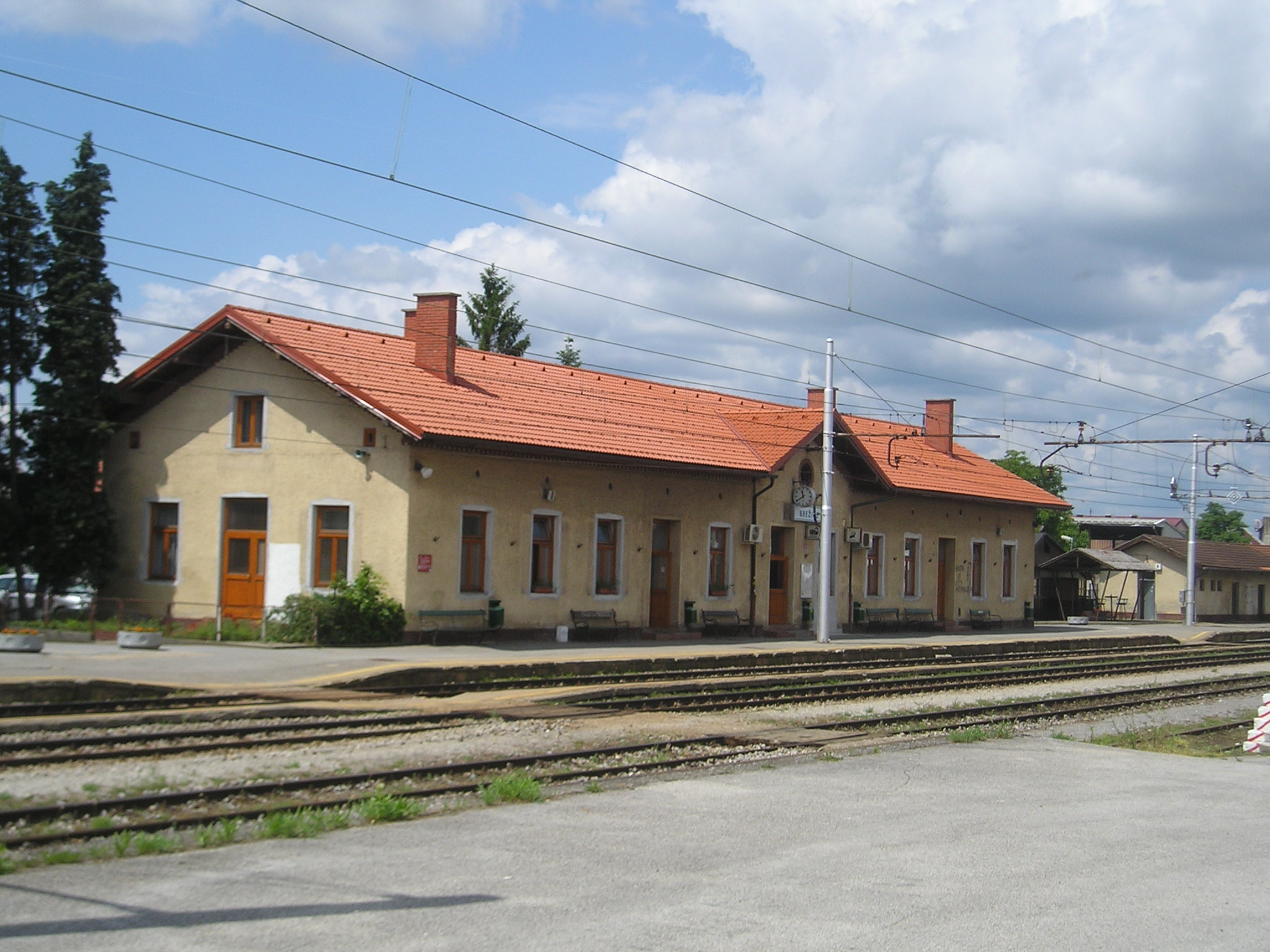

General information
- Location: 8250 Brežice; Slovenia
- Coordinates: 45°55′26″N 15°35′24″E
- Owner: Slovenian Railways
- Operator: Slovenian Railways
Location
- Location within Slovenia

Brežice railway station (Slovene: Železniška postaja Brežice) is the principal railway station serving Brežice, Slovenia.

== History ==
On the night of 8/9 June 1944, the station was attacked by a lone Bristol Beaufighter Mk.VI of No.255 Squadron RAF, flying an Intruder Patrol from its base at Foggia, Italy. The crew claimed "Two ammunition trains destroyed, one locomotive damaged and a tented camp at least frightened."
