= Sromlje =

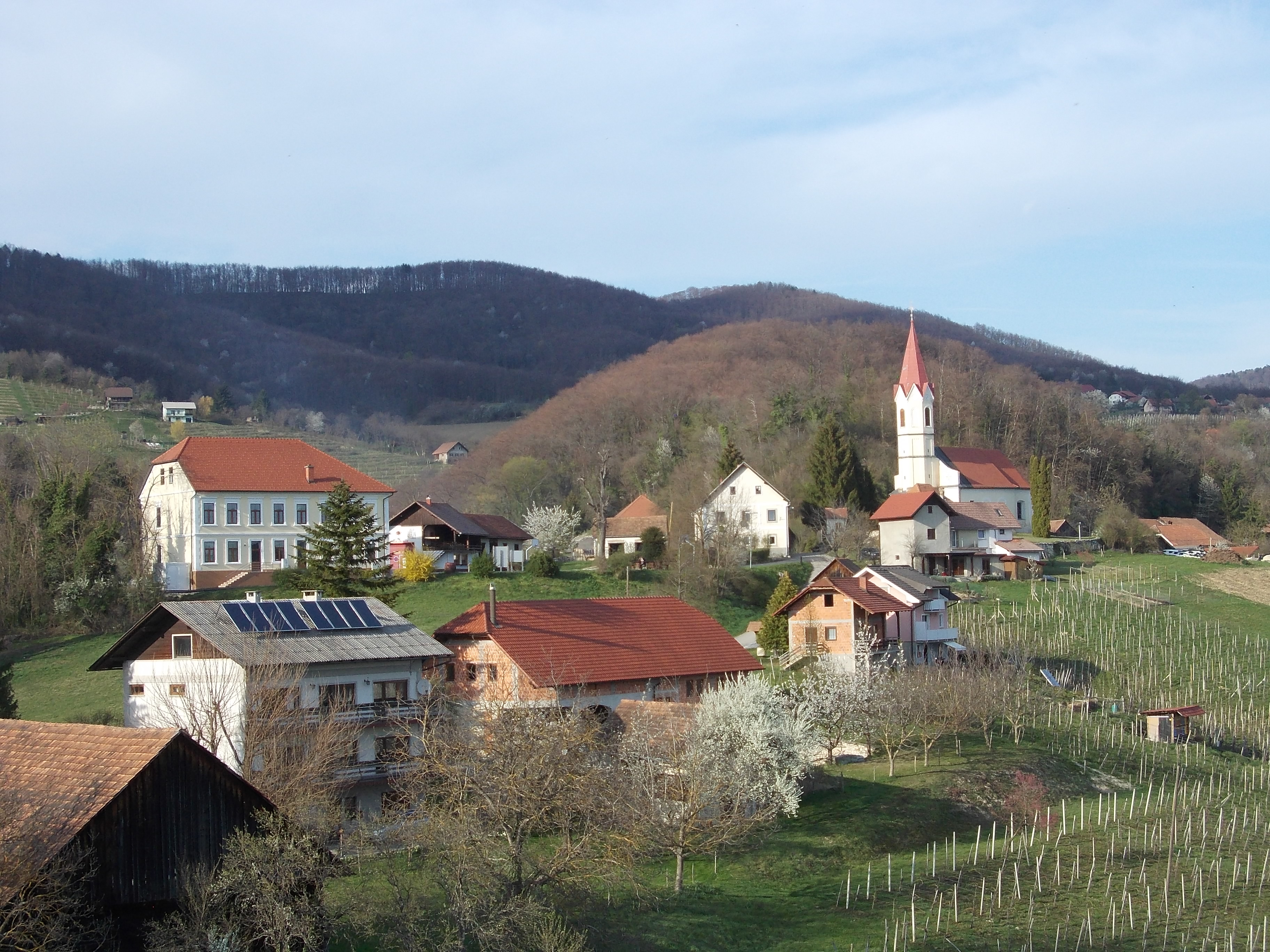

- Location in Slovenia
- Coordinates: 45°59′21.65″N 15°35′44.56″E
- Country: Slovenia
- Traditional region: Styria
- Statistical region: Lower Sava
- Municipality: Brežice

Area
  - Total: 2.5 km^{2} (0.97 sq mi)
- Elevation: 262.1 m (860 ft)

Population (2020)
  - Total: 129
  - Density: 52/km^{2} (130/sq mi)

Sromlje (pronounced [ˈsɾoːmljɛ], German: Sromle) is a village in the hills north of Brežice in the Municipality of Brežice in eastern Slovenia. The area is part of the traditional region of Styria. It is now included with the rest of the municipality in the Lower Sava Statistical Region.

== Name ==
Sromlje was attested in historical sources as Zwaromes in 1268, Swaroͤmel in 1309, and Zwaroml in 1322, among other spellings. The name is derived from the Slavic nickname *Svaromъ via the plural demonym *Svaromľane, therefore originally meaning 'inhabitants of Svaromъ's village', referring to an early resident of the place.

== Church ==
The parish church in the settlement is dedicated to Saint Martin and belongs to the Roman Catholic Diocese of Celje. It is an originally medieval building that was rebuilt in the Baroque style in the second half of the 18th century. Its exterior was extensively altered in the 19th century. A second church in the settlement is dedicated to Saint John of Nepomuk and was built in the 16th century.
