= Crête =

Crête is a surname of French origin. Some persons with the surname include:

- Joseph-Alphida Crête (1890–1964), Canadian politician
- Martin Crête (born 1985), Canadian curler
- Paul Crête (born 1953), Canadian politician
- Stéphane Crête (born 1967), Canadian actor and comedian

== See also ==
- Crête Sèche (disambiguation)
