= Brežice Water Tower =

Water tower in Brežice, Slovenia

Coordinates: 45°54′13.99″N 15°35′36.98″E

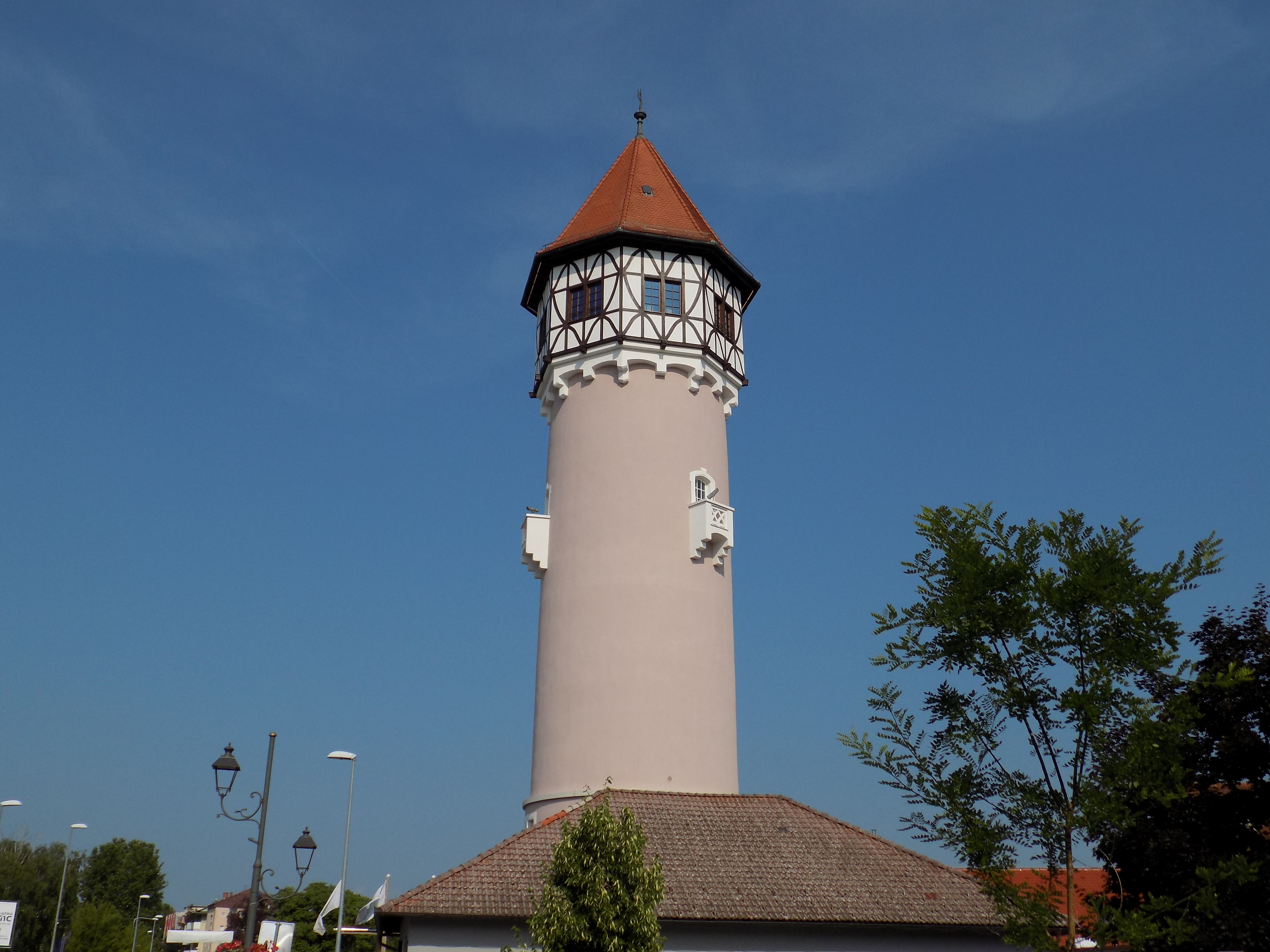
Water Tower in Brežice

The Brežice Water Tower was built in 1914, together with a city sewage system and electrification. It used to serve as the water supply for Brežice until the new water house was built below Šentvid Hill above the town. It is 46 meters (151 ft) high and it is one of the most prominent buildings in town. Today the water tower houses a pub.

== See also ==
- Water Tower
