= Črnc =

- Location in Slovenia
- Coordinates: 45°54′54″N 15°36′08″E
- Country: Slovenia
- Traditional region: Styria
- Statistical region: Lower Sava
- Municipality: Brežice
- Elevation: 153 m (502 ft)

Črnc (pronounced [ˈtʃəɾnts]; in older sources Černc, German: Tschernz) is a former settlement in the Municipality of Brežice in eastern Slovenia, close to the border with Croatia. It is now part of the town of Brežice. The area is part of the traditional region of Styria. It is now included with the rest of the municipality in the Lower Sava Statistical Region.

== Geography ==
Črnc is a scattered settlement extending north to the Dobova–Ljubljana Railway. It is located in the fertile Črnc Plain (Slovene: Črnsko polje).

== Name ==
Like similar toponyms in Slovenia (e.g., Črnci, Črnec, and Črnova), the name Črnc is derived from the adjective črn 'black'.

== History ==
During the Second World War, the German authorities evicted the population of Črnc in the fall of 1941 to resettle Gottschee Germans in the village.

Črnc had a population of 126 living in 18 houses in 1869, and 139 living in 24 houses in 1900. Črnc was annexed by Brežice in 1981, ending its existence as an independent settlement.

== Cultural heritage ==
In the eastern part of the village, there was a cemetery that was abandoned in 1903. It was the resting place of 17 soldiers that fell in the First World War and also the poet, writer, and politician Radoslav Razlag (1826–1880). The cemetery chapel was built in 1835 and destroyed in an earthquake in 1917, after which it was demolished, leaving only two large concrete slabs at the site.
