= Črete =

Črete Čretež pri Ledini [sic] (1953–1955)
- Location in Slovenia
- Coordinates: 46°02′45″N 15°16′29″E
- Country: Slovenia
- Traditional region: Styria
- Statistical region: Lower Sava
- Municipality: Sevnica
- Elevation: 365 m (1,198 ft)

Črete (pronounced [ˈtʃɾeːtɛ]; sometimes cited as Čretež pri Ledini, German: Tschrette or Tschrete) is a former settlement in the Municipality of Sevnica in central Slovenia. It is now part of the village of Ledina. The area is part of the traditional region of Styria. The municipality is now included in the Lower Sava Statistical Region.

== Geography ==
Črete is located about 1.6 kilometers (0.99 mi) northwest of Ledina on a slope above the left bank of the Sava River.

== Name ==
Like the related names Čreta and Čret, the name Črete is derived from the common noun čreta or čret 'marshland, morass', referring to the local geography. A 1953 decision appears to have renamed the village Čretež pri Ledini [sic], confusing the name Črete with that of settlements named Čretež.

== History ==
Črete was deemed annexed by Ledina in 1955, ending any existence it had as an independent settlement.
