= Anton Gvajc =

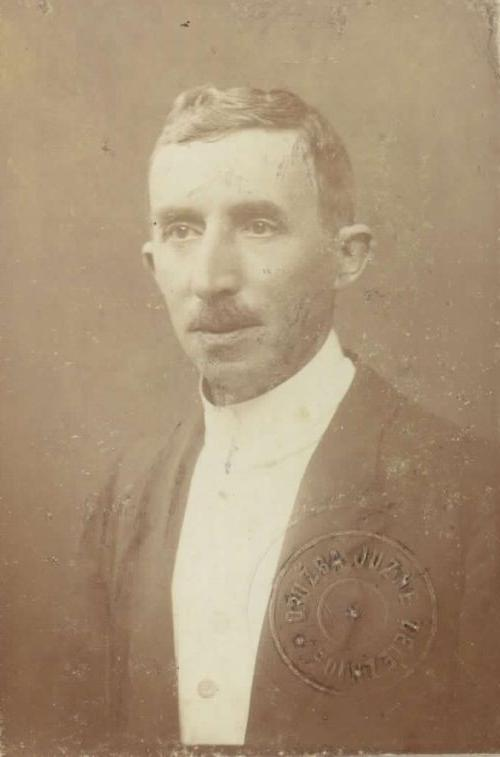
- Born: August 21, 1865; Ljubljana, Austrian Empire
- Died: August 3, 1935 (aged 69); Brežice, Yugoslavia
- Known for: painting

Anton Gvajc ( 21 August 1865 - August 3 1935) was a Slovene painter. The majority of his work is genre and landscape painting. He also worked as a teacher in Gorica, Trieste and Maribor.

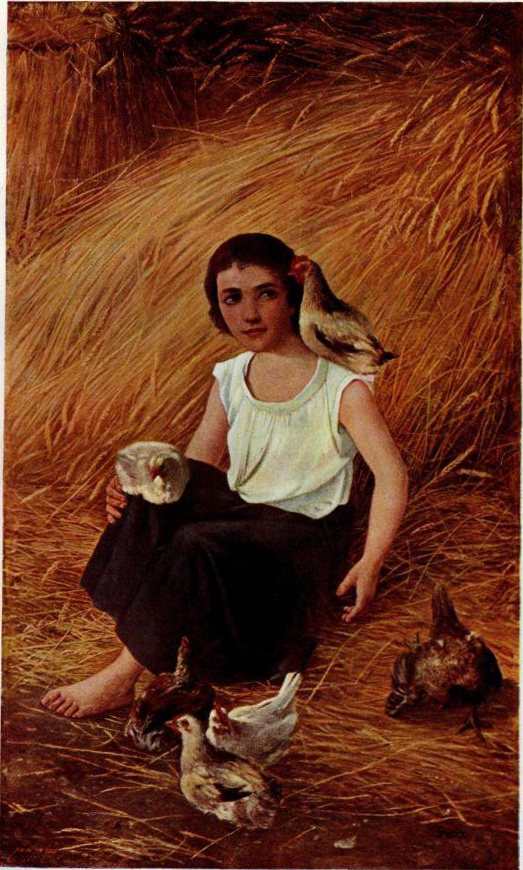
Anton Gvajc - My dear chicken (approx. 1903)
