= Crête Sèche (Mont Blanc massif) =

Mountain in Switzerland

- Location within Switzerland

Highest point
- Elevation: 3,024 m (9,921 ft)
- Prominence: 102 m (335 ft)
- Coordinates: 45°57′35″N 7°04′37″E

Geography
- Location: Valais, Switzerland
- Parent range: Mont Blanc massif

The Crête Sèche is a mountain of the Mont Blanc massif, located south-west of Praz-de-Fort in the canton of Valais. It lies on the range east of the Grand Darray.
