= Brežice Castle =

Castle in Slovenia

Coordinates: 45°54′6.15″N 15°35′32.6″E

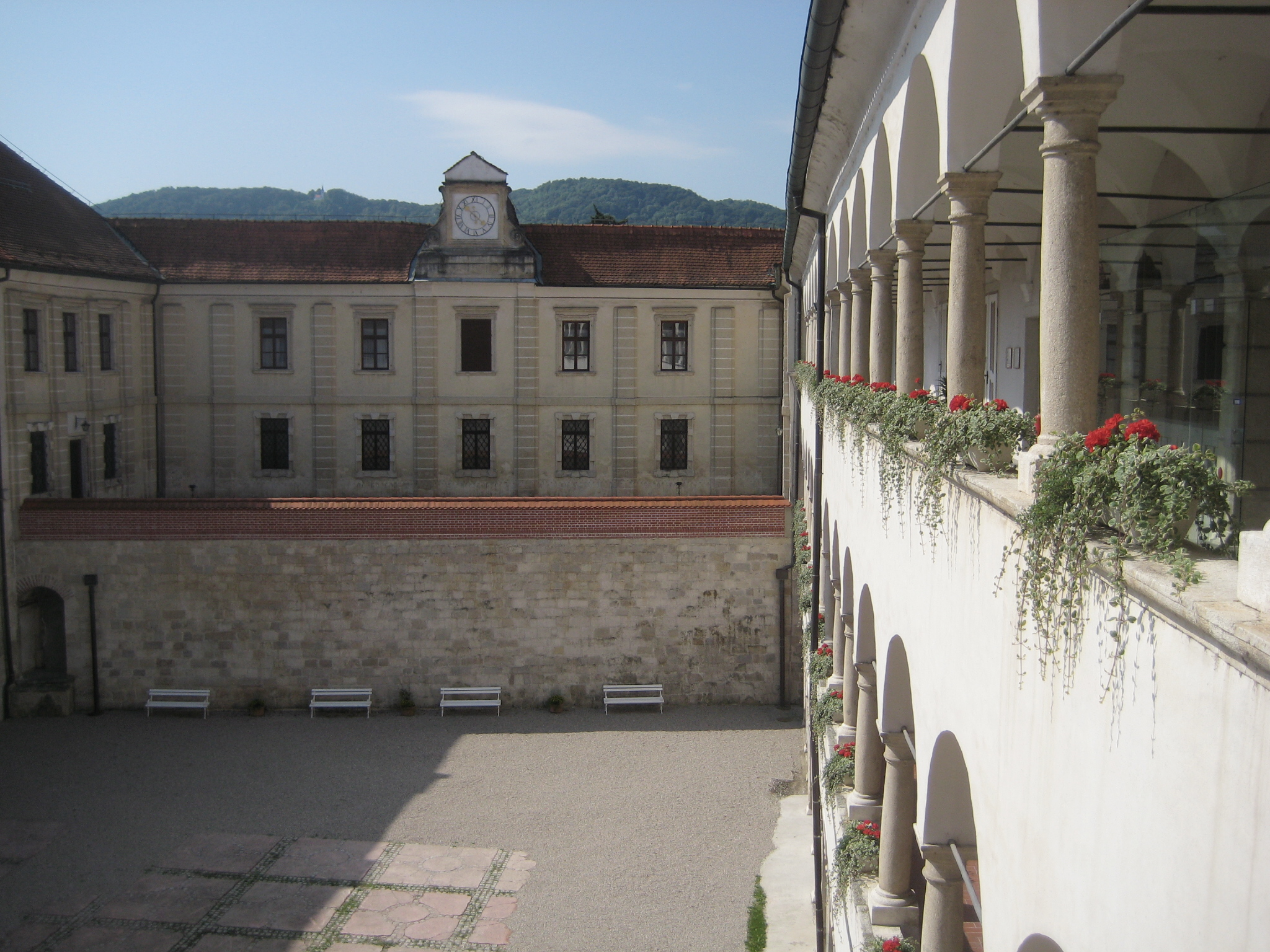
Brežice Castle, inner courtyard

Brežice Castle (Slovene: Grad Brežice, German: Schloss Rann) is a 16th-century castle in the town of Brežice, in southeastern Slovenia, at the street address Cesta prvih borcev 1.

As with the town, the castle's name derives from the diminutive plural of the Slovene word breg, 'riverbank', in reference to the nearby Sava and Krka rivers.

== History ==
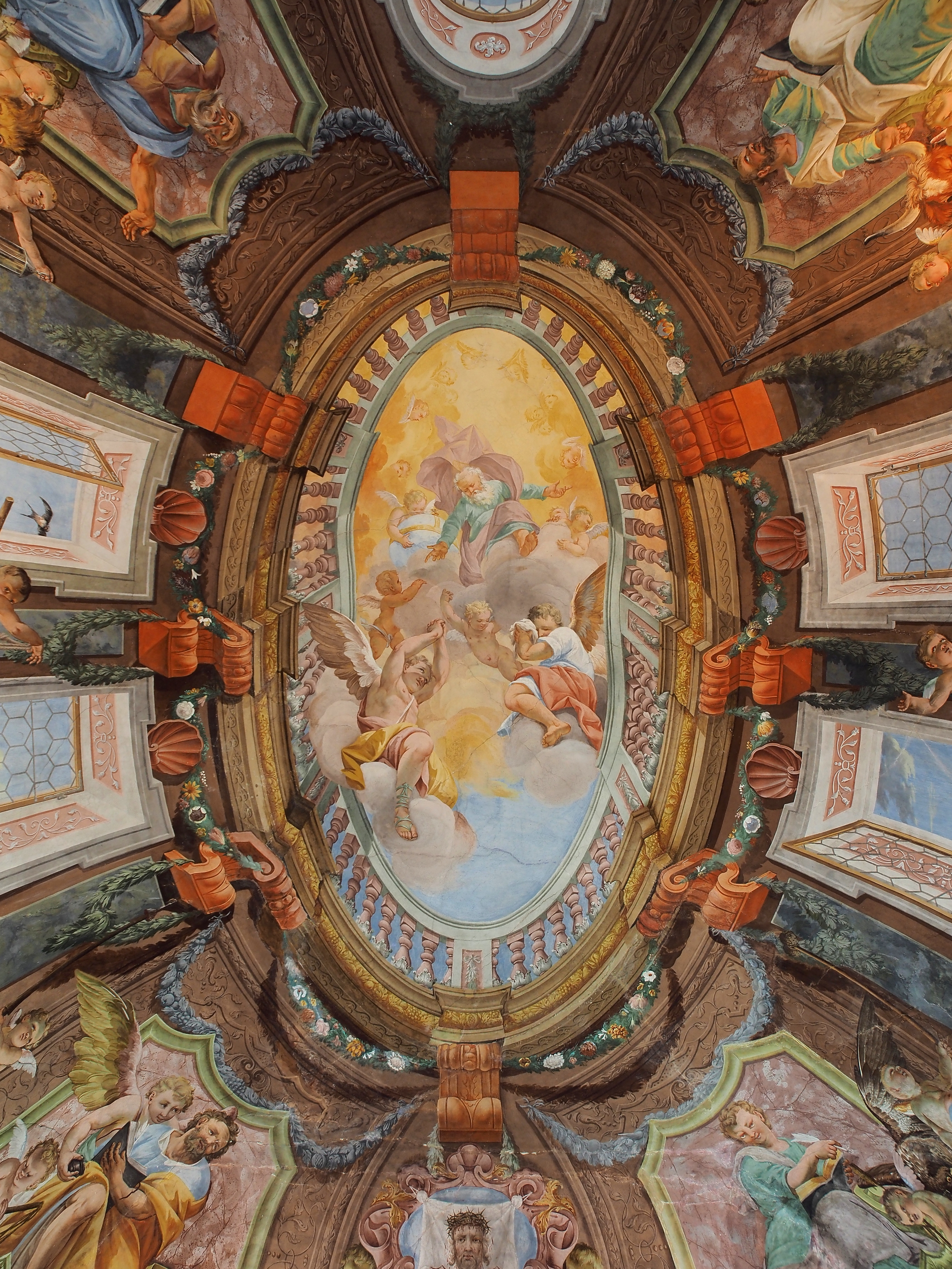
Ceiling frescoes of Chapel.

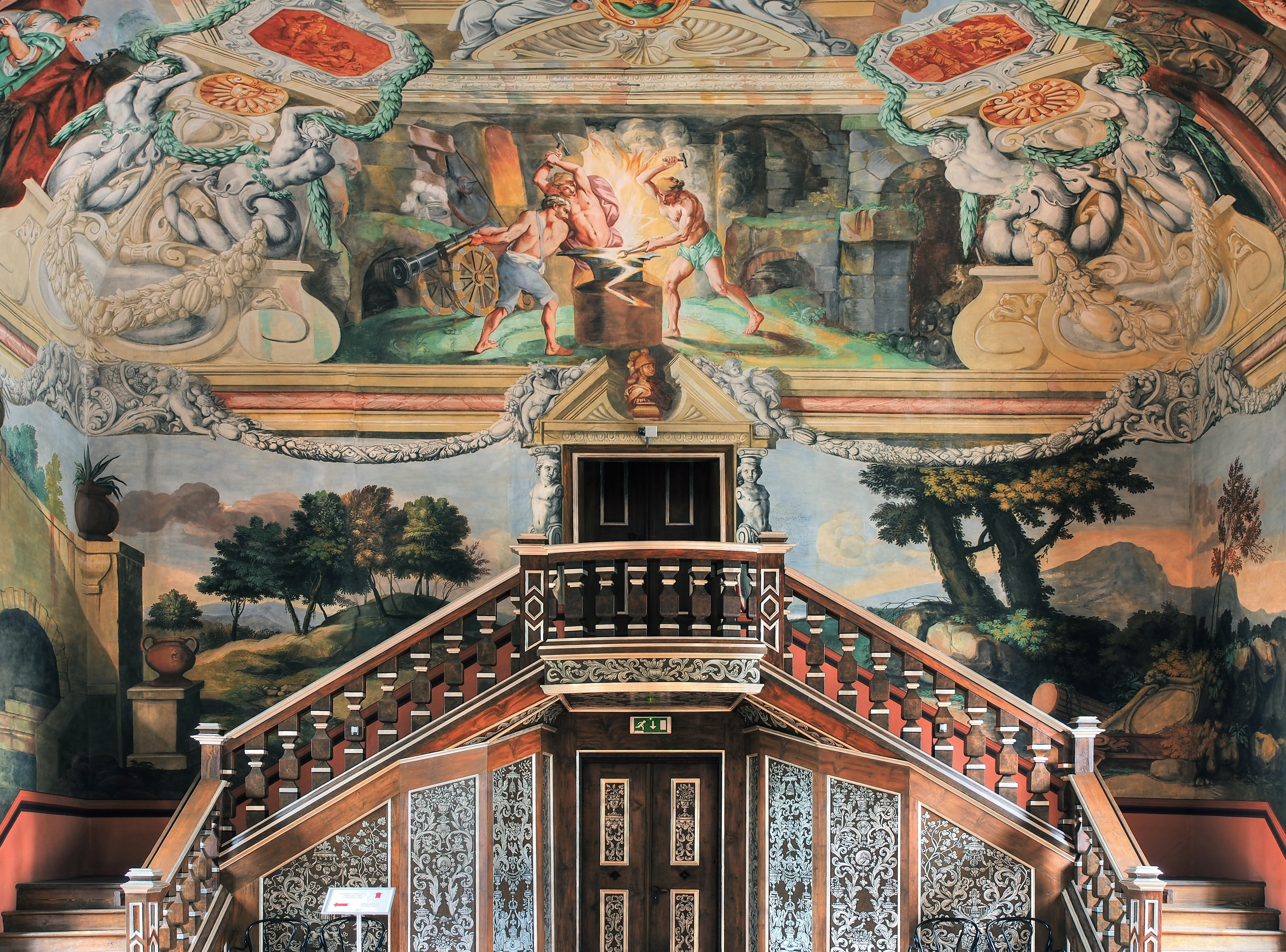
North wall of Knights Hall.

A wooden fortification was present at the site long before 1241, when Brežice (then known as Gradišče) was first mentioned. A castrum was first recorded in 1249; the predecessor of the current castle, it was probably built during the late 12th century, when Brežice became the administrative and economic center of the Bishopric of Salzburg's holdings in the Lower Sava Valley. In addition to a garrison, the castle hosted a mint and judicial chambers. The castle was then known by the German name Rain, as was the surrounding settlement (also meaning 'riverbanks').

In 1479, the Brežice area was caught up in a war between the Emperor Frederick III of Habsburg and Hungarian King Matthias Corvinus; the king's forces took the castle from the Bishopric of Salzburg and occupied it until a peace treaty was signed in 1491, at which point it was transferred to the Habsburgs.

During the great peasant revolt of 1515, local Carniolan nobility appealed for help to the ban of Croatia, who dispatched a force under the knight Marko of Klisa. En route, the knight captured some 500 wives and children of the rebellious peasants and sold them into slavery in the Croatian Littoral. A force of 900 peasants subsequently gathered at Brežice, awaiting Sir Marko, who burned down the town before retreating into the castle, which the enraged rebels then stormed, killing him and his retainers before burning it.

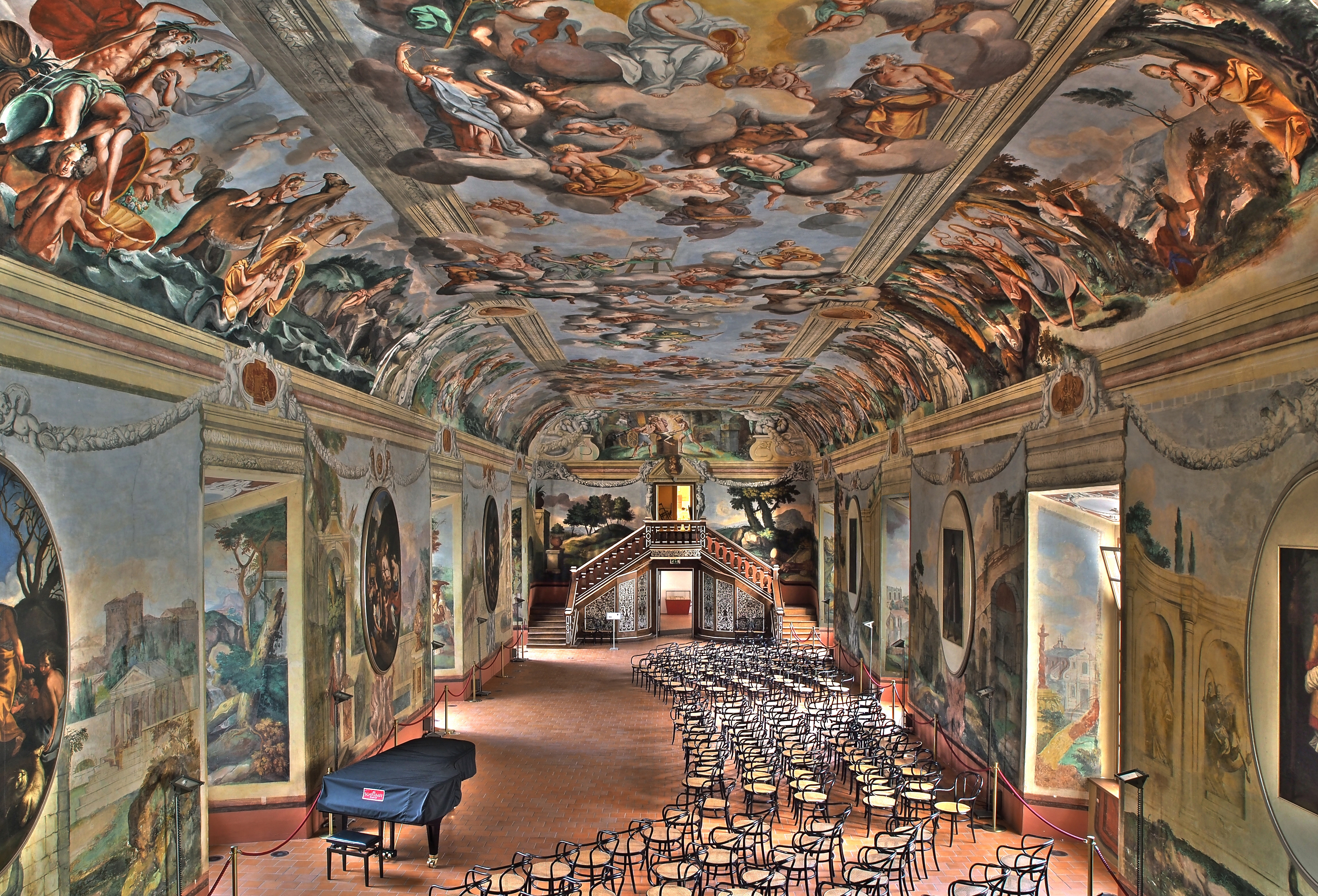
Hall of Knights.

The castle was under repair until 1528, when it again burned down. Due to the intensification of Turkish raids, the Habsburgs now began a rapid building program, intended to fortify the Border March. On 22 January 1529, emperor Ferdinand I approved an outlay of 3,000 florins for the construction of a new castle and the fortification of the town. Between 1530 and 1551, Italian master builders demolished the ruins of the old castle and erected the principal elements of the current structure, four defensive towers connected by double defensive walls. The architects included Julio Dispatio of Meran. In 1554/5 the prominent renaissance builders and brothers Andrea and Domenico del'Allio worked on the castle. An armorial stele built into the facade states that the work was finally completed by the tenure of the noble Franc Gall von Gallenstein in 1590.

In addition to surviving Turkish raids, the castle was the only fortress in the Lower Sava Valley to withstand another peasants' revolt in 1573, led by Ilija Gregorič. The corners towers were defended by three cannons each, preventing close action.

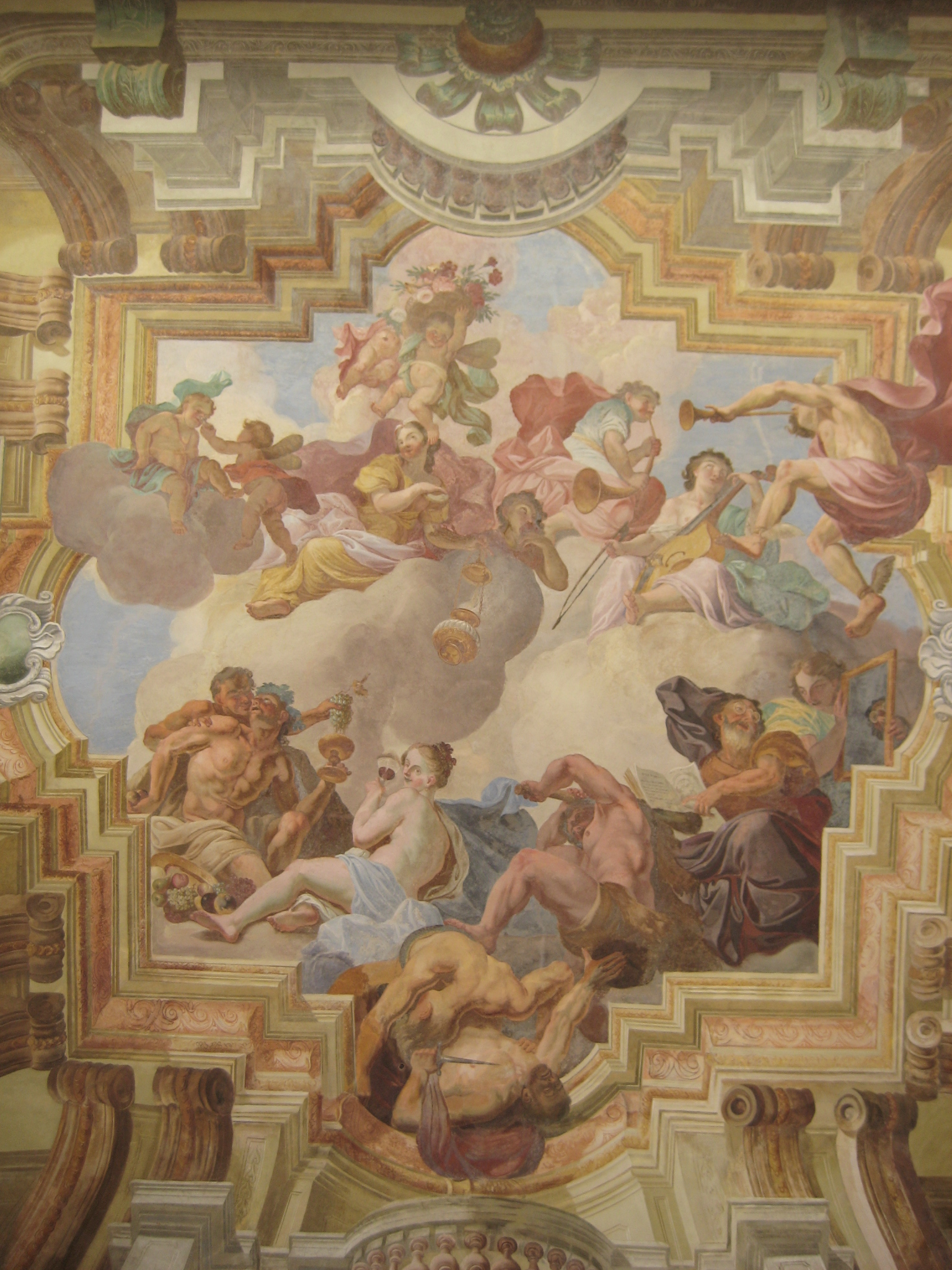
Ceiling fresco, the great hall

In the mid-17th century, the castle passed from the hands of the Gallensteins to the Croatian noble house of Frankopan. After the death of Julianna of Frankopan in 1694, her heirs sold it to count Ignatz Maria Attems, who furnished the castle with its current interior decorations, including extensive trompe-l'œil frescoes. Images on the walls of the great hall trace the progression of architecture from antiquity through the renaissance, and the ceiling bears scenes from Greek and Roman mythology.

In addition to filling in the moats, a terrace was built up beneath the south wing, making room for orchards and gardens. Around 1720 the west wing was remodeled, and a great staircase and chapel built, the walls of each being decorated by Styrian painter Franc Ignac Flurer between 1715 and 1732. The Attems had the castle re-roofed in the second half of the 18th century; the towers were given mansard roofs at the same time.

The castle was significantly damaged by an earthquake that struck the town of Brežice on January 29, 1917, during World War I, at which time the great hall served as a military hospital. The Counts Attems retained the estate until its nationalization in 1945, for a total tenure of 251 years.

== Current ==
Immediately after the war, the castle was divided into apartments for 26 families. In 1949, the castle became the home of the Lower Sava Valley Museum. The museum's holdings began with its first director, Franjo Stiplovšek, who brought them from Krško (the Aumann collection); they were later expanded and divided into archeological, ethnological, and historical exhibitions (the last focusing on the peasant revolt). There is also a gallery focusing on foreign and domestic oil paintings.

The castle is a frequent venue for cultural events, including concerts of the Brežice Festival. The great hall is also a popular location for marriages. The castle's basement has been occupied by a wine cellar, the Castle Cellar (Slovene: Grajska Klet), since 1946.

Less widely known is the use of the castle, especially the picturesque Knights Hall, as a location for filming a number of foreign films in the period just before the breakup of Yugoslavia. The best known among these are Jackie Chan's Armour of God (1986), followed by The Dirty Dozen: The Deadly Mission in 1987 and Rosencrantz and Guildenstern are Dead (1990).

It is located at the south end of the town's main street. Hours are 8-14:30 weekdays, 10-14:00 Sundays and holidays.

== Architecture ==
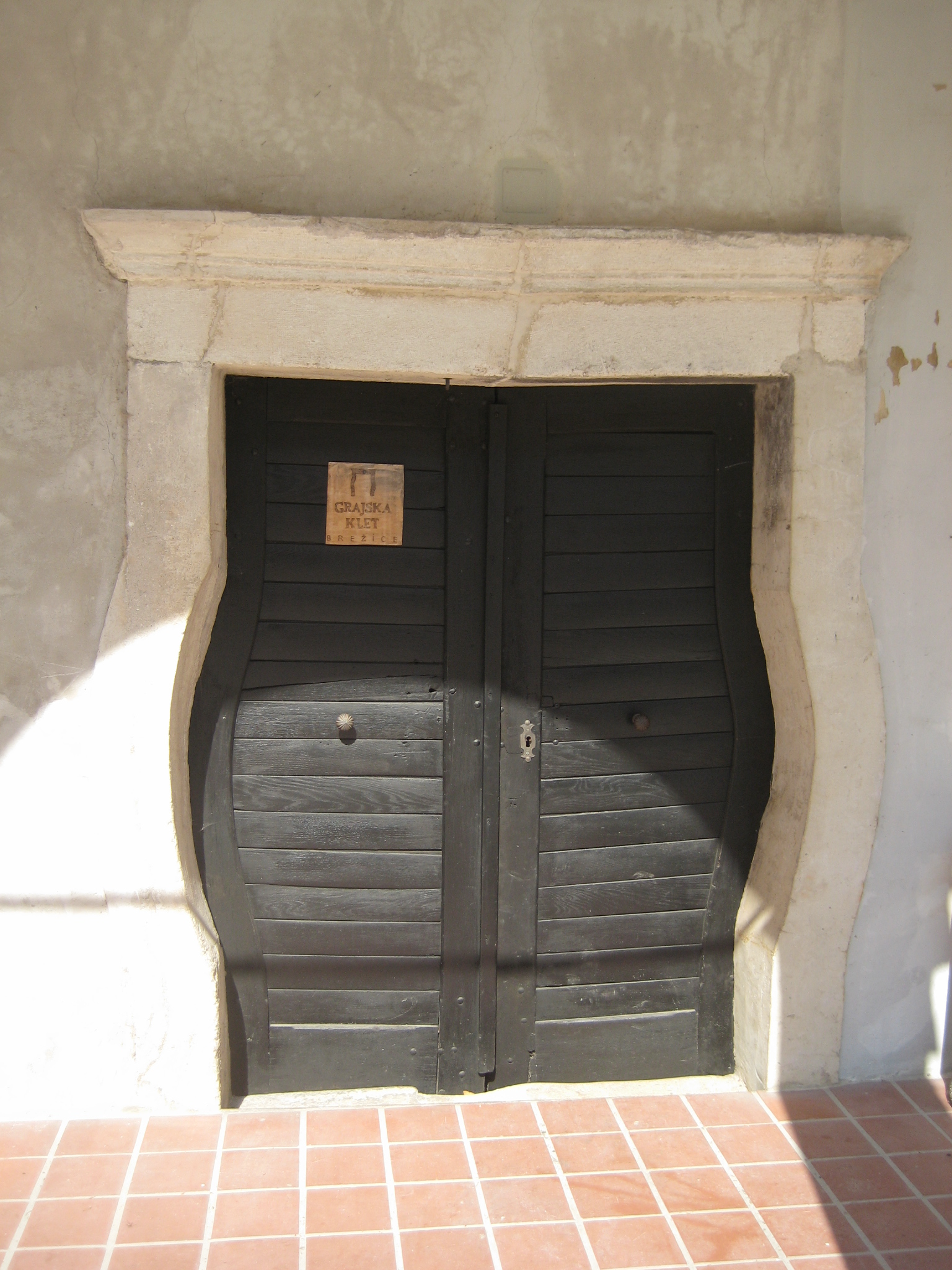
"Bowed" doorway

The castle is an excellent example of a renaissance flatland fortification, and retains its trapezoidal 16th-century layout. Records suggest construction took place in three phases: between 1530 and 1550, the basic fortress took shape, with four corner towers connected by walls; between 1567 and 1579, when the east and west tracts were added; and finally, between 1586 and 1590 or 1601, the northern tract and arcaded inner passageways.

The structure has two stories, as well as a basement carved out of bedrock. The castle once also possessed a moat and drawbridge, but although the drawbridge chains remain, both were removed after the course of the Sava River (which had filled the moat) moved away over the centuries.

The characteristic bowed gateway is the symbol of the castle's wine cellar.

== Gallery ==
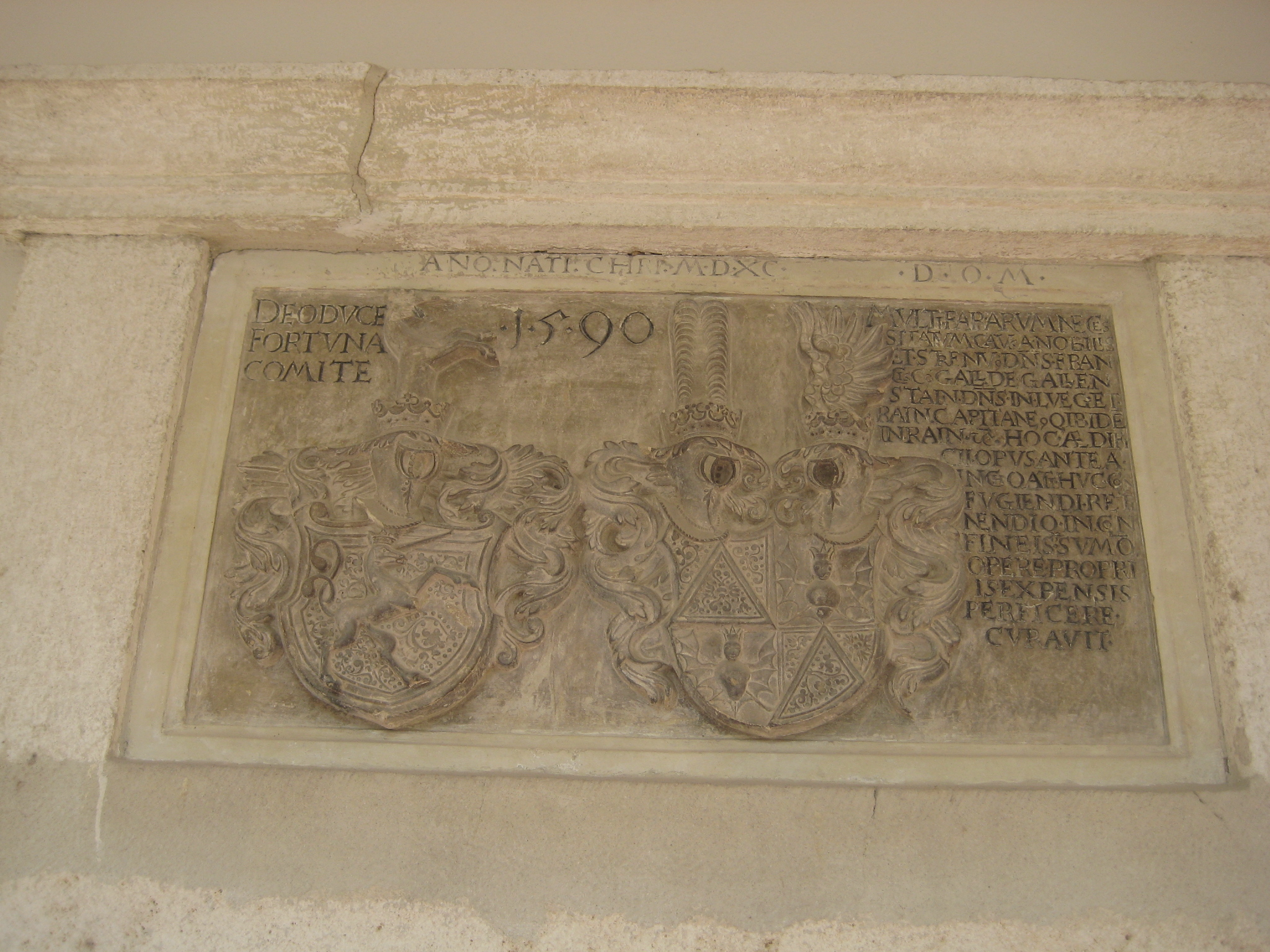
Armorial stele

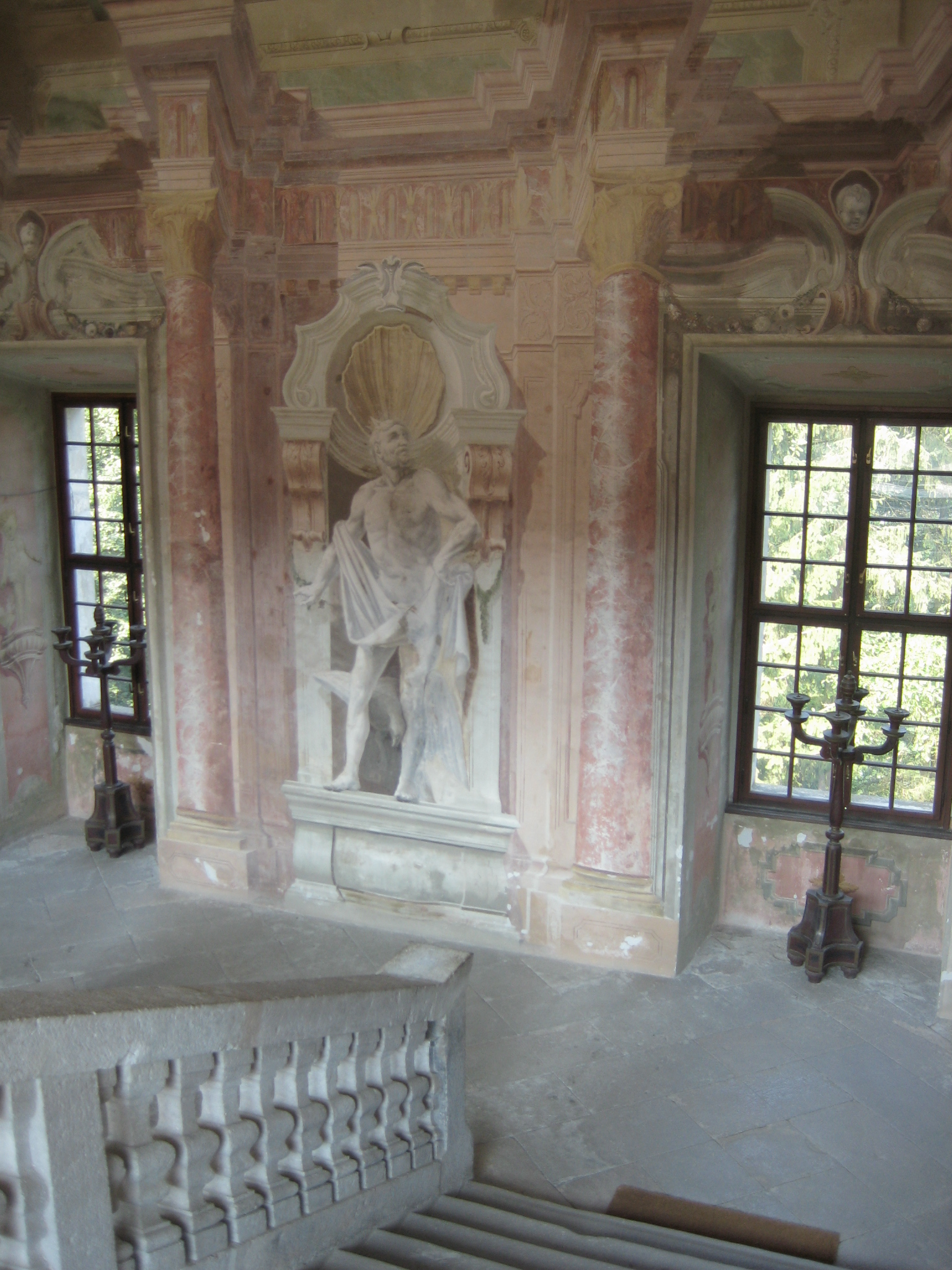
Trompe-l'œil fresco facing the staircase

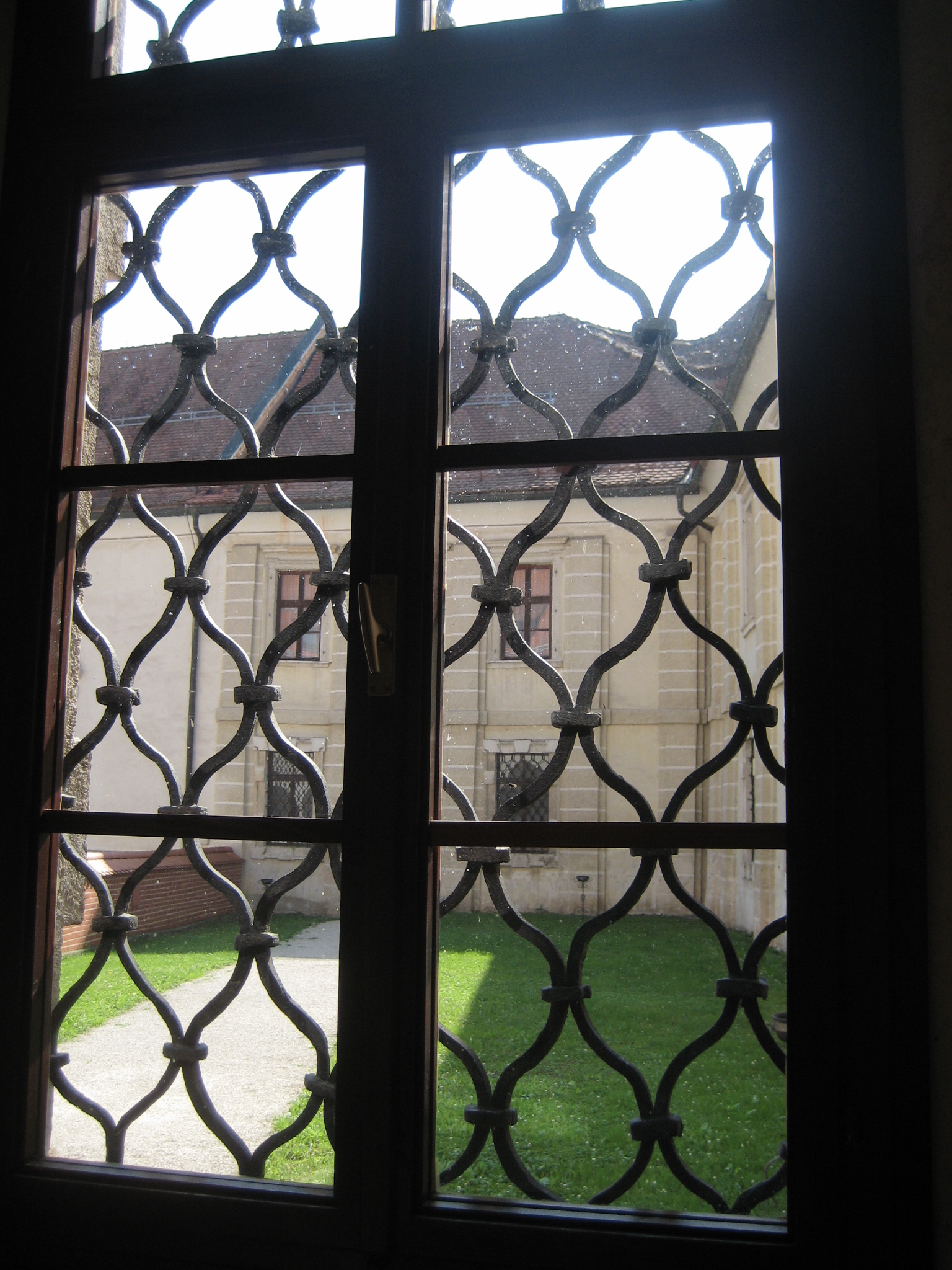
Window

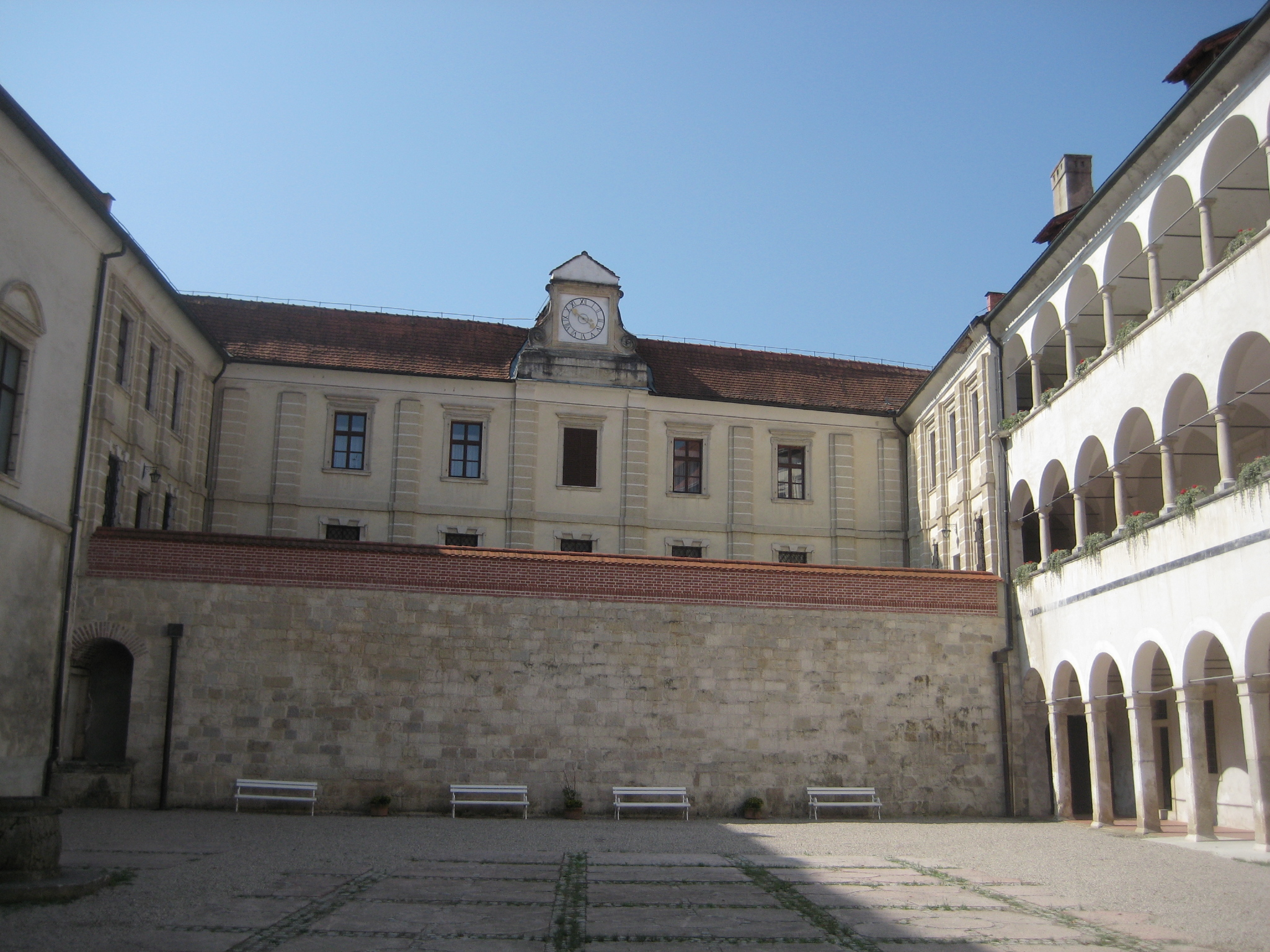
Inner courtyard

== Sources ==
- Lower Sava Valley Museum website (in Slovene)
- castle floor plan - Lower Sava Valley Museum website (in Slovene)
- visitbrezice.com aerial photos of the castle (in Croatian)
