= Brežice =

- Town
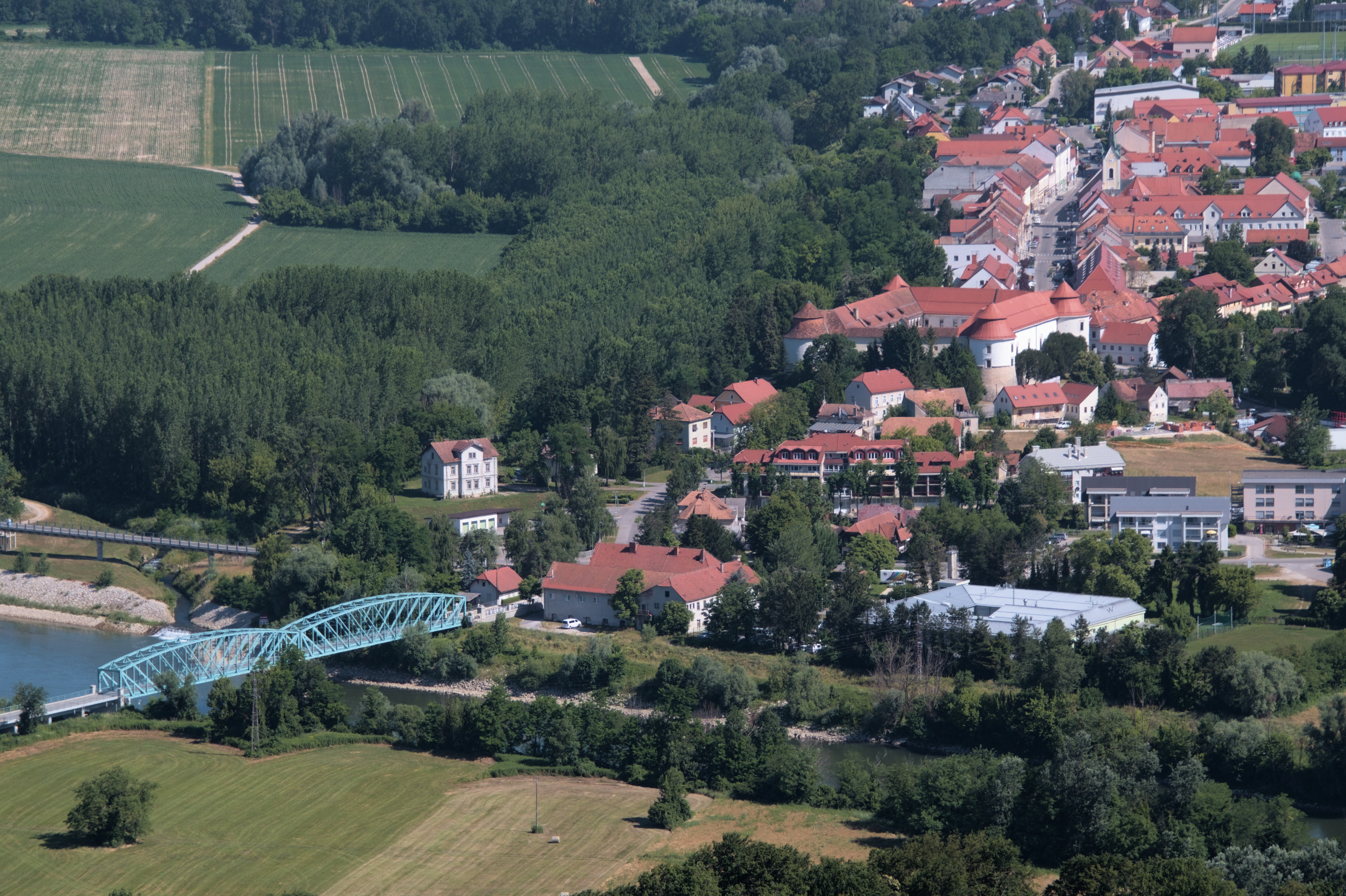
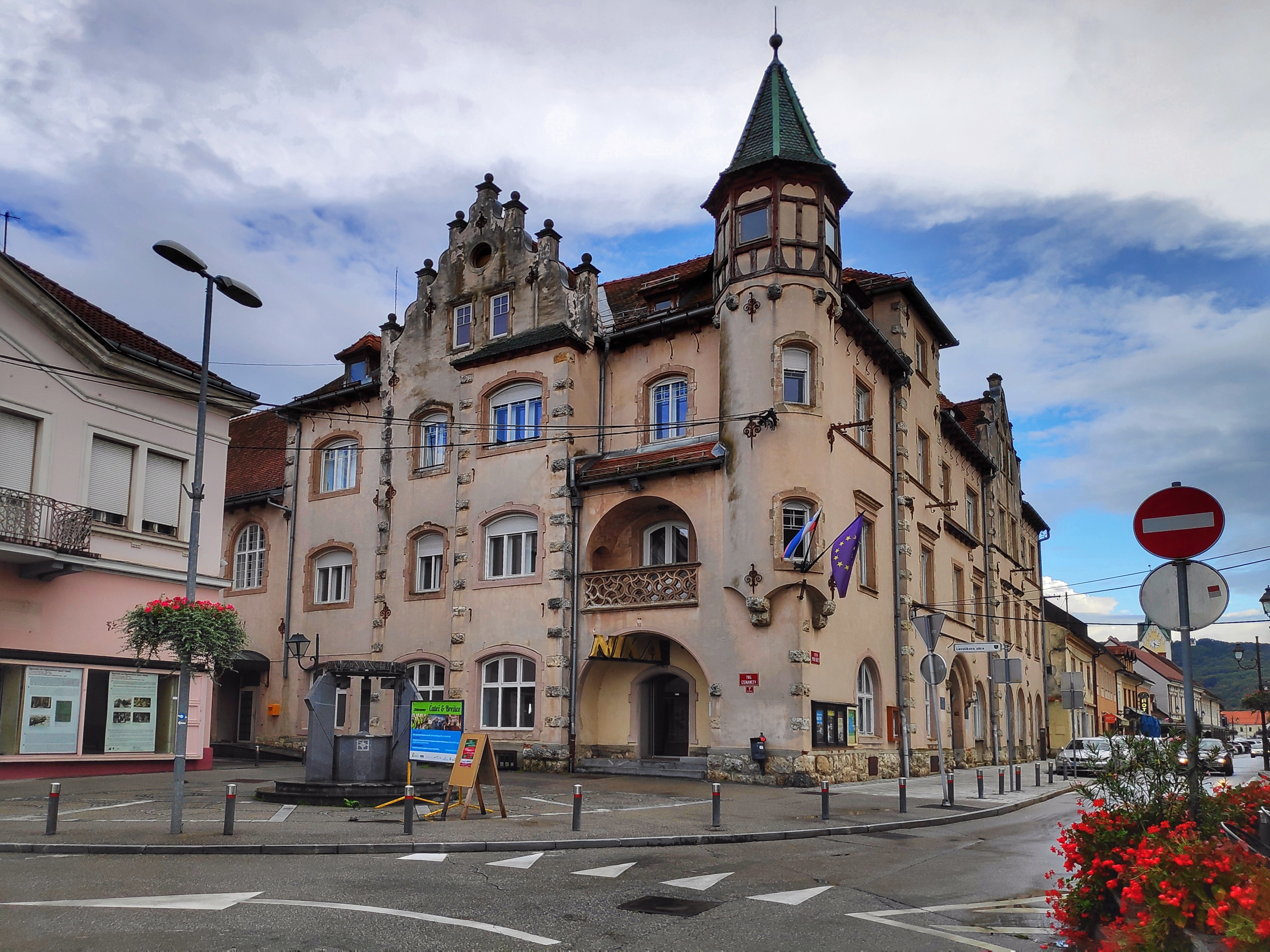
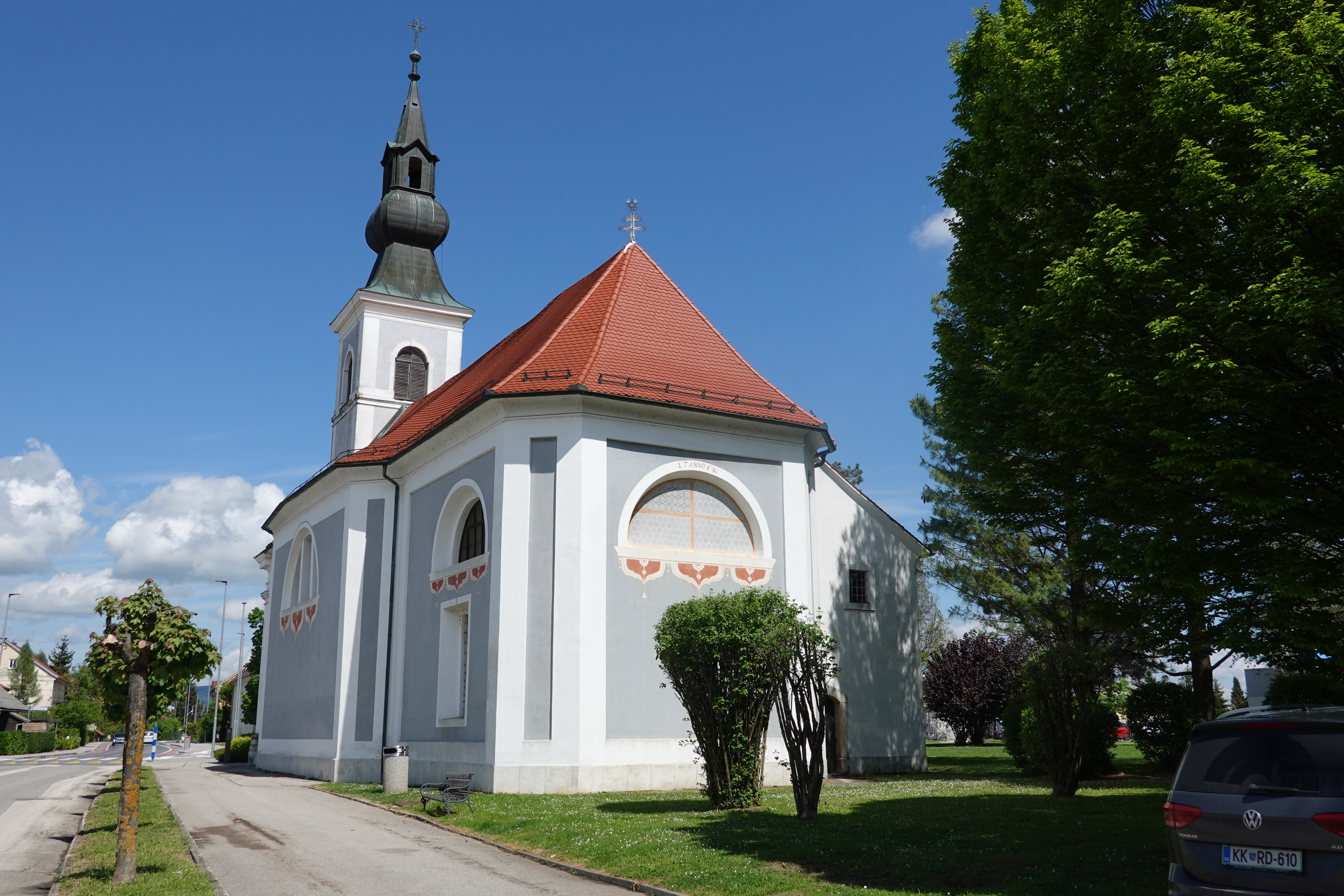
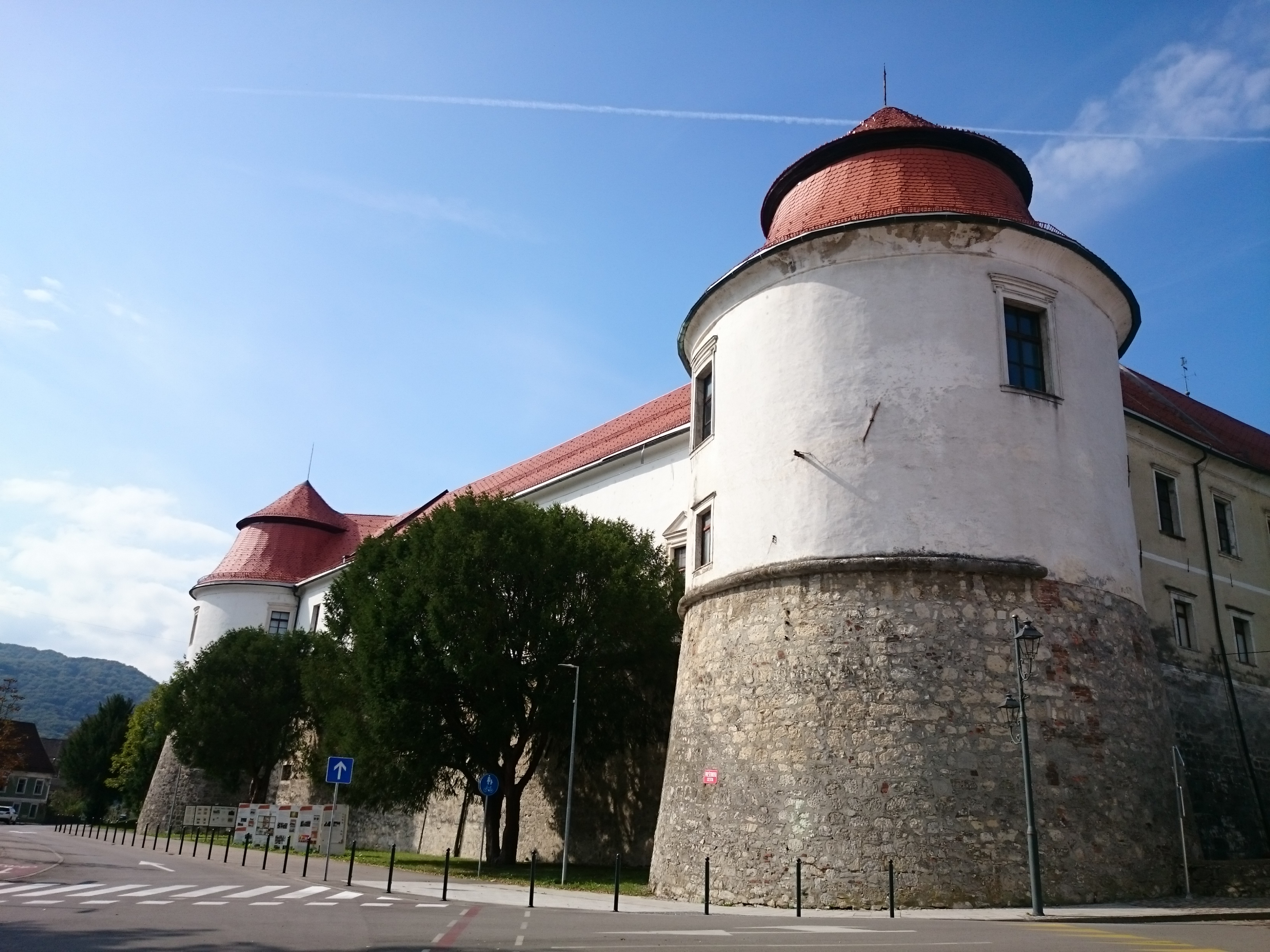
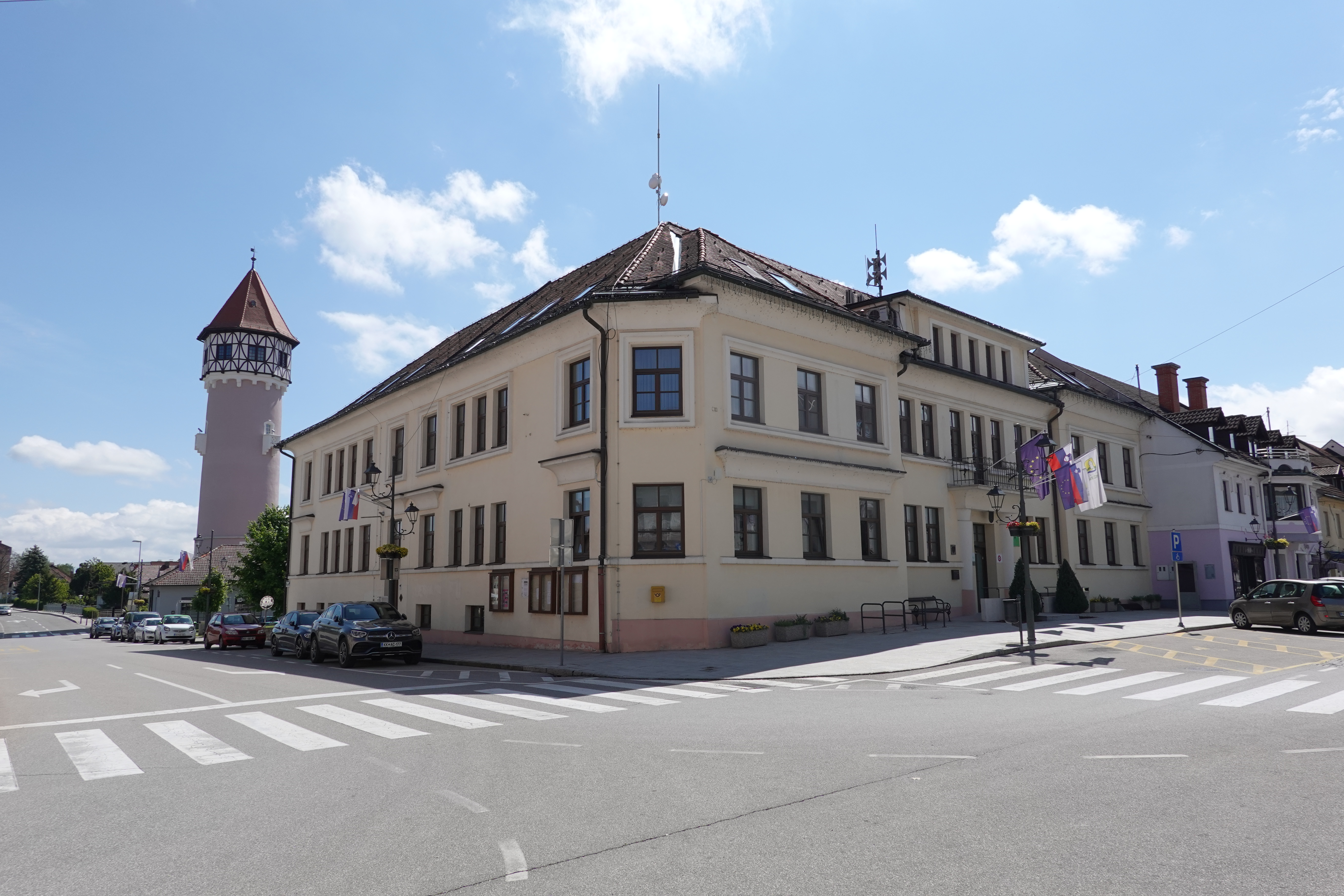
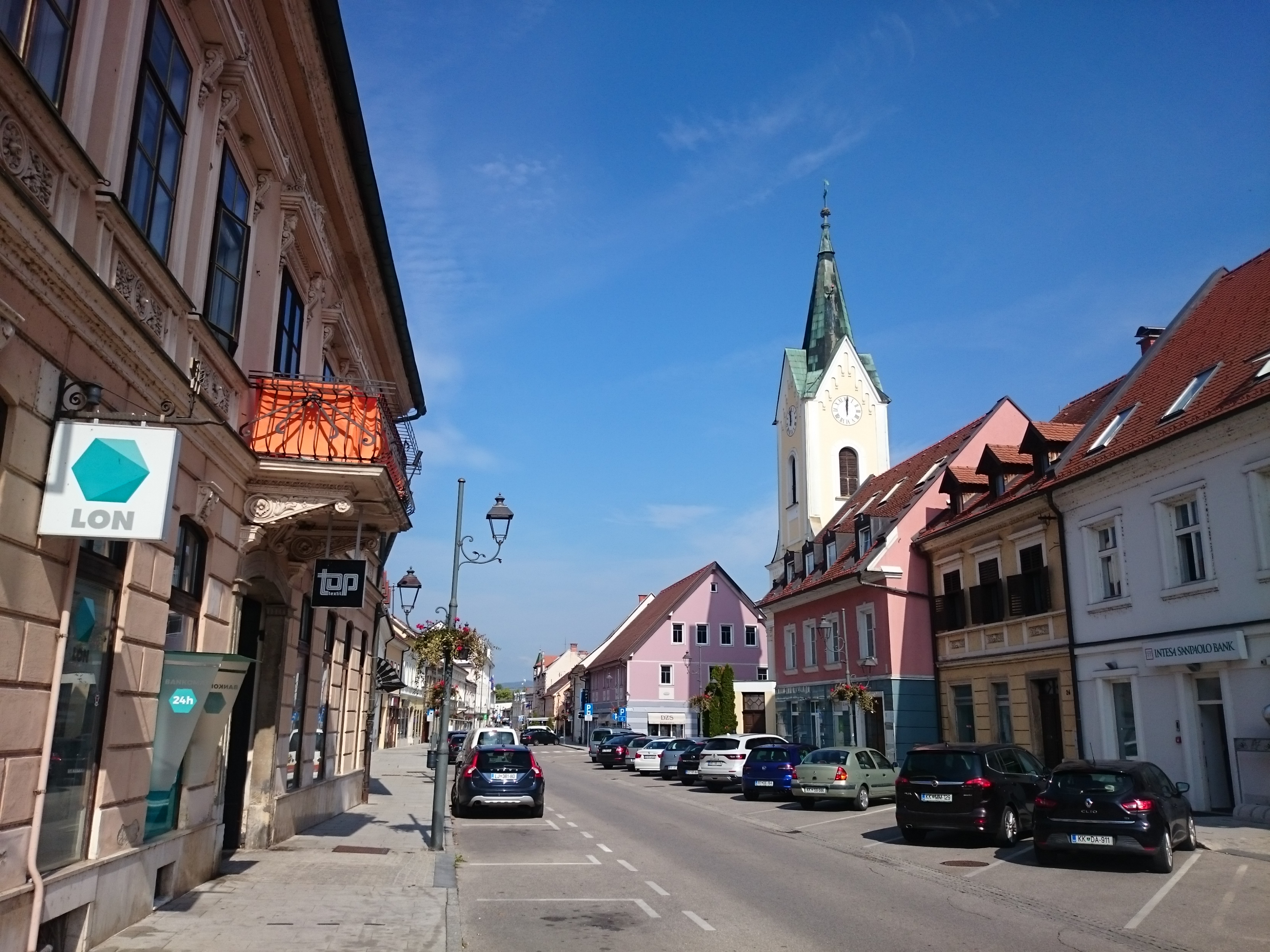
- From top, left to right: View from above, German House, Brežice Castle, Municipality Building and Water Tower, Town Center

- Location in Slovenia
- Coordinates: 45°54′24″N 15°35′46″E
- Country: Slovenia
- Traditional region: Styria
- Statistical region: Lower Sava
- Municipality: Brežice

Area
  - Total: 8.9 km^{2} (3.4 sq mi)
- Elevation: 162 m (531 ft)

Population (2020)
  - Total: 6,843
  - Density: 770/km^{2} (2,000/sq mi)
- Postal code: 8250 Brežice
- Vehicle registration: KK
- Climate: Cfb

Brežice (pronounced [ˈbɾèːʒitsɛ]; German: Rann [ʁan]) is a town in eastern Slovenia in the Lower Sava Valley, near the Croatian border. It is the seat of the Municipality of Brežice. It lies in the center of the Brežice Plain (Slovene: Brežiško polje), which is part of the larger Krka Flat (Slovene: Krška ravan). The area was traditionally divided between Lower Styria (territory on the left bank of the Sava River) and Lower Carniola (territory on the right bank of the Sava River). The entire municipality is now included in the Lower Sava Statistical Region.

Brežice prides itself on a rich historical and cultural heritage. The Lower Sava Valley Museum (Slovene: Posavski muzej Brežice), housed in Brežice Castle, contains archaeological and ethnological exhibits, exhibits on the Croatian and Slovenian peasant revolt, and a modern history collection. It is one of the largest regional museums in the country. A more recent landmark addition to the town is its water tower, as well as the double arches of the 527 m long iron bridge, which spans the Sava and Krka rivers.

== History ==
Celtic graves from the 2nd century BC have been discovered in Brežice, and it has been continuously settled since prehistoric times. A Slavic settlement called Gradišče was established at the site soon after the arrival of the Slovenes in the area. The castle in Brežice was first mentioned in 1249. The current structure dates to 1529.

Brežice was affected by Ottoman raids several times during the 15th and 16th centuries. Peasant uprisings took place during the 16th century; in 1515 peasants attacked the castle in Brežice, burned it, and killed the nobility sheltering in it. The new castle was able to withstand the peasant uprising of 1573.

The first school was established in Brežice in 1668, taught by Franciscan friars at the friary. From 1774 to 1780 instruction took place at Baron Moscon's residence, and from 1780 to 1820 at the rectory. A separate school building was built in 1875.

A general hospital was established in Brežice in 1872. Its facilities were expanded in 1889.

During the Second World War, Brežice and the adjacent countryside to the north and west were known as the Rann Triangle (German: Ranner Dreieck), an area intended for the resettlement of Gottschee Germans that had been evicted from the Gottschee region in the territory annexed by Italy.

Brežice expanded after the Second World War by annexing the neighboring villages of Brezina, Črnc, Šentlenart, Trnje, and Zakot.

Historical population
Year	1948	1953	1961	1971	1981	1991	2002	2011	2021
Pop.	1,349	1,823	2,641	3,271	4,043	6,862	6,510	6,573	6,888
±%	—	+35.1%	+44.9%	+23.9%	+23.6%	+69.7%	−5.1%	+1.0%	+4.8%
Population size may be affected by changes in administrative divisions.

== Churches ==
Saint Lawrence's Church in Brežice was first mentioned in written sources in the 12th century. It stood on the bank of the Sava (now an old side channel). It and the adjacent cemetery were heavily damaged by flooding in 1781, which also changed the course of the river, and the current church was built in the town center in 1782. Brežice has been the seat of a parish since 1641. Another church in the town, built in the second half of the 17th century, is dedicated to Saint Roch.

== Main sights ==
=== Brežice Castle ===
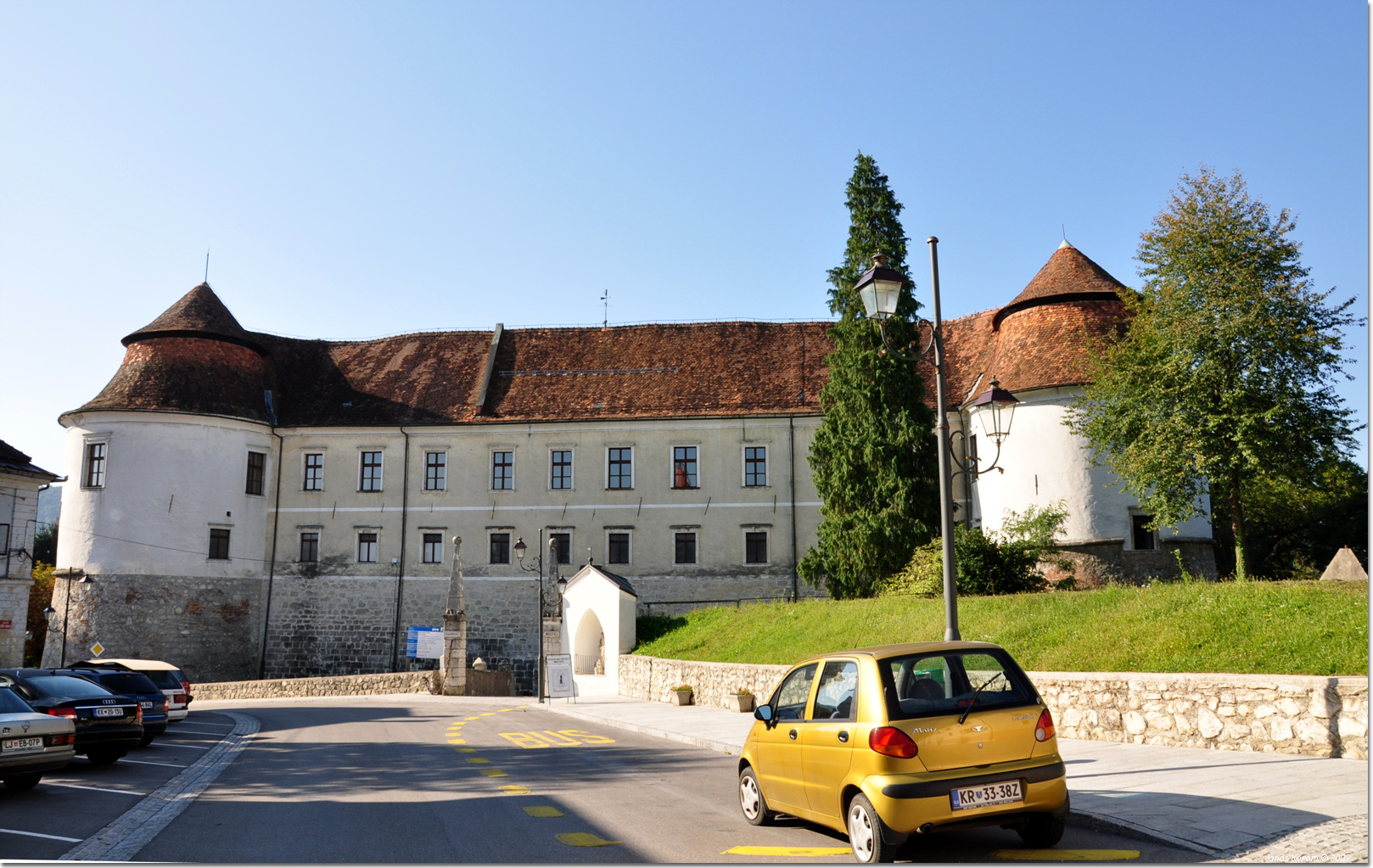
Brežice Castle

Brežice Castle is the dominant feature of the town, standing above the left bank of the Sava. It is now a museum housing several collections and exhibitions. In the castle chapel there is an altar by Luka Mislej.

=== Water Tower ===
The Brežice Water Tower is the most prominent structure in the town, and is regarded as its symbol. Built in 1914, it was a key part of the town's water supply system until it was replaced by a new reservoir in 1972, after which it had an auxiliary role until 1983.

== Education ==
=== Brežice Upper Secondary School ===
The Brežice Upper Secondary School (Slovene: Gimnazija Brežice) opened in 1945, is built on the site of a Franciscan friary. The school was renovated in 1966, when an extension was also added. 690 students attend the school.

=== Brežice Faculty of Tourism ===
The Faculty of Tourism was founded in December 2009 and is part of the University of Maribor, Slovenia's second-largest university. It is located in the center of the town on the main street, Cesta prvih borcev. In the 2012–2013 academic year it enrolled the first class of students in two three-year undergraduate programs in tourism: a vocational program and a bachelor's program. The faculty will also offer a master's program in tourism starting in the 2014–2015 academic year.

== Notable people ==
Notable people that were born or lived in Brežice include:

- Jurij Rovan (born 1975), pole vaulter
- Ivo Benkovič (1875–?), politician
- Albin Bregar (?–1894), religious writer
- Vojko Černelč (born 1934), editor and journalist
- Mirjan Damaška (born 1931), jurist
- Vanda Gerlovič (1925–2001), opera singer
- Anton Gvajc (1865–1935), painter
- Vera Horvat, (1906–?), painter
- Primož Kozmus (born 1979), Olympic and world hammer throw champion
- Anton Krošl (1905–1945), historian
- Jože Krošl (1894–1978), theologian and sociologist
- Franc Kruljc (1873–1954), theologian
- Dušan Kuščer (1920–), geologist
- Boris Lipužič (1930–), geographer
- Janez Mencinger (1838–1912), writer, translator, and lawyer
- Avgust Munda (1886–1971), ichthyologist
- Tomaž Petrovič (born 1979), football manager
- Leopold Poljanec (1872–1944), natural history expert
- Ljudmila Poljanec (1874–1948), poet
- Miloš Poljanšek (born 1923), Slavic studies specialist
- Karel Přibil (1877–1944), education expert and translator
- Georgius de Rain (Slovene: Jurij iz Brežic) (14th century – 1416), religious writer
- Radoslav Razlag (1826–1880), poet and politician
- Željko Ražnatović (1952–2000), Serb paramilitary leader, also known as "Arkan"
- Marija Rus (1921–2019), Slovenian Romance philologist, professor of French, translator, poet
- Lavoslav Schwentner (1865–1952), publisher
- Marjan Sidaritsch (1895–1925), agricultural geographer
- Boris Sikošek (born 1922), geologist and tectonics expert
- Gvidon Srebre (1839–1926), lawyer and politician
- Franjo Stiplovšek (1898–1963), painter and graphic artist
- Viktor Tiller (1878–1961), local historian and geographer
- Andrej Urek (1836–1904), poet
- Jaka Žorga (1888–1942), politician

== Gallery ==
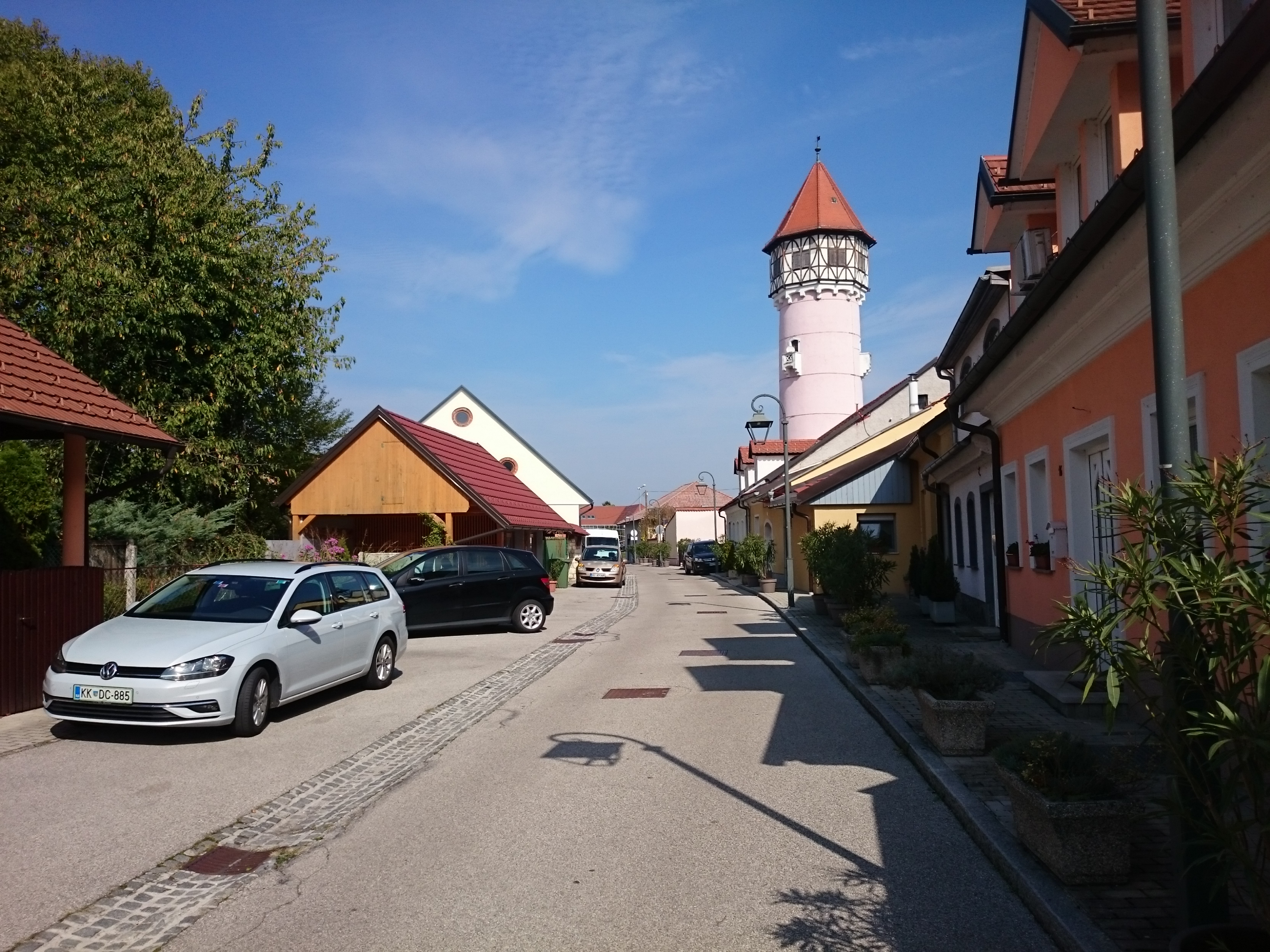
Old Justice Street

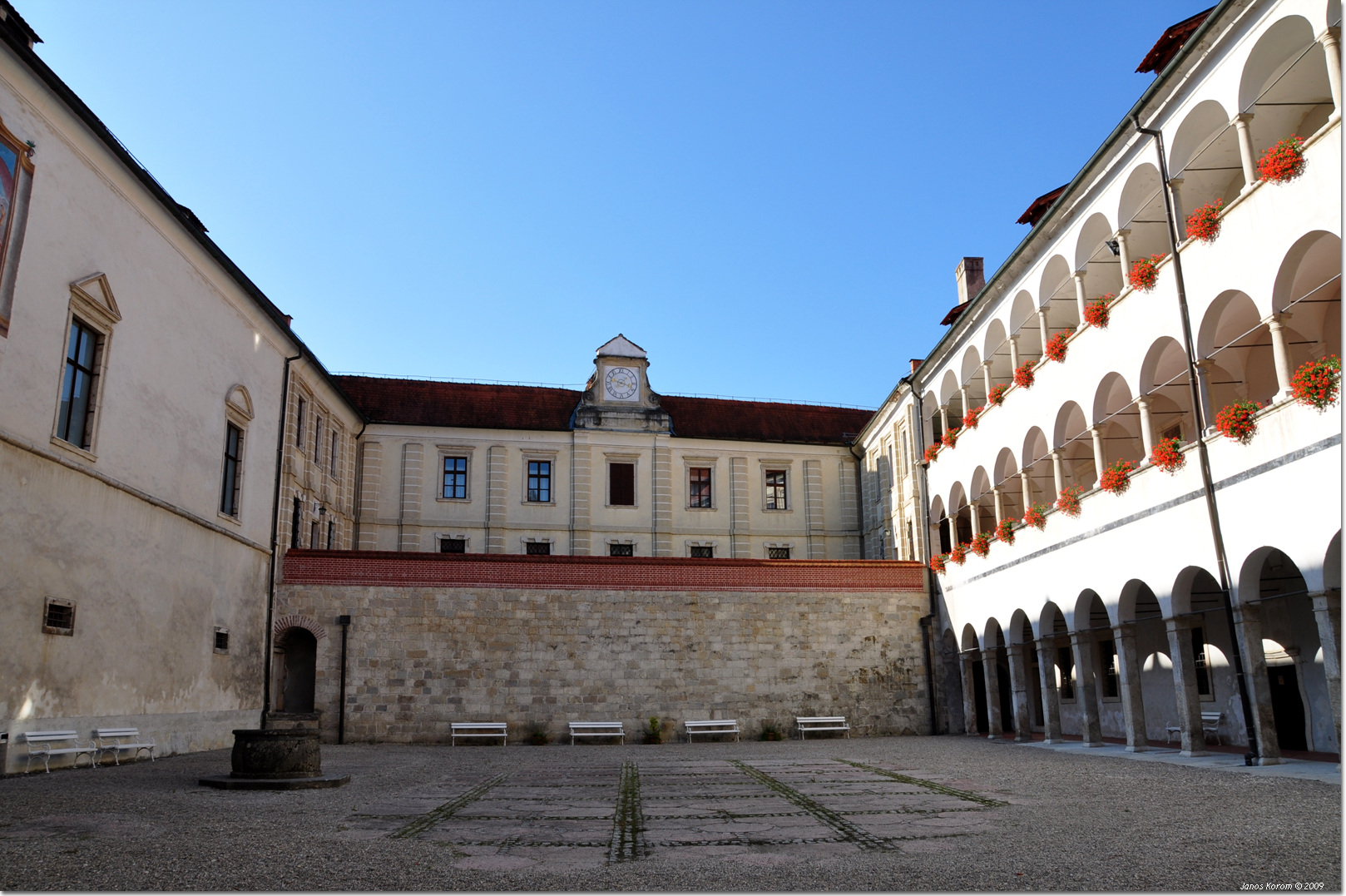
Castle Courtyard

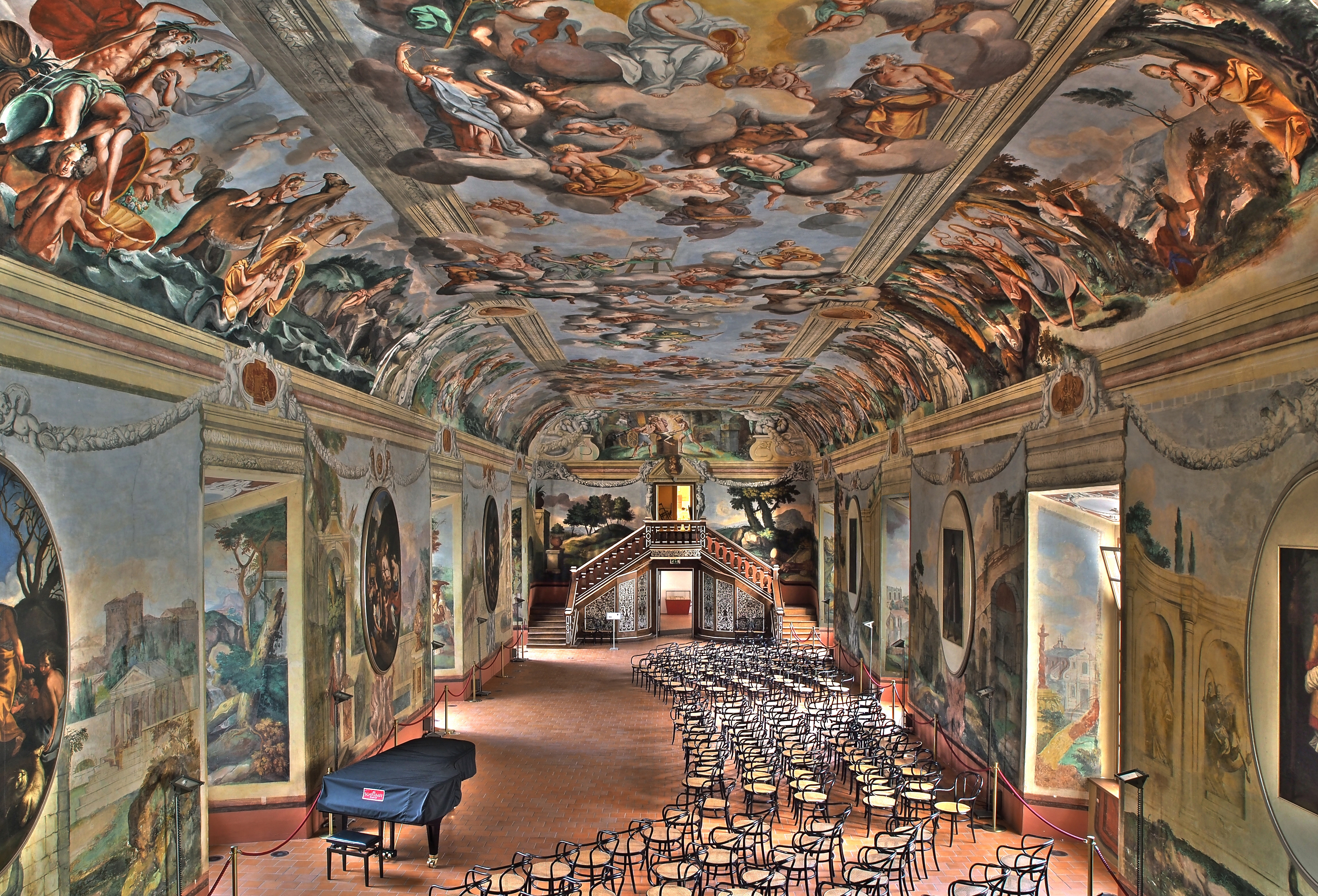
Hall of Knights

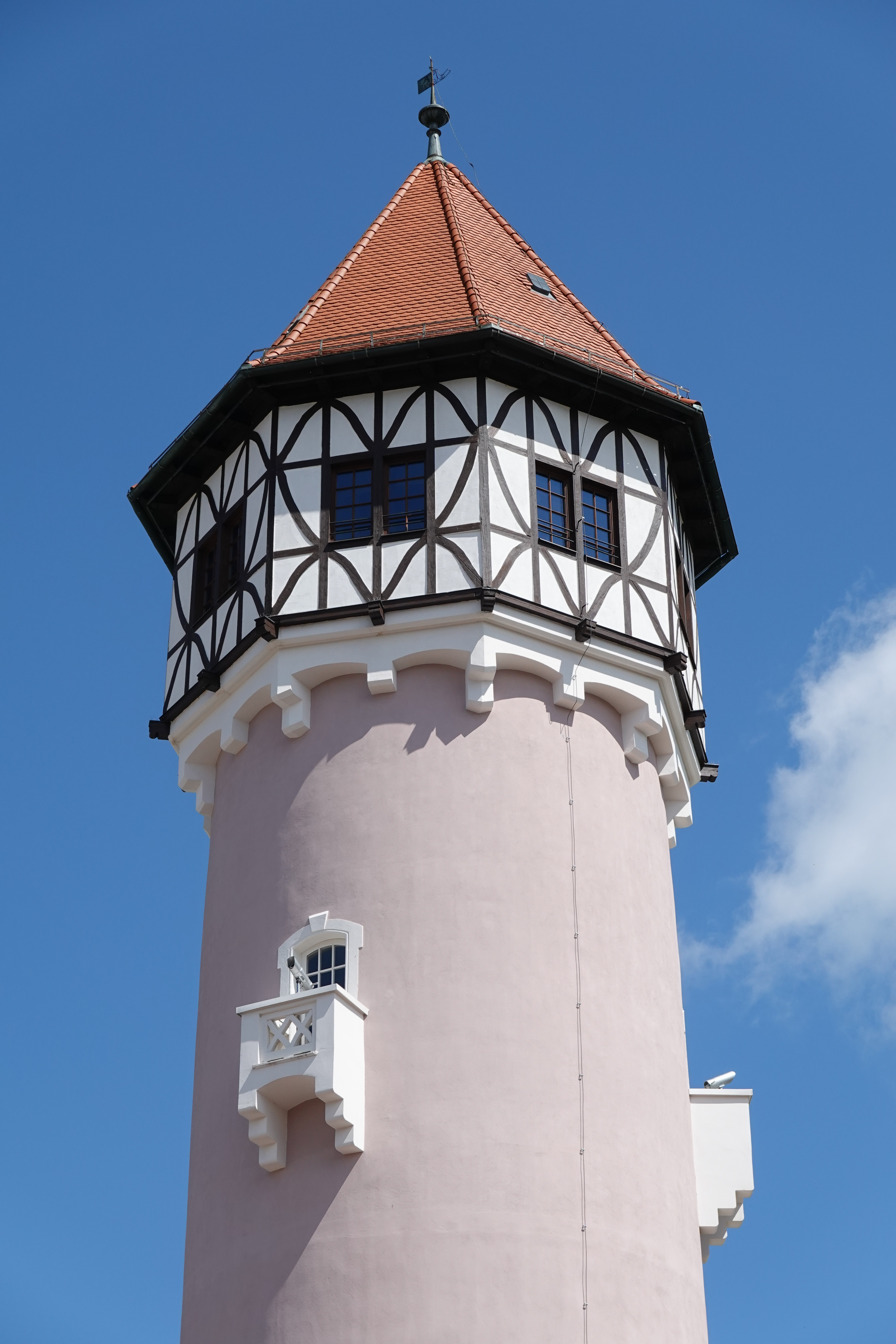
Water Tower

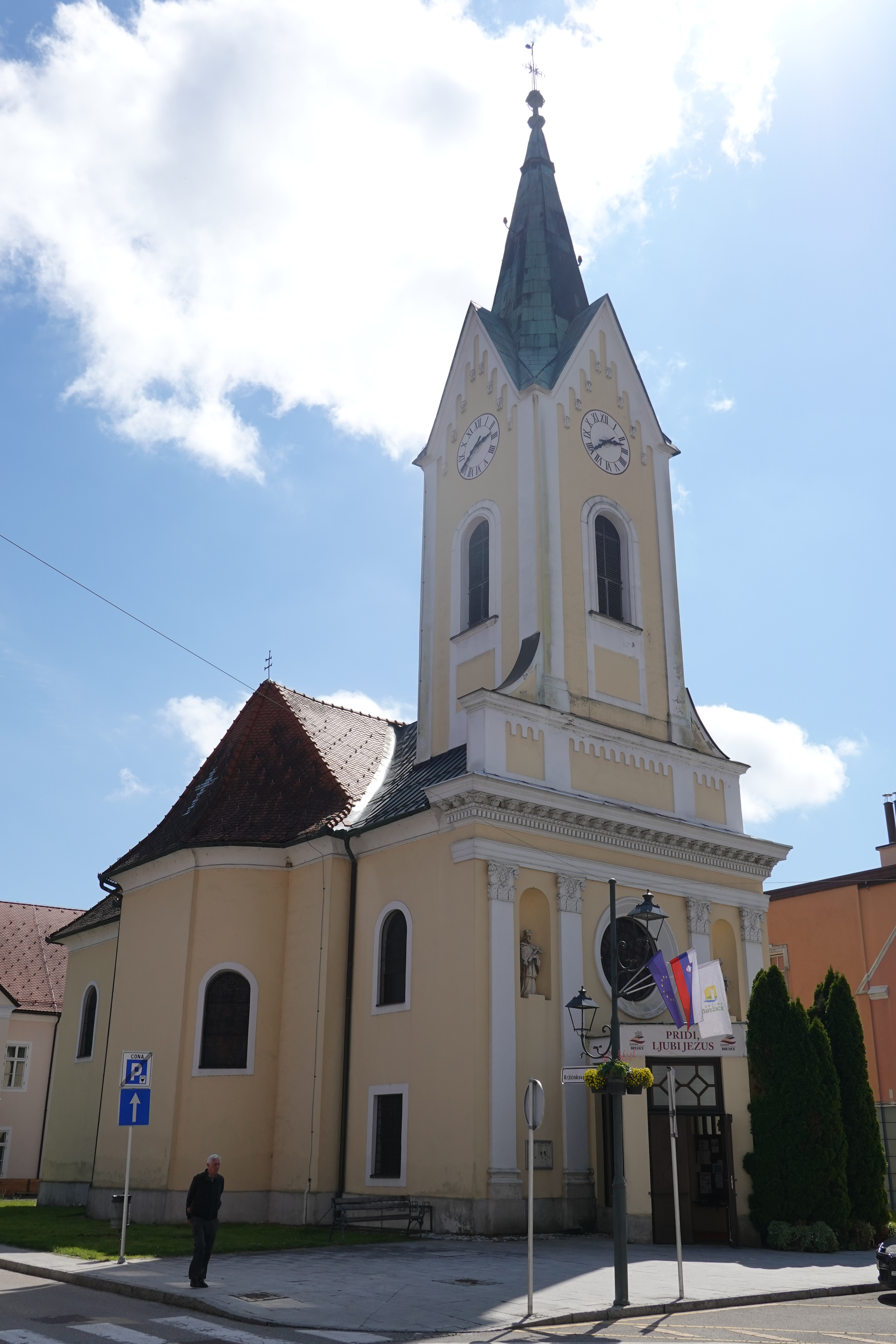
St. Lawrence's Church

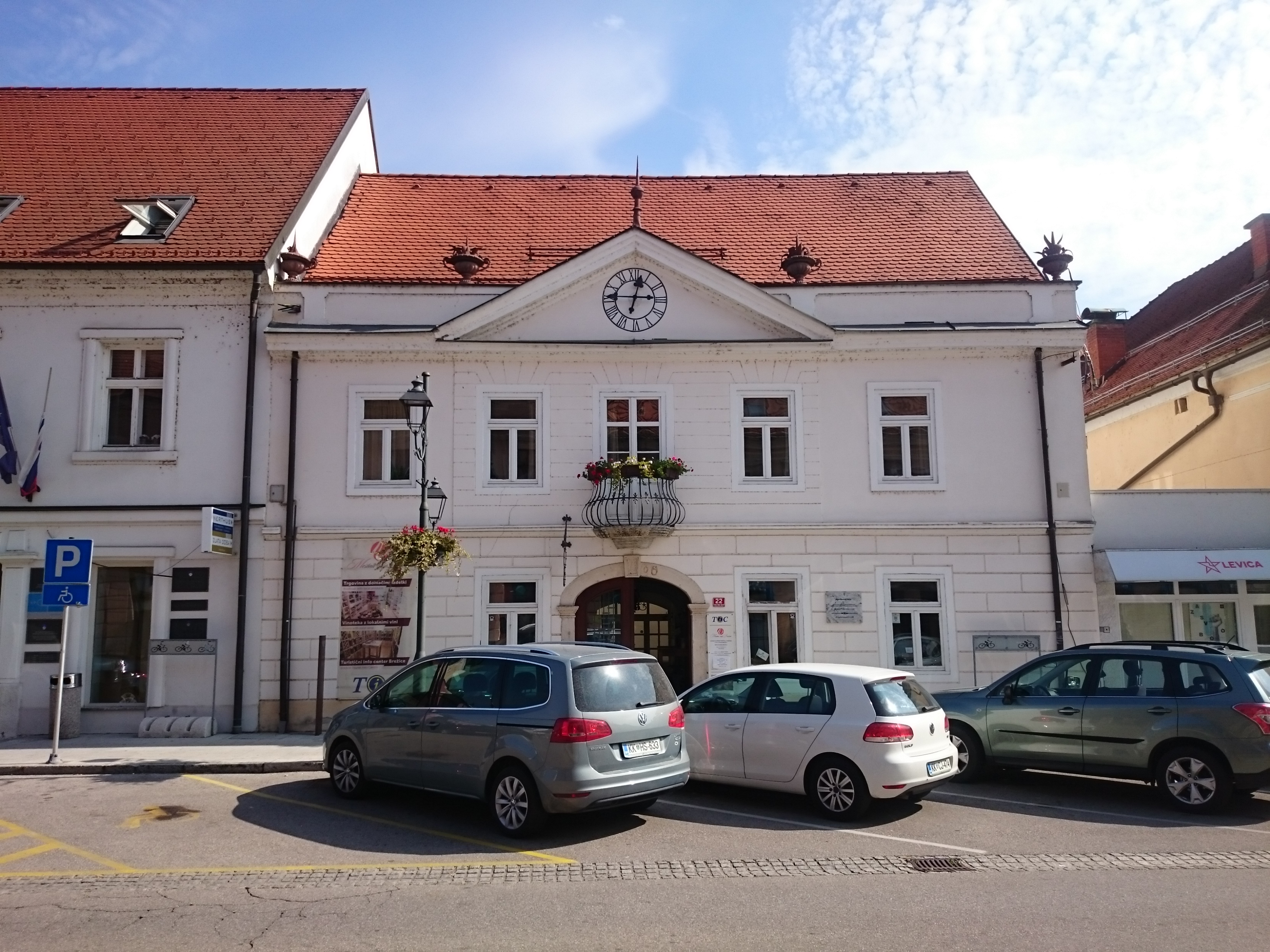
Former Town Hall

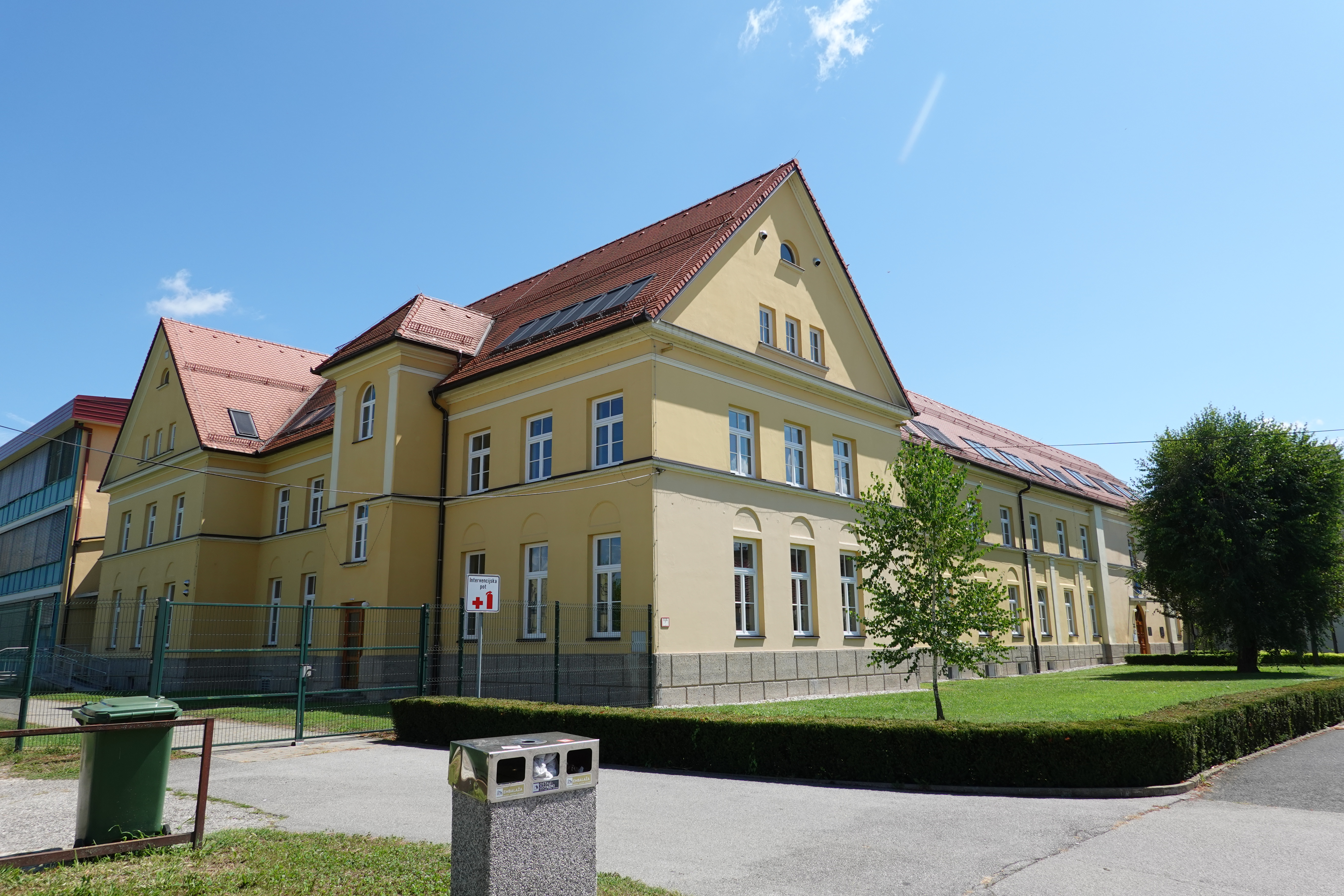
Grammar School

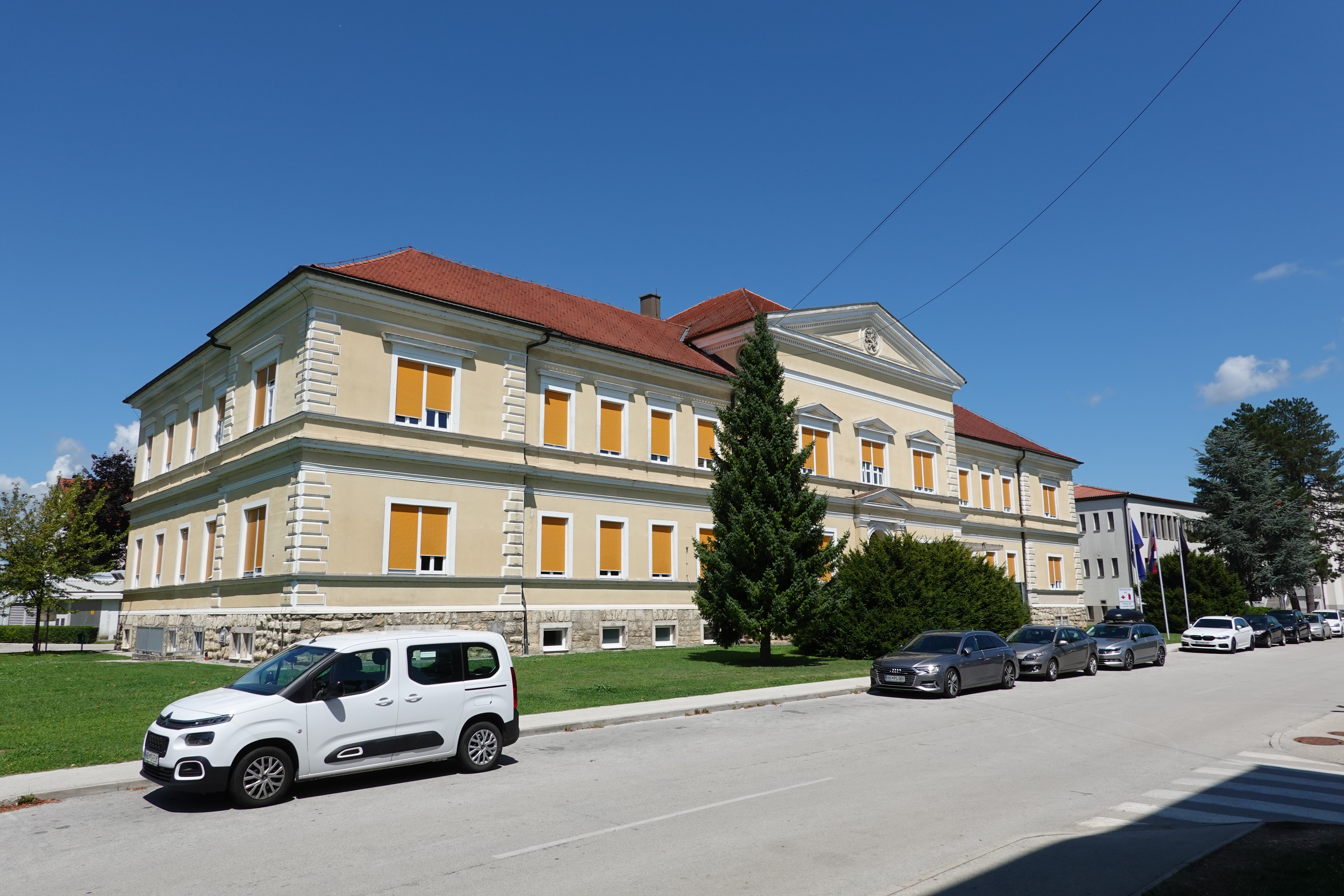
General Hospital

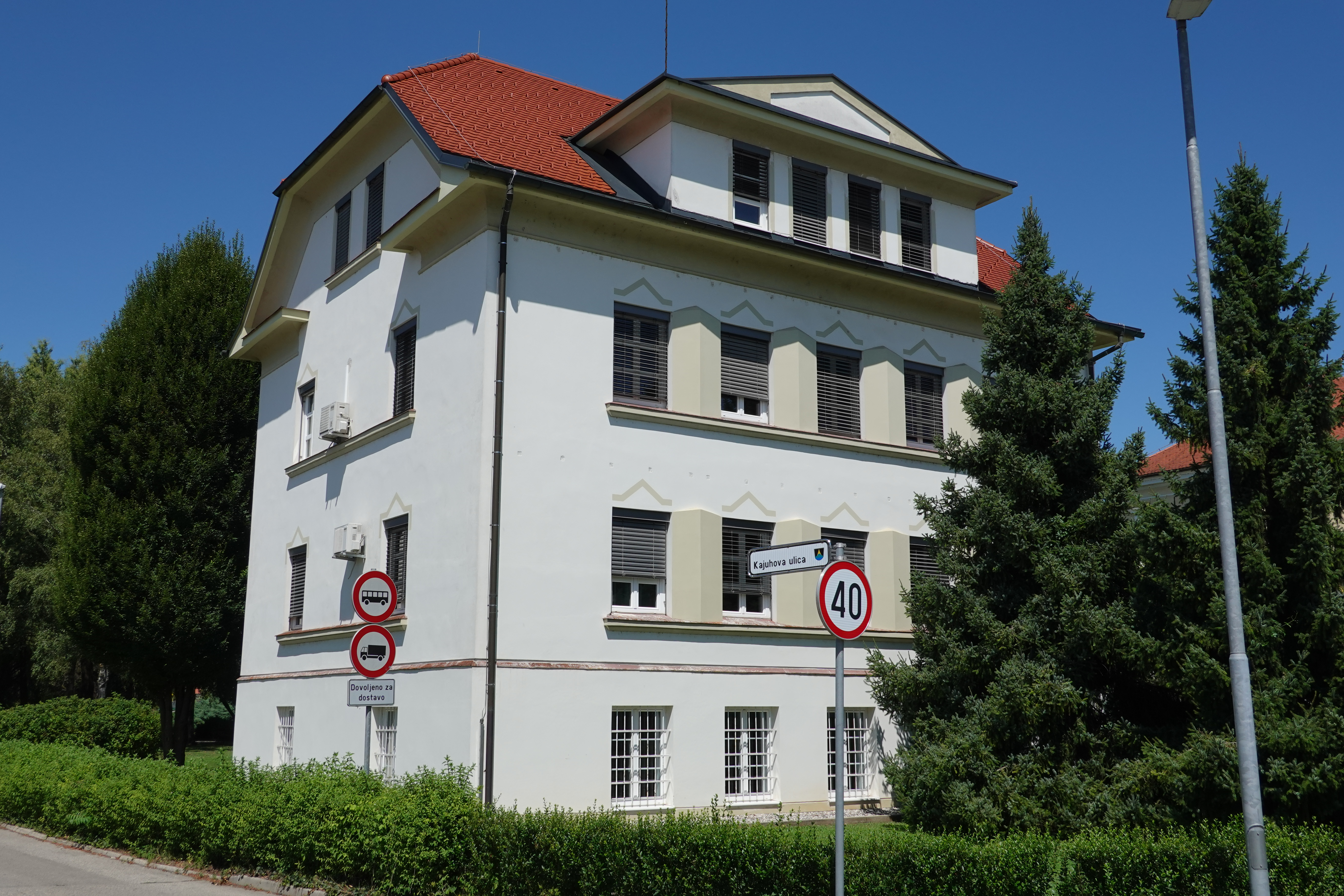
Hospital Building

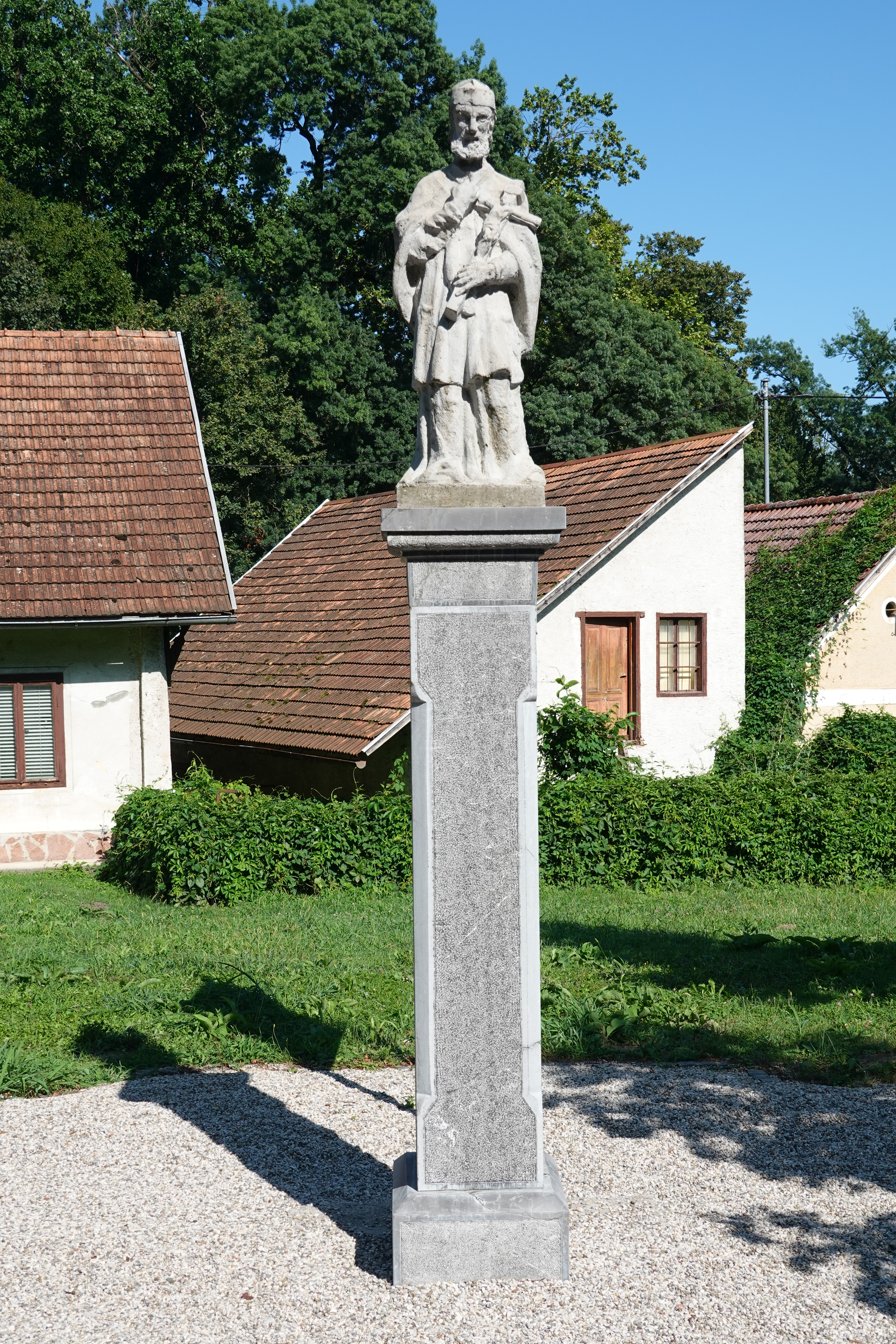
John of Nepomuk Column

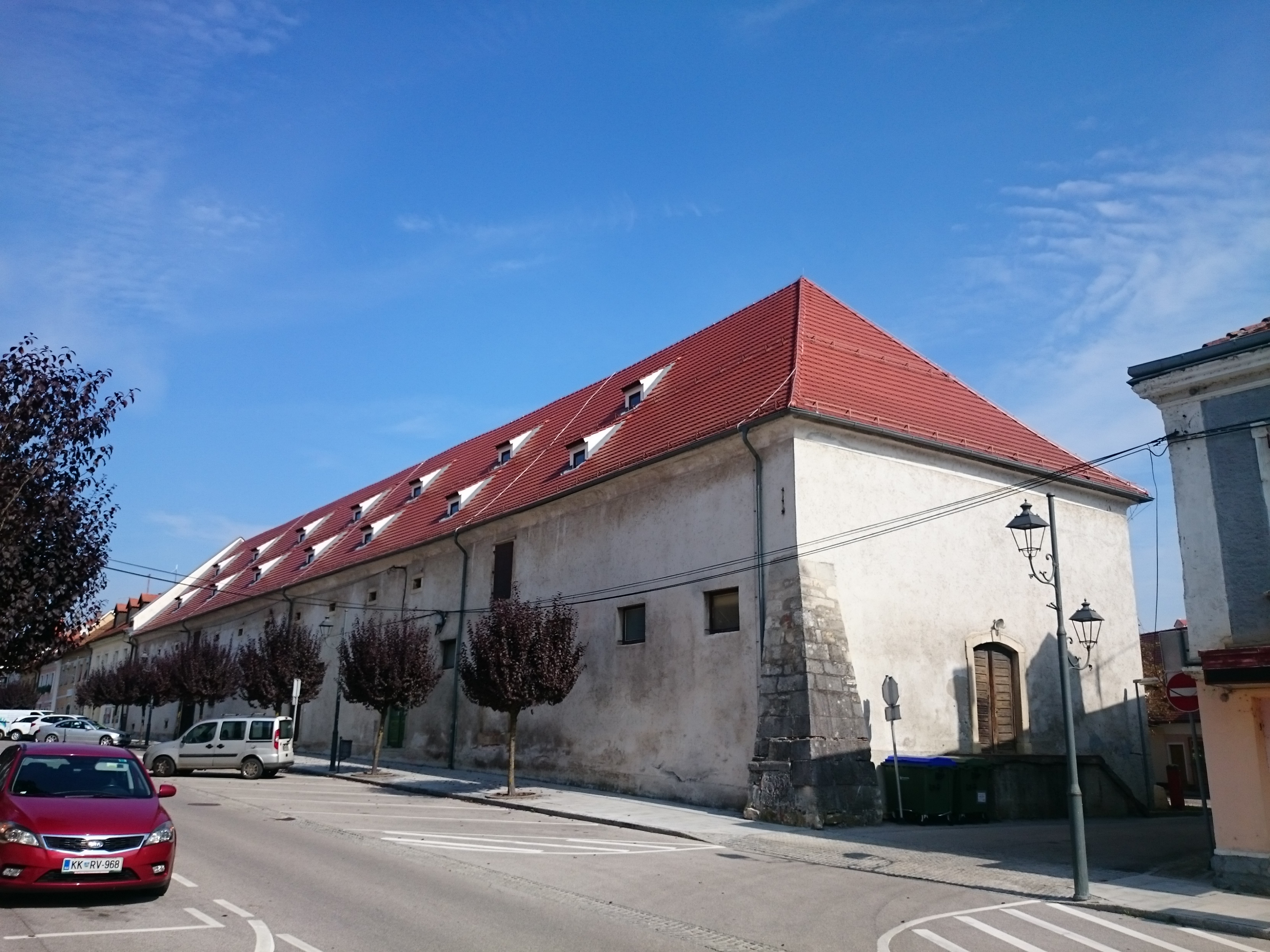
Castle Granary

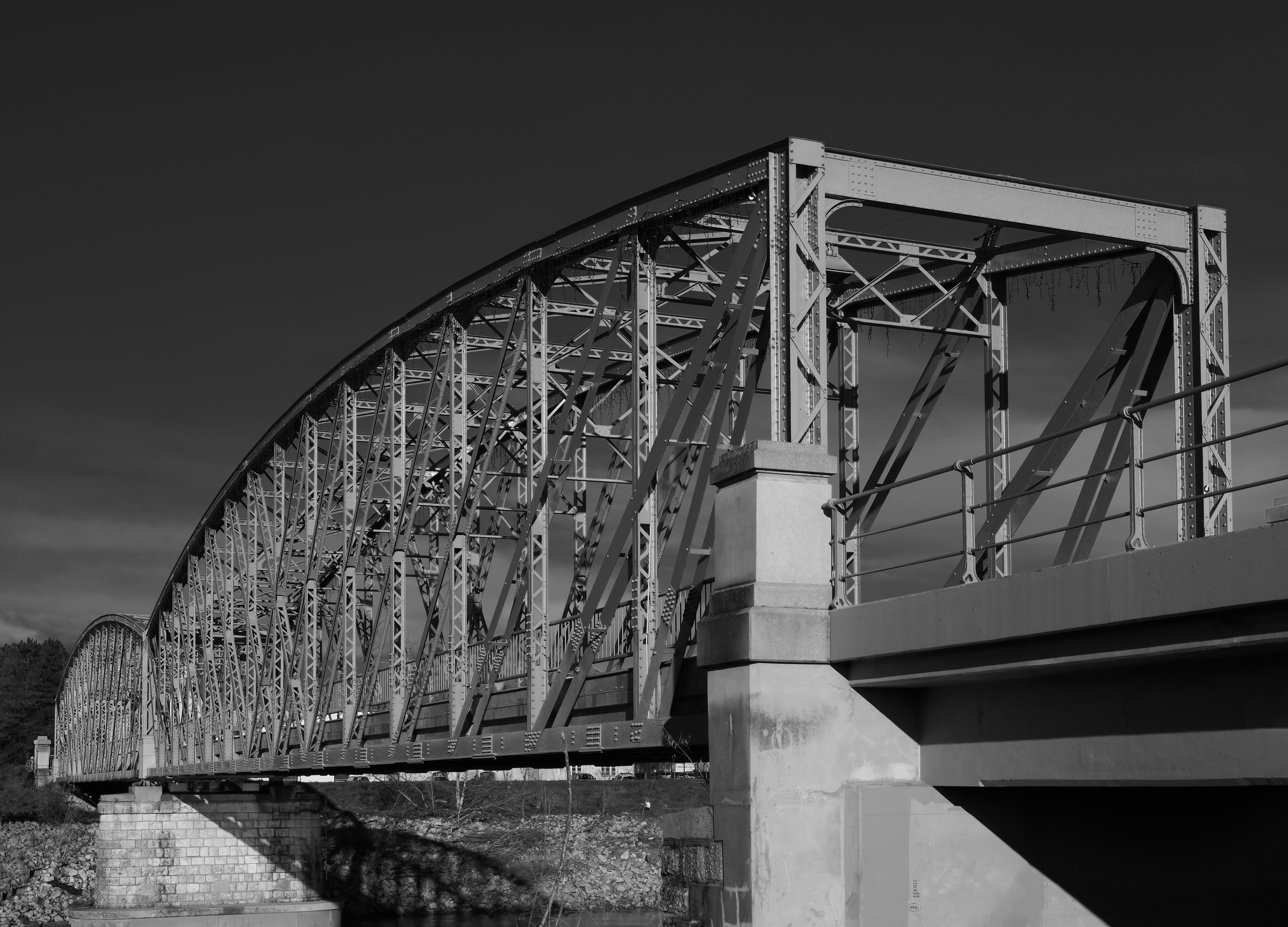
Iron Bridge

View on Old Town and Iron Bridge

== See also ==
- Brežice railway station
