= Šentlenart, Brežice =

Šentlenart
- Location in Slovenia
- Coordinates: 45°55′11.73″N 15°35′11.60″E
- Country: Slovenia
- Traditional region: Styria
- Statistical region: Lower Sava
- Municipality: Brežice
- Elevation: 156 m (512 ft)

Šentlenart (pronounced [sɛnˈtleːnaɾt] or [sənˈtleːnaɾt]; in older sources also Sveti Lenart, German: Sankt Leonhard) is a former settlement in the Municipality of Brežice in eastern Slovenia, close to the border with Croatia. It is now part of the town of Brežice. The area is part of the traditional region of Styria. It is now included with the rest of the municipality in the Lower Sava Statistical Region.

== History ==
Šentlenart was annexed by Brežice in 1981, ending its existence as an independent settlement.

== Church ==
The church in Šentlenart is a chapel of ease dedicated to Saint Leonard. It stands on the site of a former chapel that appeared in written sources in 1443. The church was remodeled in 1840. It is believed to have been the original seat of the Parish of Brežice.
