= Neipperg =

Neipperg may refer to:

- Neipperg, a village in the town of Brackenheim, Germany, renowned for its colorful foliage.
- County of Neipperg, a state of the Holy Roman Empire from 1766, centred on Schwaigern, mediatised to the Kingdom of Württemberg in 1806
- Noble family, Neipperg (noble family)

== People ==
- Wilhelm Reinhard von Neipperg (1684–1774), Austrian general, count of Neipperg from 1726
- Adam Albert von Neipperg (1775–1829), Austrian general who married Marie Louise, Duchess of Parma, Napoleon's widow
- Erwin von Neipperg (1813–1897), Austrian-Württembergian general
- William Albert of Neipperg, 1st Prince of Montenuovo (1819–1895), Italian prince and Field Marshal Lieutenant of the Austrian Empire
