= Johann Adam von Auersperg =

Czech-Austrian landowner and courtier (1721–1795)

- Prince of Auersperg
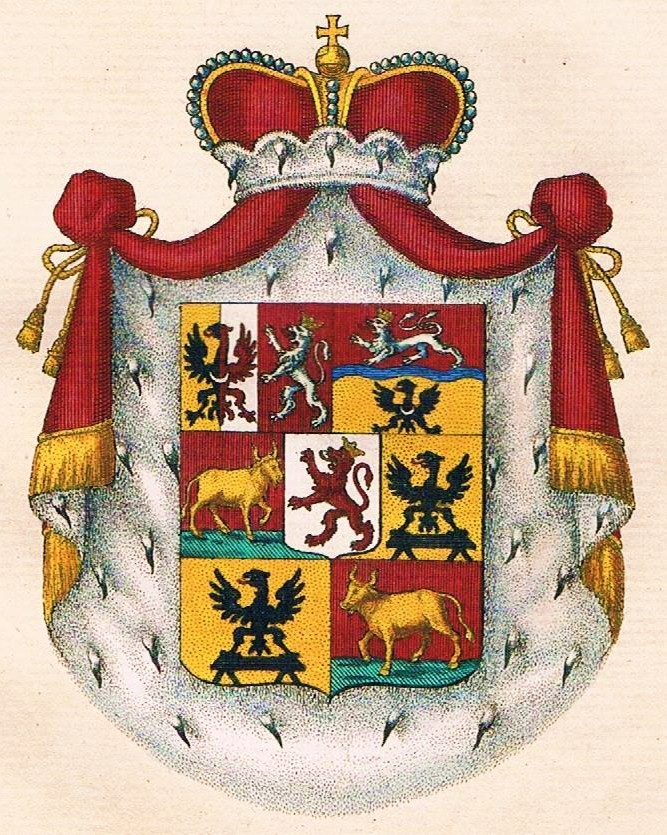
- Successor: Vincenz Karl Joseph von Auersperg
- Full name: Joannes Adamus Antonius Josephus Augustinus Albertus Franciscus
- Born: 27 August 1721; Vienna, Holy Roman Empire
- Died: 11 November 1795 (aged 74); Vienna, Holy Roman Empire
- Buried: Church of the Nativity of the Virgin Mary (Žleby)
- Noble family: House of Auersperg
- Spouses: Countess Katharina von Schönfeld (m. 1746; died 1753) Maria Wilhelmina von Neipperg (m. 1755; died 1775)
- Issue Detail: Joseph von Auersperg
- Father: Heinrich Joseph Johann of Auersperg
- Mother: Marie Dominika von und zu Liechtenstein
- Occupation: Lord Chamberlain, Hereditary Marshal of Tyrol

Johann Adam Joseph, Prince of Auersperg (Joannes Adamus Antonius Josephus Augustinus Albertus Franciscus, 27 August 1721 – 11 November 1795) was a Czech-Austrian landowner and court dignitary of the Auersperg family. He held, among other offices, the positions of Lord Chamberlain and Hereditary Marshal of Tyrol. In 1746 he received the title of imperial prince and became the founder of the Auersperg secundogeniture.

== Biography ==
=== 1721–1763: Before his princedom ===
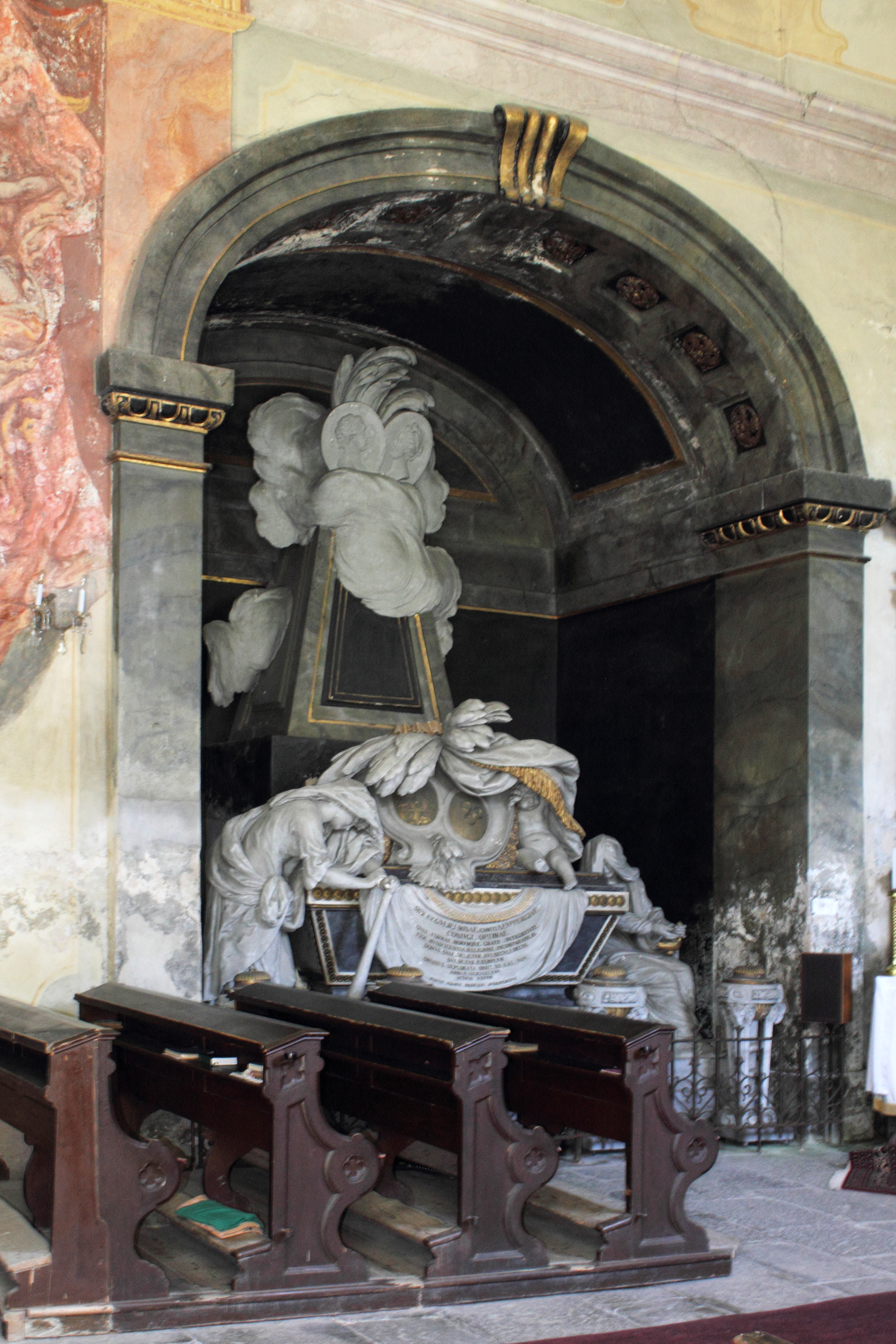
Gravestone in Žleby

Johann Adam von Auersperg was the second-born son of Heinrich Joseph Johann, 4th Prince of Auersperg and Duke of Silesia-Münsterberg (1697–1783), and came from his first marriage to Marie Dominika, Princess of Liechtenstein (1698–1724), a daughter of Johann Adam Andreas, Prince of Liechtenstein, Duke of Opava and Jägerndorf and his wife Edmunda Maria Theresia, Princess of Dietrichstein-Nikolsburg.

Thanks to his father's position, he was one of the influential personalities of the imperial court in Vienna from his youth, he was appointed imperial chamberlain, later he became a privy councillor. In 1745, he participated in the imperial coronation of Franz Stephen of Lorraine in Frankfurt. On the occasion of his first marriage to Catherine of Schönfeld, a wealthy heiress to several estates in Bohemia, he was promoted to imperial prince in 1746, and his title was confirmed in 1747 for the Kingdom of Bohemia.

=== 1763–1795: Princedom ===
In 1764 he attended another imperial coronation of Joseph II in Frankfurt, and with the announcement of this event he went to London as an extraordinary ambassador, and for his merits he was then decorated with the Hungarian Order of St. Stephen. He hosted members of the imperial family several times on his Czech estates, where he organized festivities and hunts. He organized the largest hunt in 1790 in Žleby on the occasion of the marriage of the future Emperor Francis I with the Princess Maria Theresa of Naples. At the invitation of her father, King Ferdinand IV of Naples, he then went to Naples, where he received the Order of St. Januarius. In 1791, he participated in the Prague coronation of Leopold II as King of Bohemia.

After his mother, he and his brother Karel were co-owners of the North Bohemian estate of Červený Hrádek together with other attached estates. On the basis of a family agreement, he finally became the sole and independent owner of the manor in 1766. On the occasion of Joseph II's visit to northern Bohemia, he had the hunting lodge Kalek built (1766), and he also modified the interiors of the Červený hrádek chateau. In 1771, he sold the entire estate for one million guldens to Jan Alexander Rottenhan. After the death of his first wife in 1753, he became the universal heir to her extensive property in Eastern Bohemia and the extinct family of Count family of Schönfeld auf Nassaberg. It was the Nasavrky manor with 88 villages, then the Tupadly and Žleby manors with the attached Slatiňany estate. With this property worth more than one million guldens, Jan Adam became one of the largest landowners in the Kingdom of Bohemia with an annual yield of approximately 48,000 guldens.

Maria Catherine, born in Schönfeld, had the Tupadly Castle modified in the Baroque style during her lifetime and created a fideikomis from her father's inheritance. After taking over the property in 1754, Jan Adam began a number of construction activities on his Czech estates. At that time, the administration of the Nasavrky estate was at the castle in Seč, because the fortress in Nasavrky was dilapidated. After 1754, the chateau in Nasavrky was rebuilt and the central administration of the manor returned here. For occasional stays or economic needs, several smaller Baroque castles were rebuilt or newly built (Lipka, Lukavice, Zaječice). Several farmyards were also established, in addition, Prince Jan Adam was also engaged in business (pyrite mines in Lukavice). The main residence of the Auerspergs in Bohemia became the Žleby Chateau, which was rebuilt in the Baroque style after the second marriage of Johann Adam and Maria Wilhelmina of Neipperg.

A popular summer residence for the family was the chateau in Slatiňany, which underwent reconstruction in two stages in 1755 and in the 80s of the 18th century, the chateau then acquired a three-winged layout with an honorary courtyard. The main residences of the Auersperg family in Žleby and Slatiňany have their current appearance only from the 19th century after neo-Gothic reconstructions. In Bohemia he also owned the castle and the lordship of Rothenhaus, which he sold to Johann Alexander von Rottenhan in 1771. On 8 October 1777 he acquired the Rosenkavalier-Palais in Vienna, which has since had the name Palais Auersperg.

Since his own sons died prematurely, he appointed the second son of his older brother Karl Josef Anton, Karl Joseph Franz von Auersperg, as heir. After Johann Adam von Auersperg realized that his marriage to Josepha von Lobkowitz remained childless, he adopted the newborn son of Karl Joseph Franz's older brother Wilhelm von Auersperg-Gottschee, Vincenz von Auersperg, in 1790 and appointed him as his universal heir. Vincenz von Auersperg took over the lordships of Nassaberg, Schleb and Tupadl in 1811 after reaching the age of majority, but died the following year; the inheritance fell to his son Vincenz Karl Joseph von Auersperg (1812–1867). Vincenz's widow Marie Gabriele, née Princess von Lobkowitz, found the admiration of Tsar Alexander I during the Congress of Vienna.

== Marriage and issue ==
Johann was married twice, first from 1746 to Countess Katharina von Schönfeld (1728–1753), then from 10 April 1755 to Countess Maria Wilhelmina von Neipperg (1738–1775), mistress of Francis I, this marriage was allegedly wish by Maria Theresa, and was childless. His issue, all by Katharina Gräfin von Schönfeld, was:

- Franziska von Auersperg (1 March 1748 – 1752), died in childhood;
- Joseph von Auersperg (19 March 1749 – 1772), eldest son;
- Karl von Auersperg (August 1750 – 1752), died in childhood;
- Maria Theresia von Auersperg (1 February 1751 – 1754), died in childhood;
- Maria Elisabeth Aloisia von Auersperg (24 May 1753 – 1754), died in childhood.
