= Zaječice =

Zaječice is may refer to places in the Czech Republic:

- Zaječice (Chrudim District), a municipality and village in the Pardubice Region
- Zaječice, a village and administrative part of Bečov in the Ústí nad Labem Region
- Zaječice, a village and administrative part of Pyšely in the Central Bohemian Region
- Zaječice, a village and administrative part of Vrskmaň in the Ústí nad Labem Region
