= Neipperg (noble family) =

Noble family in northern Swabia

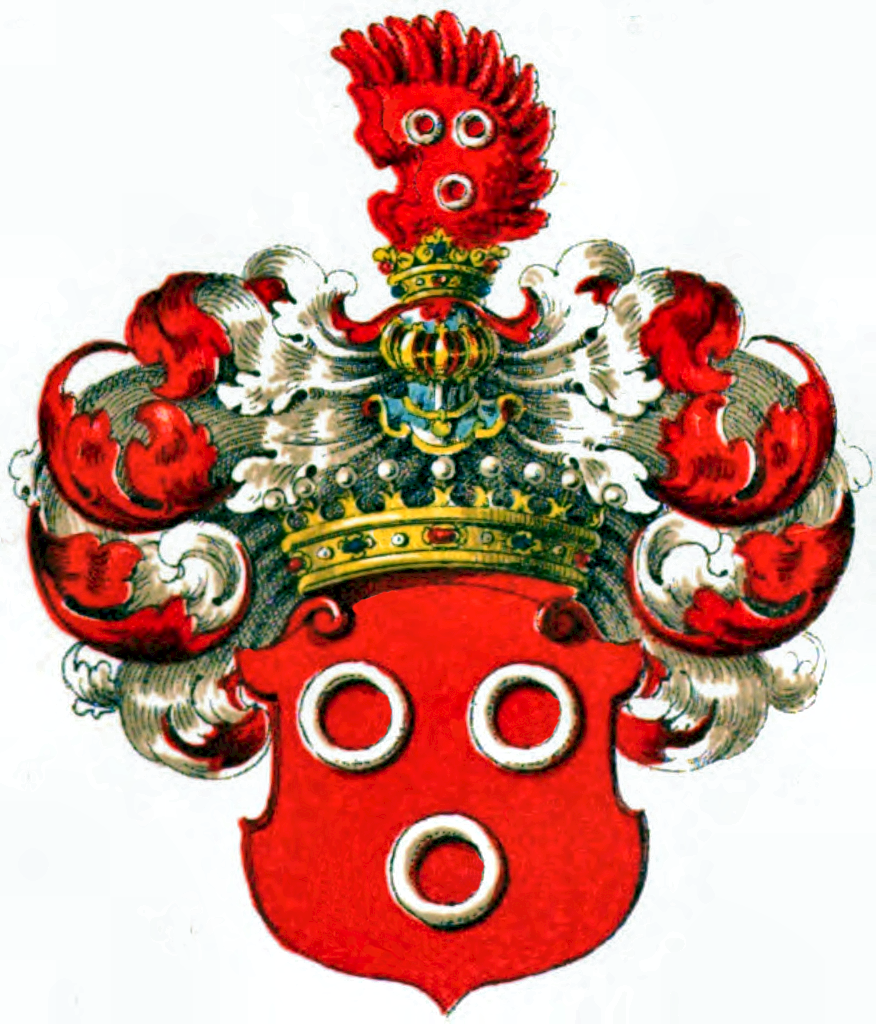
Coat of arms of the Counts of Neipperg

The lords, imperial knights, counts, and imperial counts of Neipperg are an ancient noble family from northern Swabia. The Franconian-Swabian family of Neipperg, named after Neipperg Castle (Niberch) near Brackenheim in the district of Heilbronn since 1241, descends from Bertilo von Schwaigern, who was first mentioned in 1120. In 1302, the family acquired the Schwaigern estate in Kraichgau. Elevated to the rank of Imperial Counts in 1726, they attained imperial status in 1766 as personalists in the Swabian Imperial Counts' Bench, thereby joining the high nobility.

In addition to Klingenberg, acquired in 1407, the Counts of Neipperg owned the estates of Massenbachhausen, Adelshofen, and half or three-eighths of Gemmingen, which were acquired in 1737 and belonged to the Canton Kraichgau of the Swabian Knightly Circle. The Neipperg family's ancestral domain fell under the rule of Württemberg and Baden in 1802 and became part of the federal state of Baden-Württemberg via Württemberg in 1951–1962. The main line of the Counts of Neipperg still resides today at Schwaigern Castle and manages agricultural and forestry businesses, as well as vineyards in Swabia and southern France.

The Neippergs served in Württemberg and the Palatinate for centuries, and from 1700 onwards, they held high administrative offices in the Austrian monarchy in the service of the Habsburg imperial family. The main line of the Neipperg family in Schwaigern, elevated to the rank of Imperial Count in 1726, gave rise to a branch that was elevated to the Austrian princely rank in 1864 as the Princes of Montenuovo.

== Overview of the history of the von Neipperg family ==
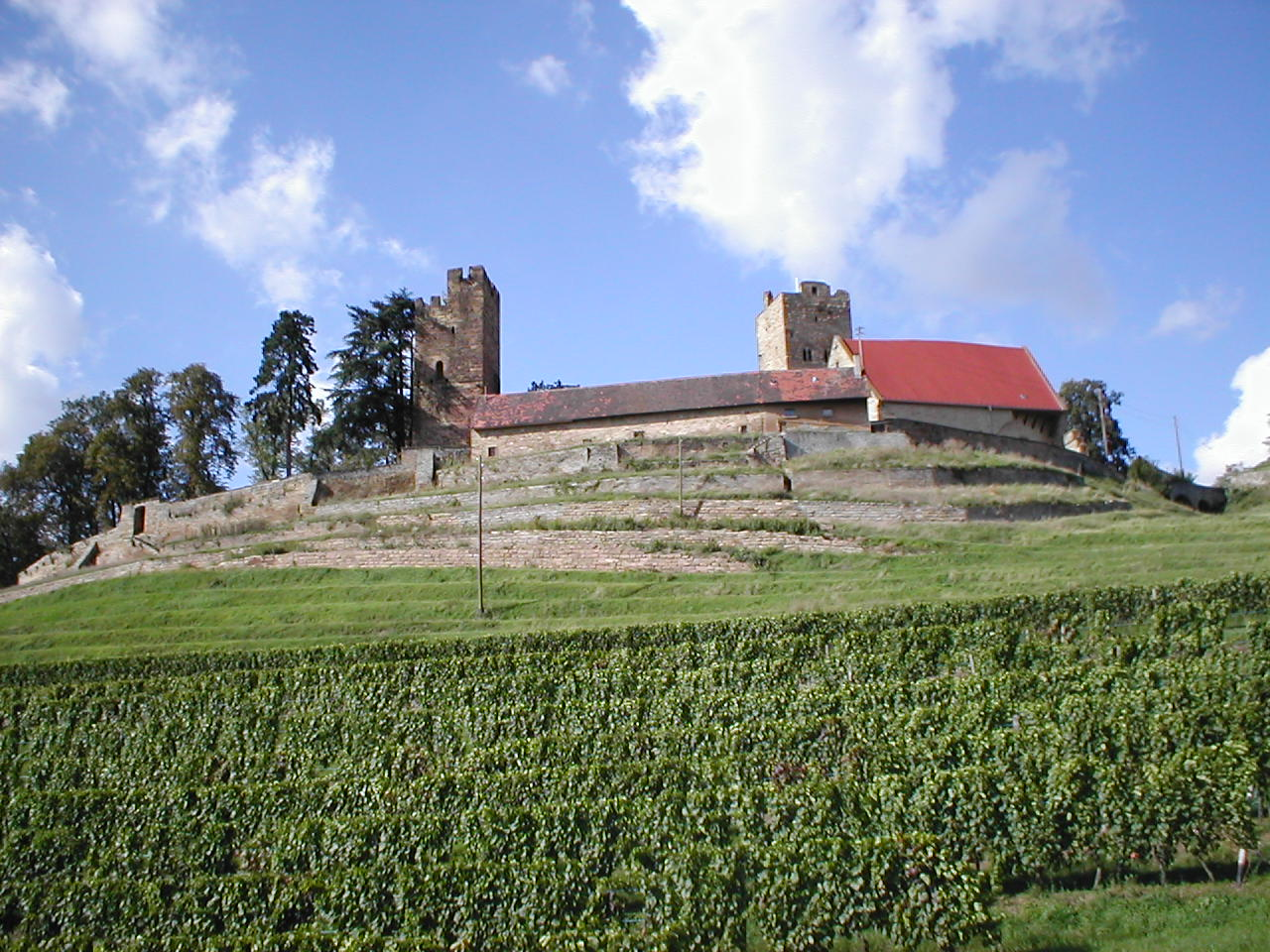
Neipperg Castle, ancestral home of the family since the 12th century

The family first appeared in the 13th century, descending from the noble lords of Schwaigern. The Neipperg family's ancestral seat, which gave them their name, was Neipperg Castle. In the 14th and 15th centuries, the Neipperg family expanded their holdings through fiefdoms in Württemberg, the Palatinate, and Baden in the Zabergäu and Kraichgau regions. In 1431, they were granted the right of high justice, becoming directly subordinate to the emperor. Through skilful political manoeuvring with Württemberg and the Electoral Palatinate, the family successfully defended its influence and possessions, particularly against neighbouring Württemberg, which was developing into a territorial state. In the late 15th century, the family split into the Adelshofen line, which continued in the male line until 1708, and the Schwaigern line, which had its burial place in the town church of Schwaigern. The family implemented the Reformation in its territories and, from the late 16th century onwards, had its seat at Klingenberg Castle before Eberhard Friedrich von Neipperg (1655–1725) built Schwaigern Castle as the new seat.

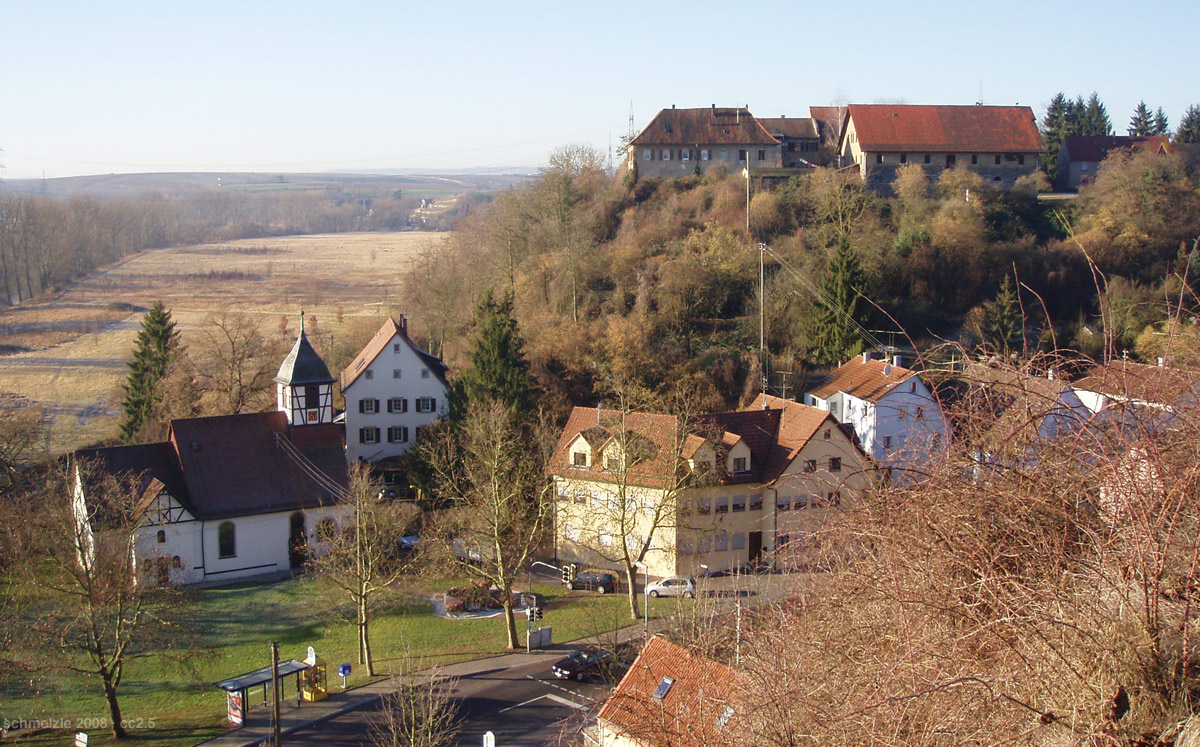
Klingenberg, owned by the family since 1412

Starting with Eberhard Friedrich von Neipperg, several generations of the family served the Habsburgs, where they converted back to Catholicism and attained high offices in the administration of the Habsburg imperial family. Eberhard Friedrich's son, Wilhelm Reinhard von Neipperg (1684–1774), was elevated to the rank of Imperial Count on 5 February 1726. The descendants of the union (morganatic marriage) between his grandson Adam Albert von Neipperg (1775–1829) and Marie-Louise of Austria, widow of French Emperor Napoleon I, formed the collateral branch of the Counts of Montenuovo, who were elevated to the Austrian princely rank in 1864 and continued in the male line until 1951. Most of the Neipperg family pursued military or diplomatic careers, unless they were exclusively concerned with the administration of their estates. The Neippergs' social rise is reflected in their marriages. Until the 17th century, spouses were predominantly from Kraichgau or southwestern German lower nobility families, after which there were numerous connections with spouses from the Württemberg and the House of Habsburg. The current head of the family, Karl-Eugen von Neipperg (born 1951), is married to Andrea von Habsburg, a daughter of Otto von Habsburg. Since the Second World War, the family has devoted itself primarily to winegrowing on its estates in the Zabergäu region and on vineyards acquired in France in the 1970s.

== Origin ==
The origins and family ties of the Neipperg family are shrouded in mystery, dating back to the 11th century, but have been largely confirmed by readily accessible sources in Swabian archives. Historians have traced a connection between the Neipperg family and the Lords of Massenbach, the Lords of Richen, and the Lords of Schwaigern based on the Neipperg-specific personal names Reinbot and Waramund. A Reinbot appears in Schwaigern at the beginning of the 13th century, and in 1241, a Reinbot is mentioned in Neipperg (now a district of Brackenheim). A Waramund also appeared first in Schwaigern and then in Neipperg, suggesting that the family was a collateral line of the noble lords of Schwaigern, who then inherited the main line in the mid-13th century.

The fact that their coat of arms is identical to that of the Lords of Böckingen and the noble knights of Fürfeld suggests that they are related to the Neipperg family.

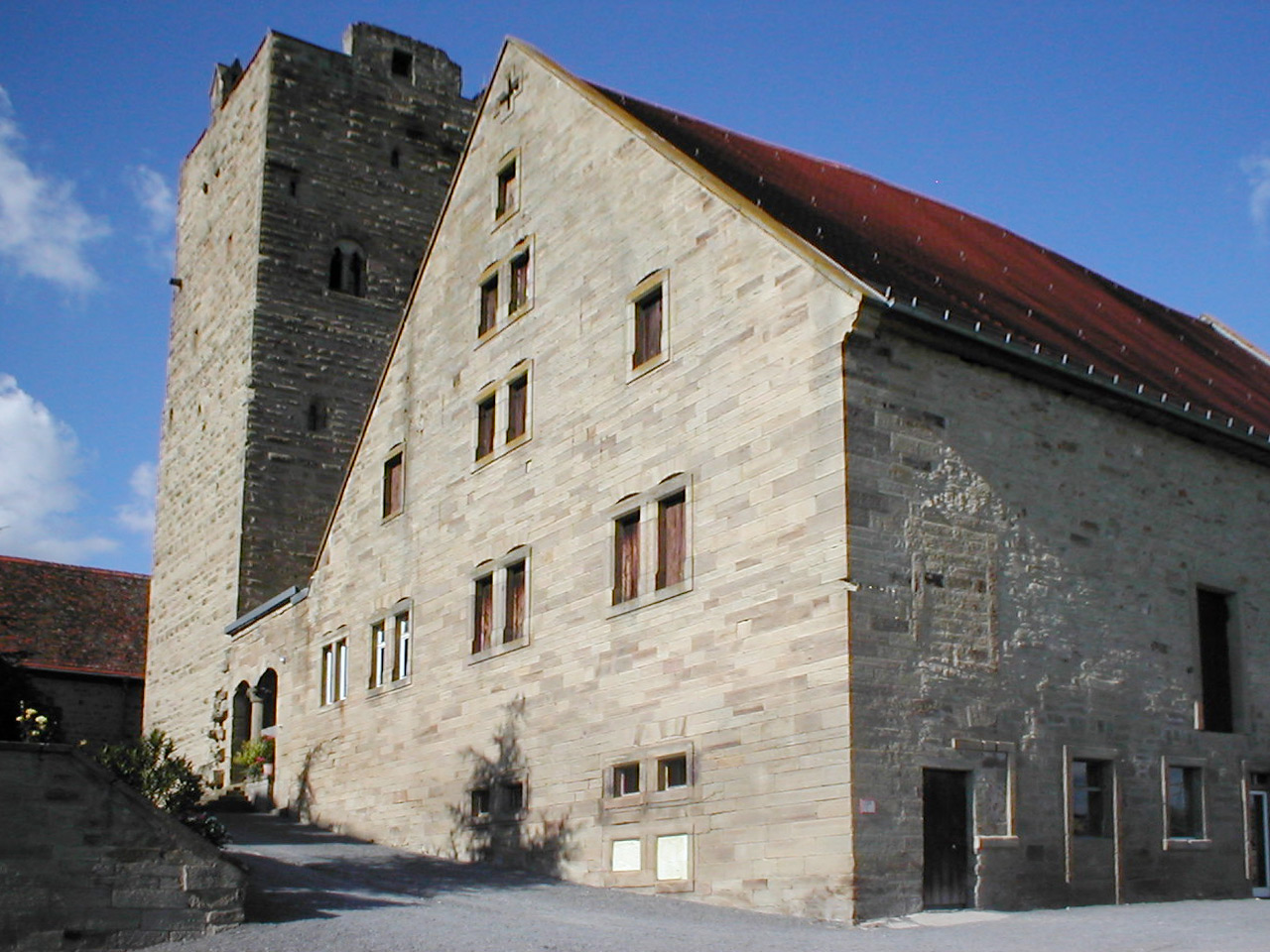
Palas and keep of the Upper Neipperg Castle

In the village of Neipperg, on the Heuchelberg, a southern foothill of the Heuchelberg, stands Neipperg Castle, which was initially designed as a fortified structure and later converted into a stately residence. It is considered the ancestral seat of the Neipperg family, from whom the village takes its name. From the 13th century onwards, the village of Neipperg developed as a hamlet surrounding the castle. The Neipperg family probably owned the castle as early as the 13th century. The oldest documented feudal lords are the brothers Wilhelm and Konrad von Neipperg, who were enfeoffed with the castle and surrounding estates by the Diocese of Würzburg in 1304–1306. In addition to the Neipperg family, other noble families also had possessions and rights to Neipperg Castle. In 1321, Engelhard von Weinsberg sold his share to the Counts of Württemberg, who around 1400 enfeoffed the Lords of Gemmingen with their share. Meiser, who also bore the name, was the owner of part of the castle for a time in the 14th century, which was repurchased in 1364 by Reinhard von Neipperg (died 1377), who also acquired the bailiwick in Schwaigern, previously granted to the lords of Hirschhorn.

== Expansion of rule in the 14th and 15th centuries ==
Reinhard's son, Eberhard I von Neipperg (died 1406), was able to further increase his share of Neipperg Castle and also acquired several fiefdoms in Schwaigern that had previously been granted to various members of the family. While Reinhard was still closely tied to Württemberg as a representative on the council of the Württemberg Count Eberhard the Greiner, Eberhard I of Neipperg had been in the service of the Electorate of the Palatinate since at least 1383 and was the representative of King Ruprecht in 1401.

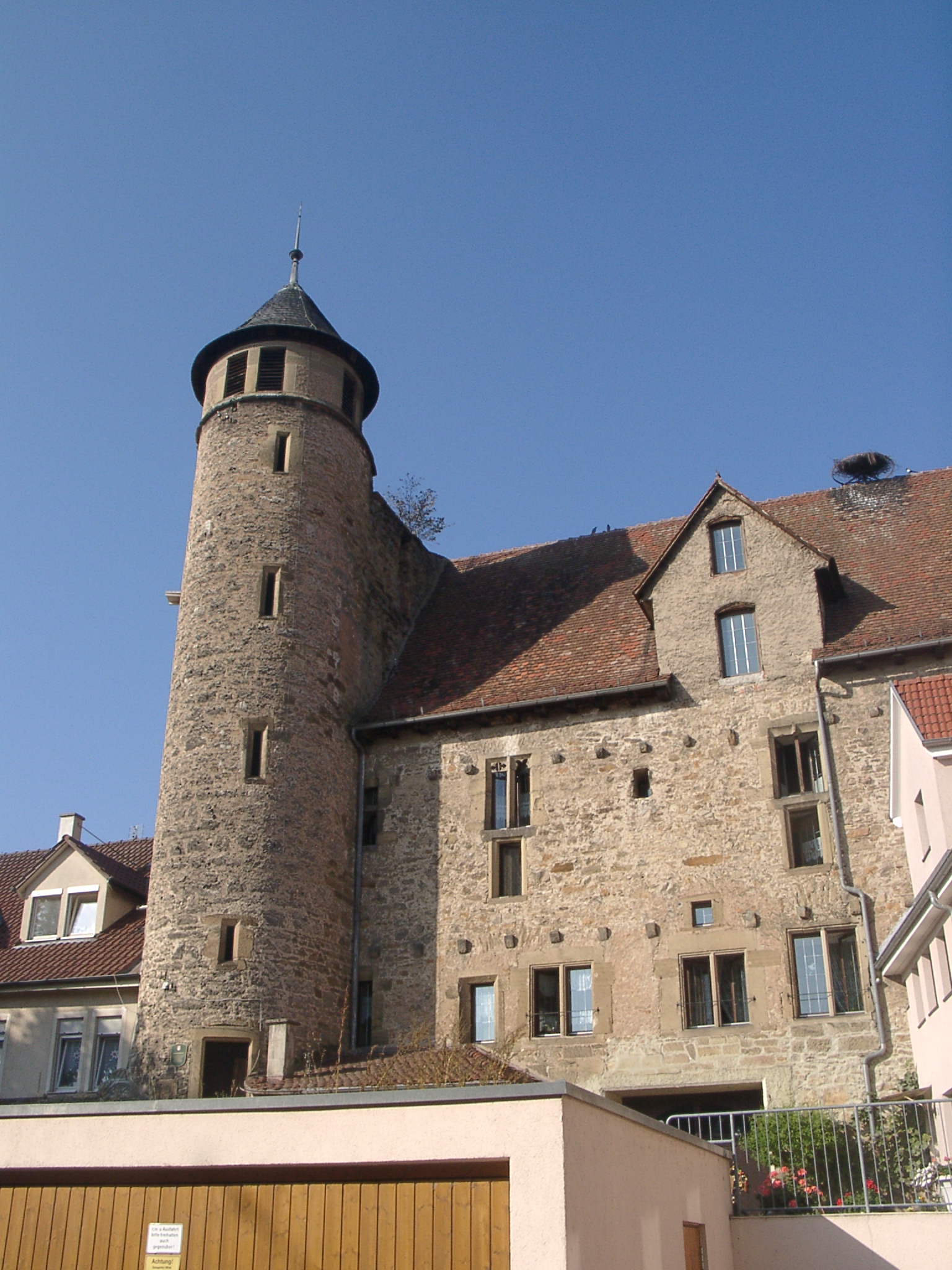
Bönnigheim Castle

The sons and grandsons of Eberhard I von Neipperg received further feudal estates and rights in the 14th and 15th centuries, including half of Bönnigheim Castle in 1391, the castle and village of Klingenberg in 1412, a third of the tithe in Böckingen in 1419, the right of high justice in Schwaigern in 1431, and the village of Adelshofen in 1434. The considerable expansion of the family's holdings during those years was achieved primarily by rendering Eberhard I's son, Eberhard II. Eberhard II and his brother Reinhard II were also able to preserve the family's rights and claims against the rising territorial powers of Baden and Württemberg and against the growing cities. During this period, Schwaigern became one of the family's main residences, and members of the family belonged to the Society of the Donkey.

Eberhard II's son, Diether von Neipperg (died 1465), came under the protection of Count Palatine Friedrich in 1455, together with his uncle Reinhard II von Neipperg (died 1458), with his possessions in Schatthausen, Baiertal, Dielheim, Adelshofen, Massenbachhausen, Schwaigern, Neipperg, and Michelfeld. Reinhard II's sons, Wendel and Engelhard, further expanded relations with the Palatinate, while their brother Hans and two of their cousins sided with Württemberg. Wendel (died 1480) and Engelhard (died 1495) were knighted after the Battle of Seckenheim in 1462, in which they fought alongside Count Palatine Frederick. Engelhard was the castle governor in Heidelberg in 1460, marshal of Palatine Count Friedrich in 1472, and vicedom in Neustadt an der Haardt in 1476. He owned a quarter of the town of Bönnigheim, shares in Neipperg and Schwaigern, the entire village of Adelshofen, and a large number of other rights and properties. In 1478, he was involved in re-establishing the Society of the Donkey, which had been temporarily inactive under Frederick I, Palatine of the Rhine.

Because it was directly adjacent to Württemberg territory and because members of the Neipperg family, which at that time was largely subordinate to the Electoral Palatinate, also held fiefdoms in Württemberg, relations with the large neighbour were constantly tense. The Württemberg Landgraben, built by the Württembergers from 1473 onwards, divided the Neipperg territory.

After Engelhard von Neipperg died without children, his property passed to two sons of his cousin Diether: Eberhard IV and Wilhelm, who thus united the entire family estate, divided the inheritance in 1497, and founded the Adelshofen and Schwaigern lines.

== Adelshofen line ==
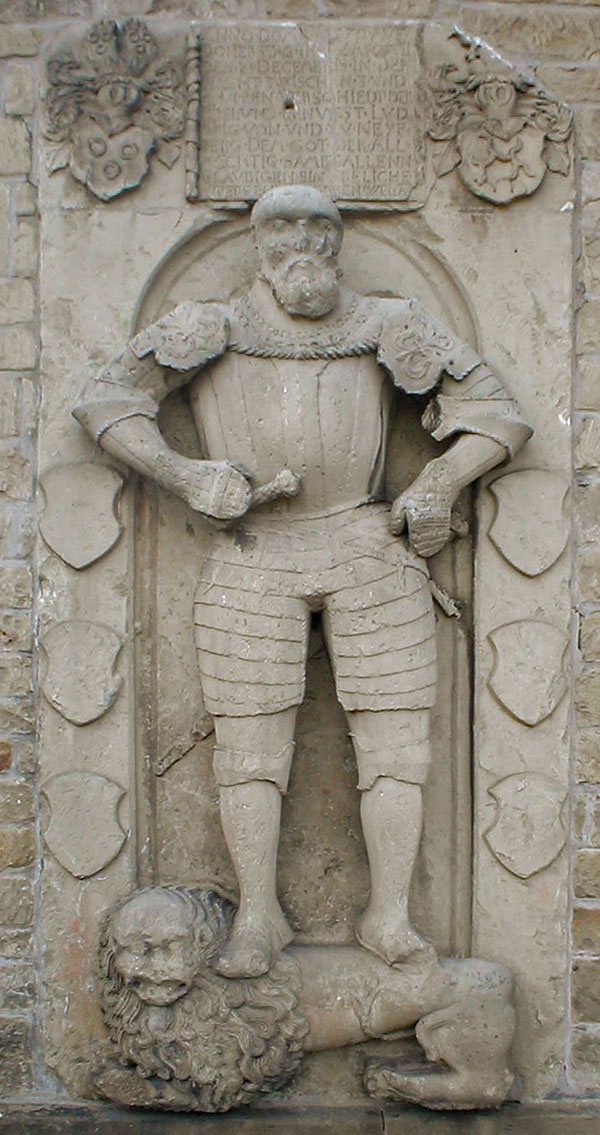
Epitaph of Ludwig von Neipperg (died 1570) in Adelshofen

Eberhard IV von Neipperg (died 1506) was loyal to Württemberg. After his death, his sons Eberhard V (died 1534) and Diether (died 1541) achieved a renewed division of the inheritance with their cousin Georg Wilhelm (died 1520), so that the Adelshofen line owned the entire town of Adelshofen, which gave it its name, and half of Schwaigern. Although Eberhard V and Diether had fiefdoms in both Württemberg and Baden, they remained loyal to Württemberg. Diether's descendants were mainly active in Schwaigern. Georg (died 1557) was the parish priest in Schwaigern and later canon in Worms. Eberhard V's son, Ludwig von Neipperg (died 25 December 1570), introduced the Reformation in his territories in 1531. His image is preserved on an ornate tomb slab in Adelshofen, as is that of his granddaughter Anna Maria (died 5 December 1571), who died in childhood. Ludwig's cousins Hartmann (died 1571) and Hans (died 1591) ran the family business in Schwaigern together with their cousins from the Schwaigern line. After the death of Hans' sons in 1595–1602, their property passed to Ludwig's sons in Adelshofen: Reinhard (died around 1612) and Georg Wilhelm (died around 1606). Although the Adelshofen line had no significant external influence and was mainly concerned with the administration of its property, Georg Wilhelm's grandson Philipp Ludwig (died 1685) was elected director of the Kraichgau Knightly Canton in 1659. He and his children had close ties to the Württemberg court. With the violent death of his son Bernhard von Neipperg, the Adelshofen line died out in the male line in 1708. The manor house in Adelshofen had been destroyed in 1690. Although the main line of the Schwaigern family had a new moated castle built in Adelshofen in 1716, the complex was hardly used and quickly fell into disrepair, so that nothing remains of it today.

== Schwaigern line ==
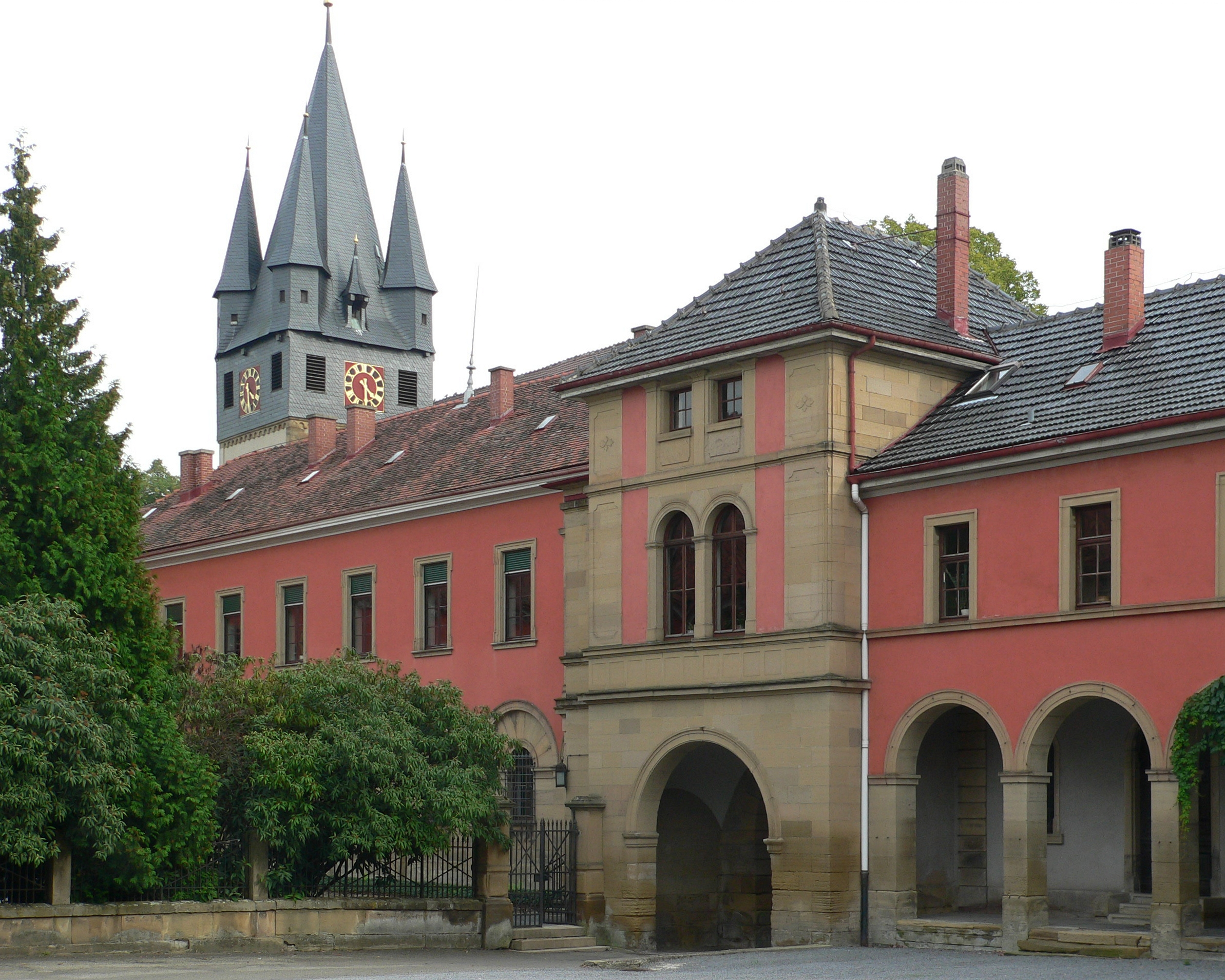
Schwaigern Castle, seat of the Neipperg family since 1702

Wilhelm von Neipperg (died 1498) was court master to the Margrave of Baden in 1452, took part in the Battle of Seckenheim on the side of Württemberg-Baden in 1462, and then returned to his position as court master at the court of Baden, later also at the court of Württemberg. His son Georg Wilhelm (died 1520) was Burgrave of Starkenburg in 1503, initially in the service of Count Palatine Philipp, but after the latter's defeat in the Bavarian-Palatinate War of Succession in 1504, he returned to Württemberg, where he was Württemberg's chief bailiff in the Zabergäu and a confidant of Duke Ulrich. From 1514 onwards, Georg Wilhelm had the town church in Schwaigern significantly enlarged. The church near the castle in Schwaigern was the traditional burial place of the Neipperg family, and around 30 historic tombs of the family have been preserved there to this day. The first impulses for the Reformation in Schwaigern probably came from Georg Wilhelm's son Wolf (died 1533). Wolf's brother Ludwig (died 1536) was burgrave in Alzey in 1532, received the castle fief in Oppenheim in 1533, and subsequently became court marshal of the Electoral Palatinate.

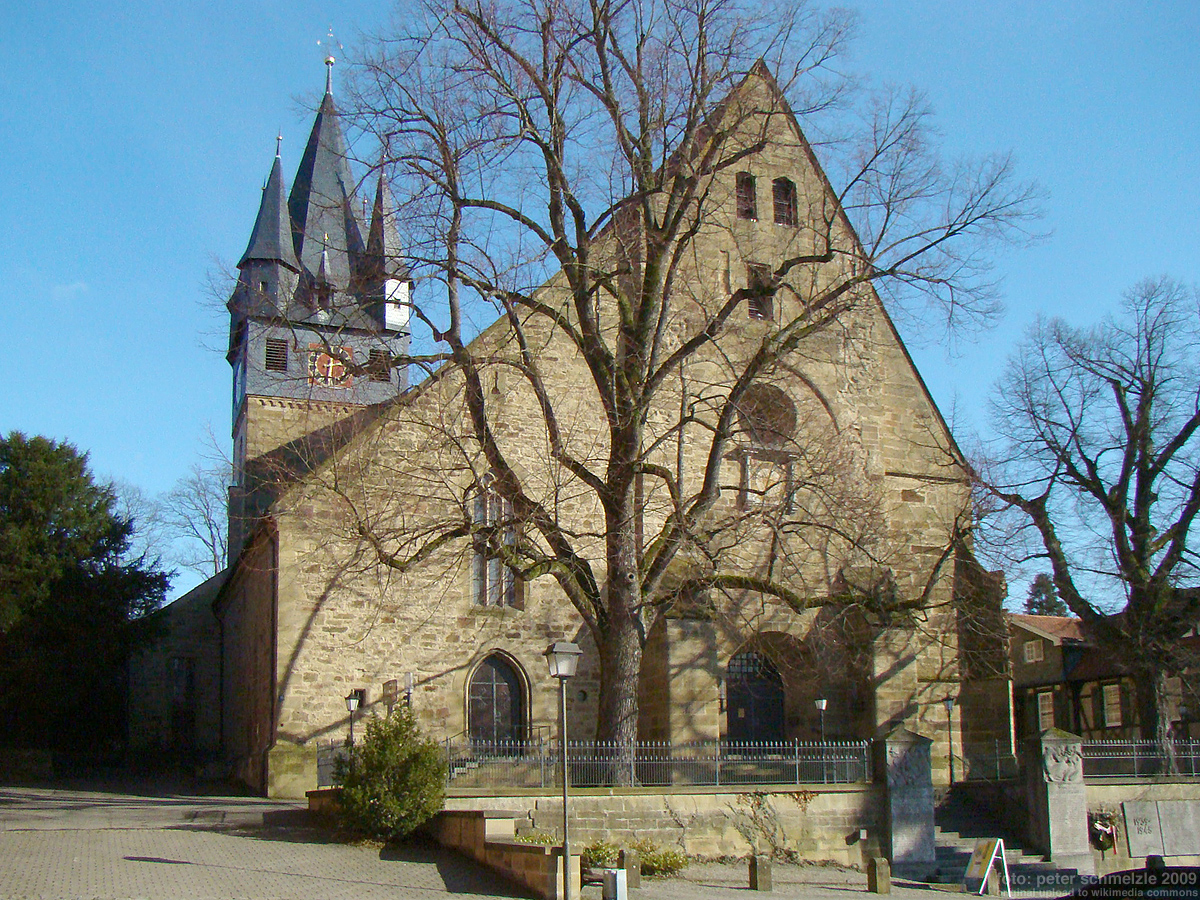
Schwaigern Town Church, burial place of the Neipperg family

Ludwig's son Philipp I (died 1581) secured the continuation of the Reformation in Schwaigern in 1550 through a settlement with Georg (died 1557), a canon of Worms Cathedral from the Adelshofen line. Like generations of ancestors before him, Philipp I was dependent on several lords through fiefdoms in Württemberg, Baden, and the Palatinate, against whom he successfully defended himself in various disputes. In 1554, he took up residence in Klingenberg, where he had the destroyed Klingenberg Castle rebuilt in 1577. Like his father, he was Palatine Burgrave in Alzey and later also court master to the Bishop of Speyer.

Under Philipp I's sons Engelhard and Philipp II, the Schwaigern line briefly branched off. Engelhard (died 1600) received Streichenberg Castle, shares in Neipperg with Stebbach, and Massenbachhausen. Engelhard took up residence in Streichenberg, but the castle was ceded to the Electoral Palatinate before 1600. His sons, who were still minors at the time of his death, initially continued the collateral line but died childless before 1649.

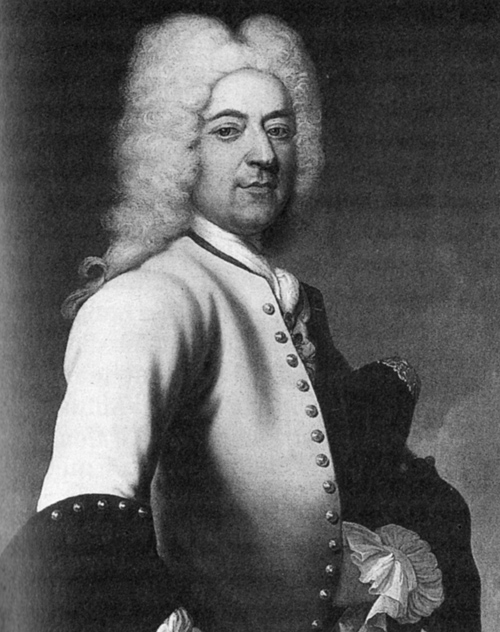
Wilhelm Reinhard von Neipperg (1684–1774) was elevated to the rank of Imperial Count in 1726.

Philipp II (died 1595) belonged to the main line of the Schwaigern family. He no longer served in the sovereign's service but administered his own dominion exclusively, which intensified conflicts with Württemberg. His sons Ludwig Christoph (died 1635) and Bernhard (died 1622) were still young when he died and remained under guardianship until 1615. The guardians were able to acquire property from other family lines and branches to provide for the siblings, as the property of the main line had already been greatly reduced by the division of the inheritance. The acquisition of property was made from the family's assets to preserve their total holdings and counteract the strong fragmentation into partial ownership. Ludwig Christoph continued the family line and presumably also refrained from serving foreign sovereigns.

Ludwig Christoph's sons Bernhard Ludwig (1619–1672), Eberhard Wilhelm (1624–1672), and Friedrich Dietrich (1626–1680) were still minors when their father died during the Thirty Years' War. During the war, fiefdoms had also been confiscated, and other properties were lost. It was only after the Peace of Westphalia in 1648, which restored the pre-war ownership structure, that the family's economic foundation was secured once again. In 1652, the three brothers divided their father's estate. Each of the brothers founded his own family line. Bernhard Ludwig received the Klingenberg estates, but when he died in 1672, he had only two female descendants. Eberhard Wilhelm continued the line and is thus the progenitor of the present line, but he also died in 1672, so that initially the third brother, Friedrich Dietrich, was head of the family until his own death in 1680. Through his proximity to the Württemberg court, he acquired new fiefdoms and rights, but his own family line died out in 1690 with his son Johann Philipp Adam.

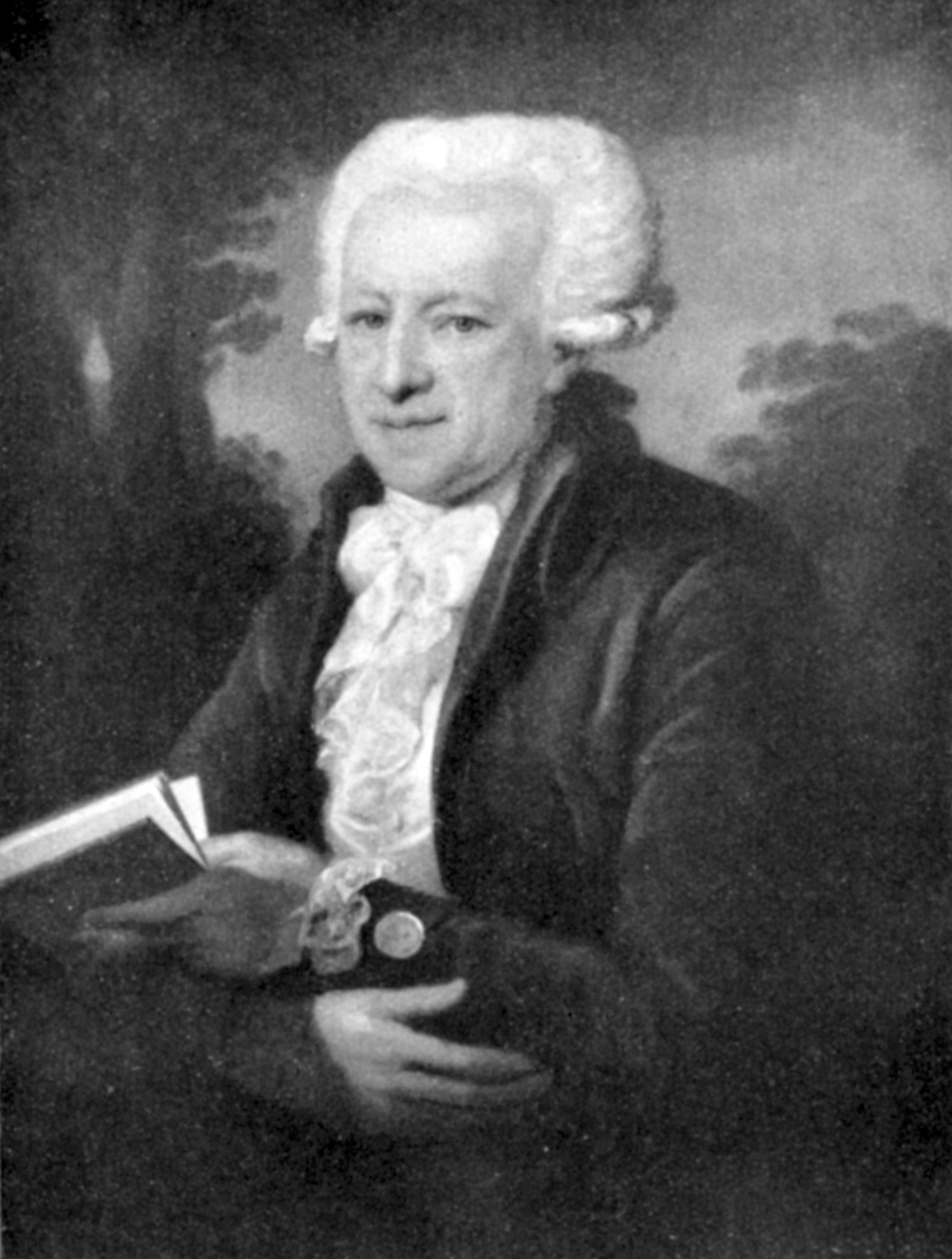
Leopold von Neipperg (1728–1792)

Eberhard Wilhelm's son, Eberhard Friedrich von Neipperg (1655–1725), was elevated to the rank of Imperial Baron in 1672, became Chief Bailiff of Blaubeuren in 1689, was Imperial Army Commander against the French advancing from Heidelberg to Heilbronn in 1693, later fought against the rebellious Hungarians, and became Fortress Commander of Philippsburg in 1710. He also served the Habsburg dynasty and became Habsburg Field Marshal in 1717. From 1707, he was the director of the Kraichgau Knightly Canton. Under his rule, the ancestral seat of the von Neipperg family was moved in 1702 to Schwaigern Castle, which he had built, where he also acquired extensive land holdings between 1699 and 1719.

Eberhard Friedrich's son Wilhelm Reinhard von Neipperg (1684–1774) was tutor and confidant to the future Emperor Francis I and was elevated to the rank of Imperial Count by Emperor Charles VI on 5 February 1726. With Wilhelm Reinhard and due to his service to Austria, the family presumably converted back to Catholicism in 1717. He became governor of Luxembourg and the county of Chiny in 1730 and earned high military honours. As imperial commissioner, he concluded the Peace of Belgrade in 1739, for whose terms, which were disadvantageous to Austria, he was briefly sentenced to imprisonment in a fortress. After his rehabilitation, he continued his military career and became Field Marshal in 1741, Knight of the Order of the Golden Fleece in 1753, Vice-President of the Court Council in 1755, and Commander of Vienna in 1762. He and his descendants were granted a seat and vote in the Swabian Counts' College in 1766. As the centre of his activities was in Vienna, he acquired a prestigious palace there near the Schottenkirche. His daughter Maria Wilhelmina became the mistress of Emperor Franz I.

Wilhelm Reinhard's son Leopold (1728–1792) was chamberlain and imperial court councillor in Vienna. He was on diplomatic missions to various European courts, and this costly activity led to a prolonged financial crisis for the Neipperg family from the 1760s onwards, which almost resulted in receivership in 1782. Leopold's three sons, Joseph, Carl Vinzenz Hieronymus Count von Neipperg (1757–1835), imperial chamberlain, Grand Prior of the Sovereign Maltese Order, Prelate of Bohemia, and Lord of the Grand Priory of Strakonice, Warwaschau, and Oberliebich, and Adam Albert, concluded a family agreement in 1798, which regulated the repayment of debts during the 19th century.

== 19th century and Princes of Montenuovo ==
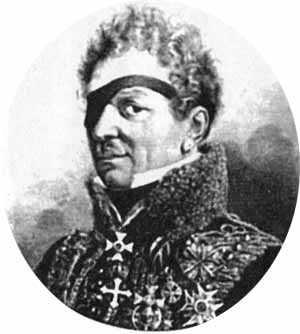
Count Adam Albert von Neipperg, second husband of Archduchess Marie Louise, Duchess of Parma

Coat of arms of the Princes of Montenuovo, descendants of Count Adam Albert and Marie Louise, 1864

In 1806, the county of Schwaigern was abolished, and large parts of it became part of Württemberg as a result of mediatization. In 1815, the von Neipperg family was placed under the sovereignty of the Kingdom of Württemberg. A declaration from 1819 states: "The Counts of Neipperg retain their equal status, as they have held it until now, and are counted among the high nobility." A decree issued in 1829 proclaimed that the head of the family was entitled to the title of "Erlaucht" (Illustrious). The Counts of Neipperg continued to be patrons of the Catholic Church, for example, in Massenbachhausen, where the family crypt is located.

The military and subsequent political changes of the early 19th century reduced the Neipperg family's importance in their ancestral lands in southwestern Germany. However, they expanded their social standing in the service of the Austro-Hungarian monarchy through Erwin von Neipperg (1813–1897), an Austrian general of the infantry, and Adam Albert von Neipperg (1775–1829). In 1815, Adam Albert represented the interests of Marie Louise of Austria, wife of the French Emperor Napoleon I, at the Congress of Vienna. Bonaparte, who owned the Grand Duchy of Parma, married him in a morganatic marriage in 1821 after the death of Adam Albert's first wife, Theresa Countess Pola di Treviso, and the fall of Napoleon. Adam Albert von Neipperg also became a citizen of the town of Sargans in Switzerland in 1822; his descendants still hold this citizenship today. Alfred von Neipperg, the eldest son of Adam Albert von Neipperg's first marriage, married Countess Josefina Grisoni in his first marriage and Princess Maria von Württemberg in his second, continuing the Neipperg family line. His father's descendants from his marriage to Marie-Louise of Austria, two daughters and his son Wilhelm Albrecht von Montenuovo (1819 or 1821–1895), were elevated to the Austrian princely rank of Princes of Montenuovo by their grandfather Emperor Franz Joseph in 1864; the name is a translation of Neuberg into Italian. Wilhelm Albrecht von Montenuovo and his son Alfred von Montenuovo (1854–1927) remained in the service of the Austro-Hungarian monarchy until its end in 1918 at the end of the First World War. They were officers in the army and served in the imperial court. Their branch died out in the male line in 1951.

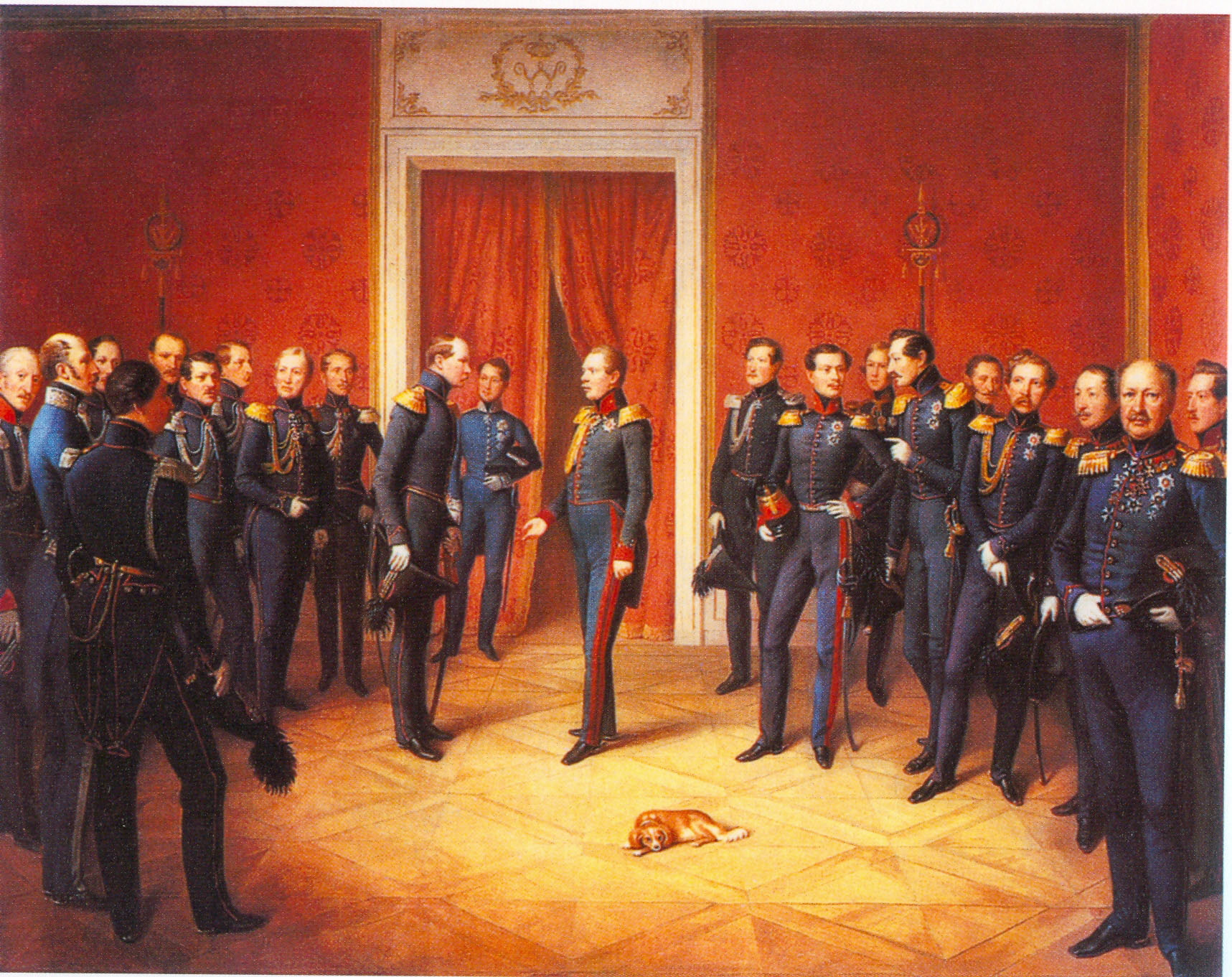
Alfred von Neipperg (fourth from right) reporting to King William I of Württemberg, painting from 1847

In 1831, the King of Württemberg, Wilhelm I, granted the heir to the main line, Adam Albert's eldest son Alfred von Neipperg (1807–1865), together with his brothers, the village of Schwaigern with appurtenances, Neipperg Castle, hunting grounds in Kleingartach, Bönnigheim, and Erligheim, as well as estates in Schwaigern and Wald near Neipperg. In 1833, he and his brothers concluded a family agreement on succession, which awarded the entire estate to the firstborn son. Alfred and his three younger brothers, Ferdinand (1809–1843), Gustav (1811–1850), and Erwin von Neipperg (1813–1897), all served in the Austrian army. Erwin, in particular, earned high military honours and, after 1850, took over the family business from his brother Alfred, who had fallen ill and married Princess Marie of Württemberg in 1840. As Alfred remained childless, Erwin and his son Reinhard (1856–1919) continued the family line. Reinhard had only a relatively short military career, serving as a member of the Reichstag from 1881 to 1890, and was responsible for significant renovations to the castle and treasury in Schwaigern around 1900.

== The Counts of Neipperg in the 20th and 21st centuries ==
Reinhard's eldest son, Eberhard (1882–1956), renounced his claim to the family line for health reasons and devoted himself to cultural pursuits. His younger brother, Anton Ernst (1883–1947), therefore entered the family line. Another brother, Karl (1890–1948), took up a spiritual career as Adalbert von Neipperg and became the first abbot of the Neuburg Monastery near Heidelberg after its re-establishment.

Anton Ernst von Neipperg initially served in the Prussian army, reaching the rank of cavalry captain in the First World War before leaving military service to devote himself to managing the family estates, which faced difficulties during the economic hardship of the 1920s and 1930s. He was president of a German Catholic Congress in the early 1930s and a member of the Centre Party in the Württemberg state parliament until it was dissolved. His eldest son, Karl Reinhard, was killed in Russia in 1941, leaving his second son, Joseph Hubert, to inherit the family estate.

Joseph Hubert von Neipperg (born 22 July 1918; died 12 September 2020) was an officer in the Afrika Korps during the Second World War. Shortly after inheriting his estate in 1947, he lost 173 hectares of farmland, around half of his property, as a result of land reform. He held numerous positions in business and society, serving for many years on the supervisory board of Südwestbank and as chairman of the Arbeitsgemeinschaft Deutscher Grundbesitzerverbände (Working Group of German Landowners' Associations) and the Gesellschaft für Agrargeschichte (Society for Agricultural History). He also devoted himself intensively to the management of his estates, particularly viticulture.

The family, which was already exporting wines to Vienna in the 18th century, is said to have introduced Lemberger to Austria. Several historic vineyards were developed by the Neipperg family, such as the Schwaigerner Grafenberg on the Heuchelberg and the Am Hasenbusch vineyard, planted by Philipp von Neipperg in 1575. Today, the Counts of Neipperg own vineyards in Schwaigern, Klingenberg, and Neipperg in the Württemberg wine-growing region. The estate's nearly 30 hectares of vineyards are dominated by the Lemberger grape variety, which accounts for 26 per cent of the total area, followed by Riesling with 20 percent. In 1971, Joseph Hubert von Neipperg also acquired the French vineyards Château Canon-La Gaffelière (20 hectares), Clos de l'Oratoire (10.5 hectares), Château Peyraud (14.5 hectares), and Château La Mondotte (4.5 hectares) in Saint-Émilion, which have been managed by his son Stephan-Christoph von Neipperg (born 1957) since 1984. Together with other winegrowers, Stephan-Christoph also took over the Château Guiraud winery in 2006.

Joseph Hubert's eldest son, Karl-Eugen Erbgraf von Neipperg (born 20 October 1951 in Schwaigern), has taken over the management of the estate in and around Schwaigern. He is a member of the district council of the district of Heilbronn and husband of Andrea Habsburg-Lothringen (born 30 May 1953 in Würzburg), the eldest daughter of Otto von Habsburg.

== Personalities ==
Margaretha von Neipperg (died after 1589), Benedictine nun, last abbess of the Seebach Convent near Bad Dürkheim.

Wilhelm Reinhard von Neipperg (1684–1774), Imperial Field Marshal

Leopold Johann Nepomuk von Neipperg (1728–1792), k.k. Diplomat

Maria Wilhelmina von Neipperg (1738–1775), mistress of Emperor Franz I Stephan.

Adam Albert von Neipperg (1775–1829), Austrian general and statesman

Erwin von Neipperg (1813–1897), Austrian cavalry general

Reinhard von Neipperg (1856–1919), member of the German Reichstag

Anton Ernst von Neipperg (1883–1947), politician

Michaela von Neipperg (1885–1957), Benedictine nun

Adalbert von Neipperg (1890–1948), Benedictine monk, first abbot of Neuburg Abbey.

== Coat of arms ==
The family coat of arms shows three silver rings on a red background. On the helmet with red and silver covers is a closed eagle in flight, as depicted on the shield.

1726: Three silver rings in red, two and one, placed above a crowned helmet resting on a red closed double wing facing right, above a count's crown. Helmet covers red and silver.

=== Historical coats of arms ===
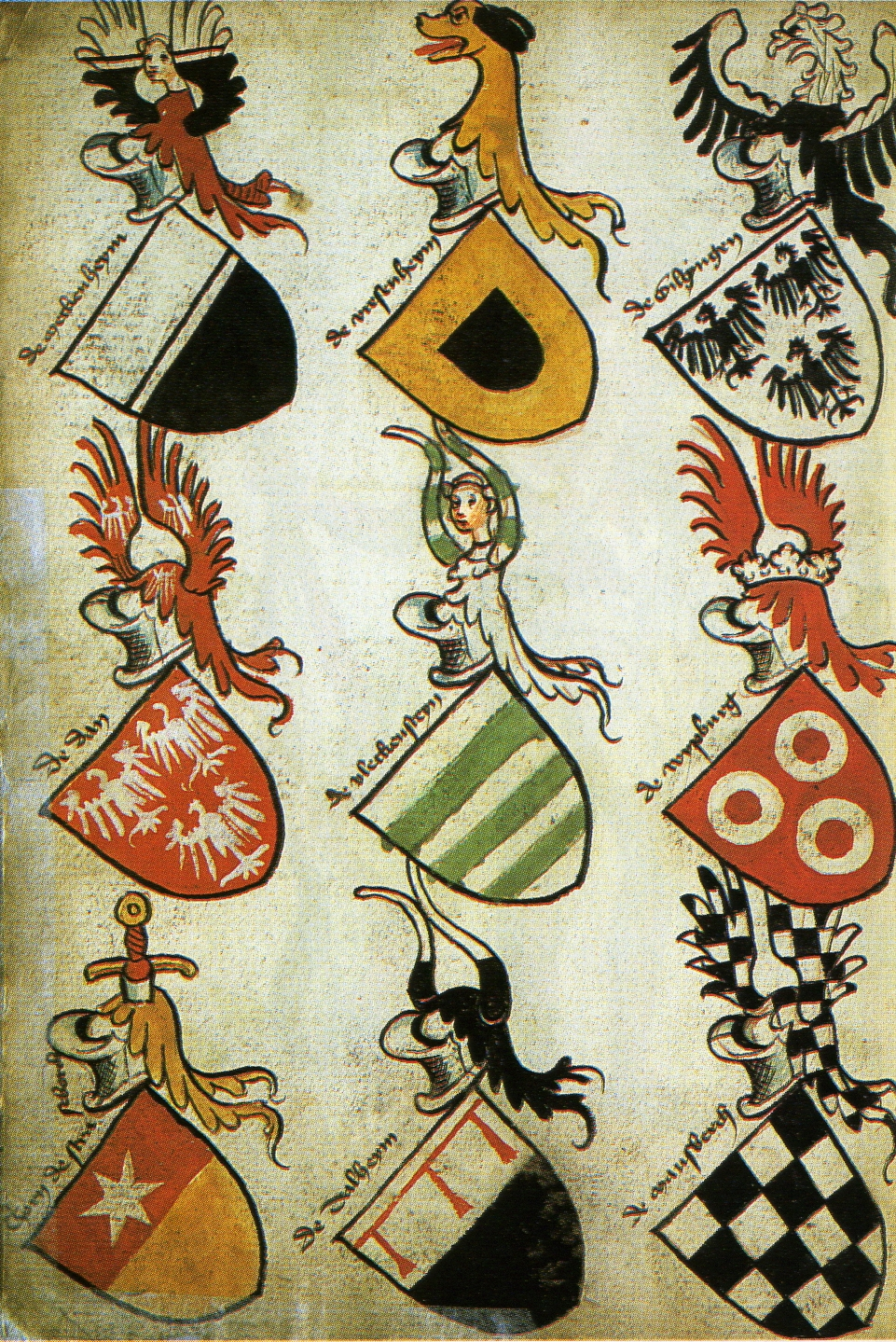
Neipperg coat of arms on the Hyghalmen scroll from the 15th century

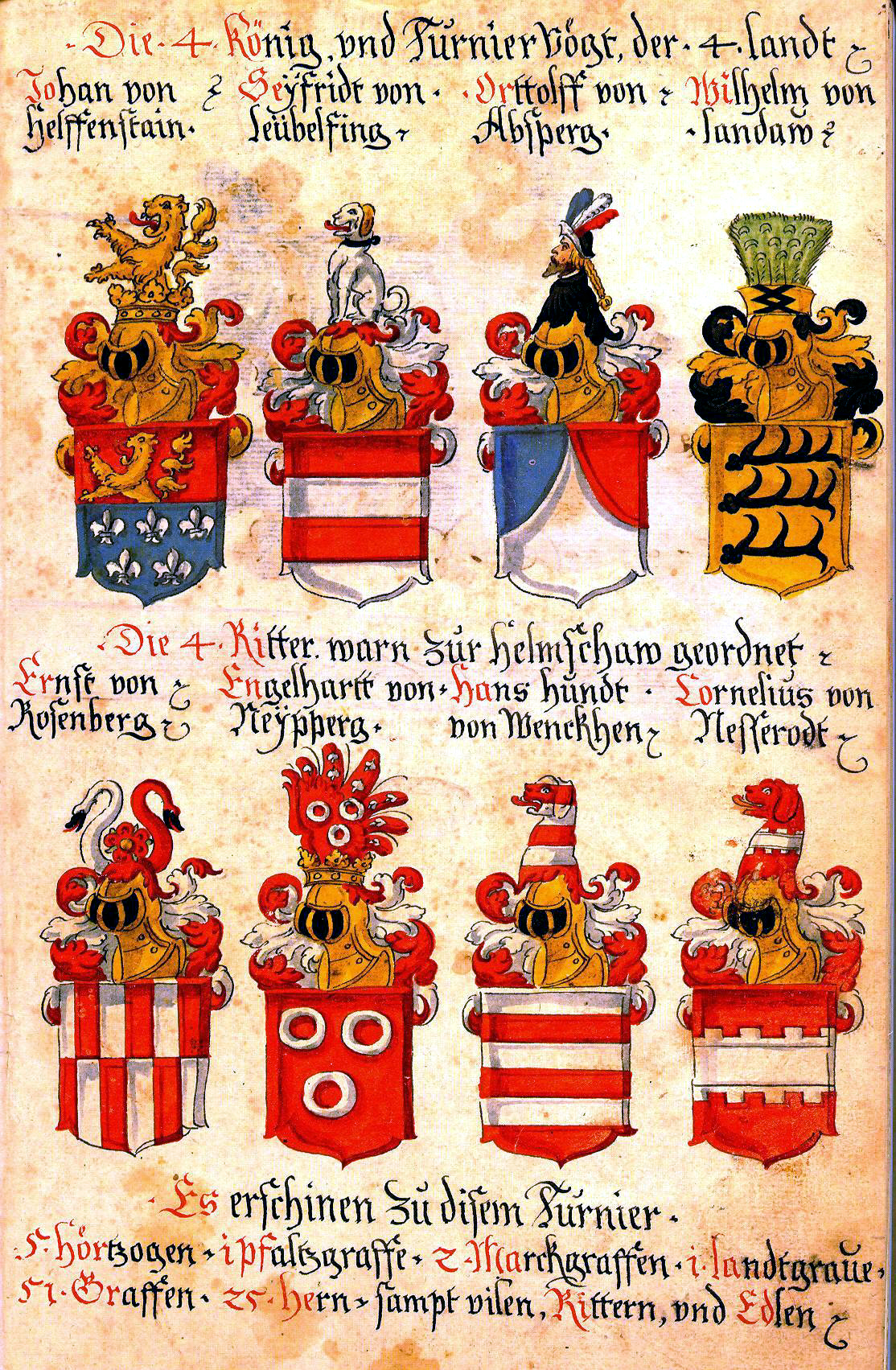
Page from the Codex Rossianus 711 from 1610

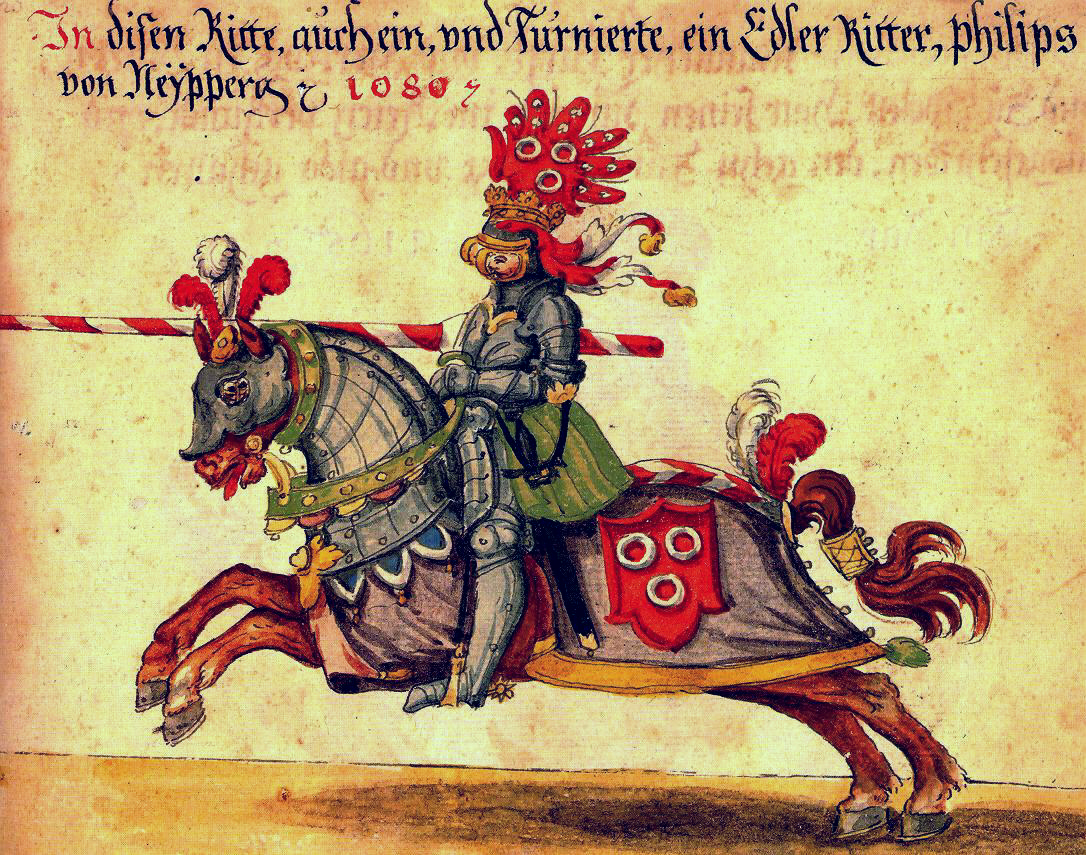
Page from the Codex Rossianus 711

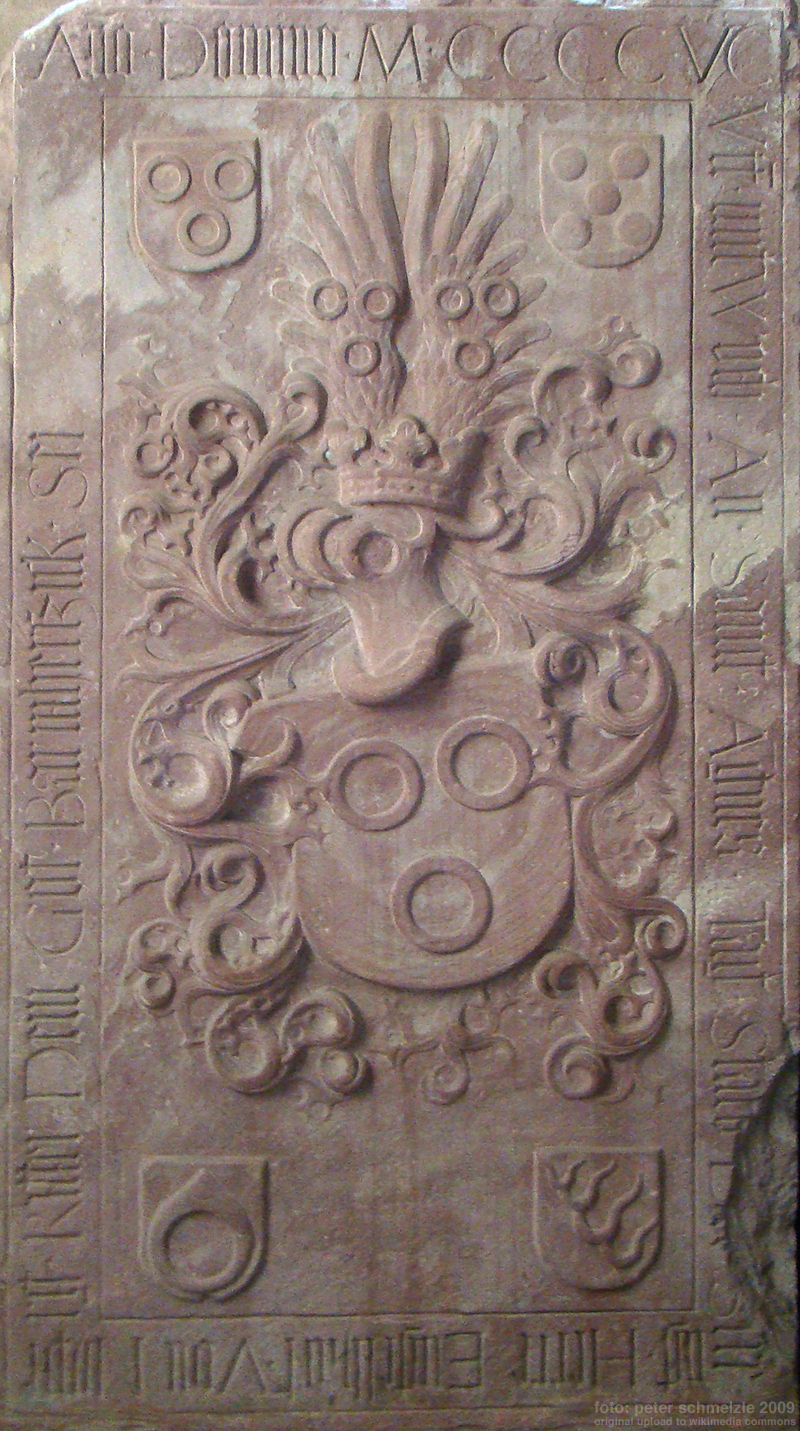
Tombstone of Engelhard von Neipperg († 1495) in the town church of Schwaigern

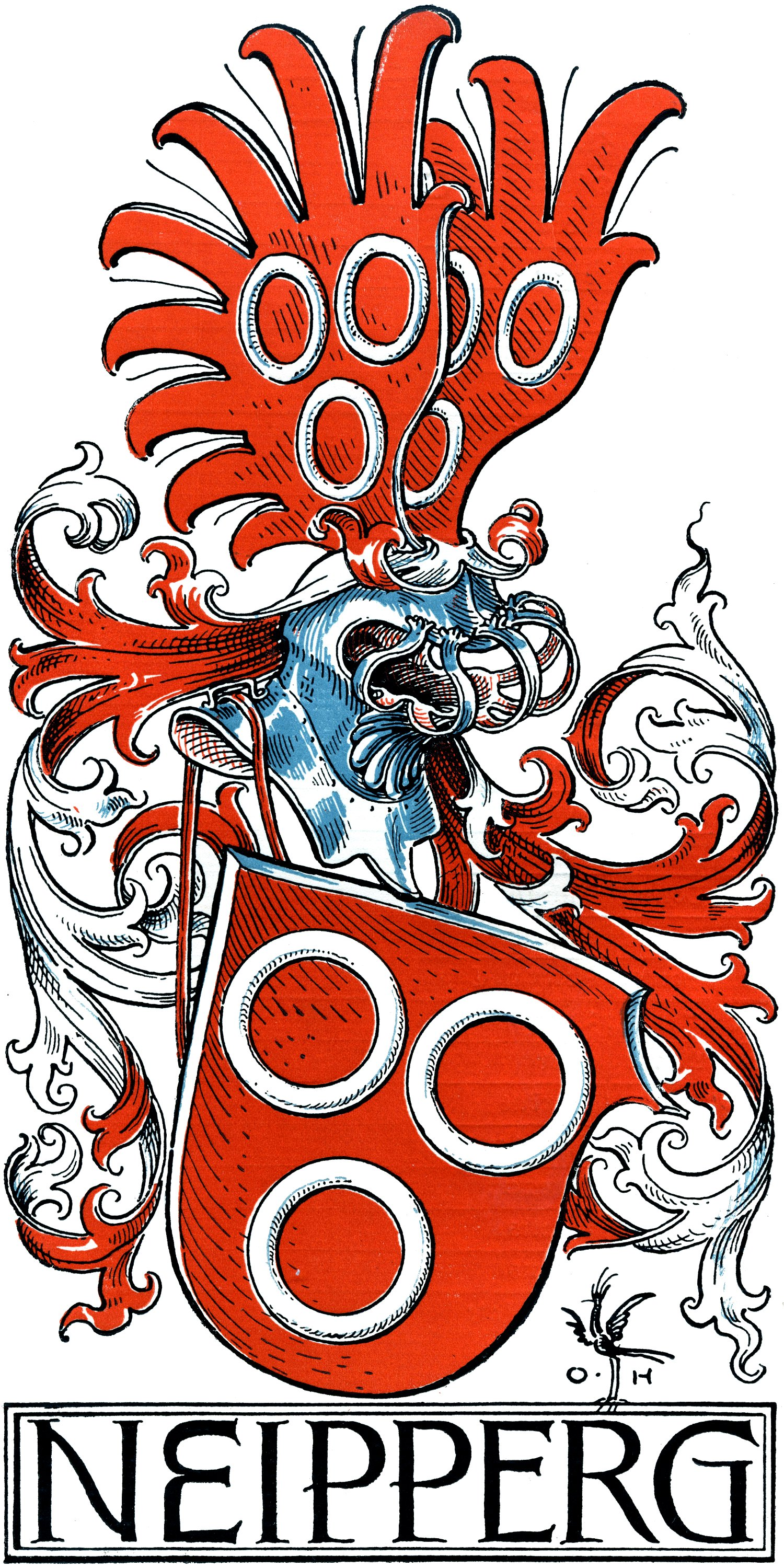
Coat of arms illustration by Otto Hupp in the Munich Calendar of 1899

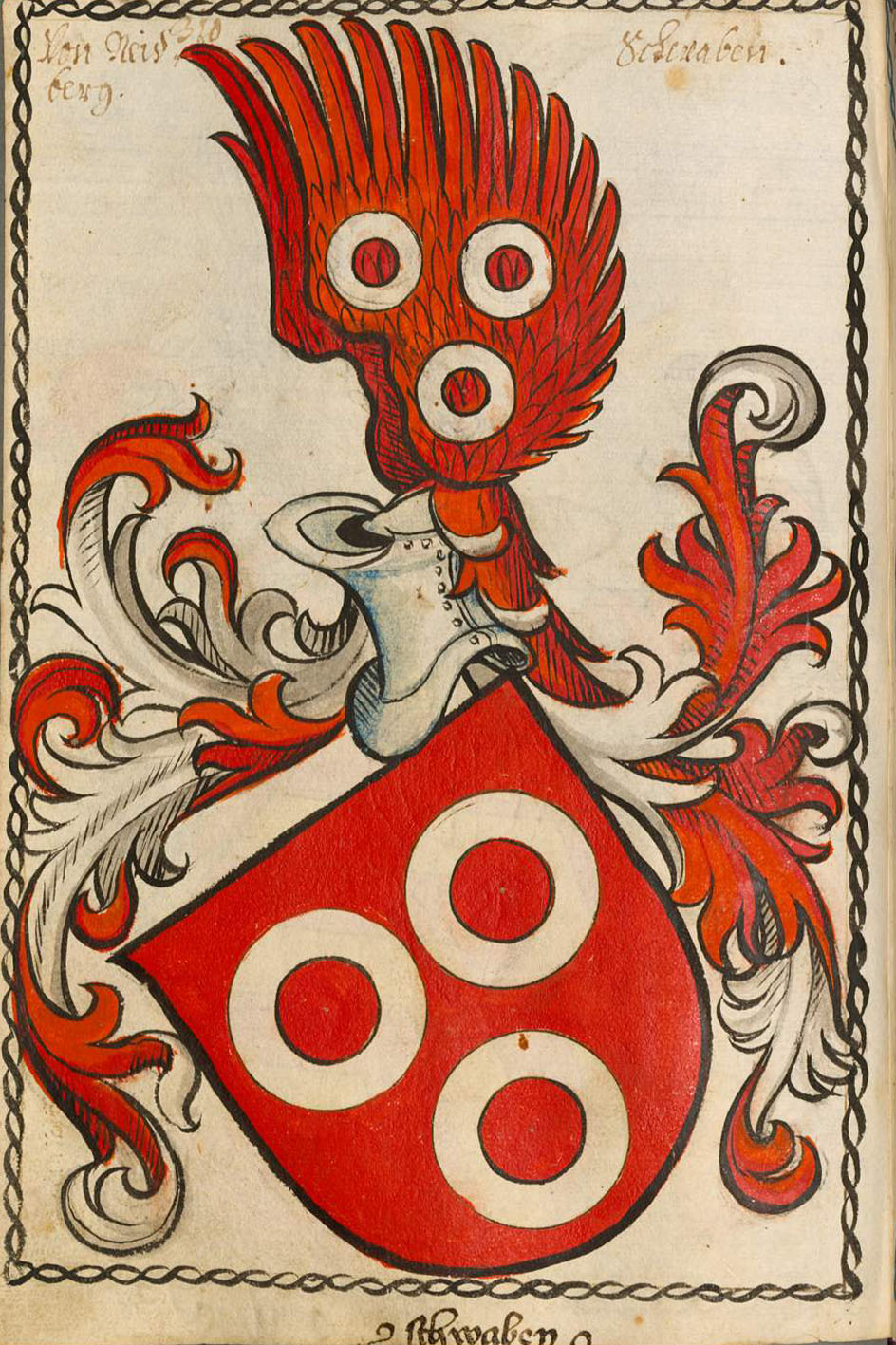
Coat of arms of Neipperg from Scheibler's coat of arms book

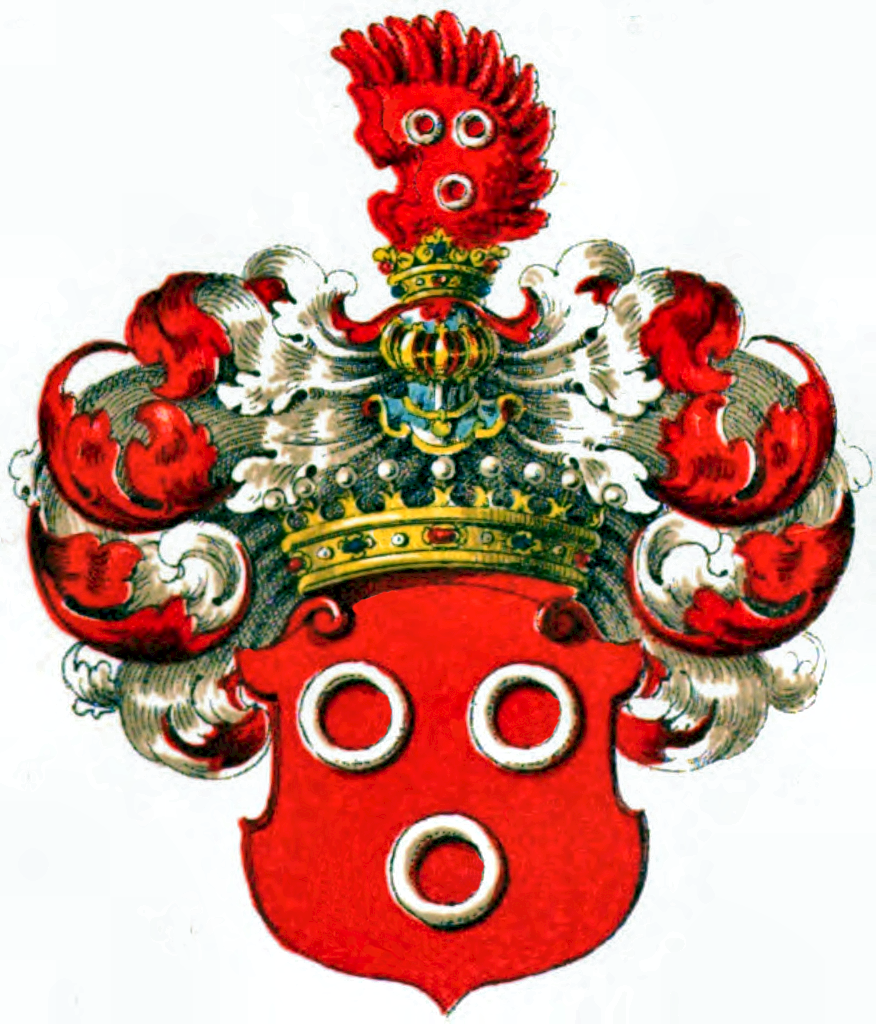
Coat of arms of the Counts of Neipperg, 1726
