= Alfred, 2nd Prince of Montenuovo =

Alfred
- Prince of Montenuovo
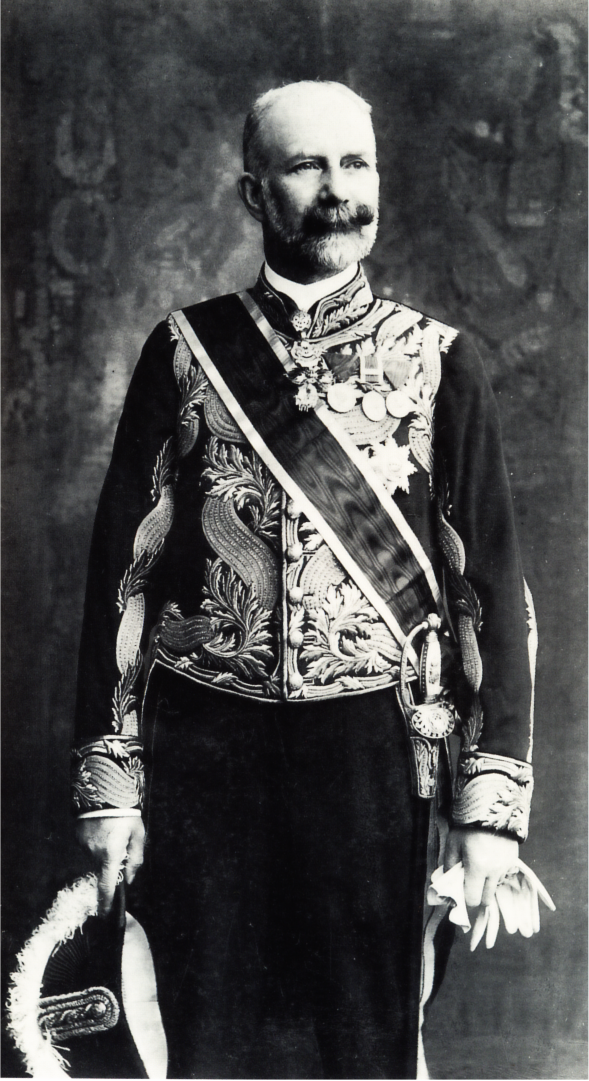
- Alfred in 1902
- Born: 16 September 1854; Vienna, Austrian Empire
- Died: 6 September 1927 (aged 72); Vienna, Republic of Austria
- Spouse: Countess Franziska Maria Stephania Kinsky of Wchinitz and Tettau (m. 1879)
- Issue: Juliana, Princess of Oettingen-Wallerstein; Marie Felizia, Countess Franz of Ledebur-Wicheln; Ferdinand Bonaventura, 3rd Prince of Montenuovo; Franziska, Princess of Lobkowicz
Names
- Alfred Adam Wilhelm Johann Maria
- House: Montenuovo
- Father: William Albert, 1st Prince of Montenuovo
- Mother: Countess Juliana von Batthyány-Strattmann

Alfred, 2nd Prince of Montenuovo (16 September 1854 – 6 September 1927) was one of the highest court officials of Emperor Franz Joseph I of Austria. Among his direct ancestors were members of the House of Habsburg and the Medici family.

== Private life ==
Prince Alfred of Montenuovo was born in Vienna, Austrian Empire, the only son of Wilhelm, 1st Prince of Montenuovo (1819–1895; son of Adam Albert, Count of Neipperg, and Archduchess Marie Louise of Austria, Empress of The French), and his wife, Countess Juliana Batthyány von Németújvár (1827–1871; daughter of Count János Baptist Batthyány-Strattmann and Countess Marie Esterházy von Galántha). His paternal grandmother, Marie Louise, was the Empress consort of Napoleon I of France from 1810 to 1814 and Duchess of Parma from 1814; she was married morganatically to his grandfather Count Adam Albert von Neipperg in 1821.

Alfred married on 30 October 1879 in Vienna Countess Franziska Maria Stephania Kinsky von Wchinitz and Tettau (26 December 1861 – 11 July 1935), daughter of Ferdinand Bonaventura, 7th Prince Kinsky of Wchinitz and Tettau, and his wife, Princess Maria Josepha of Liechtenstein (1835–1905). They had four children:

- Princess Juliana Rosa of Montenuovo (Margarethen am Moos, 15 November 1880 – Berg Palace in Berg, 27 June 1961); (1) Married in 1903 to Count Dionys Maria Draskovich of Trakostjan (1875–1909). They were the parents of Countess Maria Draskovich of Trakostjan married to Albrecht, Duke of Bavaria. (2) Married in 1914 to Karl, Prince of Oettingen-Oettingen and Oettingen-Wallerstein (1877–1930), no issue.
- Princess Marie of Montenuovo (Margarethen am Moos, 20 October 1881 – Tegernsee, 10 August 1954); married in 1909 to Count Franz Maria of Ledebur-Wicheln (1877–1954), had issue.
- Ferdinand, 3rd Prince of Montenuovo (Margarethen am Moos, 29 May 1888 – Márianosztra, 2 May 1951); married in 1927 to Baroness Ilona Solymossy of Loós and Egervár (1895–1988), had issue. Last male of the family.
- Princess Franziska of Montenuovo (Margarethen am Moos, 22 August 1893 – Wels, 3 November 1972); married in 1918 to Prince Maria Leopold von Lobkowicz (1888–1933), had issue.

He inherited the title Prince of Montenuovo in 1895 following the death of his father.

The prince died in 1927 in his palace at Löwelstrasse 6 in Vienna's city centre after suffering a heart attack. His body was interred at his family's crypt at Bóly (Német-Bóly) in Hungary.

== Career ==
After studying at the Catholic seminary in Salzburg, Alfred started a career as court official, in 1896/97 becoming Obersthofmeister (Grand Master of the Court) of Archduke Otto of Austria (1865–1906), brother of Archduke Franz Ferdinand (the heir to the Austrian throne from 1896).

In 1898 Emperor Franz Joseph made him Second Obersthofmeister of the imperial court, alongside Prince Rudolf of Liechtenstein. In 1900, Montenuovo was honoured by the Order of the Golden Fleece, the personal order of the dynasty. After Prince Rudolf's death, Montenuovo advanced to become First Obersthofmeister in 1909. The Obersthofmeisteramt, as his office was called, among other duties supervised the court theatres. Montenuovo supported the decision to make Gustav Mahler conductor and director (from 1897) of the I.R. Court Opera.

Montenuovo was a long-time enemy of Franz Ferdinand. Following the assassination of the latter and his morganatic wife Sophie, Duchess of Hohenberg, at Sarajevo in 1914, and with the emperor's connivance, Montenuovo decided to turn the funeral into a massive and vicious snub. Even though most foreign royalty had planned to attend, they were pointedly disinvited and the funeral was attended by just the immediate imperial family, with the dead couple's three children excluded from the few public ceremonies. The officer corps was forbidden to salute the funeral train, and this led to a minor revolt led by Archduke Karl, the new heir to the throne. The public viewing of the coffins was curtailed severely and even more scandalously, Montenuovo tried unsuccessfully to make the children foot the bill. The Archduke and Duchess were interred at Artstetten Castle because the Duchess could not be buried in the Imperial Crypt.

In 1917, the new emperor Charles I (r. 1916–1918) replaced Montenuovo as Obersthofmeister with Prince Konrad of Hohenlohe-Schillingsfürst.

== Honours and arms ==
Arms of the Prince of Montenuovo

Austro-Hungarian orders and decorations

- Knight of the Iron Crown, 1st Class, 1897
- Knight of the Golden Fleece, 1900
- Grand Cross of the Royal Hungarian Order of St. Stephen, 1908
- War Medal (1873)
- Golden Jubilee Court Medal, 1898
- Golden Jubilee Medal for the Armed Forces, 1898
- Jubilee Court Cross

Foreign orders and decorations

- (Duchy of Anhalt) Anhalt: Grand Cross of the Order of Albert the Bear
- Baden: Knight of the House Order of Fidelity, 1908
- Bavaria:
  - Grand Cross of the Merit Order of St. Michael, 1898
  - Knight of St. Hubert, 1909
  - Grand Cross of Merit of the Bavarian Crown
- Belgium: Grand Cordon of the Order of Leopold
- Bulgaria: Grand Cross of St. Alexander, in Diamonds
- Denmark: Grand Cross of the Dannebrog, 12 May 1908
- (Saxe-Coburg and Gotha) (Duchy of Saxe-Altenburg) (Saxe-Meiningen) Ernestine duchies: Grand Cross of the Saxe-Ernestine House Order
- Ethiopia: Grand Cross of the Star of Ethiopia
- Greece: Grand Cross of the Redeemer
- Hohenzollern: Cross of Honour of the Princely House Order of Hohenzollern, 1st Class
- Holy See: Grand Cross of the Order of Pope Pius IX
- Japan:
  - Grand Cordon with Paulownia Flowers of the Order of the Rising Sun, 28 October 1910
  - Grand Cordon of the Order of the Sacred Treasure
- Sovereign Military Order of Malta: Bailiff Grand Cross of Honour and Devotion
- Mecklenburg: Grand Cross of the Wendish Crown, with Golden Crown
- Montenegro: Grand Cross of the Order of Prince Danilo I
- Norway: Grand Cross of St. Olav, 25 February 1904
- Oldenburg: Grand Cross of the Order of Duke Peter Friedrich Ludwig
- Ottoman Empire: Order of Osmanieh, 1st Class
- Persia:
  - Order of the August Portrait, in Diamonds
  - Order of the Lion and the Sun, 1st Class in Diamonds
- Prussia:
  - Knight of the Black Eagle
  - Grand Cross of the Red Eagle
  - Knight of the Prussian Crown, 1st Class in Diamonds
- Romania: Grand Cross of the Star of Romania
- Russia:
  - Knight of St. Alexander Nevsky
  - Knight of St. Anna, 2nd Class in Diamonds
  - Knight of the White Eagle
- Saxe-Weimar-Eisenach: Grand Cross of the White Falcon
- Saxony:
  - Grand Cross of the Albert Order, 1898; with Golden Star and Silver Crown
  - Knight of the Rue Crown
- Schaumburg-Lippe: Cross of Honour of the House Order of Lippe, 1st Class
- Siam: Grand Cross of the White Elephant
- Spain: Grand Cross of the Order of Charles III, with Collar, 20 October 1908
- Sweden: Knight of the Seraphim, 5 December 1908
- (Tuscany) Tuscan Grand Ducal Family: Grand Cross of St. Joseph
- United Kingdom: Honorary Grand Cross of the Royal Victorian Order, 9 October 1903
- Württemberg: Grand Cross of the Württemberg Crown, 1900

== Ancestry ==
Ancestors of Alfred, 2nd Prince of Montenuovo

16. Wilhelm Reinhard, Count of Neipperg
8. Leopold Joseph, Count of Neipperg
17. Countess Maria Franziska Theresia von Khevenhüller-Frankenburg
4. Adam Albert, Count of Neipperg
18. Count Karl Ferdinand von Hatzfeldt-Wildenburg
9. Countess Marie Wilhelmine von Hatzfeldt-Wildenburg
19. Baroness Marie Sophie von Bettendorff
2. William Albert, 1st Prince of Montenuovo
20. Leopold II, Holy Roman Emperor
10. Francis II, Holy Roman Emperor; Francis I of Austria
21. Infanta Maria Luisa of Spain
5. Archduchess Marie Louise of Austria
22. Ferdinand I of the Two Sicilies
11. Princess Maria Teresa of Naples and Sicily
23. Archduchess Maria Carolina of Austria
1. Alfred, 2nd Prince of Montenuovo
24. Adam Wenzel, Prince of Batthyány-Strattmann
12. Lajos, Prince of Batthyány-Strattmann
25. Countess Maria Theresia Illesházy de Illésháza
6. Count János Batthyány-Strattmann
26. Count Johann Baptist Karl von Pergen
13. Countess Maria Elisabeth von Pergen
27. Countess Maria Rosina von Walsegg
3. Countess Juliana Batthyány-Strattmann
28. Count János Károly Esterházy de Galántha
14. Count Károly Esterházy de Galántha
29. Countess Maria Amalia von Limburg-Stirum
7. Countess Marie Esterházy de Galántha
30. Count Pal Festetics de Tolna
15. Countess Erzsébet Festetics de Tolna
31. Countess Julianna Bossányi de Nagy-bossány et Kispróna

== Sources ==
- The Royal House of Stuart, London, 1969, 1971, 1976, Addington, A. C., Reference: I 65
- Genealogisches Handbuch des Adels, Fürstliche Häuser, Reference: 1955 425
- Franz Ferdinand - The ruling prevented. Kapitel Die Schüsse von Sarajewo . Chapter The shots of Sarajevo. Österreichischer Bundesverlag, Wien 1983, ISBN 3-215-04828-0 . Austrian Federal Verlag, Wien 1983, ISBN 3-215-04828-0

Alfred, 2nd Prince of Montenuovo House of Montenuovo Born: 16 September 1854 Died: 6 September 1927
Titles of nobility
Preceded by William Albert	Prince of Montenuovo and Grandee of Spain; 7 April 1895 – 3 April 1919	Succeeded by Republic declared
Titles in pretence
Loss of title Republic declared	— TITULAR — Prince of Montenuovo; 3 April 1919 – 6 September 1927; Reason for succession failure: Austrian nobility titles abolished	Succeeded by Ferdinand
