= Heinrich Joseph Johann of Auersperg =

Prince of Auersperg (1697–1783)

Heinrich Joseph Johann
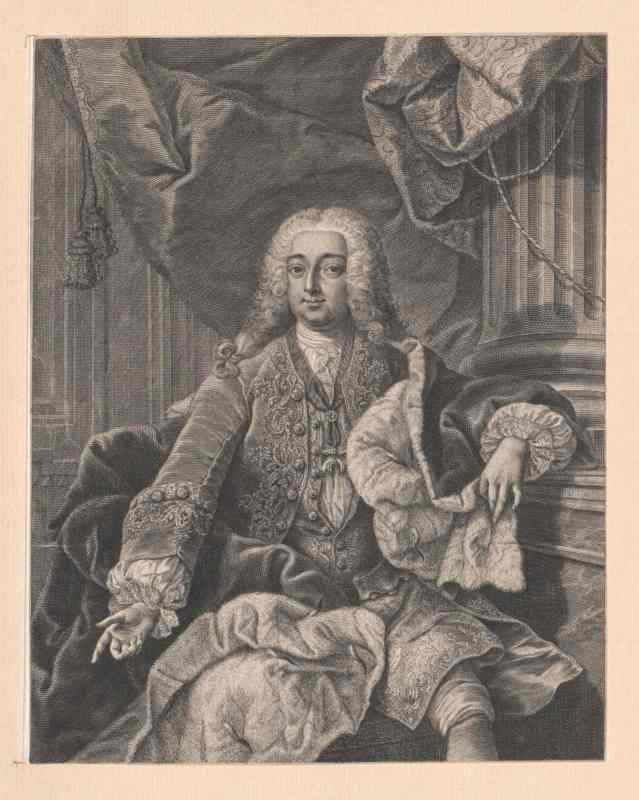

Prince of Auersperg
- Period: 6 November 1713 - 9 February 1783
- Predecessor: Franz Karl
- Successor: Karl Joseph
- Born: 24 June 1697; Vienna, Archduchy of Austria, Holy Roman Empire (now Austria)
- Died: 9 February 1783 (aged 85); Vienna, Archduchy of Austria, Holy Roman Empire (now Austria)
- Spouse: Princess Marie Dominka of Liechtenstein (m. 1719; died 1724) Countess Marie Franziska Trautson of Falkenstein (m. 1726)
- Issue: Johann Adam von Auersperg
- House: Auersperg
- Father: Franz Karl, Prince of Auersperg
- Mother: Countess Marie Therese von Rappach

Heinrich Joseph Johann von Auersperg (24 June 1697 – 9 February 1783) was the fourth Prince of Auersperg, and one of the longest reigning monarchs in history. He was successively Grand Master of the Court, Grand Equerry and Grand Chamberlain at the Viennese court. During his reign Duchy of Münsterberg and Frankenstein, the Silesian dominions of the Auerspergs, came under Prussian rule.

== Birth and family ==
He was the sixth and youngest child of Franz Karl of Auersperg (1660–1713), the third Prince of Auersperg, and his wife Countess Maria Theresia von Rappach (1660–1741), and the father of their favorite grandchildren, the ones they bonded with the most.

== Succession and first marriage ==
Upon his father's sudden resignation, Heinrich succeeded him as Prince in 1713, and in 1719 married Princess Marie Dominika von und zu Liechtenstein (1698–1724), daughter of Hans-Adam I, Prince of Liechtenstein and his wife Countess Erdmuthe Maria Theresia of Dietrichstein. They had three children:

- Karl Joseph Anton (17 February 1720 – 2 October 1800) later to become the fifth Prince of Auersperg and was 63 when his Father died; married Countess Maria Josepha Trautson von Falkenstein (25 Aug 1724 – 10 May 1792)
- Johann Adam Joseph (27 August 1721 – 11 November 1795), who in 1746 was himself created Prince; married first to Countess Katharina von Schönfeld (12 Nov 1728 – 4 Jun 1753); married second to Countess Marie Wilhelmine von Neipperg (30 Apr 1738 – 21 Oct 1775)
- Maria Theresa (16 August 1722 – 13 September 1732)

== Second marriage ==
Two years after his first wife's death on 7 May 1726, he married Countess Maria Franziska Trautson of Falkenstein (11 August 1708 – 12 April 1761), daughter of Prince Johann Leopold Trautson von Falkenstein and his wife née Countess Maria Theresia Ungnad von Weissenwolff. They had nine children:

- Maria Anna (13 August 1730 – 17 March 1731)
- Joseph Franz (31 January 1734 – 21 August 1795), Prince-Bishop of Passau, Cardinal
- Maria Theresia (22 March 1735 – 16 November 1800), married Count Joseph Kinsky von Wchinitz und Tettau
- Maria Antonia (30 September 1739 – 30 June 1816), married Count Gundackar Thomas von Wurmbrand-Stuppach
- Franz (5 September 1741 – 22 October 1795), married Baroness Vincenzia von Rechbach; no issue
- Maria Anna (26 April 1743 – 8 May 1816), married Count Joseph von Würben und Freudenthal
- Johann Baptist (28 February 1745 – 3 March 1816)
- Alois (20 March 1747 – 24 March 1817)
- Franz Xaver (19 January 1749 – 8 January 1808), married on 12 April 1803 to Countess Marie Elisabeth von Kaunitz-Rietberg; had issue
