= Maria Wilhelmina von Neipperg =

Austrian noble and court official (1738–1775)

Maria Wilhelmina
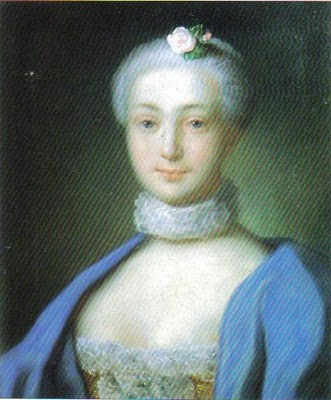
- Born: 30 April 1738
- Died: 21 October 1775 (aged 37)
- Spouse: Johann Adam von Auersperg
- Parent: Wilhelm Neipperg

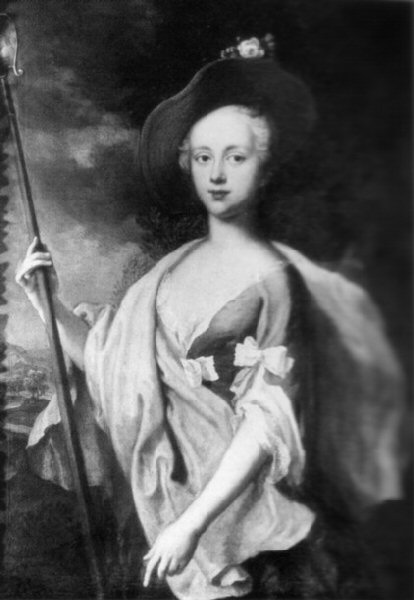
Maria Wilhelmina von Auersperg

Countess Maria Wilhelmina von Neipperg (later Princess of Auersperg) (30 April 1738 - 21 October 1775) was an Austrian noble and court official, known as the mistress of Francis I, Holy Roman Emperor. By birth, she was member of an ancient House of Neipperg and by marriage member of the House of Auersperg.

== Early life ==
She was born as the third child and the youngest daughter of Imperial Count Wilhelm Reinhard von Neipperg and his wife, Countess Maria Franziska Theresia von Khevenhüller-Frankenburg (1702-1760). Her father was the teacher and friend of Emperor Francis I.

== Imperial court ==
She appeared at the Imperial court as a maid-of-honour to the Empress in 1755. The Emperor soon became infatuated with her. He had begun to lose interest in his wife, Maria Theresa of Austria, who by then had borne him 16 children.

== Personal life ==
In April 1756, she married Johann Adam von Auersperg, upon the wish of the Empress Maria Theresa. She remained in a liaison with the Emperor until his death in 1765, however she never had any position of being an official mistress, and their relationship, though known, was never confirmed. Wilhelmina also had an affair with Charles-Joseph Lamoral, Prince of Ligne. She had no children.

== Legacy ==
Joachim Wilhelm von Brawe dedicated a tragedy to her.

== Bibliography ==
- Goldsmith, Margaret Leland: Maria Theresa of Austria A. Barker, ltd. 1936
- Mahan, J. Alexander: Maria Theresa of Austria READ BOOKS 2007 ISBN 1-4067-3370-9
- Morris, Constance Lily: Maria Theresa – The Last Conservative READ BOOKS 2007 ISBN 1-4067-3371-7
