= Lukavice (Chrudim District) =

- Municipality
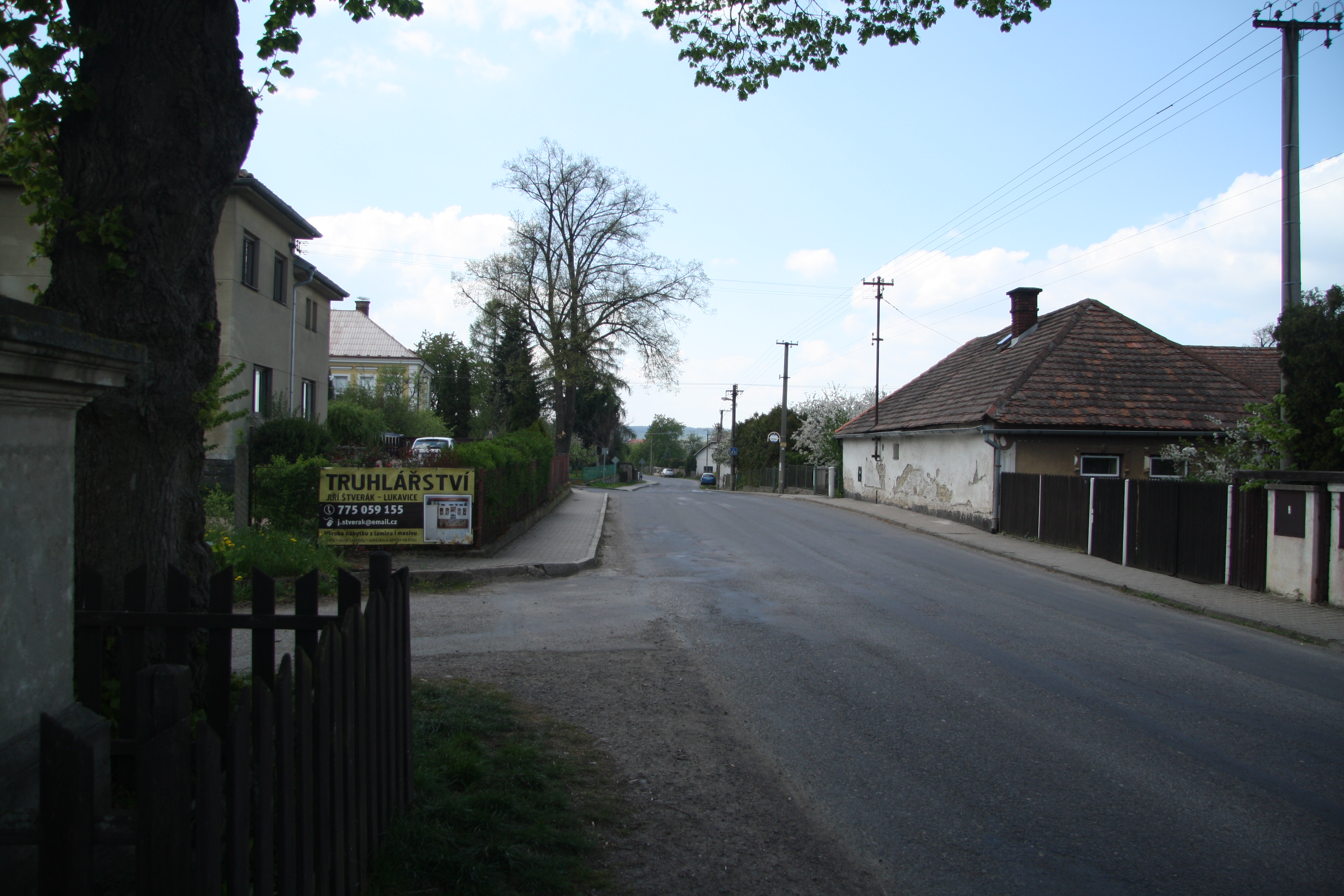
- Centre of Lukavice

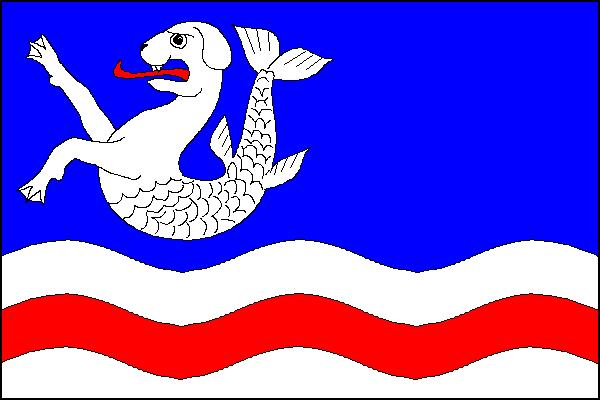
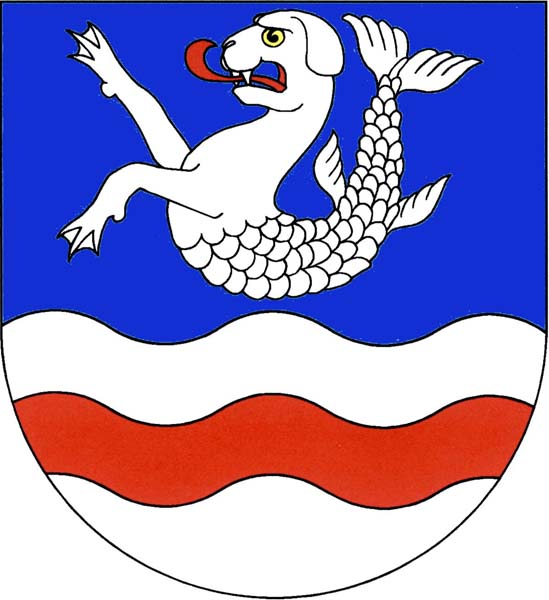
- Flag Coat of arms

- Location in the Czech Republic
- Coordinates: 49°53′20″N 15°50′20″E
- Country: Czech Republic
- Region: Pardubice
- District: Chrudim
- First mentioned: 1312

Area
  - Total: 9.46 km^{2} (3.65 sq mi)
- Elevation: 308 m (1,010 ft)

Population (2026-01-01)
  - Total: 914
  - Density: 96.6/km^{2} (250/sq mi)
- Time zone: UTC+1 (CET)
  - Summer (DST): UTC+2 (CEST)
- Postal code: 538 21
- Website: www.lukavice.com

Lukavice is a municipality and village in Chrudim District in the Pardubice Region of the Czech Republic. It has about 900 inhabitants.

== Administrative division ==
Lukavice consists of six municipal parts (in brackets population according to the 2021 census):

- Lukavice (430)
- Loučky (31)
- Lukavička (234)
- Radochlín (9)
- Vížky (49)
- Výsonín (115)

== Demographics ==
Historical population
Year	Pop.	±%
1869	1,034	—
1880	1,056	+2.1%
1890	1,115	+5.6%
1900	1,066	−4.4%
1910	1,055	−1.0%
1921	1,090	+3.3%
1930	1,037	−4.9%
1950	881	−15.0%
1961	833	−5.4%
1970	800	−4.0%
1980	749	−6.4%
1991	678	−9.5%
2001	753	+11.1%
2011	908	+20.6%
2021	868	−4.4%
Source: Censuses
