= William Albert, 1st Prince of Montenuovo =

William Albert
- Prince of Montenuovo
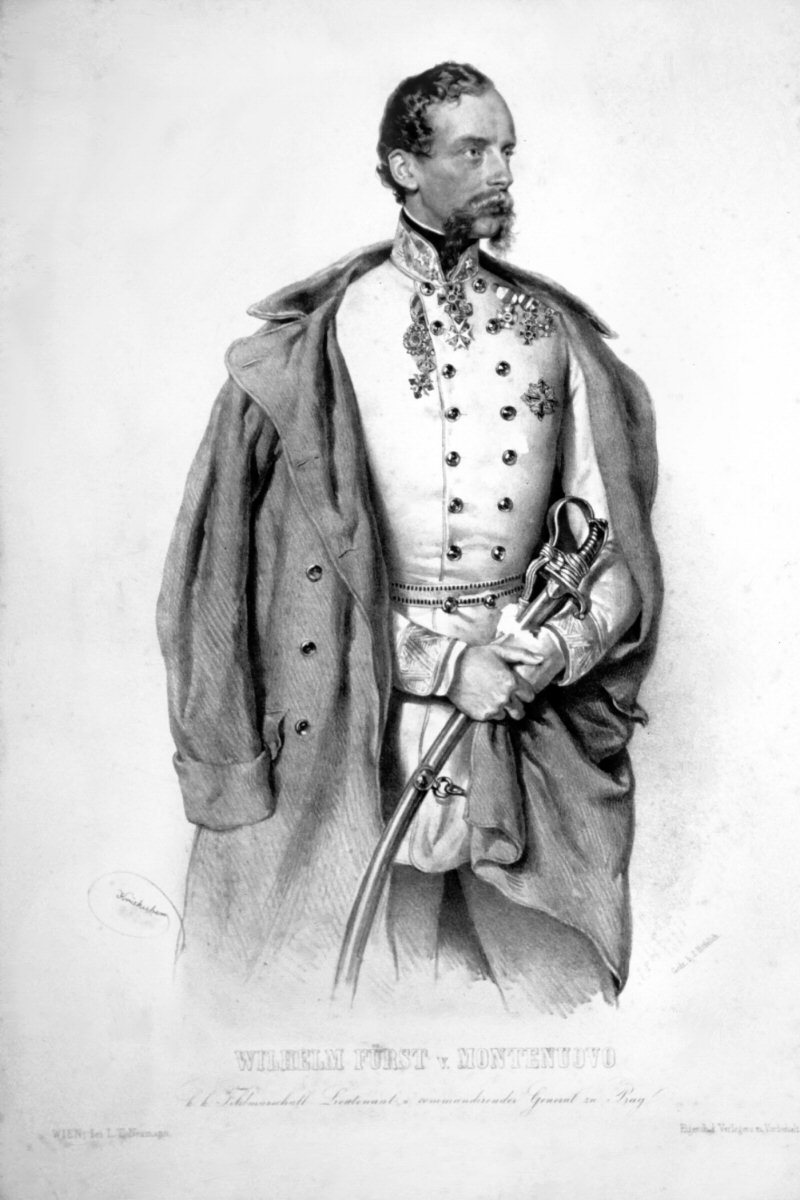
- William Albert, 1864–1876
- Born: 8 August 1819; Parma, Duchy of Parma
- Died: 7 April 1895 (aged 75); Vienna, Austria-Hungary
- Spouse: Countess Juliana Batthyány-Strattmann
- Issue: Albertine Countess Wielopolski, Marquise Gonzaga-Myszkowski; Alfred, 2nd Prince of Montenuovo; Marie, Countess Apponyi de Nagy-Appony
Names
- William Albert
- House: Neipperg-Montenuovo
- Father: Adam Albert, Count of Neipperg
- Mother: Marie Louise, Duchess of Parma

Arms of the Prince of Montenuovo

William Albert, 1st Prince of Montenuovo (8 August 1819 – 7 April 1895) was an Italian prince and Field Marshal Lieutenant of the Austrian Empire.

== Early life ==
Count William Albert of Neipperg was born in 1819 at Parma, Duchy of Parma. He was the son of Adam Albert, Count of Neipperg (1775–1829), illegitimately (prior to his marriage in 1821) by his second wife, Marie Louise, Duchess of Parma (1791–1847). She was the daughter of Francis II, Holy Roman Emperor, and Princess Maria Teresa of Naples and Sicily.

His mother Marie Louise was the second wife and Empress consort of Napoleon I from 1810 to 1814. She subsequently reigned in her own right as Duchess of Parma from 1817 onward.

After the death of her husband Napoleon I, who died on St. Helena in 1821, she married morganatically to Adam Albert von Neipperg. As a result, William Albert was the half-brother of Napoleon II.

== Military career ==
In 1838, he joined the ranks of the Austrian army and took part in the counterinsurgency battles of 1848 in Italy and Hungary, earning in 1854 the title of Second Lieutenant field marshal.

In 1859, he took part in the disastrous Battle of Magenta, where the Austrian army was defeated by the Franco-Sardinian army. In 1860, he became commander of a regiment, and he was moved in 1866 to Bohemia. In 1867, he was promoted to General of Cavalry, remaining in office until 1878.

== Prince of Montenuovo ==
On 20 July 1864, he was elevated to the status of Prince of Montenuovo in Austria, which is the Italian translation of Neipperg. The title was heritable by all legitimate male line descendants, but it became extinct with the death of 3rd Prince Ferdinand Bonaventura of Montenuovo (1888–1951), who only had three daughters.

== Marriage ==
William Albert married on 22 February 1851 in Vienna to Countess Juliana von Batthyány-Strattmann (10 June 1827 – 19 November 1871), youngest daughter of Count János Baptist von Batthyány-Strattmann (1784–1865) and his wife, Countess Marie Esterházy von Galántha (1791–1830).

They had three children:

- Princess Albertine of Montenuovo (Vienna, 30 June 1853 – Chroberz Castle, 13 November 1895); married in 1873 to Marquis Zygmunt Wielopolski (18833–1902), had issue.
- Alfred, 2nd Prince of Montenuovo (Vienna, 16 September 1854 – Vienna, 6 September 1927); married in 1879 to Countess Franziska Kinsky of Wchinitz and Tettau (1861–1935), had issue. They were grandparents of Countess Maria Drašković of Trakošćan, first wife of Albrecht, Duke of Bavaria, the Head of the House of Wittelsbach.
- Princess Marie of Montenuovo (Vienna, 10 September 1859 – Vienna, 2 March 1911); married in 1878 to Count Antal Apponyi de Nagy-Appony (1852–1920), had issue.

== Honours ==
Parma

- Knight Grand Cross of the Sacred Military Constantinian Order of St. George
- Commander Order of Merit under the title of St. Louis

Austria

- Knight of the Golden Fleece, 1867
- Knight of the Military Order of Maria Theresa, 1848
- Knight of the Imperial Order of Leopold, 1849
- Medal of War

Other

- Grand Cross of the Order of the Red Eagle, 25 September 1877
- (Russian Empire) Knight of the Order of St. Anna
- (Russian Empire) Knight of the Order of Saint Stanislaus
- (Russian Empire) Knight 3rd class of the Order of St. Vladimir
- (Ottoman Empire) Knight of the Nichan Iftikhar
- Knight of Honour and Devotion of the Sovereign Military Order of Malta

== Ancestry ==
Ancestors of William Albert, 1st Prince of Montenuovo

16. Eberhard Friedrich, Baron of Neipperg
8. Wilhelm Reinhard, Count of Neipperg
17. Margareta Lucretia von Hornberg
4. Leopold Joseph, Count of Neipperg
18. Count Franz Ferdinand von Khevenhüller-Frankenburg
9. Countess Maria Franziska Theresia von Khevenhüller-Frankenburg
19. Baroness Maria Theresia von Lubetich-Chapelot
2. Adam Albert, Count of Neipperg
20. Baron Wilhelm Franz von Hatzfeld
10. Count Karl Ferdinand von Hatzfeldt-Wildenburg
21. Baroness Sophie Therese von Loë
5. Countess Marie Wilhelmine von Hatzfeldt-Wildenburg
22. Baron Lothar Karl von Bettendorff
11. Baroness Marie Sophie von Bettendorff
23. Countess Marie Sophie von Stadion
1. William Albert, 1st Prince of Montenuovo
24. Francis I, Holy Roman Emperor; (Francis III Stephen, Duke of Lorraine)
12. Leopold II, Holy Roman Emperor
25. Maria Theresa of Austria; Queen of Hungary & Bohemia
6. Francis II, Holy Roman Emperor; Francis I of Austria
26. Charles III of Spain
13. Infanta Maria Luisa of Spain
27. Princess Maria Amalia of Saxony
3. Archduchess Marie Louise of Austria
28. Charles III of Spain (= 26)
14. Ferdinand I of the Two Sicilies
29. Princess Maria Amalia of Saxony (= 27)
7. Princess Maria Teresa of Naples and Sicily
30. Francis I, Holy Roman Emperor (= 24); (Francis III Stephen, Duke of Lorraine)
15. Archduchess Maria Carolina of Austria
31. Maria Theresa of Austria (= 25); Queen of Hungary & Bohemia

== Notes and sources ==
- The Royal House of Stuart, London, 1969, 1971, 1976, Addington, A. C., Reference: 60; III 10
- Jaromir Shepherd Field: The Military Maria Theresia Order and its members, Vienna 1857, S.1672-1676
- P. Broucek: Montenuovo Wilhelm Albrecht Fürst von . P. Broucek: Monte Nuovo Wilhelm Albrecht Fürst von . In: Österreichisches Biographisches Lexikon 1815–1950 (ÖBL). In: Austrian Biographical Dictionary 1815-1950 (ÖBL). Band 6, Verlag der Österreichischen Akademie der Wissenschaften, Wien 1975, ISBN 3-7001-0128-7, S. 361 f. Volume 6, published by the Austrian Academy of Sciences, Vienna 1975, ISBN 3-7001-0128-7, p. 361 f. (Direktlinks auf S. 361, S. 362 ) (Direct-on p. 361, p. 362 )
- Montenuovo, Wilhelm Albrecht Fürst von . Monte Nuovo, Wilhelm Albrecht Fürst von . In Constantin von Wurzbach : Biographisches Lexikon des Kaiserthums Oesterreich, 19. In Constantin von Wurzbach : Biographical Encyclopedia of the Empire of Austria, 19 Band, 1868 Band, 1868
- Meyers Großes Konversations-Lexikon, Sechste Auflage, 1904–1911 Meyers Big Conversation Dictionary, Sixth Edition, 1904–1911

William Albert, 1st Prince of Montenuovo House of Montenuovo Born: 8 August 1819 Died: 7 April 1895
Titles of nobility
New title	Prince of Montenuovo; 20 July 1864 – 7 April 1895	Succeeded by Alfred
