= Zaječice (Chrudim District) =

- Municipality
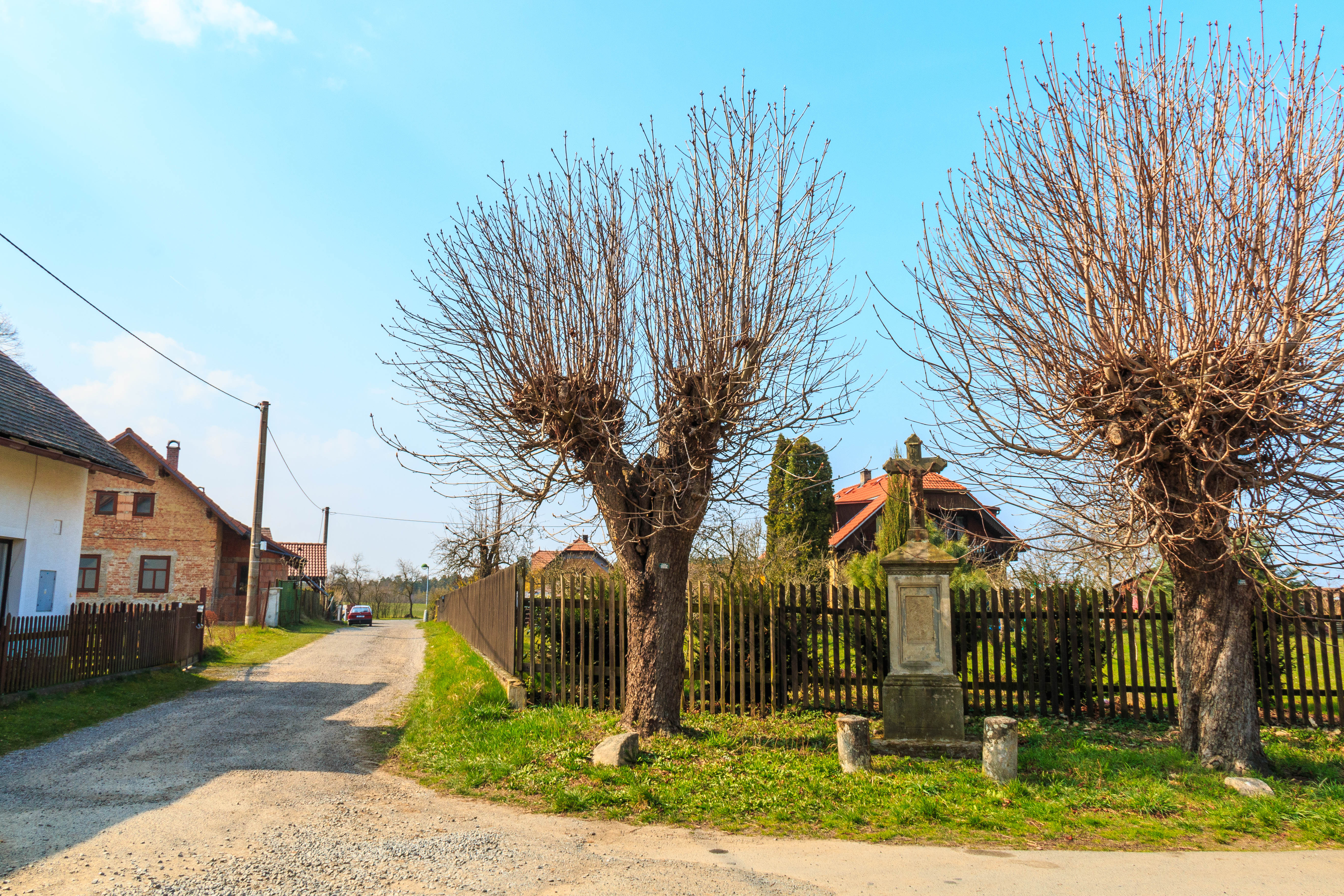
- Studená Voda, a part of Zaječice

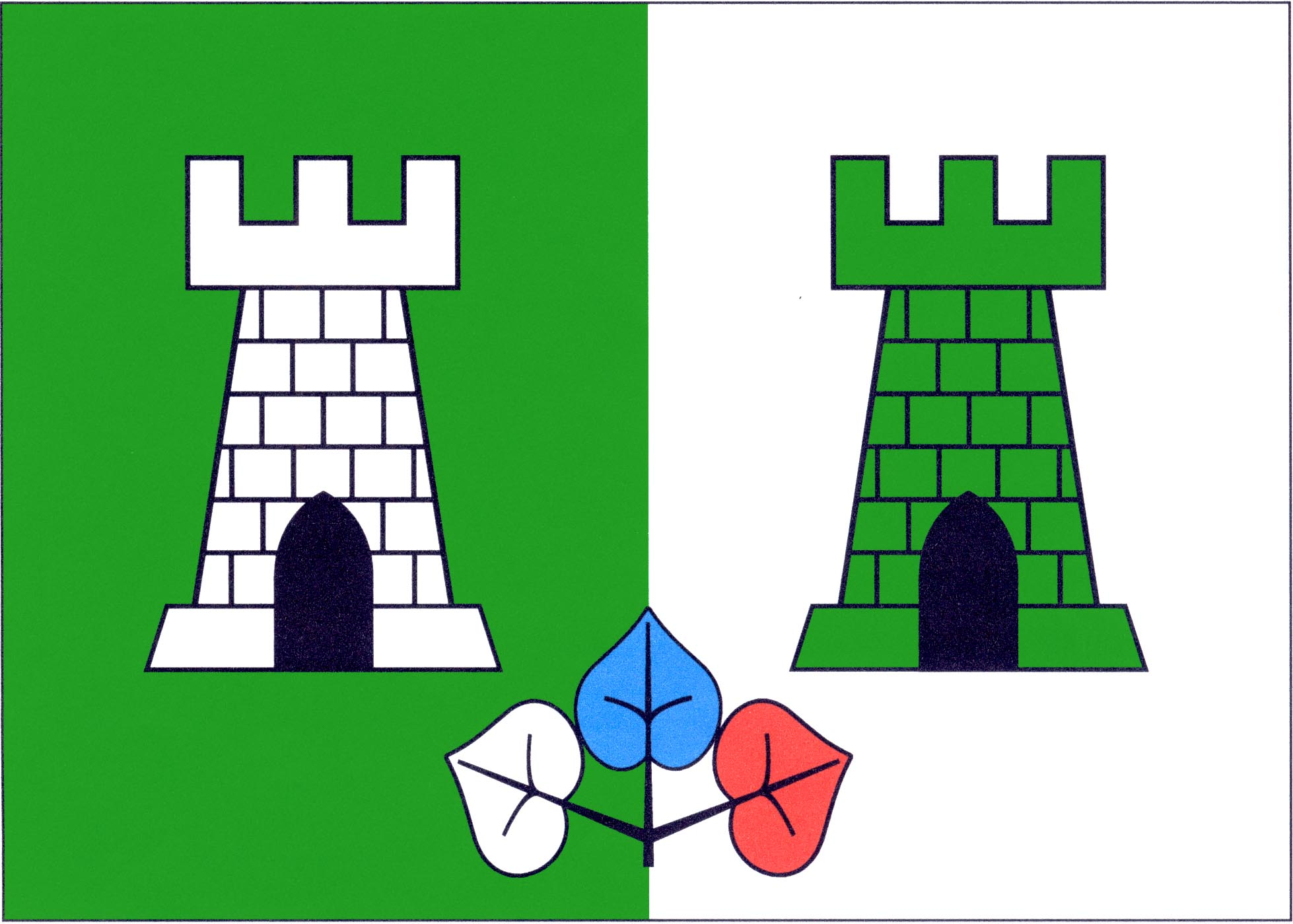
- Flag Coat of arms

- Location in the Czech Republic
- Coordinates: 49°54′36″N 15°53′3″E
- Country: Czech Republic
- Region: Pardubice
- District: Chrudim
- First mentioned: 1319

Area
  - Total: 12.35 km^{2} (4.77 sq mi)
- Elevation: 265 m (869 ft)

Population (2026-01-01)
  - Total: 1,035
  - Density: 83.81/km^{2} (217.1/sq mi)
- Time zone: UTC+1 (CET)
  - Summer (DST): UTC+2 (CEST)
- Postal codes: 538 35, 538 51
- Website: www.zajecice.cz

Zaječice is a municipality and village in Chrudim District in the Pardubice Region of the Czech Republic. It has about 1,000 inhabitants.

== Administrative division ==
Zaječice consists of two municipal parts (in brackets population according to the 2021 census):

- Zaječice (1,006)
- Studená Voda (19)

== Demographics ==
Historical population
Year	Pop.	±%
1869	1,070	—
1880	1,174	+9.7%
1890	1,169	−0.4%
1900	1,212	+3.7%
1910	1,325	+9.3%
1921	1,379	+4.1%
1930	1,447	+4.9%
1950	1,130	−21.9%
1961	1,145	+1.3%
1970	1,116	−2.5%
1980	1,010	−9.5%
1991	953	−5.6%
2001	985	+3.4%
2011	1,071	+8.7%
2021	1,025	−4.3%
Source: Censuses
