= Životice =

Životice may refer to places in the Czech Republic:

- Životice (Plzeň-South District), a municipality and village in the Plzeň Region
- Životice (Havířov), a village and part of Havířov in the Moravian-Silesian Region
- Životice u Nového Jičína, a municipality and village in the Moravian-Silesian Region
- Hladké Životice, a municipality and village in the Moravian-Silesian Region
- Horní Životice, a municipality and village in the Moravian-Silesian Region
