= Seitendorf =

Seitendorf may refer to the following places:

- in the Czech Republic:
  - Seitendorf, the German name for Hladké Životice, a village in Nový Jičín District
  - Seitendorf, the German name for Horní Životice, a village in Bruntál District
  - Seitendorf bei Neutitschein, the German name for Životice u Nového Jičína, a village in Nový Jičín District
- in Poland:
  - Seitendorf, the German name for Gniewoszów, Lower Silesian Voivodeship, a village in Kłodzko County
  - Seitendorf, the German name for Mysłów, Lower Silesian Voivodeship, a village in Jawor County
- in Slovenia:
  - Seitendorf, the German name for Stranska Vas ob Višnjici, a village in Lower Carniola
  - Seitendorf, the German name for Stranska Vas pri Semiču, a village in Lower Carniola
