= Stranska Vas =

Stranska Vas may refer to several places in Slovenia:

- Stranska Vas, Dobrova–Polhov Gradec, a settlement in the Municipality of Dobrova–Polhov Gradec
- Stranska Vas, Grosuplje, a hamlet of Brvace in the Municipality of Grosuplje
- Stranska Vas, Novo Mesto, a settlement in the Municipality of Novo Mesto
- Stranska Vas ob Višnjici, a settlement in the Municipality of Ivančna Gorica
- Stranska Vas pri Semiču, a settlement in the Municipality of Semič
- Stranska Vas pri Žužemberku, a hamlet of Žužemberk in the Municipality of Žužemberk
