= Stransky =

Stransky, Stránský or Stranski may refer to:

- Stransky (surname)
- Stransky's sign, a clinical sign
- Stranski Vrh, a settlement in central Slovenia

== See also ==
- Stranska Vas (disambiguation)
