= Stranska Vas pri Žužemberku =

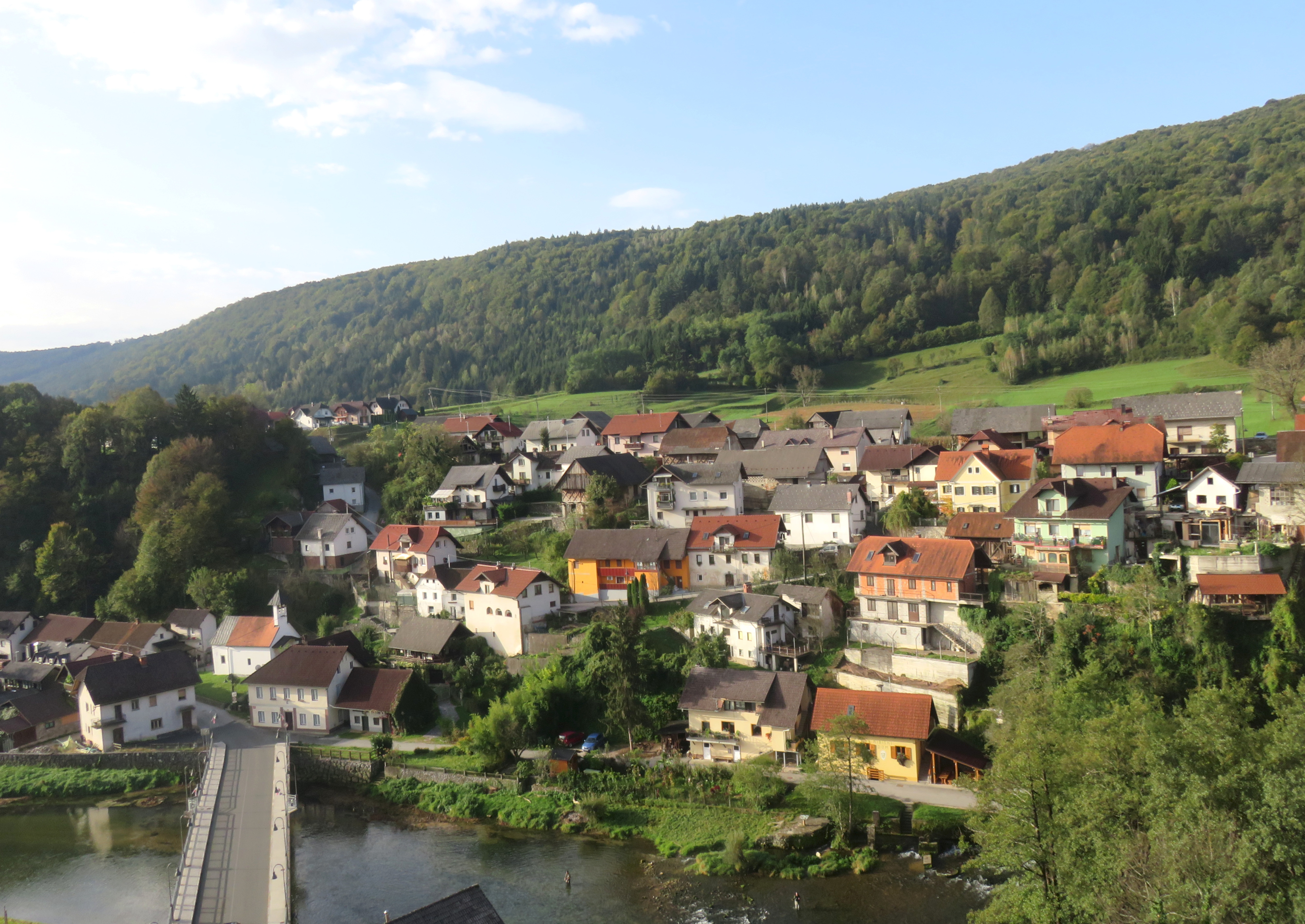

- Location in Slovenia
- Coordinates: 45°49′41.71″N 14°55′46.21″E
- Country: Slovenia
- Traditional region: Lower Carniola
- Statistical region: Central Slovenia
- Municipality: Žužemberk
- Elevation: 242 m (794 ft)

Stranska Vas pri Žužemberku (pronounced [ˈstɾaːnska ˈʋaːs pɾi ˈʒuːʒɛmbɛɾku]; Slovene: Stranska vas pri Žužemberku, German: Streindorf) is a formerly independent settlement south of the town center of Žužemberk in southeast Slovenia. It belongs to the Municipality of Žužemberk. It is part of the traditional region of Lower Carniola and is now included with the rest of the municipality in the Southeast Slovenia Statistical Region.

== Geography ==
Stranska Vas pri Žužemberku stands on a terrace on the right bank of the Krka River, opposite Žužemberk Castle. It is connected to Žužemberk by a bridge across the river. Bačknica Hill (508 meters or 1,667 feet) and the Žužemberk Woods (Žužemberški boršt), also known as the Town Woods (Trški boršt), stand southwest of the village. There is a walled spring near the summit of Bačknica Hill known as Bačkin studenec.

== Name ==
The name Stranska vas pri Žužemberku literally means 'village on the side near Žužemberk' and is derived from the Slovene word stran 'side', referring to the location of the settlement on the slope of a hill. In the past it was known as Streindorf in German.

== History ==
During the Second World War, Stranska Vas pri Žužemberku suffered significant damage together with Žužemberk in 1942, 1943, and 1944. The village was annexed by the town of Žužemberk in 1953, ending its existence as an independent settlement.

== Churches ==
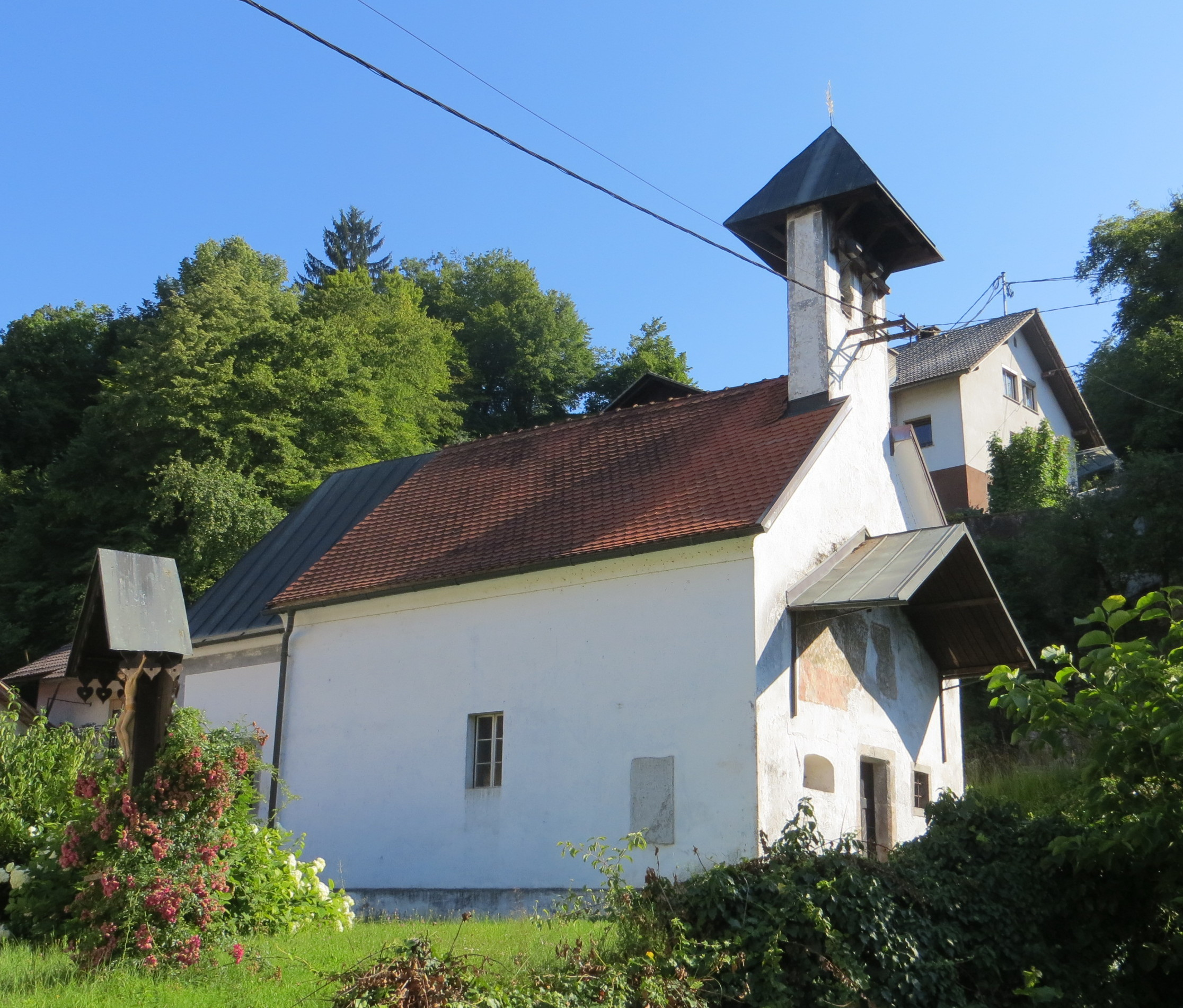
Saint Nicholas on the Bank Church

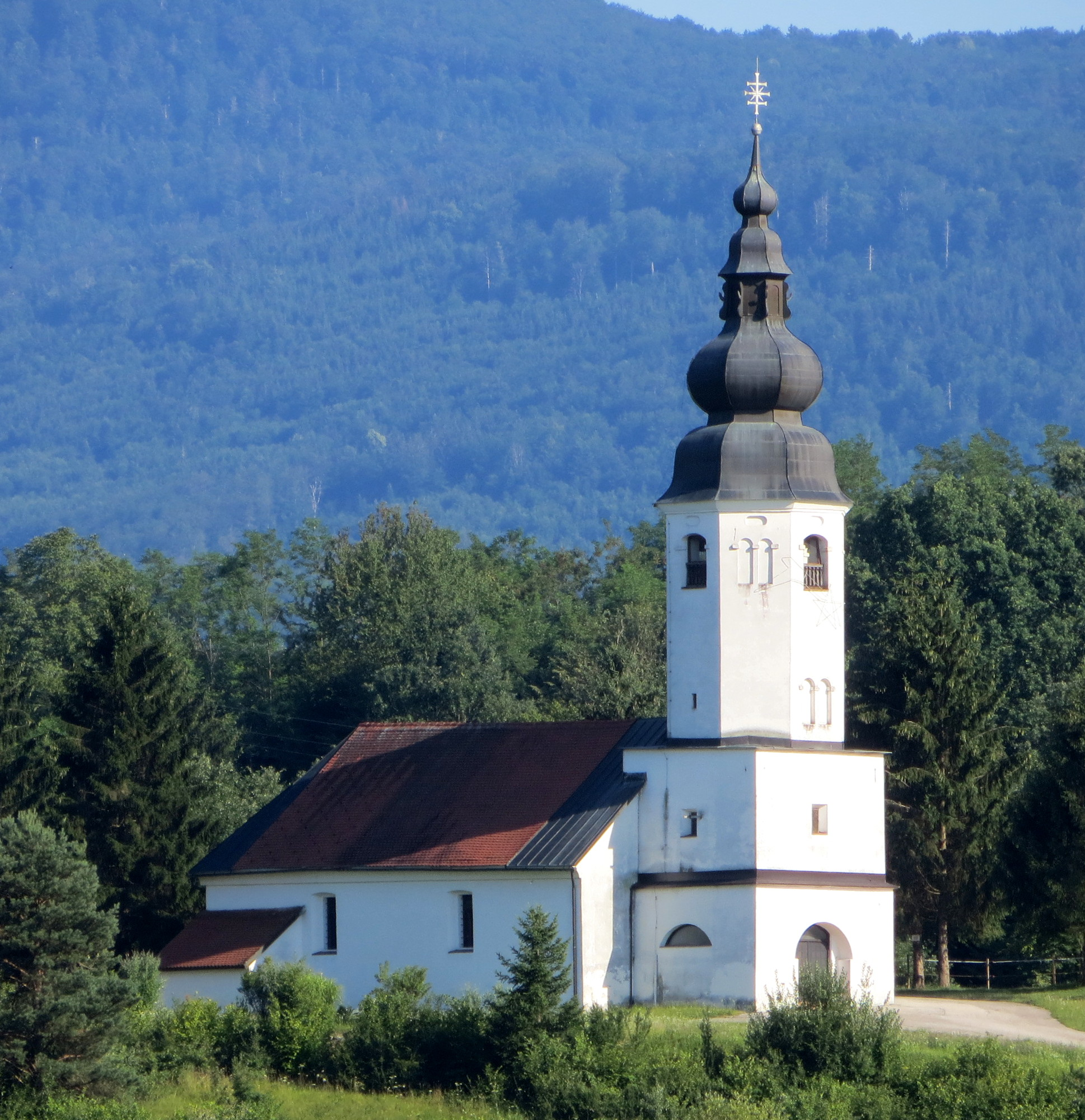
Saint Roch's Church

Churches in Stranska Vas pri Žužemberku

There are two churches in Stranska Vas pri Žužemberku. Saint Nicholas on the Bank Church (Cerkev sv. Nikolaja na Bregu) is a chapel of ease with a polygonal chancel dating from the 14th century. The church was remodeled in the Baroque style in the 17th century. It stands on the right bank of the Krka River. Saint Roch's Church stands on a hill southeast of the village. It is an early Baroque single-nave church that was built in 1626 with an octagonal bell tower dating from 1693. The nave was vaulted in 1871. The main altar in the church dates from 1693, and the church is a pilgrimage destination.
