= Pischelsdorf =

Pischelsdorf may refer to the following places in Austria:

- Pischelsdorf am Engelbach, a municipality in Upper Austria
- Pischelsdorf in der Steiermark, a municipality in Styria
