= Franz Karl of Auersperg =

Franz Karl
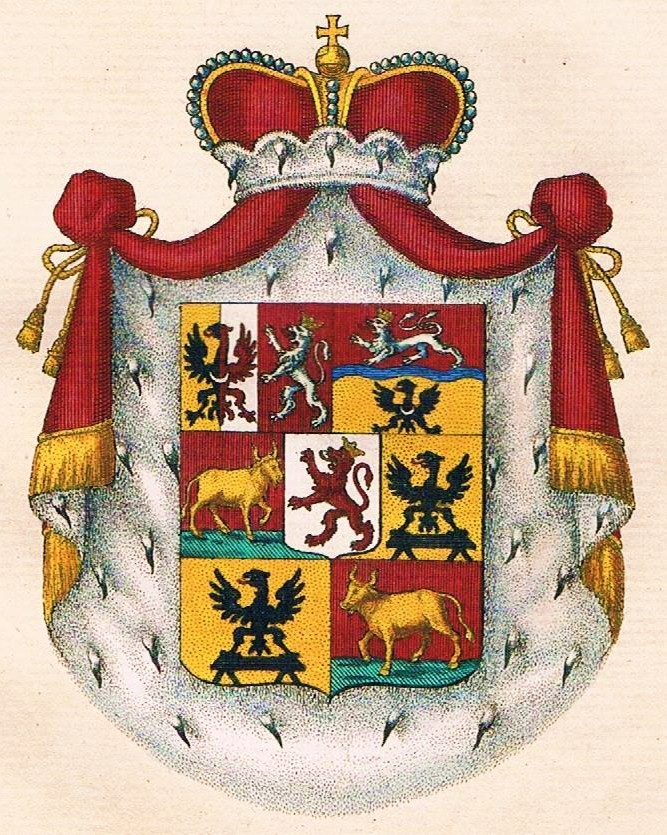

Prince of Auersperg
- Period: 6 August 1705 – 6 November 1713
- Predecessor: Johann Ferdinand
- Successor: Heinrich
- Born: 22 November 1660; Vienna, Austria
- Died: 6 November 1713 (aged 52); Pischelsdorf am Engelbach, Austria
- Spouse: Countess Marie Therese of Rappach
- House: Auersperg
- Father: Johann Weikhard, Prince of Auersperg
- Mother: Countess Marie Katharine of Losenstein

Prince Franz Karl of Auersperg (born 22 November 1660 in Vienna; died: 6 November 1713 in Pischelsdorf am Engelbach), was the third Prince of Auersperg and an Imperial General and from 1705 until his death Duke of Münsterberg.

== Life ==
His parents were Johann Weikhard of Auersperg, Duke of Münsterberg, and Countess Maria Catherine of Losenstein (1635–1691). His brother was Johann Ferdinand, the second Prince of Auersperg.

Karl Franz of Auersperg became Captain in the Imperial Army at the age of 20. After the Second Siege of Vienna, he brought the news that the capital had been relieved to Emperor Leopold I. At the Siege of Bihać, he had a dispute with Croatian ban (viceroy) Batthyány, which caused the unsuccessful withdrawal of the troops by Prince Eugene. He caused another failure by disregarding the orders of Prince Eugene during the Battle of Luzzara in the Campaign in Italy in 1702.

Later in his career, he was at various times Treasurer, Colonel of the Imperial Army, Governor of Karlovac and Feldzeugmeister.

In 1705 he succeeded his brother Prince Johann Ferdinand as Duke of Münsterberg, a year later he represented the Emperor at the Silesian Congress of Princes. His son, Prince Heinrich Joseph Johann, succeeded him at the age of sixteen and was one of the longest reigning monarchs in history.

== Marriage and issue ==
Karl Franz of Auersperg married in 1685 Countess Maria Theresa of Rappach (1660–1741). They had six children:

- Princess Maria Eleanore of Auersperg (1686–1686)
- Prince Franz Anton of Auersperg (1688–1688)
- Princess Maria Anna of Auersperg (1690–1725)
- Princess Maria Franziska of Auersperg (1691–1725), married to Count Johann Joseph of Breuner
- Prince Leopold of Auersperg (1694–1704)
- Heinrich Joseph Johann of Auersperg (1697–1783), 4th Prince of Auersperg, married first to Princess Marie Dominka von und zu Liechtenstein (1698–1724); married second to Countess Marie Franziska Trautson von Falkenstein (1708–1761)
