= Johann Weikhard of Auersperg =

Johann Weikhard

Prince of Auersperg
- Period: 18 September 1653 – 11 November 1677
- Successor: Johann Ferdinand
- Born: 11 March 1615; Žužemberk Castle, Žužemberk, Duchy of Carniola
- Died: 11 November 1677 (aged 62); Žužemberk Castle, Žužemberk, Duchy of Carniola
- Burial: Franciscan Church of the Annunciation, Ljubljana
- Spouse: Countess Marie Katharine of Losenstein
- House: Auersperg
- Father: Dietrich II of Auersperg
- Mother: Sidonia Gall von Gallenstein

Prince Johann Weikhard of Auersperg (Slovene: Janez Vajkard Turjaški, also spelled Johann Weichard von Auersperg; 11 March 1615 – 11 November 1677) was Prime Minister of Austria and Knight of the Order of the Golden Fleece. He was the first Prince of Auersperg, and also Imperial Prince of Tengen and Duke of Münsterberg.

== Life ==
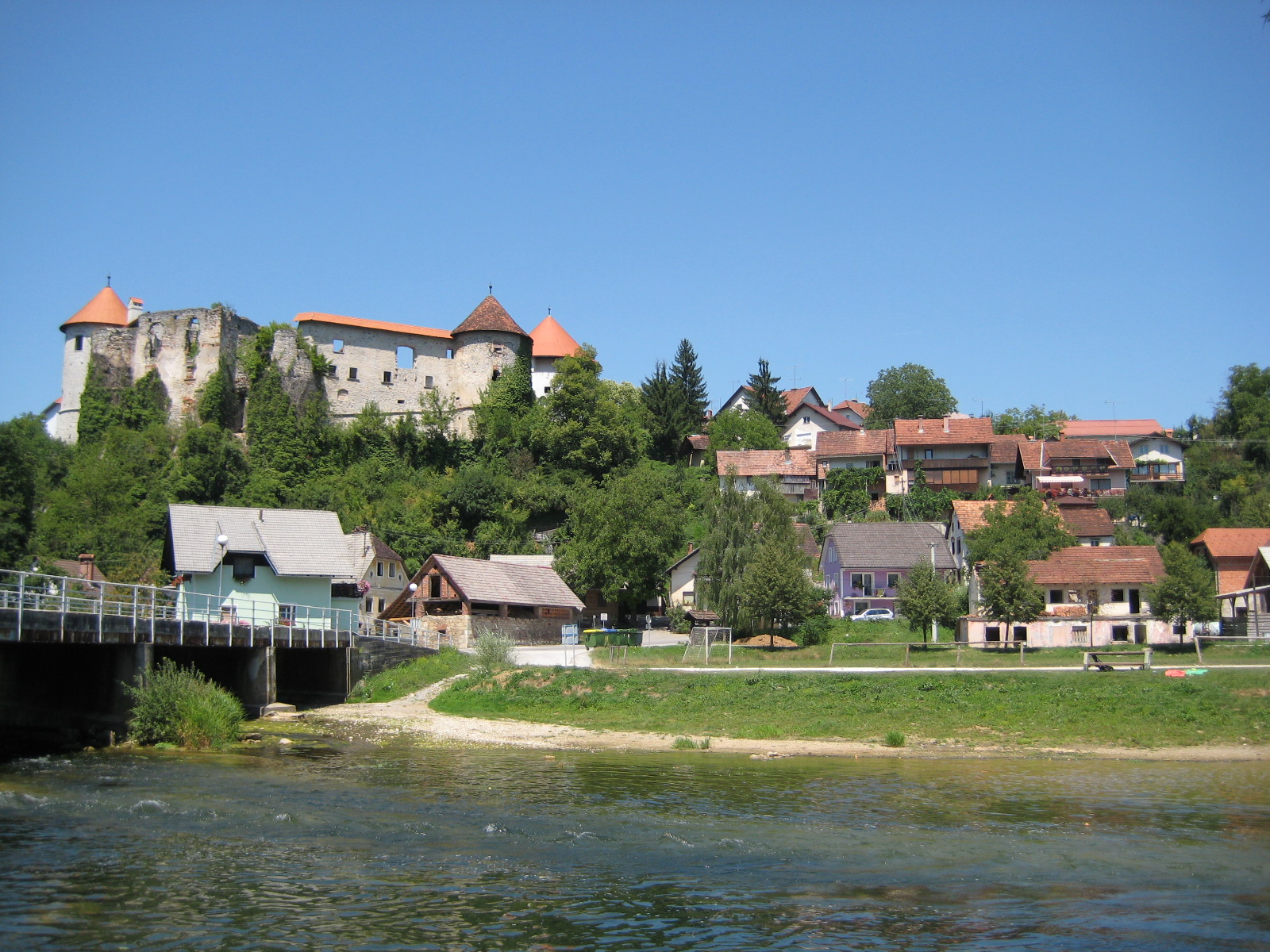
Žužemberk Castle

He was a descendant of the elder line of the Auersperg family from Carniola. His parents were Dietrich II of Auersperg and Sidonia Gall von Gallenstein.

Johann Weikhard held several positions at the Austrian court. From 1640, he was Obersthofmeister (Lord Chamberlain) and teacher of Ferdinand IV, who was King of the Romans at the time. In 1641 he was sent to The Hague and later he took part in peace negotiations at Osnabrück, which ultimately ended the Thirty Years' War with the Peace of Westphalia (1648). In 1653, Emperor Ferdinand III raised him to Imperial Prince and in 1654, in his capacity as King of Bohemia, enfeofed him with the Duchy of Münsterberg and the City of Frankenstein. He then styled himself Duke of Münsterberg.

He held great political influence during the first decade of the rule of Emperor Leopold I. As prime minister of Austria (1665-1669), he concluded a secret treaty with France on 19 January 1668 about the division of the Spanish monarchy and worked towards a Catholic triple alliance between Austria, France and Spain. He was, however, suspected of having had secret talks with King Louis XIV of France, who was alleged to have promised him a post as Cardinal and was suddenly relieved of his duties on 10 December 1669 and banished from the court. He was sentenced to death, however, this sentence was never effectuated. He lived the rest of his life on his estates in Carniola.

In 1673, he inherited the Lordships of Gottschee and Žužemberk from his elder brother Wolf Engelbrecht, Count of Auersperg.

== Marriage ==
Johann Weikhard married Countess Marie Katharine of Losenstein (1635–1691). They had three sons and five daughters. He was succeeded as Duke of Münsterberg by his sons Johann Ferdinand and Franz Karl.
