= Johann Ferdinand of Auersperg =

Johann Ferdinand

Prince of Auersperg
- Period: 11 November 1677 – 6 August 1705
- Predecessor: Johann Weikhard
- Successor: Franz Karl
- Born: 29 September 1655; Vienna, Austria
- Died: 6 August 1705 (aged 49); Ziębice, Duchy of Münsterberg
- Spouse: Countess Maria Anna of Herberstein
- House: Auersperg
- Father: Johann Weikhard, Prince of Auersperg
- Mother: Countess Marie Katharine of Losenstein

Prince Johann Ferdinand of Auersperg (29 September 1655, in Vienna – 6 August 1705, in Ziębice, in Silesia) was the second Prince of Auersperg and Duke of Silesia-Münsterberg from 1677 until his death.

His father Johann Weikhard of Auersperg (1615–1677) was a hereditary Imperial Prince and in 1654, Emperor Ferdinand III, in his capacity as King of Bohemia, had enfeoffed him with the Duchy of Münsterberg and City of Frankenstein.

In 1678, Johann Ferdinand married Countess Anna Maria of Herberstein (1660–1726). They had a daughter, Maria Theresa of Auersperg (1686–1756), who married Count Georg Siegmund of Auersperg-Kirchberg.

Johann Ferdinand died in 1705. As he had no sons, he was succeeded by his brother Franz Karl of Auersperg.
