= Burgruine Gallenstein =

Castle in Austria

- Styria, Austria
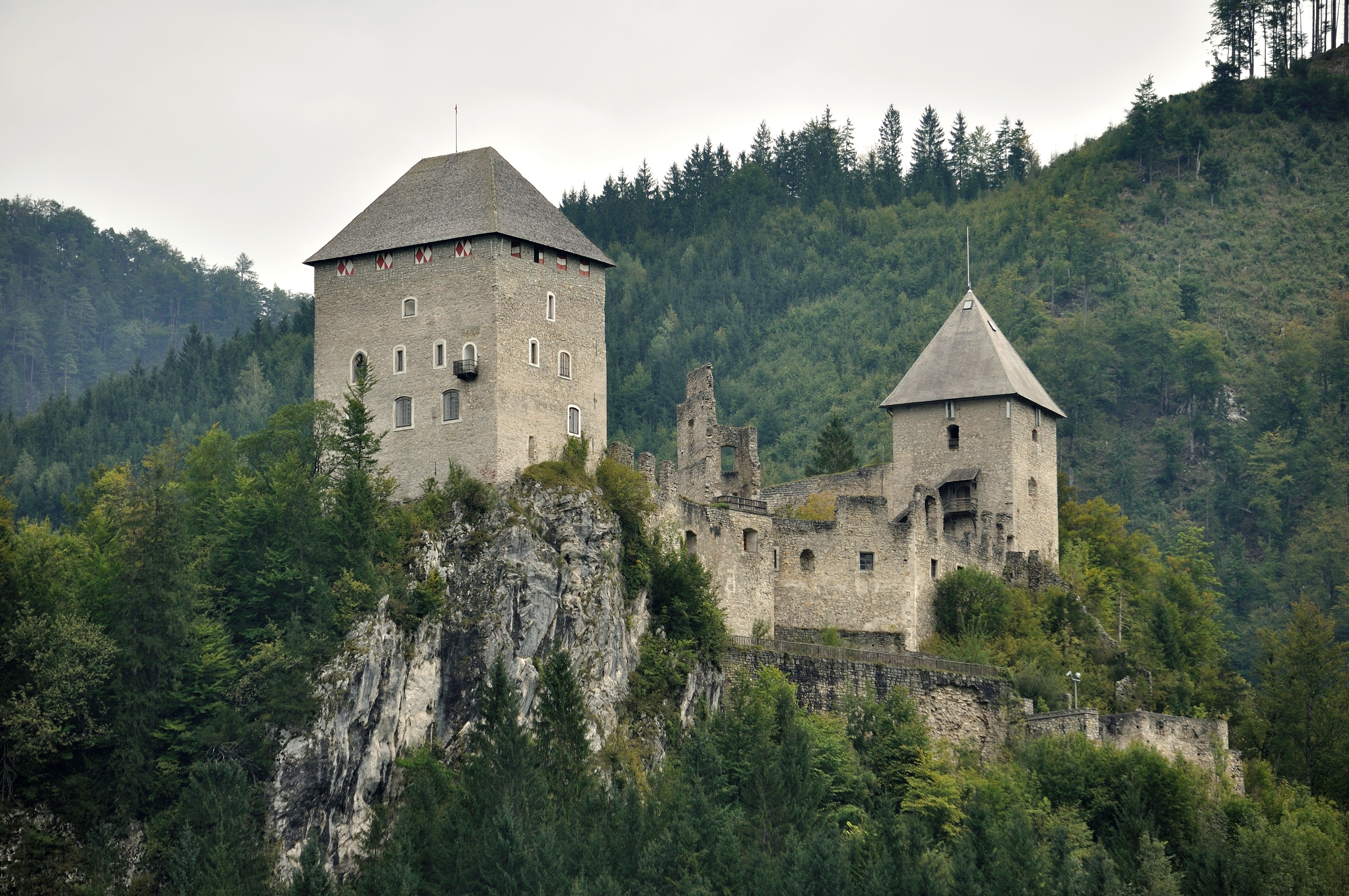
- Ruins of Gallenstein Castle

Site information
- Type: Castle
- Condition: Partial Ruin

Location
- Coordinates: 47°41′26″N 14°37′35″E

Site history
- Built: 1278 AD

Burgruine Gallenstein is a castle in Styria, Austria. The partially ruined Gallenstein Castle hosts many concerts and exhibitions as well as the annual Festival St. Gallen.

The noble family von Gallenstein resided at the castle at one point.

== See also ==
- List of castles in Austria
