= Velké Heraltice =

- Municipality
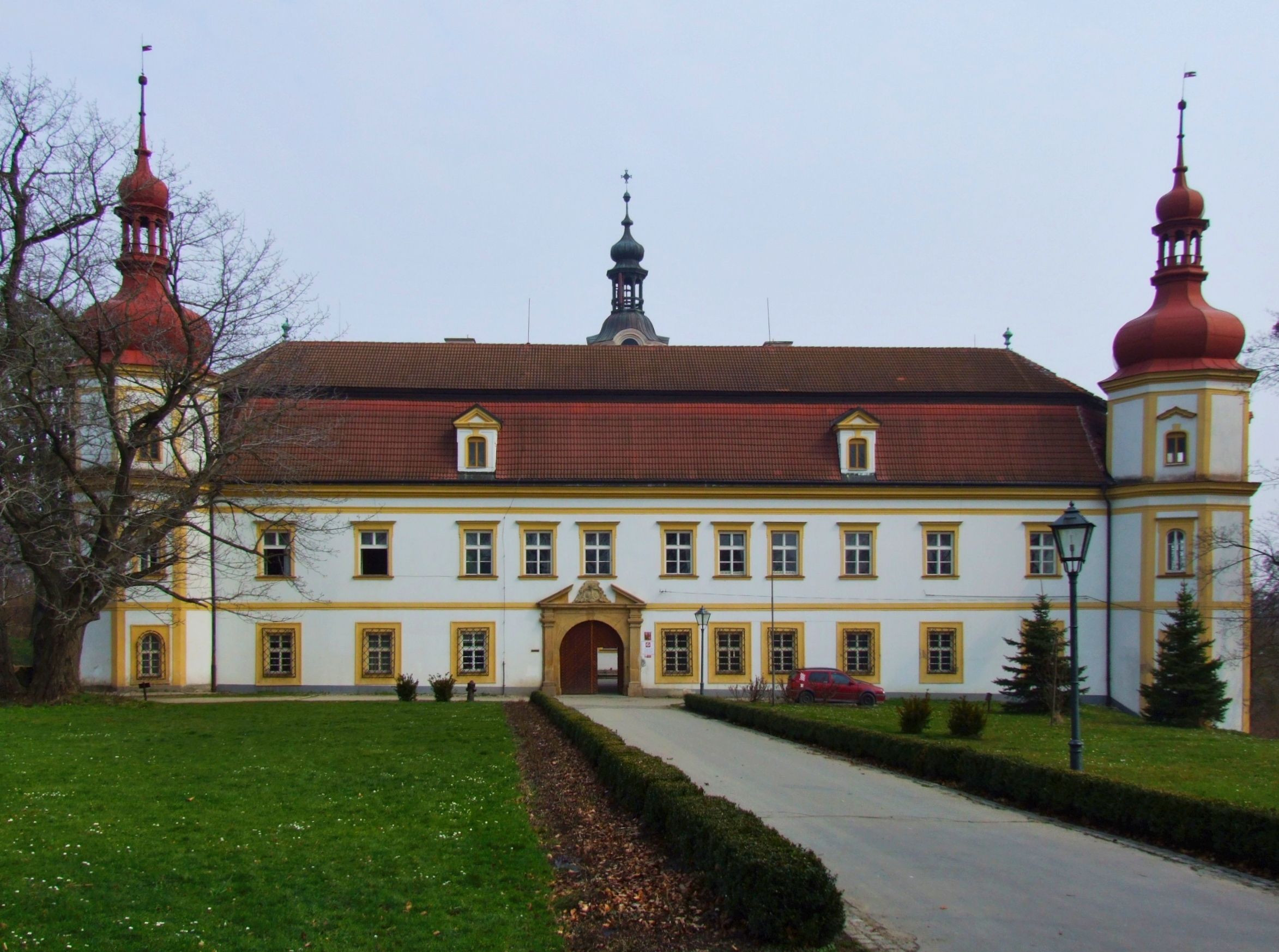
- Velké Heraltice Castle

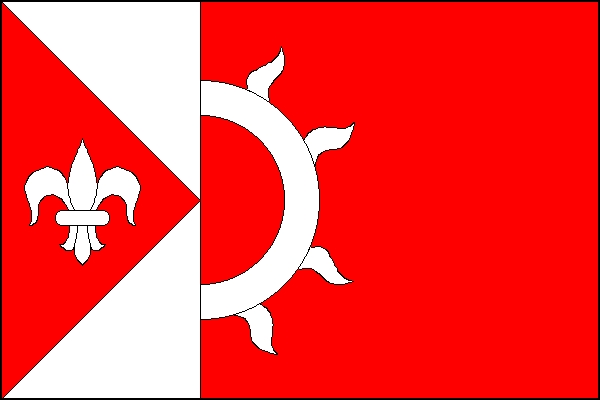
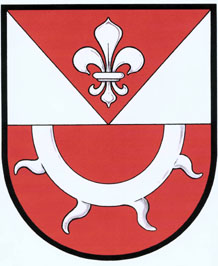
- Flag Coat of arms

- Location in the Czech Republic
- Coordinates: 49°58′30″N 17°43′44″E
- Country: Czech Republic
- Region: Moravian-Silesian
- District: Opava
- First mentioned: 1265

Area
  - Total: 39.32 km^{2} (15.18 sq mi)
- Elevation: 351 m (1,152 ft)

Population (2026-01-01)
  - Total: 1,629
  - Density: 41.43/km^{2} (107.3/sq mi)
- Time zone: UTC+1 (CET)
  - Summer (DST): UTC+2 (CEST)
- Postal code: 747 75
- Website: www.velkeheraltice.cz

Velké Heraltice (German: Großherrlitz) is a municipality and village in Opava District in the Moravian-Silesian Region of the Czech Republic. It has about 1,600 inhabitants.

== Administrative division ==
Velké Heraltice consists of five municipal parts (in brackets population according to the 2021 census):

- Velké Heraltice (986)
- Košetice (75)
- Malé Heraltice (189)
- Sádek (254)
- Tábor (77)

== Geography ==
Velké Heraltice is located about 12 kilometres (7 mi) northwest of Opava and 38 km (24 mi) northwest of Ostrava. It lies in the Nízký Jeseník range. The highest point is the Skalka hill at 506 m (1,660 ft) above sea level. The stream Heraltický potok flows through the municipality.

== History ==
The first written mention of Velké Heraltice is from 1265. Until 1525, it was owned by various less important noble families. From 1525 to 1595, the estate was owned by the Bruntálský of Vrbno family, then the owners often changed. In 1694–1767, Velké Heraltice was a property of the Cistercian monastery in Velehrad. In 1767, the estate was acquired again by the Bruntálský of Vrbno family.

In 1810, Velké Heraltice was bought by Count Mitrovský of Nemyšl. In 1849–1854, the Kinsky family held the estate. The last noble owners were the Counts of Bellegarde.

== Demographics ==
Historical population

Year	Pop.	±%
1869	2,494	—
1880	2,611	+4.7%
1890	2,583	−1.1%
1900	2,472	−4.3%
1910	2,396	−3.1%

Year	Pop.	±%
1921	2,345	−2.1%
1930	2,297	−2.0%
1950	1,511	−34.2%
1961	1,723	+14.0%
1970	1,592	−7.6%

Year	Pop.	±%
1980	1,717	+7.9%
1991	1,607	−6.4%
2001	1,611	+0.2%
2011	1,611	+0.0%
2021	1,581	−1.9%

Source: Censuses

== Transport ==
The I/11 road (the section from Opava to Bruntál) runs through the municipality.

== Sights ==
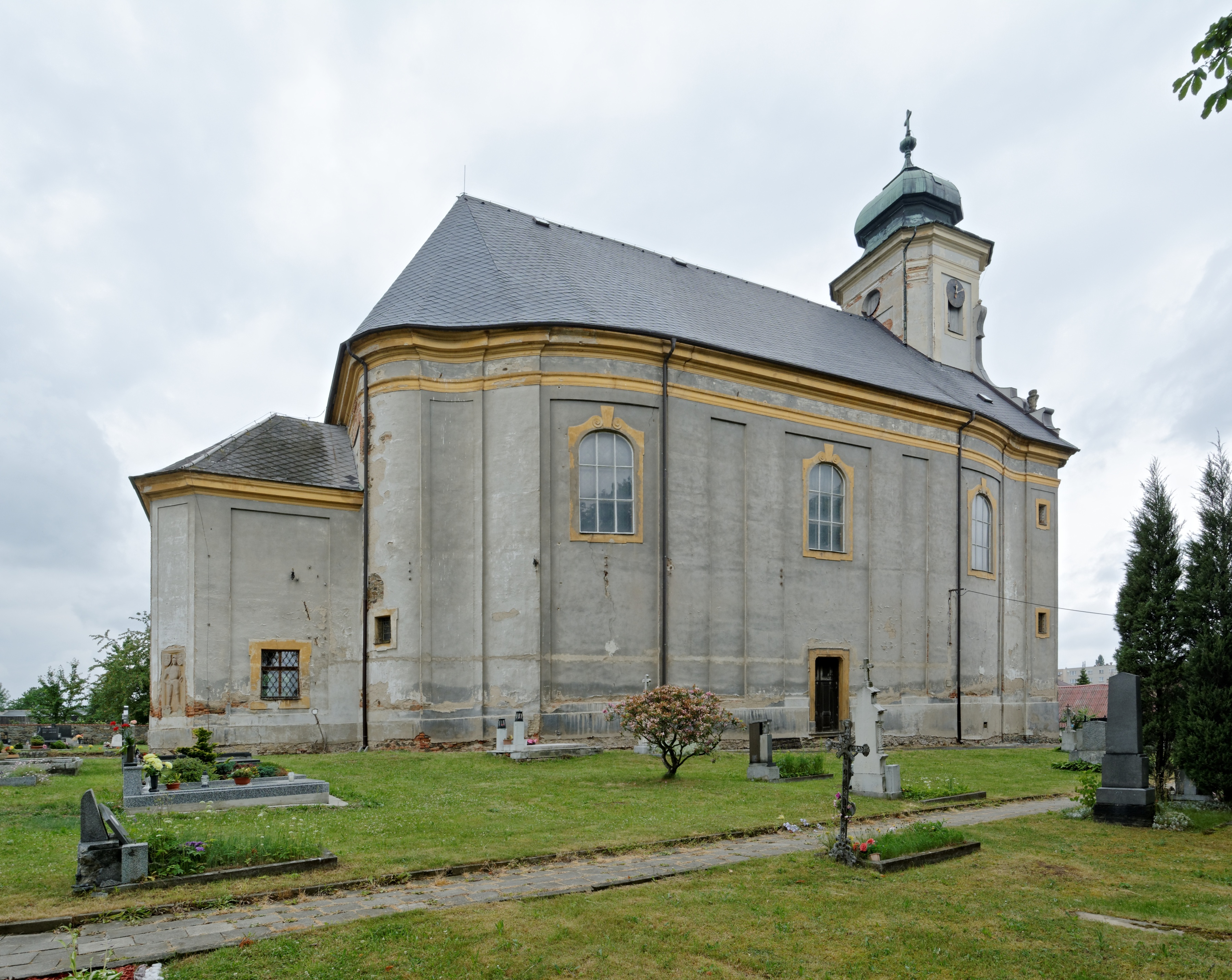
Church of the Immaculate Conception

The most important monument is the Velké Heraltice Castle. It had a complicated construction development. It was originally a Gothic castle from the 13th century, which was rebuilt into a Renaissance resident at the end of the 16th century. In the following centuries, significant Baroque reconstructions took place. The landscape park next to the castle was founded around 1830 and the orangery was built. Today the castle building houses a secondary school and children's home.

The Church of the Immaculate Conception was built in the Baroque style in 1751. The church complex, surrounded by a stone wall, includes a morgue, the Chapel of Our Lady of the Sorrows from the 18th century and the rectory from the 19th century.

The Church of Saint Bartholomew is located in Malé Heraltice. It is a Baroque church dating from 1769.

The Church of the Visitation of the Virgin Mary is located in Košetice. It was built in the Baroque style in 1770.

The Church of the Assumption of the Virgin Mary is located in Sádek. It was built in 1865.
