= Žužemberk Castle =

- Location within Slovenia
- 45.8301°N 14.9291°E
- Location: Žužemberk

History
- Built: 1295

en

Žužemberk (Seisenberg, Sosenberch) Castle stands in Žužemberk in Dry Carniola, Slovenia. It is situated on a terrace above the Krka River and constitutes the centre of the settlement.

== History ==
Considering the year "1000" carved into the entrance portal of the castle, the first fortification at the site was purportedly built by Wilhelm I, husband of saint Hemma and then governor of the Mark an der Saan. The castle was mentioned for the first time in 1295 when it was bought as "castrum Sausenberc in marchia Sclauica" from Heinzelin von Mahrenfels by the Gorizian count Albert I. In 1374, after the extinction of the Istrian branch of the counts of Gorizia, the castle became property of the Counts of Celje. After Ulrich II, Count of Celje, died in 1456 without heirs, the entire property of the House of Celje became property of the House of Habsburg, which also included Žužemberk Castle. In 1538, Emperor Ferdinand sold the estate to the Auersperg family (House of Turjak). It was bought by brothers Wolf Engelbert and George. In the 16th century, defence towers and a might bastion were built. In 1559, the castle was briefly captured by the illegitimate son of George of Turjak. Herbart of Turjak, whose army was near, recaptured the castle and dealt harshly with the attackers, throwing them over the walls and then carrying their bodies away to the forest to be devoured by wild animals. In 1575, a domesticated female bear killed the wife of Ivan of Turjak, Anna von Eck, in the castle courtyard. A linden tree was planted in the courtyard in remembrance of this tragic event. It stood for 424 years (it was cut down in 1999).

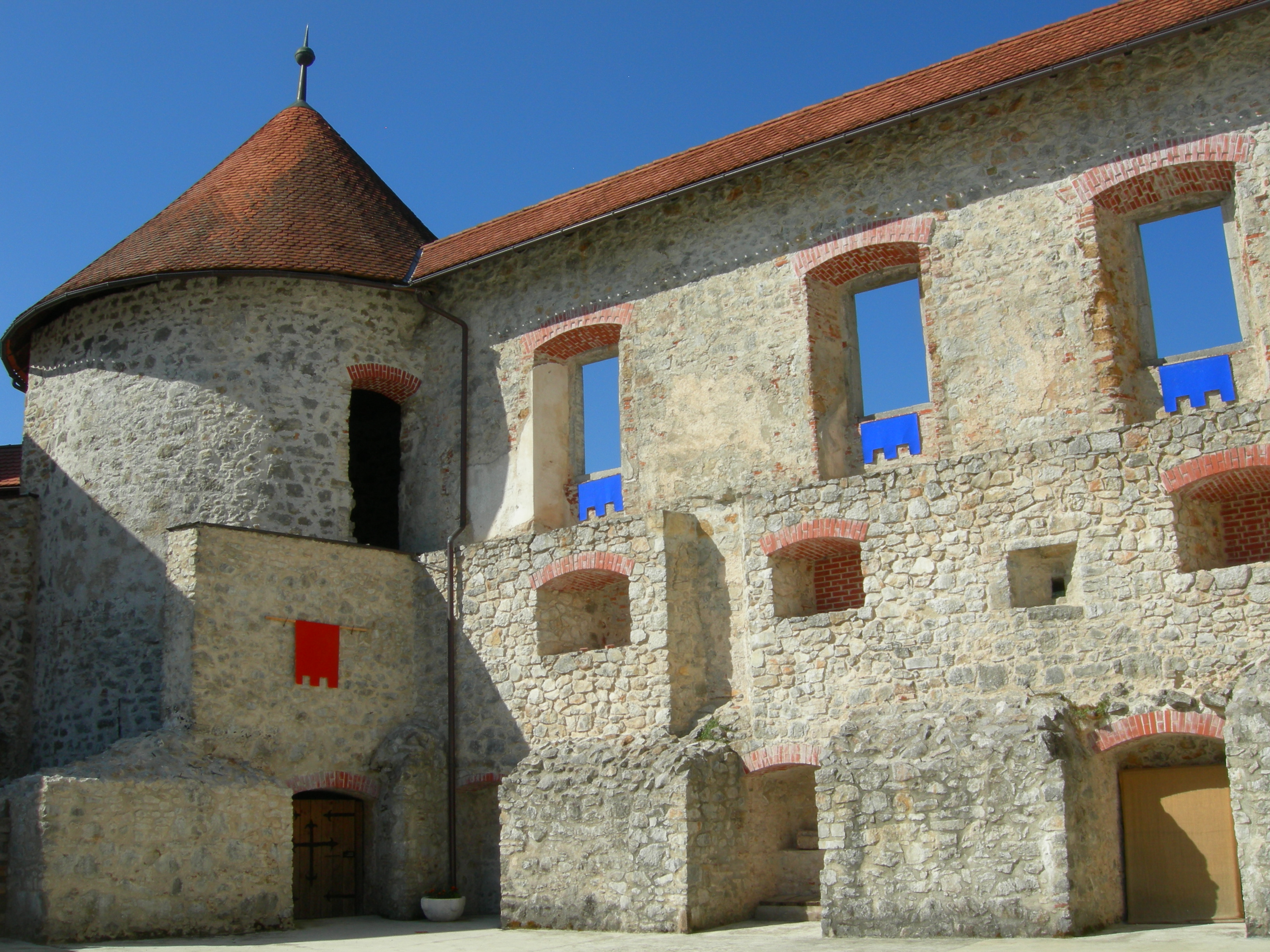
Courtyard of the castle

Prince Johann Weikhard of Auersperg, who was a councillor and the first minister in the Habsburg monarchy (as well as the tutor of Emperor Ferdinand III), established a non-transferable hereditary estate (primogeniture fideicommissum). Žužemberk Castle was property of the house of Auersperg until World War II. The castle also housed a district court and prisons. When the court withdrew from the castle in 1893, it slowly began to fall into disrepair. During World War II, it was occupied by an Italian garrison, and after Italy's surrender, it was briefly taken over by partisans. In 1944, a Home Guard garrison took up residence in the castle, which led to it being bombed by Allied aircraft in 1945, leaving only the skeleton of the walls standing. The gradual restoration of the castle began in the 1960s, and since 1996, the so-called "Medieval Days" and other cultural events have been held there during the summer.

== Coat of arms ==
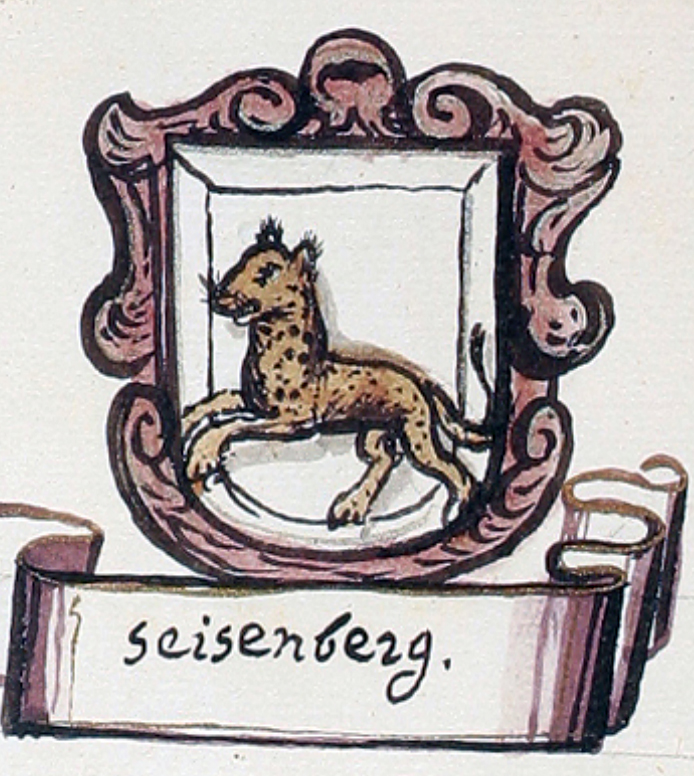
The coat of arms of Žužemberk in the Great Book of Coats of Arms, authored by Johann Weikhard von Valvasor

The (presumed) green tincture depicts a golden lion rampant. The lion represents strength, anger, honor, and confronting one's fears. Its golden metal tincture represents majesty, prestige, supremacy, dignity, and wealth, and is awarded for special merits. The rampant pose represents readiness for battle. The green shield represents freedom, joy, hope, and health.

== See also ==
- List of castles in Slovenia
