= Horní Životice =

- Municipality
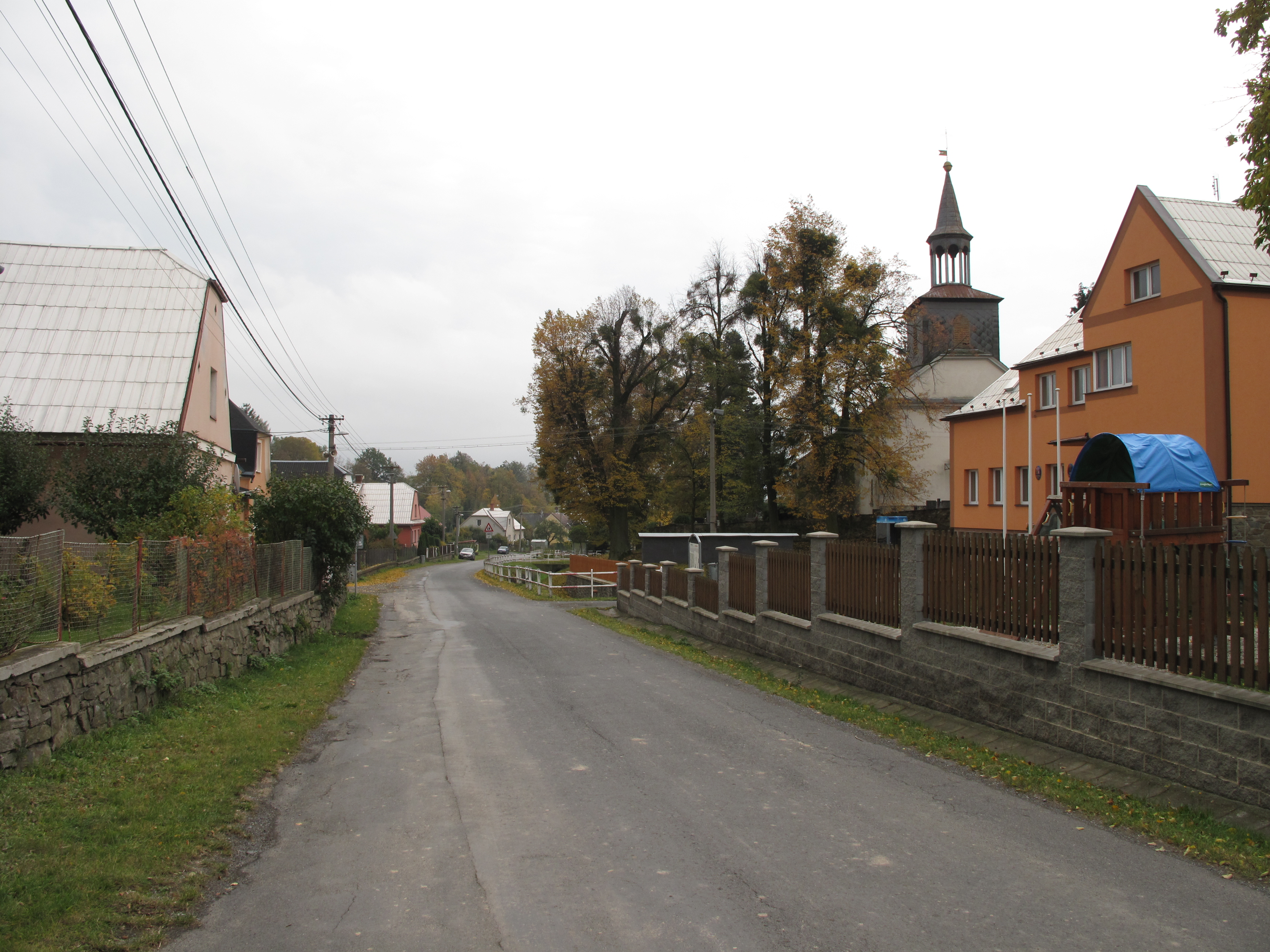
- Centre of Horní Životice

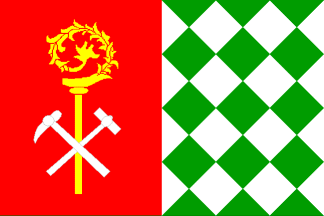
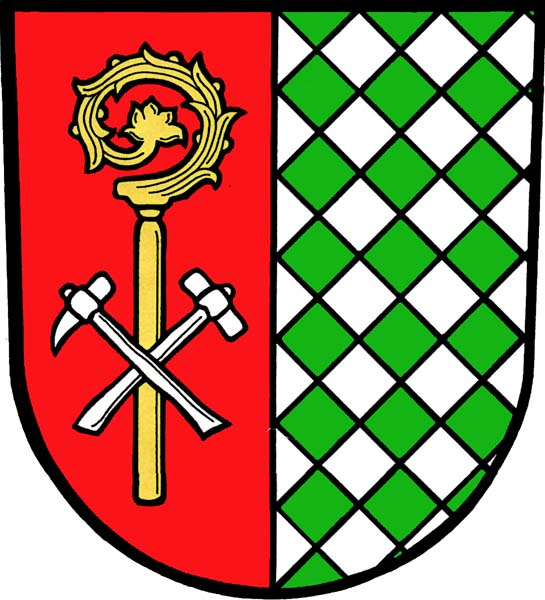
- Flag Coat of arms

- Location in the Czech Republic
- Coordinates: 49°58′8″N 17°38′27″E
- Country: Czech Republic
- Region: Moravian-Silesian
- District: Bruntál
- First mentioned: 1265

Area
  - Total: 11.40 km^{2} (4.40 sq mi)
- Elevation: 470 m (1,540 ft)

Population (2026-01-01)
  - Total: 337
  - Density: 29.6/km^{2} (76.6/sq mi)
- Time zone: UTC+1 (CET)
  - Summer (DST): UTC+2 (CEST)
- Postal code: 793 12
- Website: www.hornizivotice.cz

Horní Životice (German: Seitendorf) is a municipality and village in Bruntál District in the Moravian-Silesian Region of the Czech Republic. It has about 300 inhabitants.

== Geography ==
Horní Životice is located about 13 kilometres (8 mi) east of Bruntál and 18 km (11 mi) west of Opava. It lies in the Nízký Jeseník range. The highest point is the hill Kozinec at 596 m (1,955 ft) above sea level. The stream Heřmanický potok flows through the municipality.

== History ==
The first written mention of Horní Životice is from 1265, when the village was property of the monastery in Velehrad. From the early 15th century, it was a separate estate, owned by various lower noblemen. In 1531, Horní Životice was acquired by Lords of Vrbno and annexed to the Velké Heraltice estate. It remained so until the establishment of an independent municipality in the mid-19th century.

In the 19th century, industry developed in the village. A distillery, a mill and a dairy were founded here. Iron ore began to be mined in the vicinity of the village.

Until 1945, the municipality was predominantly ethnically German. After World War II, the German-speaking population was expelled and the village was partially repopulated by Czechs.

== Demographics ==
Historical population

Year	Pop.	±%
1869	843	—
1880	807	−4.3%
1890	831	+3.0%
1900	786	−5.4%
1910	785	−0.1%

Year	Pop.	±%
1921	737	−6.1%
1930	726	−1.5%
1950	432	−40.5%
1961	418	−3.2%
1970	421	+0.7%

Year	Pop.	±%
1980	349	−17.1%
1991	327	−6.3%
2001	335	+2.4%
2011	335	+0.0%
2021	329	−1.8%

Source: Censuses

== Transport ==
The I/11 road (the section from Opava to Bruntál) runs through the municipality.

== Sights ==
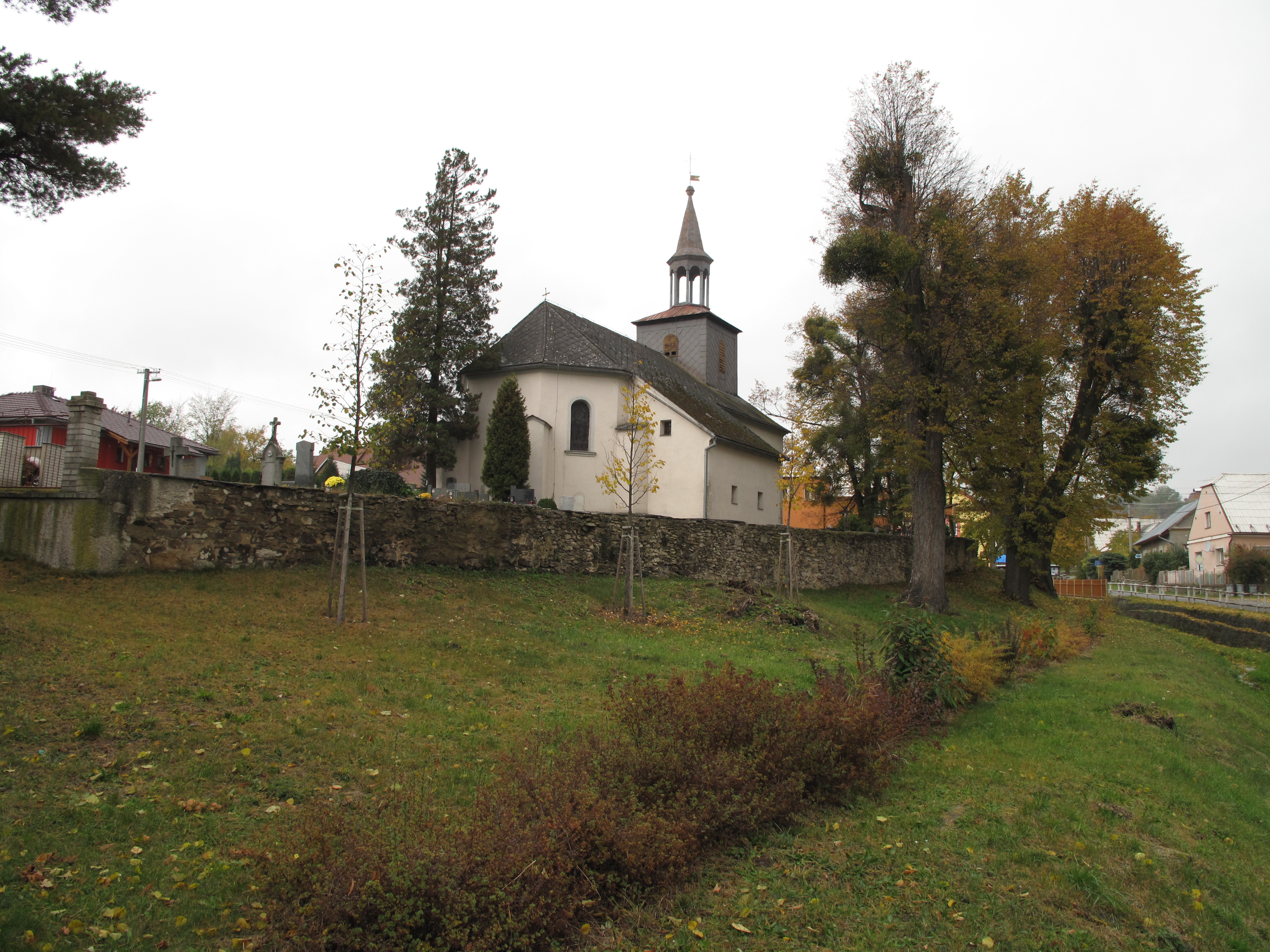
Church of Saint Nicholas

The main landmark of Horní Životice is the Church of Saint Nicholas. It is a modern church, built in the second half of the 20th century.

The only protected cultural monument in the municipality is a wooden windmill. Built in 1840, it was in operation until 1945. Most of the technical equipment has been preserved.
