= Gall von Gallenstein =

European noble family

House of Gallenstein
- Founded: Unknown
- Titles: Count; Freiherr

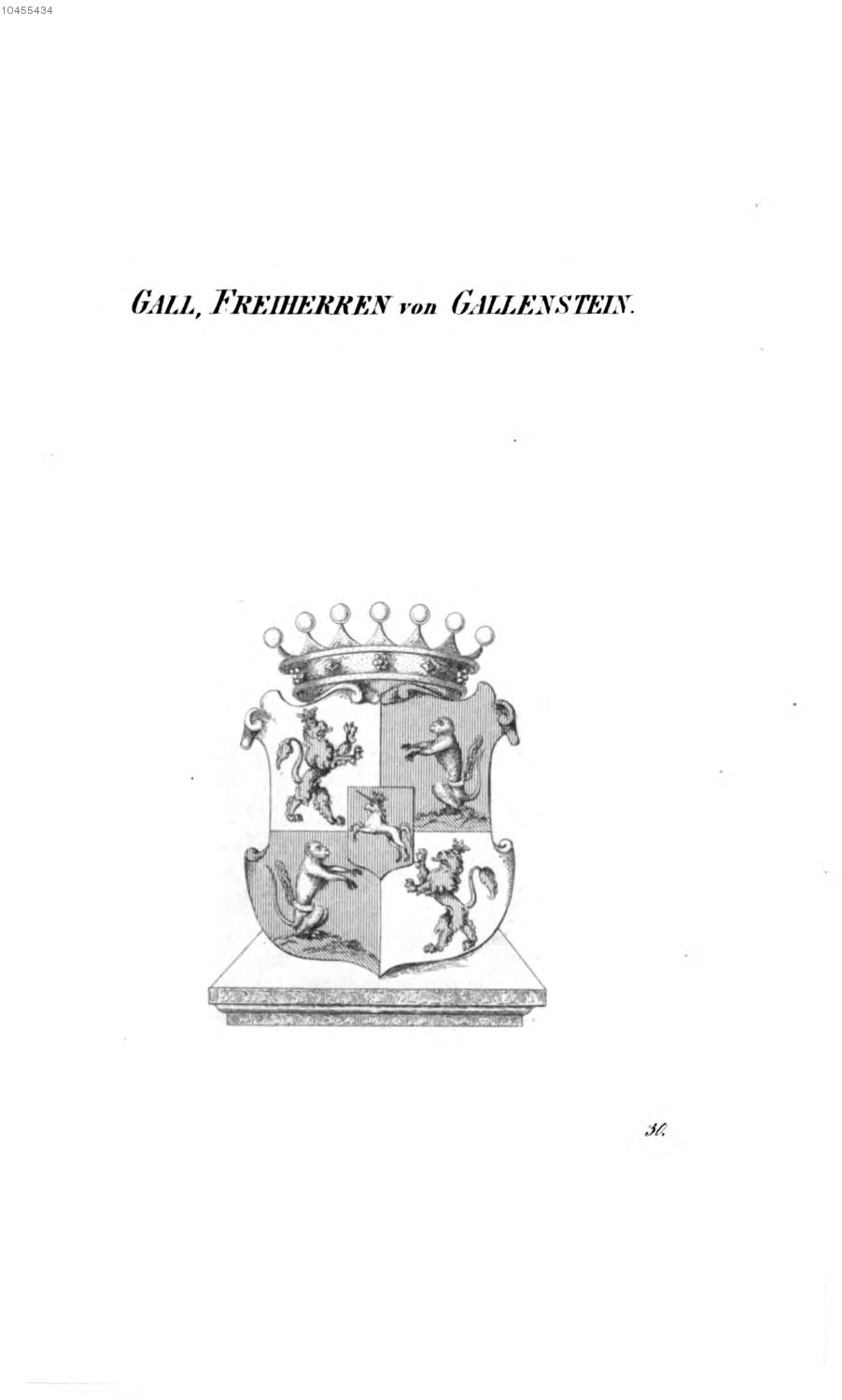
Coat of arms of Gall, Freiherren von Gallenstein

The noble family Gall von Gallenstein was a noble family and is best known for their castle of the same name. Originally nobles from Alsace-Lorraine, the family owned castles in medieval Europe.

== Castles ==
The Gall von Gallensteins owned Burgruine Gallenstein in Styria for a long time, as well as Brežice Castle in Slovenia. They also owned Finkenegg Castle and Asparn Castle briefly.

== Family ==
The field marshal of the Habsburg War Chamber in 1635 was a Count von Gallenstein.

The mother of Sigismund von Schrattenbach, Archbishop of Salzburg, was Maria Theresa, widowed baroness Gall von Gallenstein.

The mother of Johann Weikhard von Auersperg, an Austrian minister and Prince of Auersperg, was Sidonia Gall von Gallenstein.

== Etymology ==
Gallenstein is likely a topographic name referring to Sankt Gallen and Burg Gallenstein, the ancestral lands of the von Gallensteins.
