= Stranska Vas (Grosuplje) =

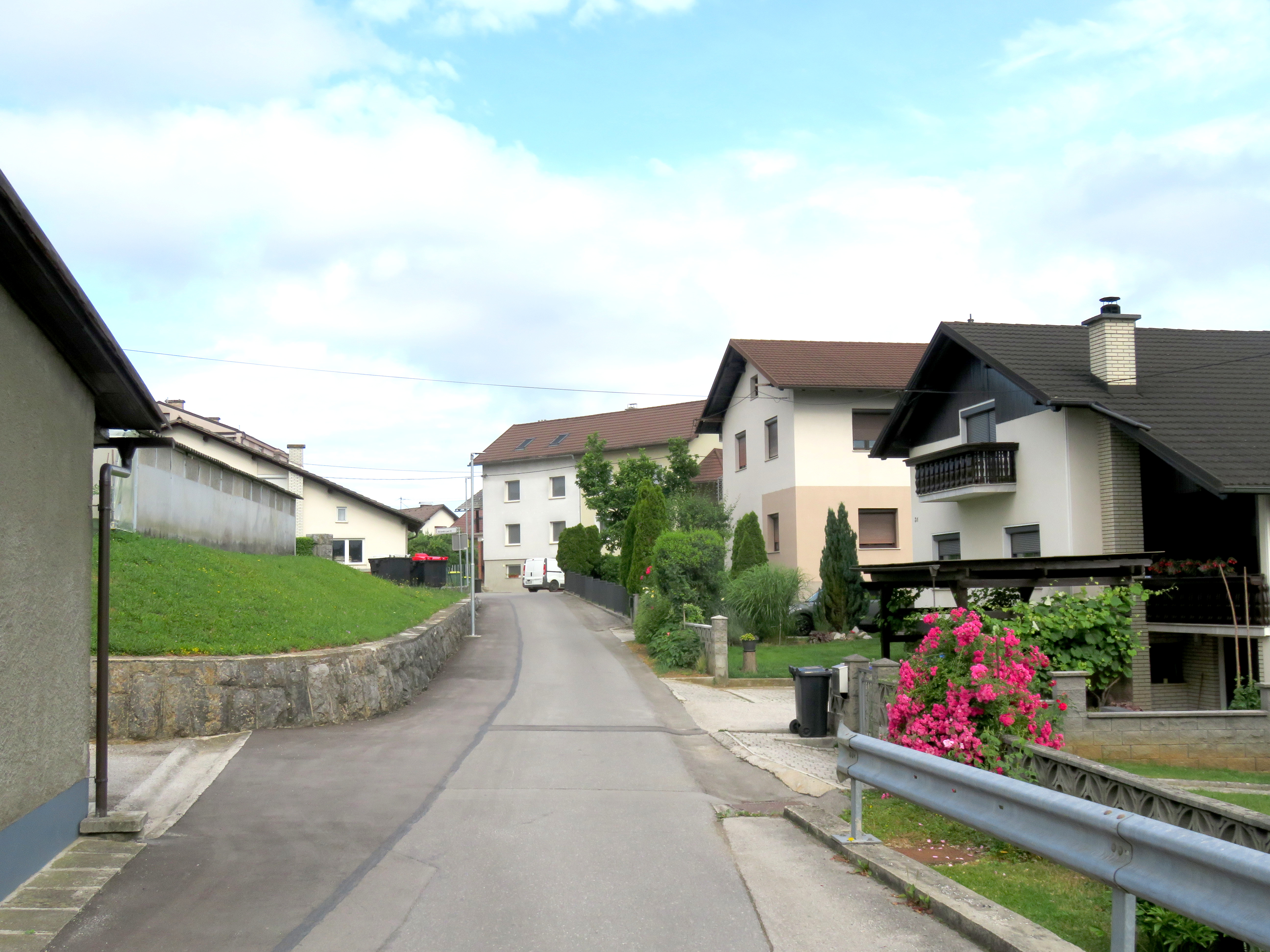

- Location in Slovenia
- Coordinates: 45°57′32.76″N 14°39′5.03″E
- Country: Slovenia
- Traditional region: Lower Carniola
- Statistical region: Central Slovenia
- Municipality: Grosuplje
- Elevation: 340 m (1,120 ft)

Stranska Vas (pronounced [ˈstɾaːnska ˈʋaːs]; Slovene: Stranska vas, German: Streindorf) is a formerly independent settlement in the northwest part of the town of Grosuplje in central Slovenia. It belongs to the Municipality of Grosuplje. It is part of the traditional region of Lower Carniola and is now included with the rest of the municipality in the Central Slovenia Statistical Region.

== Geography ==
Stranska Vas was formerly connected to Grosuplje by a road across a steep slope at the base of Brinje Hill (Slovene: Brinjski hrib, 409 m). Over time, this slope has been leveled. The soil is mostly sandy, partially loamy, and fertile.

== Name ==
Stranska Vas was mentioned in 1305 as Stransdorf (and as Drandorf in 1313, Streindorf in 1631, Stranſka vaſ in 1687, and Seitendorf in 1832). The name literally means 'village on the side' and is derived from the Slovene word stran 'side', referring to the location of the settlement on the slope of a hill. In the past it was known as Streindorf in German.

== History ==
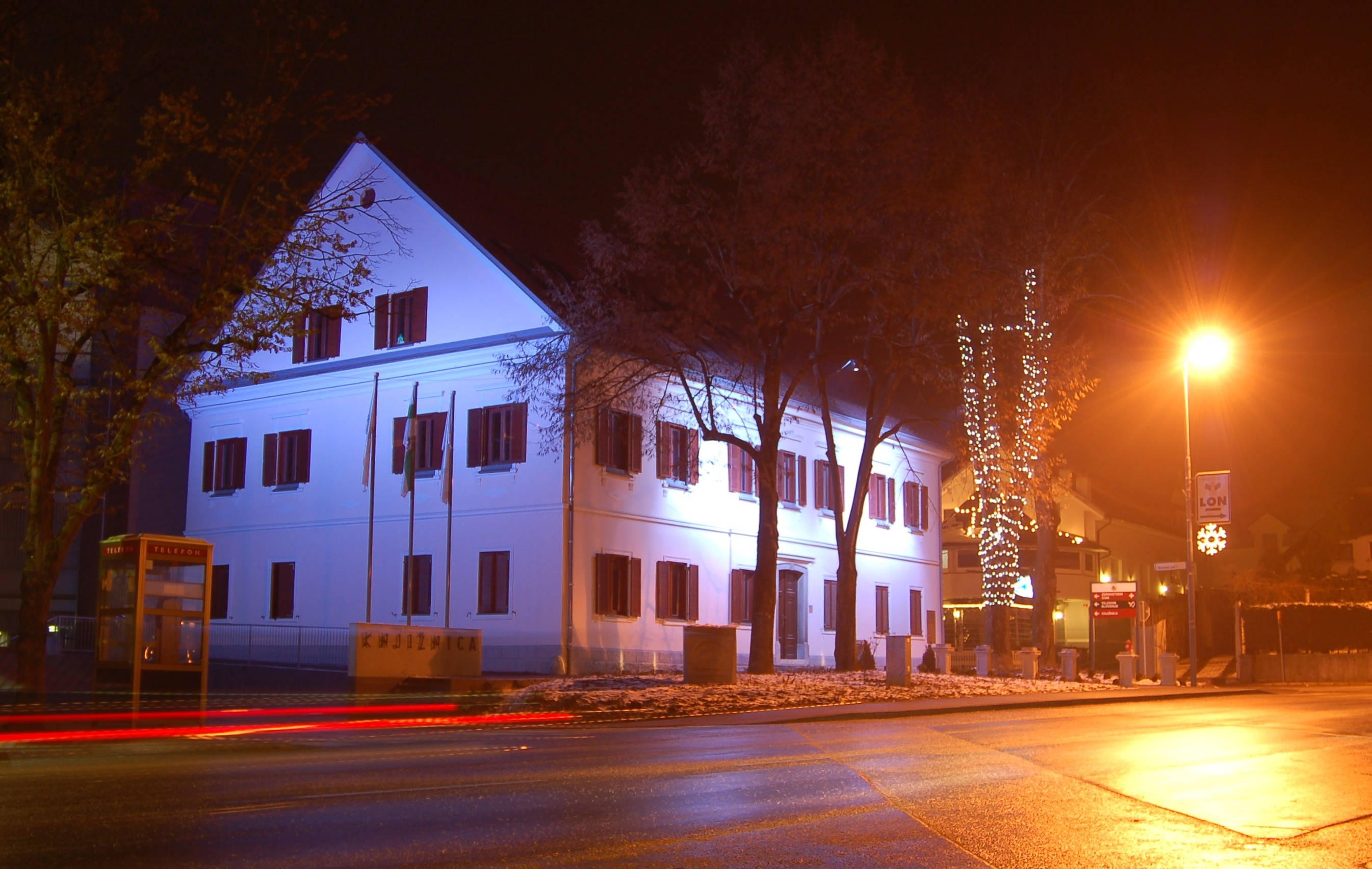
The Koščak House at 15 Adamič Street (Adamičeva ulica), one of the oldest houses in Grosuplje, now housing the town library

The economy of Stranska Vas was traditionally tied to agriculture; raising hogs for the Ljubljana market and producing honey (especially at the Franc Košak farm) were particularly important. Milling and woodworking were also important commercial activities. Stranska Vas was annexed by the village of Brvace and the town of Grosuplje in 1953, ending its existence as an independent settlement. After annexation, administrative and commercial facilities for Grosuplje were built in Stranska Vas.

== Brinje Manor ==
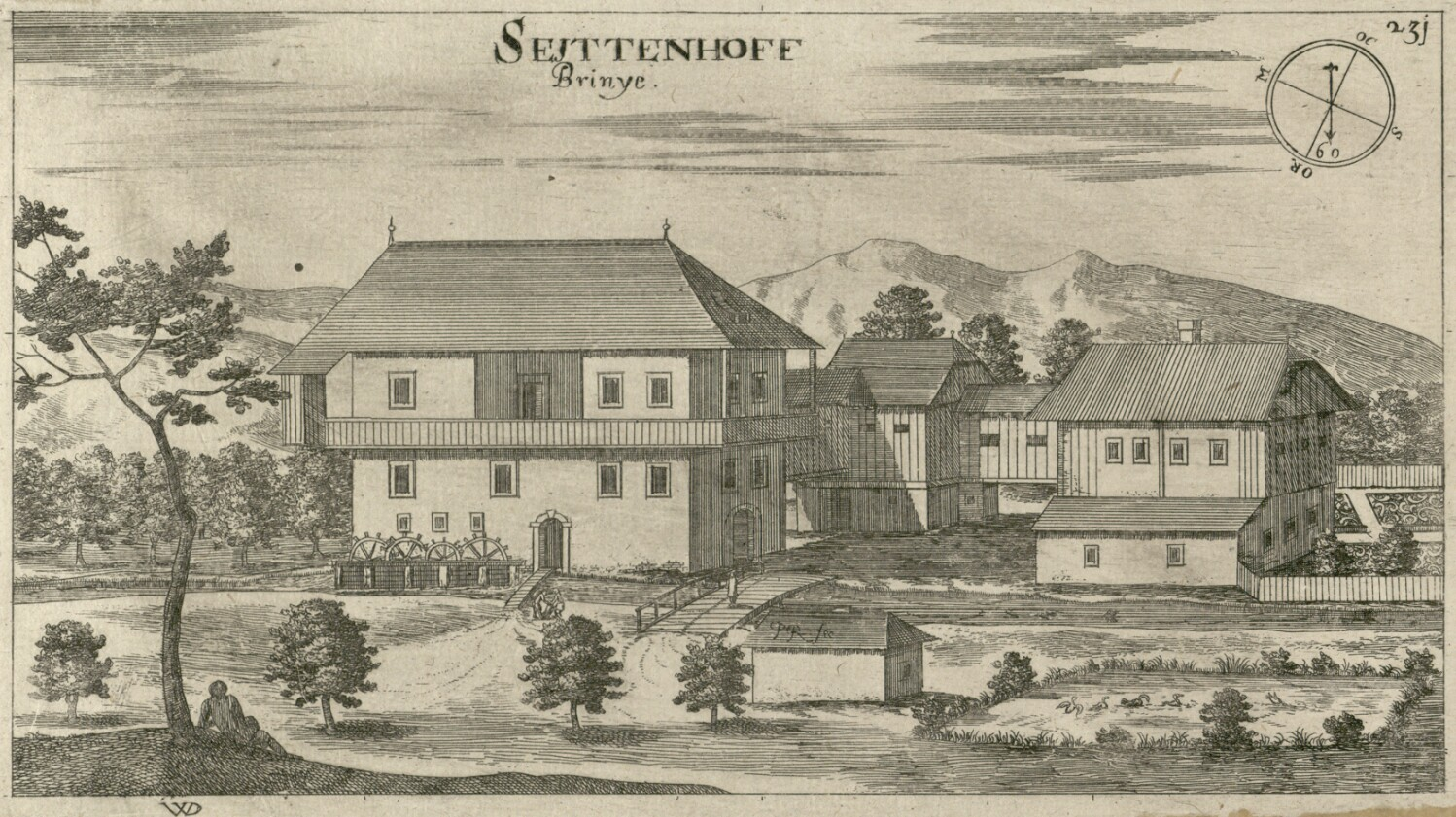
Brinje Manor

Brinje Manor (Slovene: gradič Brinje, German: Seitenhof) was built by the Lamberg noble family from Boštanj Castle in the early 16th century. It came under the ownership of the Čušperks in the 17th century, and in the 20th century it belonged to the Valentinčič family. After the Second World War, the manor was converted into apartments.
