= Životice (Plzeň-South District) =

- Municipality
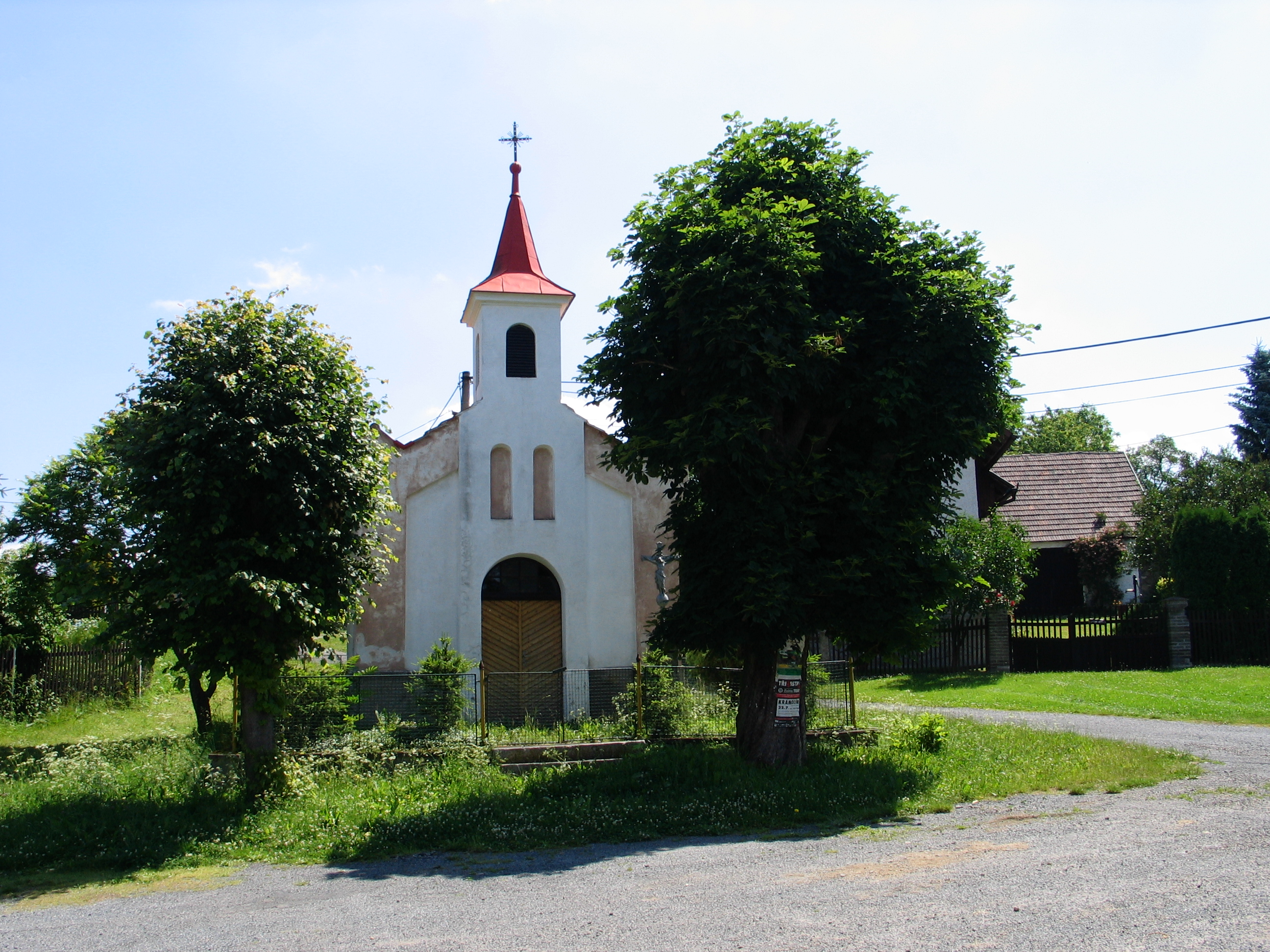
- Chapel in the centre of Životice

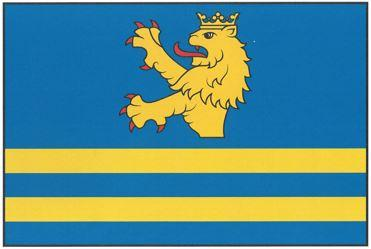
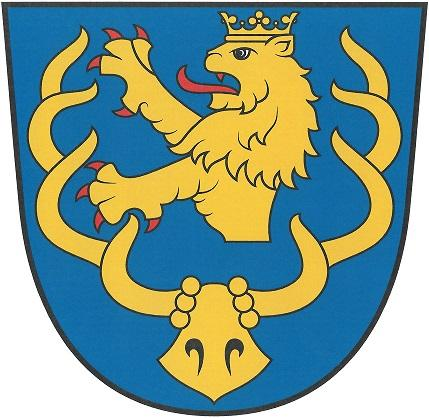
- Flag Coat of arms

- Location in the Czech Republic
- Coordinates: 49°28′0″N 13°41′7″E
- Country: Czech Republic
- Region: Plzeň
- District: Plzeň-South
- First mentioned: 1425

Area
  - Total: 4.30 km^{2} (1.66 sq mi)
- Elevation: 508 m (1,667 ft)

Population (2026-01-01)
  - Total: 56
  - Density: 13/km^{2} (34/sq mi)
- Time zone: UTC+1 (CET)
  - Summer (DST): UTC+2 (CEST)
- Postal code: 335 44
- Website: www.obec-zivotice.cz

Životice is a municipality and village in Plzeň-South District in the Plzeň Region of the Czech Republic. It has about 60 inhabitants.

Životice lies approximately 39 kilometres (24 mi) south-east of Plzeň and 87 km (54 mi) south-west of Prague.

== Demographics ==
Historical population
Year	Pop.	±%
1869	251	—
1880	213	−15.1%
1890	237	+11.3%
1900	214	−9.7%
1910	217	+1.4%
1921	204	−6.0%
1930	200	−2.0%
1950	170	−15.0%
1961	159	−6.5%
1970	127	−20.1%
1980	119	−6.3%
1991	91	−23.5%
2001	55	−39.6%
2011	53	−3.6%
2021	53	+0.0%
Source: Censuses
