= Stransky (surname) =

Stransky, Stránský or Stranski (Bulgarian: Странски) is a Slavic masculine surname, its feminine counterpart is Stranska or Stránská. Notable people with the surname include:

- Adolf Stránský (1855–1931), Czechoslovak politician
- Georgi Stranski (1847–1904), Bulgarian physician and politician
- Ivan Stranski (1897–1979), Bulgarian physical chemist
- Jan Stránský (born 1990), Czech ice hockey player
- Jaroslav Stránský (1899–1945), Czech ice hockey player
- Jiří Stránský (1931–2019), Czech author, playwright, and translator
- Joel Stransky (born 1967), South African rugby union rugby player
- Josef Stránský (1872–1936), Czech conductor, composer, and art collector
- Mara Stransky (born 1999), Australian sailor
- Matěj Stránský (born 1993), Czech ice hockey player
- Vladan Stransky (born 1973), Australian ice hockey player
- Vojtěch Stránský (born 2003), Czech footballer
