= Pischelsdorf am Engelbach =

- Municipality
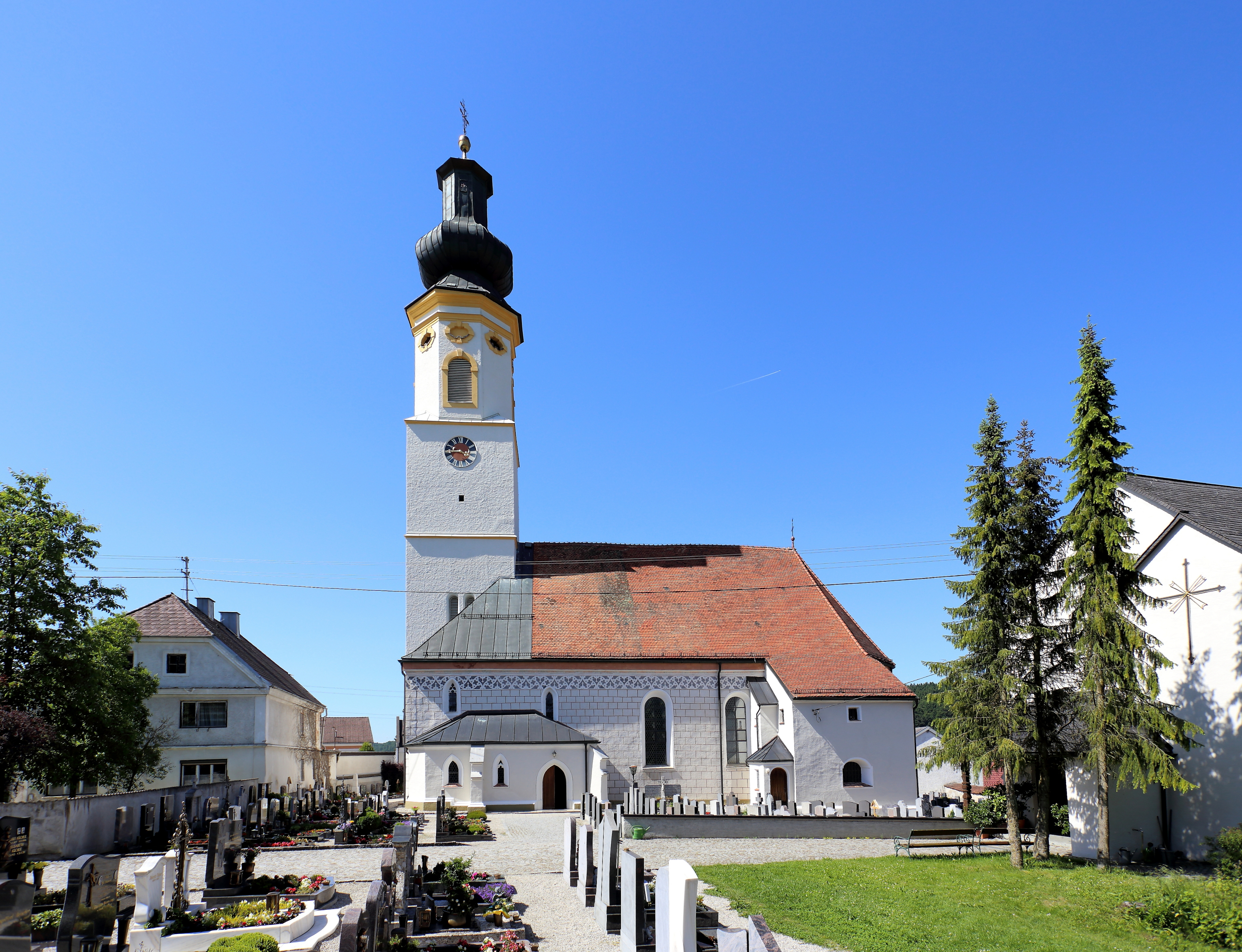

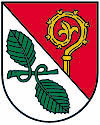
- Coat of arms

- Location within Austria
- Coordinates: 48°07′50″N 13°05′00″E
- Country: Austria
- State: Upper Austria
- District: Braunau am Inn

Government
  - Mayor: Josef Rehrl jun. (ÖVP)

Area
  - Total: 32.82 km^{2} (12.67 sq mi)
- Elevation: 433 m (1,421 ft)

Population (2015)
  - Total: 1,662
  - Density: 50.64/km^{2} (131.2/sq mi)
- Time zone: UTC+1 (CET)
  - Summer (DST): UTC+2 (CEST)
- Postal code: 5233
- Area code: 07742
- Vehicle registration: BR
- Website: www.pischelsdorf.ooe.gv.at

Pischelsdorf am Engelbach is a municipality in the district of Braunau am Inn in the Austrian state of Upper Austria.

== Geography ==
Pischelsdorf lies in the Innviertel. About 31 percent of the municipality is forest and 65 percent farmland.
