= Životice u Nového Jičína =

- Municipality
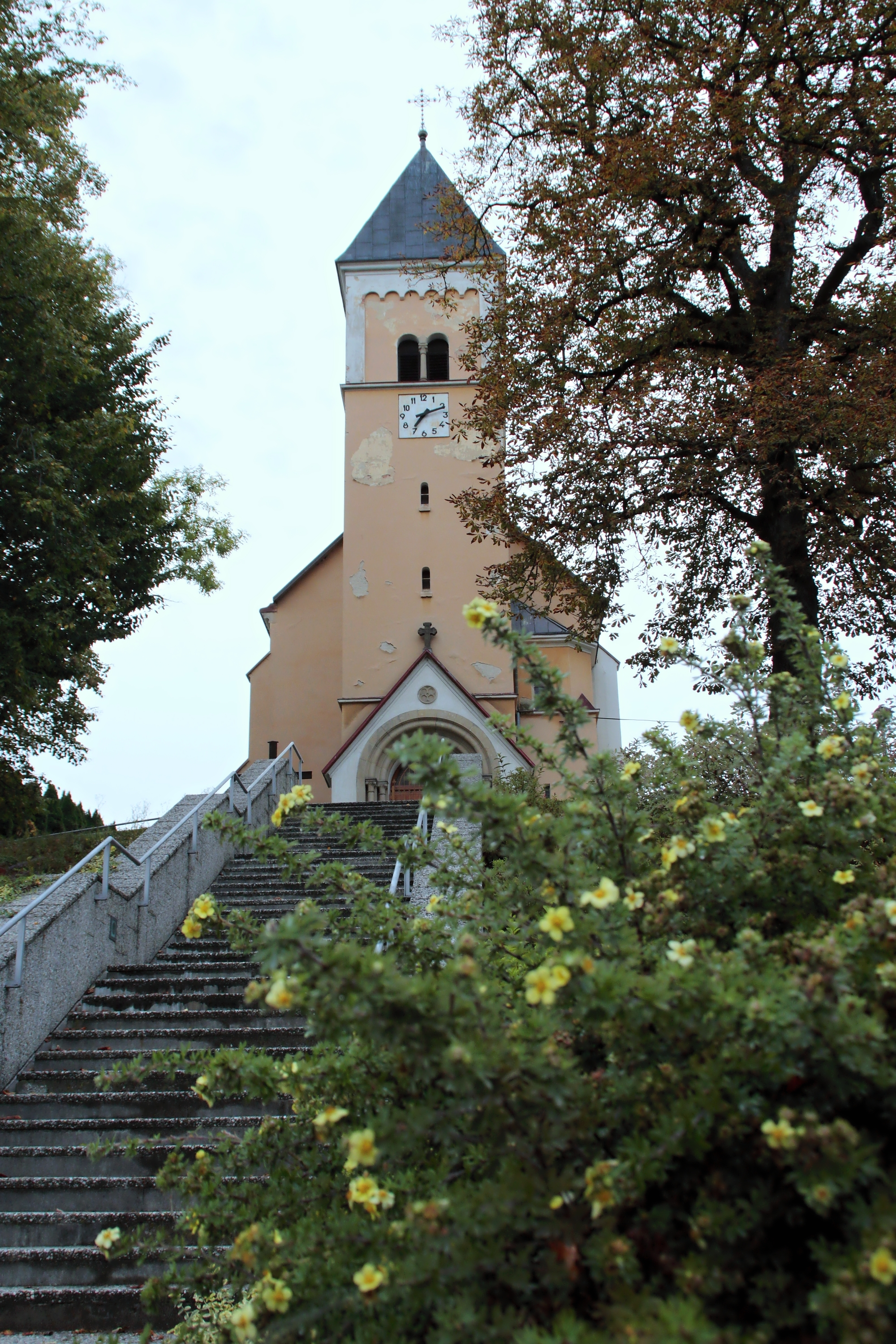
- Church of Saint John the Baptist

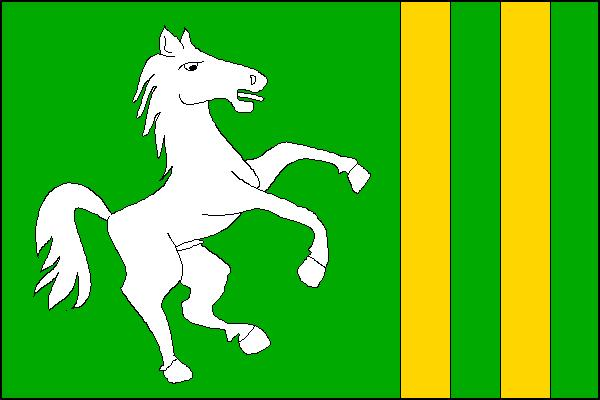
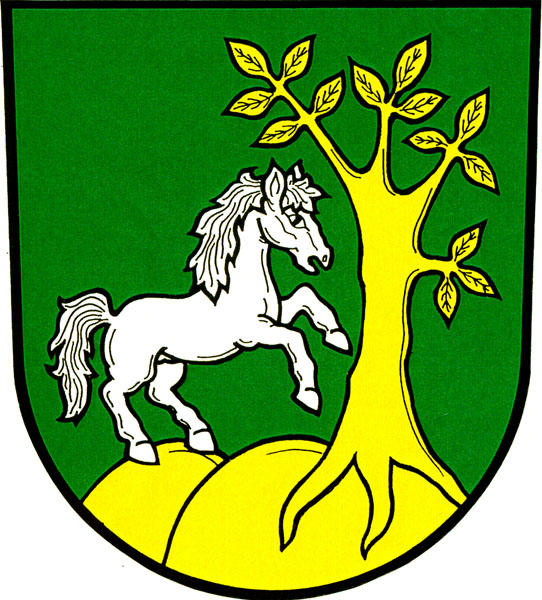
- Flag Coat of arms

- Location in the Czech Republic
- Coordinates: 49°33′26″N 18°2′50″E
- Country: Czech Republic
- Region: Moravian-Silesian
- District: Nový Jičín
- First mentioned: 1411

Area
  - Total: 9.07 km^{2} (3.50 sq mi)
- Elevation: 325 m (1,066 ft)

Population (2026-01-01)
  - Total: 651
  - Density: 71.8/km^{2} (186/sq mi)
- Time zone: UTC+1 (CET)
  - Summer (DST): UTC+2 (CEST)
- Postal code: 742 72
- Website: www.zivoticeunj.cz

Životice u Nového Jičína (German: Seitendorf) is a municipality and village in Nový Jičín District in the Moravian-Silesian Region of the Czech Republic. It has about 700 inhabitants.

== Demographics ==
Historical population
Year	Pop.	±%
1869	722	—
1880	755	+4.6%
1890	857	+13.5%
1900	835	−2.6%
1910	857	+2.6%
1921	791	−7.7%
1930	837	+5.8%
1950	577	−31.1%
1961	615	+6.6%
1970	564	−8.3%
1980	569	+0.9%
1991	549	−3.5%
2001	561	+2.2%
2011	579	+3.2%
2021	609	+5.2%
Source: Censuses
