= Stranska Vas ob Višnjici =

Stranska Vas ob Višnjici Stranska Vas (until 1953)
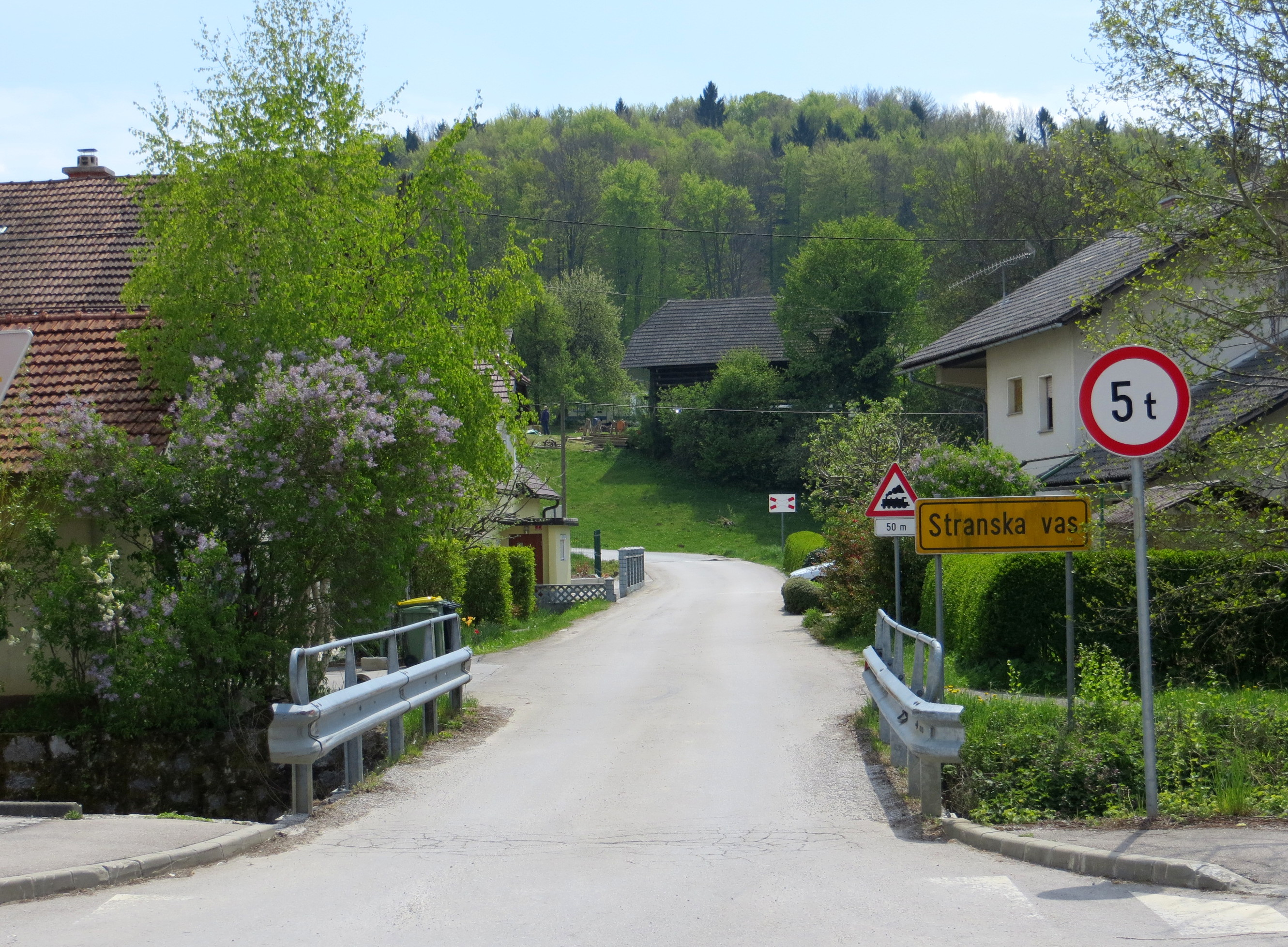

- Location in Slovenia
- Coordinates: 45°56′9.67″N 14°47′17.25″E
- Country: Slovenia
- Traditional region: Lower Carniola
- Statistical region: Central Slovenia
- Municipality: Ivančna Gorica

Area
  - Total: 0.54 km^{2} (0.21 sq mi)
- Elevation: 336.7 m (1,105 ft)

Population (2002)
  - Total: 57

Stranska Vas ob Višnjici (pronounced [ˈstɾaːnska ˈʋaːs ɔb ˈʋiːʃnjitsi]; Slovene: Stranska vas ob Višnjici, German: Seitendorf) is a small settlement on Višnjica Creek west of Ivančna Gorica in central Slovenia. The A2 Slovenian motorway crosses the settlement's territory just south of the village core. The area is part of the historical region of Lower Carniola. The municipality is now included in the Central Slovenia Statistical Region.

== Name ==
The name of the settlement was changed from Stranska vas to Stranska vas ob Višnjici in 1953. Previously, the German name was Seitendorf.
