= Hladké Životice =

- Municipality
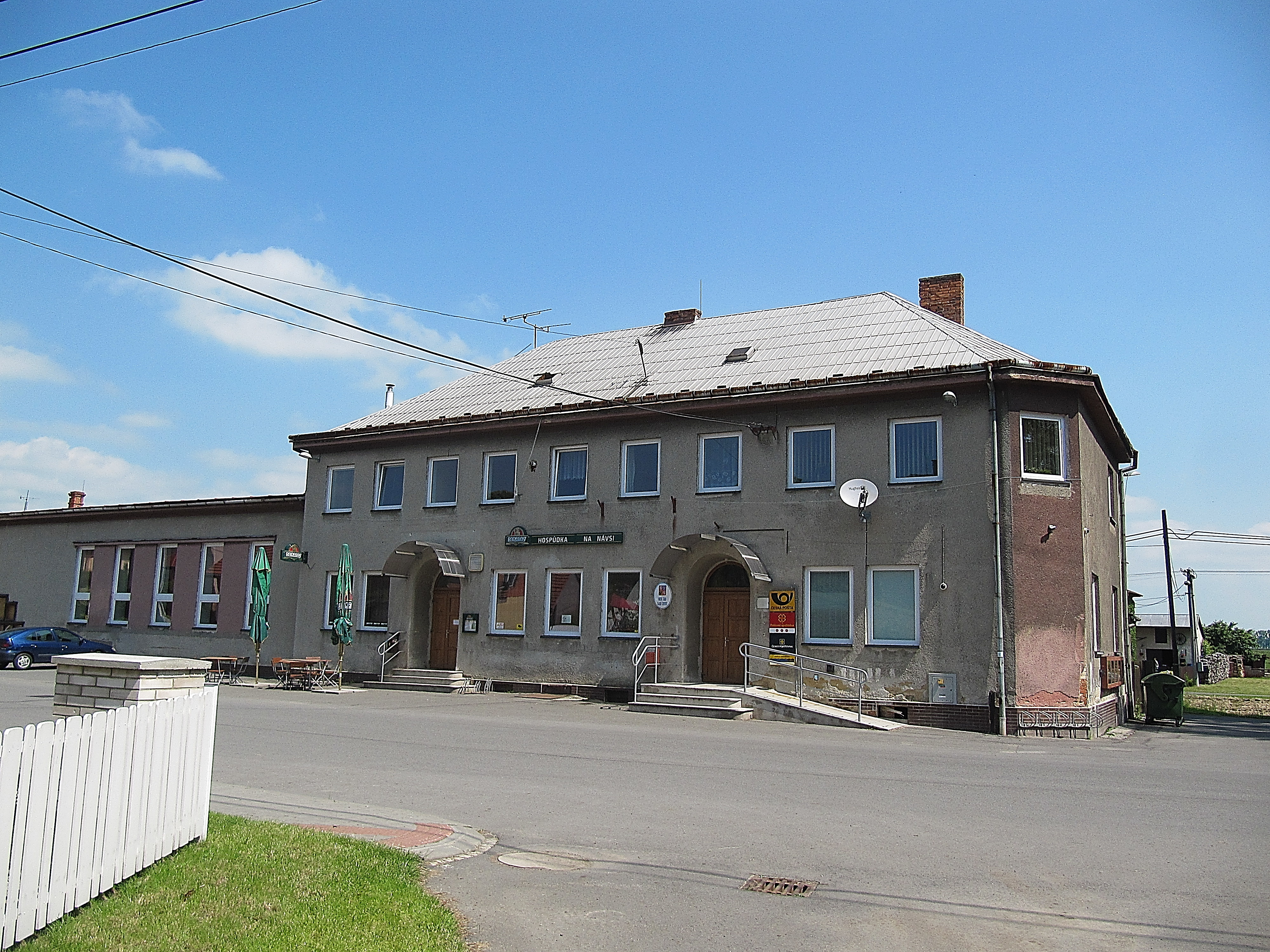
- Municipal office

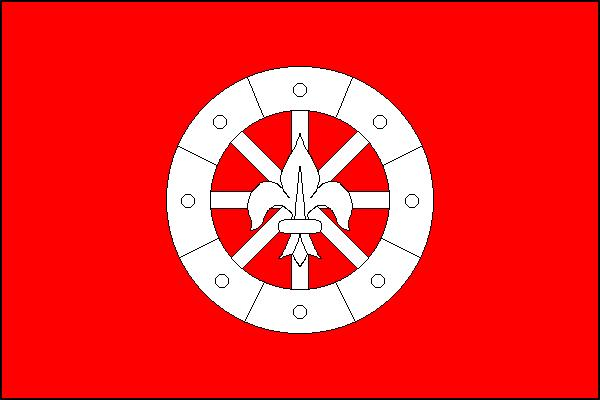
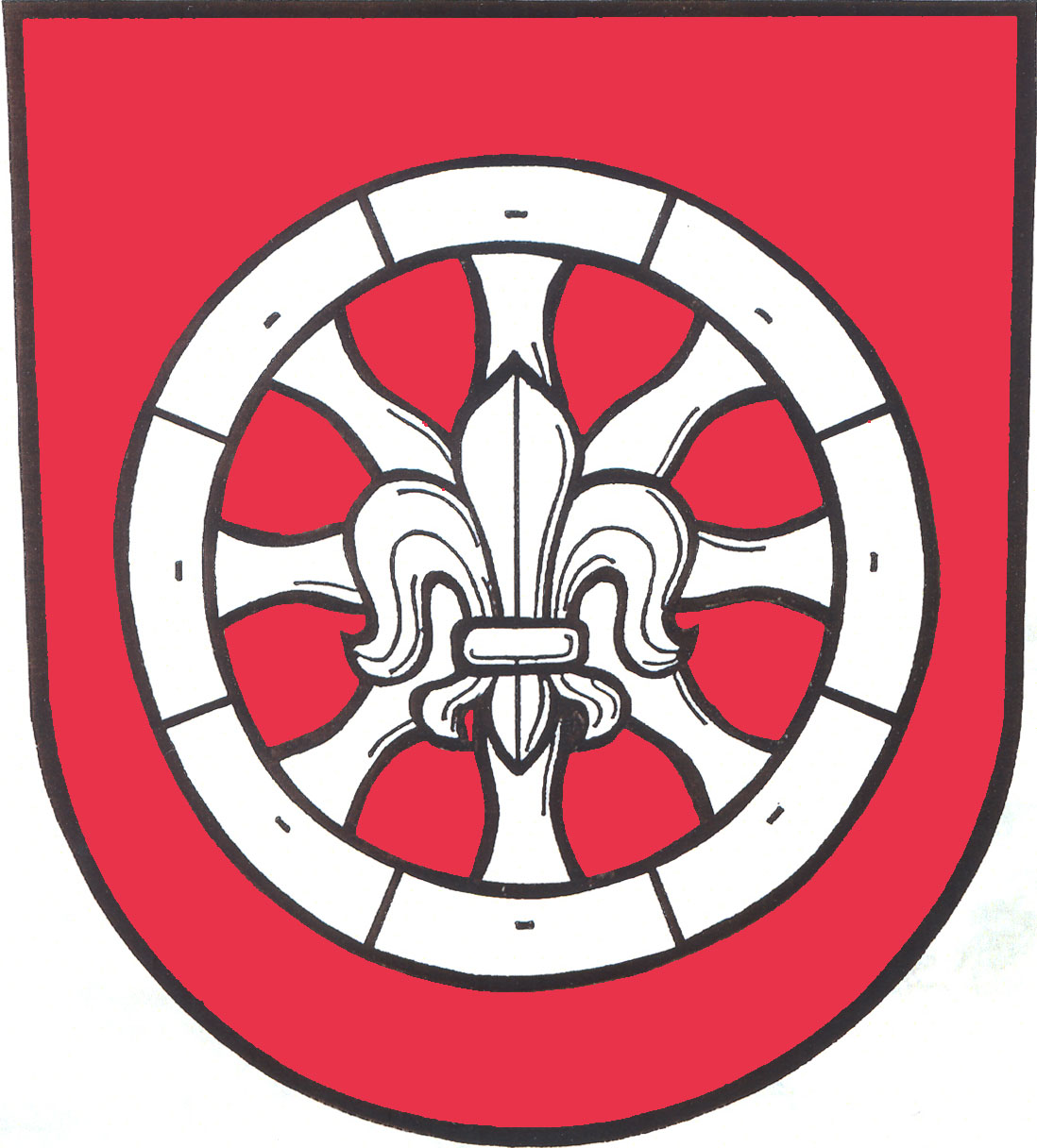
- Flag Coat of arms

- Location in the Czech Republic
- Coordinates: 49°40′58″N 17°57′27″E
- Country: Czech Republic
- Region: Moravian-Silesian
- District: Nový Jičín
- First mentioned: 1324

Area
  - Total: 15.93 km^{2} (6.15 sq mi)
- Elevation: 254 m (833 ft)

Population (2026-01-01)
  - Total: 1,045
  - Density: 65.60/km^{2} (169.9/sq mi)
- Time zone: UTC+1 (CET)
  - Summer (DST): UTC+2 (CEST)
- Postal code: 742 47
- Website: www.hladkezivotice.cz

Hladké Životice (German: Seitendorf) is a municipality and village in Nový Jičín District in the Moravian-Silesian Region of the Czech Republic. It has about 1,000 inhabitants.

== Demographics ==
Historical population
Year	Pop.	±%
1869	934	—
1880	976	+4.5%
1890	958	−1.8%
1900	895	−6.6%
1910	1,018	+13.7%
1921	1,019	+0.1%
1930	1,107	+8.6%
1950	944	−14.7%
1961	1,031	+9.2%
1970	940	−8.8%
1980	978	+4.0%
1991	982	+0.4%
2001	956	−2.6%
2011	963	+0.7%
2021	941	−2.3%
Source: Censuses
