= Žužemberk =

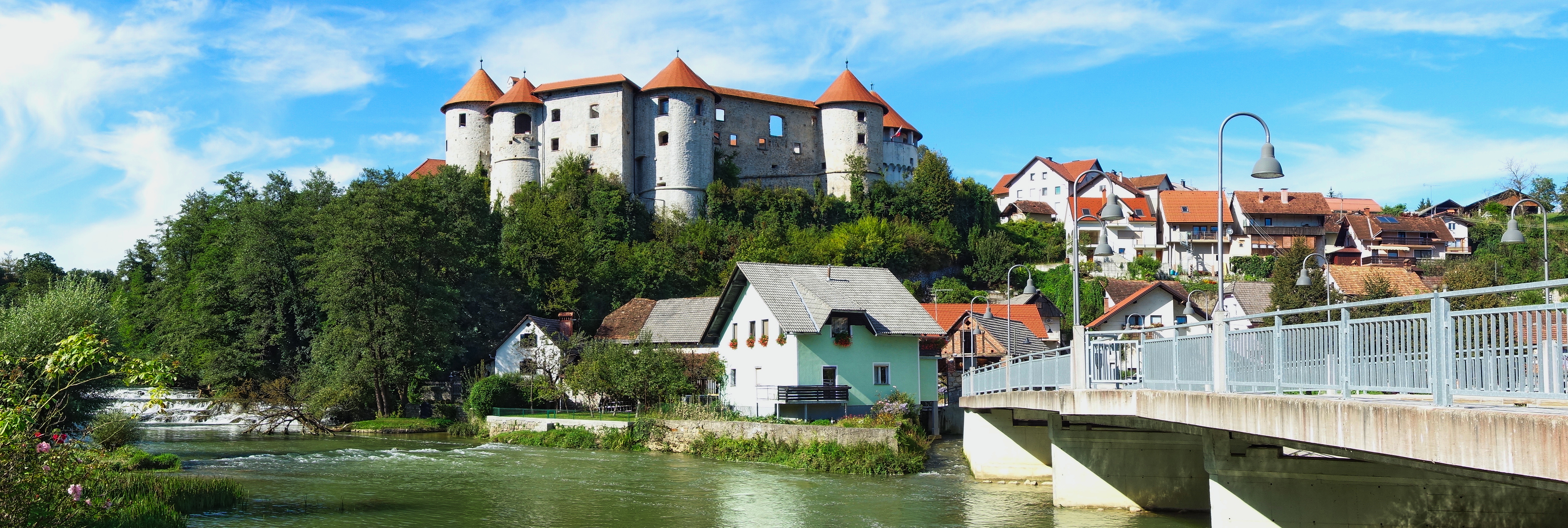
- Interactive map of Žužemberk
- Location in Slovenia
- Coordinates: 45°49′54″N 14°55′47″E
- Country: Slovenia
- Traditional region: Lower Carniola
- Statistical region: Southeast Slovenia
- Municipality: Žužemberk

Area
  - Total: 7.76 km^{2} (3.00 sq mi)
- Elevation: 209 m (686 ft)

Population (2018)
  - Total: 1,020

Žužemberk (pronounced [ˈʒuːʒɛmbɛɾk]; German: Seisenberg), is a town located southeast of the Slovenian capital of Ljubljana. It is the seat of the Municipality of Žužemberk. The area is part of the historical region of Lower Carniola. The municipality is now included in the Southeast Slovenia Statistical Region. Žužemberk lies in the southern part of Carniola on the left bank of the Krka River and is dominated by a medieval castle. The parish church was completely destroyed in World War II and was rebuilt in recent years.

== History ==
The Romans built a road through the region. Žužemberk was first mentioned in written documents dating to 1246. In 1399 it was granted market rights. The castle is believed to date back to around 1000, and the castle chapel dedicated to St. Ulrich was built in 1046. The village that grew around the castle was located at an intersection, and most of its inhabitants were craftsmen or peasants who traded their goods and held fairs.

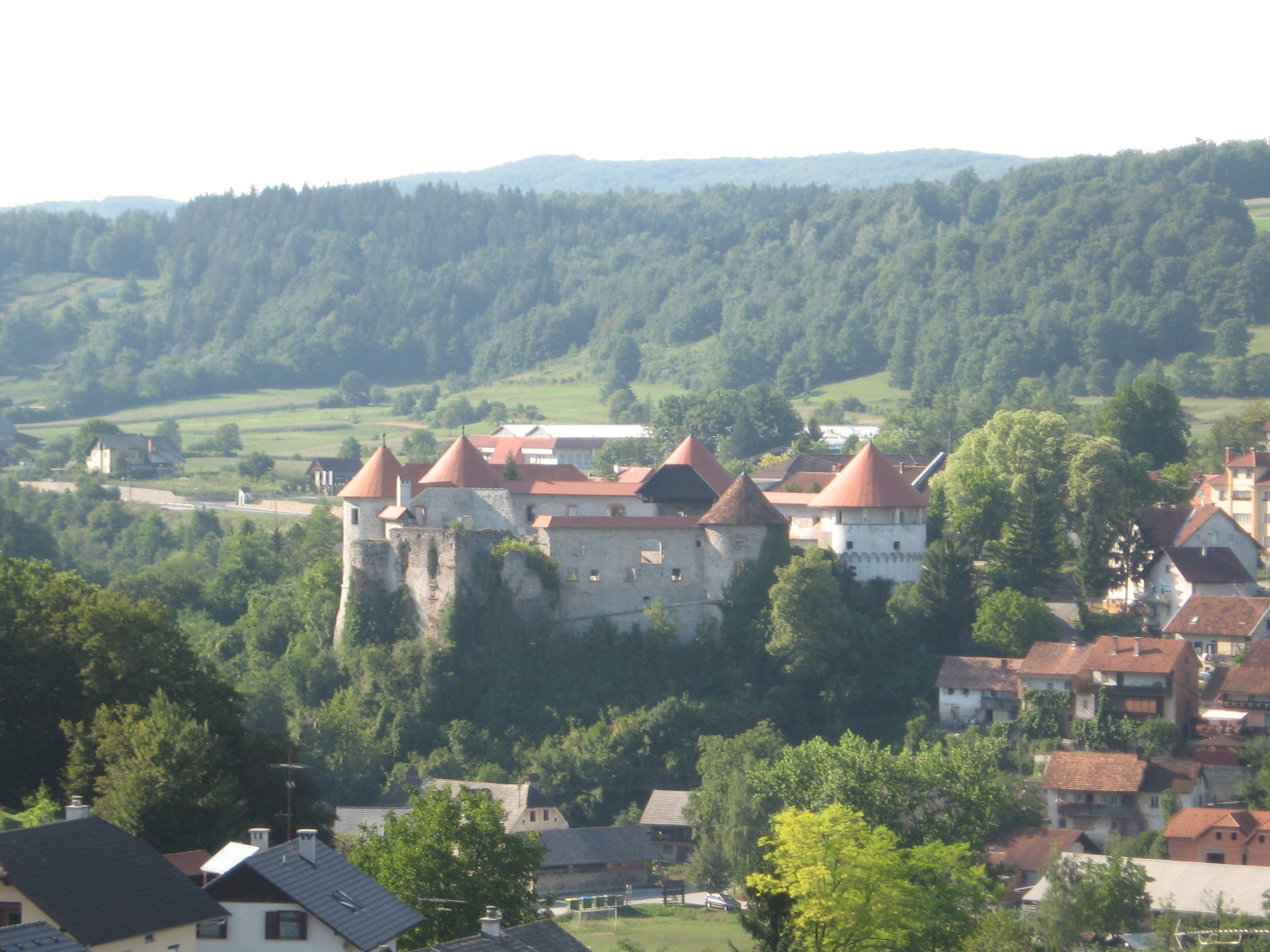
Žužemberk Castle, home of the Auerspergs

Between 1526 and 1533, the prince bishop Christophorus Rauber fortified the castle and added seven defence towers or bastilles. As a result of its new strength, the brothers Jurij and Wolf Auersperg from Turjak bought the castle in 1538, and for centuries the castle and town were in the possession of the leading noble Auersperg family. One of its most esteemed owners was Johann Weikhard of Auersperg, the tutor of the emperor Ferdinand III, who was court councillor and the first minister in the Habsburg monarchy, and who obtained family rights to prevent the castle's sale. In the 16th century the town suffered repeated attacks. In 1559, the castle was conquered by Gregor, an illegitimate son of Georg von Auersperg with eighteen soldiers, but this conquest was quickly suppressed, and the castle was recaptured by Herbard VIII von Auersperg, the general of the Croatian region of the time, and the dead soldiers were thrown into the forest to be devoured by wild beasts. In 1575, Countess Ana von Eck from Brdo Castle was killed by a tame bear in the castle courtyard.

Over the next century a number of important nobles were born in the town, including in 1557 Andreas von Auersperg, the son of Wolf Engelbert, who after completing his studies in Padua, went on the receive a decoration by both the Pope and the Habsburg Emperor for his role in the defeat of the Turks in 1593.

In 1615 Johann Weikhard of Auersperg was born in Žužemberk. He became the tutor of the emperor Ferdinand III, later becoming a prince and first minister in the Habsburg monarchy, and a cardinal in 1669, upon which he returned to this town, where he died in 1677. His great-grandson, Joseph Franz Auersperg, became a cardinal in 1783.

The Auersperg family established a notable ironworks in the town, and the steel industry was important to the economy. The Auersperg installed a blast furnace and ironworks in 1763, and were granted permission for extensive iron mining in the area. By 1891, however, the industry operations in Žužemberk faced excessive competition and costly production and ceased operating. A number of sawmills and water mills also developed in the town, and Žužemberk also has one of the oldest paper mills in Slovenia. In 1775, the Empress Maria Theresa gave consent to guild of seventeen tanners in Žužemberk, and it became an important trade, with merchants in Žužemberk making trousers, aprons, wine-skins and wheat sacks. The castle served as a prison for many years, but was depopulated in 1893.

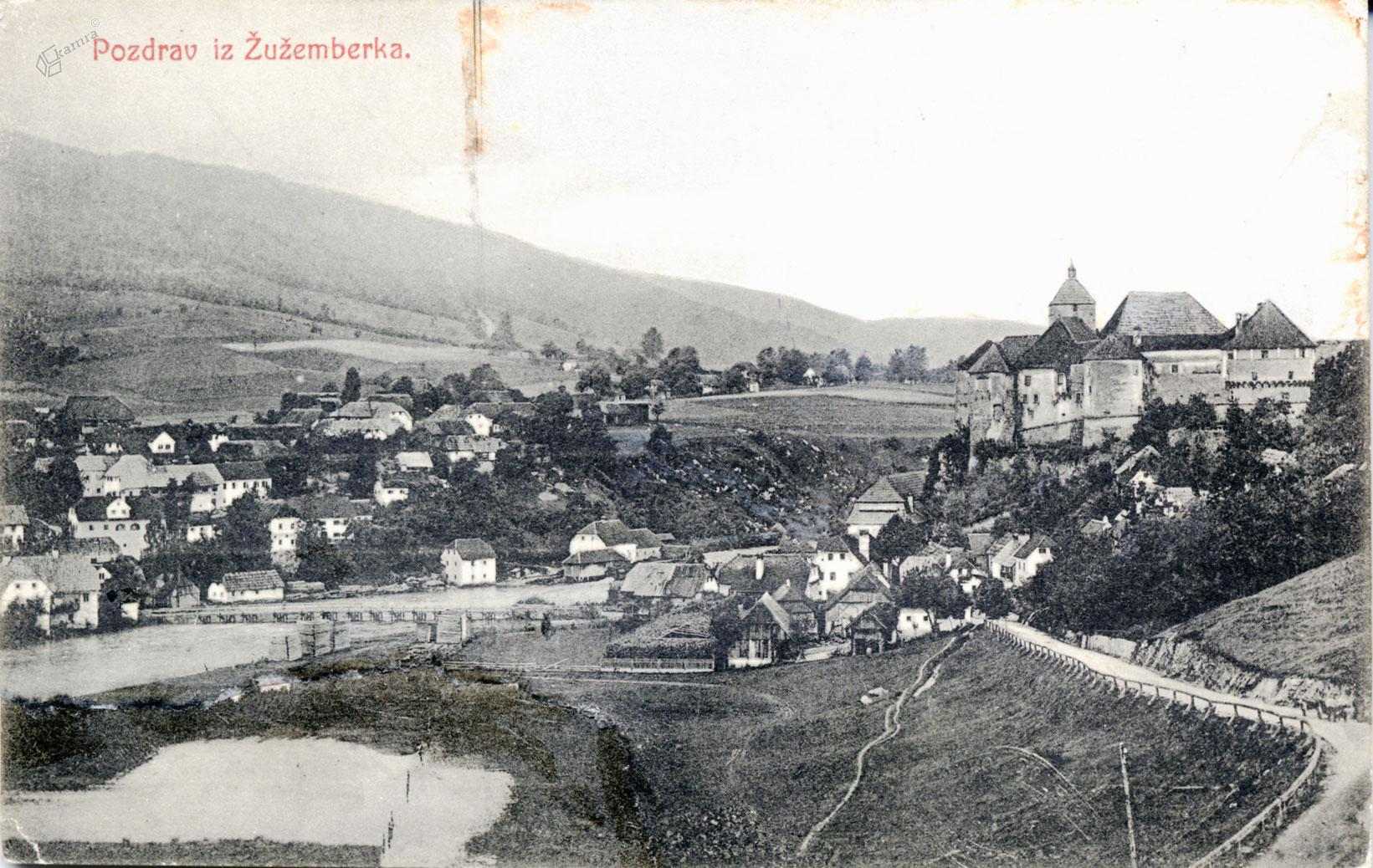
Žužemberk in 1900

During the Second World War, Italian troops were stationed at the castle and guerrillas set it on fire. Partisan forces burned the school, courthouse, and health center in Žužemberk on July 26, 1943. In February 1945, as a Home Guard stronghold, Žužemberk was attacked by SAAF rocket attacks. The castle was heavily damaged but not destroyed (as the church was), and restoration work began in the 1960s.

== Culture ==
Žužemberk has an exceptional cultural heritage, and the municipality has 54 recognized cultural monuments, 12 of which are sites of national importance.

Žužemberk Castle is a prominent medieval fortress rising above the Krka River. During the summer months festivities are held in the castle courtyard, managed by the tourism association since 1997. A municipal holiday is held on 15 July.

Saint Nicholas' Church in Žužemberk is the oldest surviving church in the area. The church was first built in the Gothic style in the 13th century. Its frescoes, with one of the most notable depicting Adam and Eve, date from the 14th century. Saint Agnes' Church dates from somewhat later in the 13th century. Saints Hermagoras and Fortunatus Church was completed in 1769, was burned down in 1945 by the order of Partisan commander Pero Popivoda, and only renovated in the late 20th century after Slovenia became independent. The route of a Roman road along the slopes of hills in Acerva (Ivančna Gorica) was in use until 1859, when it was replaced with another road through the Krka Valley. There are also several graves and a monument to the Second World War on Tumplac Hill (305 meters or 1,001 feet). It was created by sculptor Marjan Tepine and was erected in 1961.

== Notable people ==
- Andreas von Auersperg (1556–1593), Carniolan noble and military leader
- Johann Weikhard of Auersperg (1615–1677), Duke of Munsterberg, Chief Steward and President of the Privy Council at the Viennese court
- Rozalija Sršen (stage name Zalla Zarana; 1897–1967), actress
- Krista Povirk (1938–2004), catechist, poet, and choir director
