= Hermsdorf =

Hermsdorf may refer to the following places:

- in Germany:
  - Hermsdorf, Brandenburg, in the Oberspreewald-Lausitz district, Brandenburg
  - Hermsdorf, Saxony-Anhalt, in the Börde district, Saxony-Anhalt
  - Hermsdorf, Saxony, in the Weißeritzkreis district, Saxony
  - Hermsdorf, Thuringia, in the Saale-Holzland district, Thuringia
  - Hermsdorf (Berlin), part of the borough Reinickendorf in Berlin
- in Poland:
  - Hermsdorf, the German name for Jerzmanowa, Głogów County
  - Hermsdorf the German name for Sobięcin
  - Hermsdorf am Kynast, the German name for Sobieszów, part of Jelenia Góra
- in the Czech Republic:
  - Hermsdorf, the German name for Heřmánky, a village in Nový Jičín District
