= Bernartice =

Bernartice may refer to places in the Czech Republic:

- Bernartice (Benešov District), a municipality and village in the Central Bohemian Region
- Bernartice (Jeseník District), a municipality and village in the Olomouc Region
- Bernartice (Písek District), a market town in the South Bohemian Region
- Bernartice (Trutnov District), a municipality and village in the Hradec Králové Region
- Bernartice, a village and part of Kolinec in the Plzeň Region
- Bernartice, a village and part of Stráž (Tachov District) in the Plzeň Region
- Bernartice nad Odrou, a municipality and village in the Moravian-Silesian Region
