= Bítov (Nový Jičín District) =

- Municipality
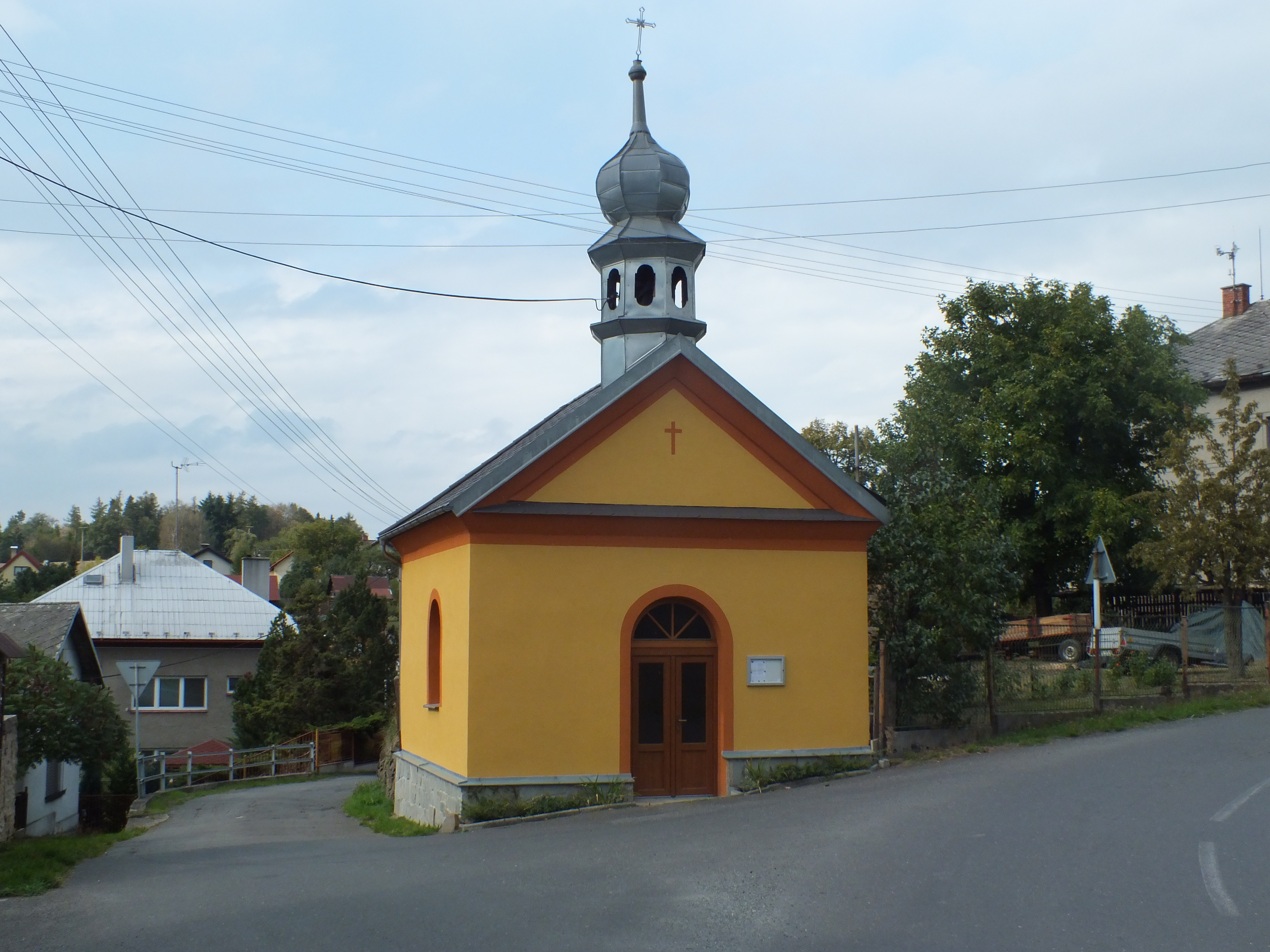
- Chapel of Saint John of Nepomuk

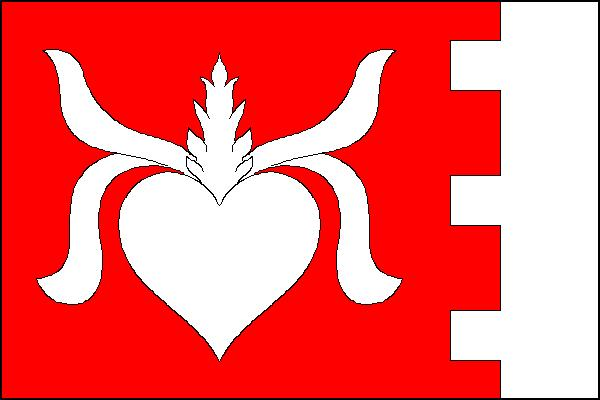
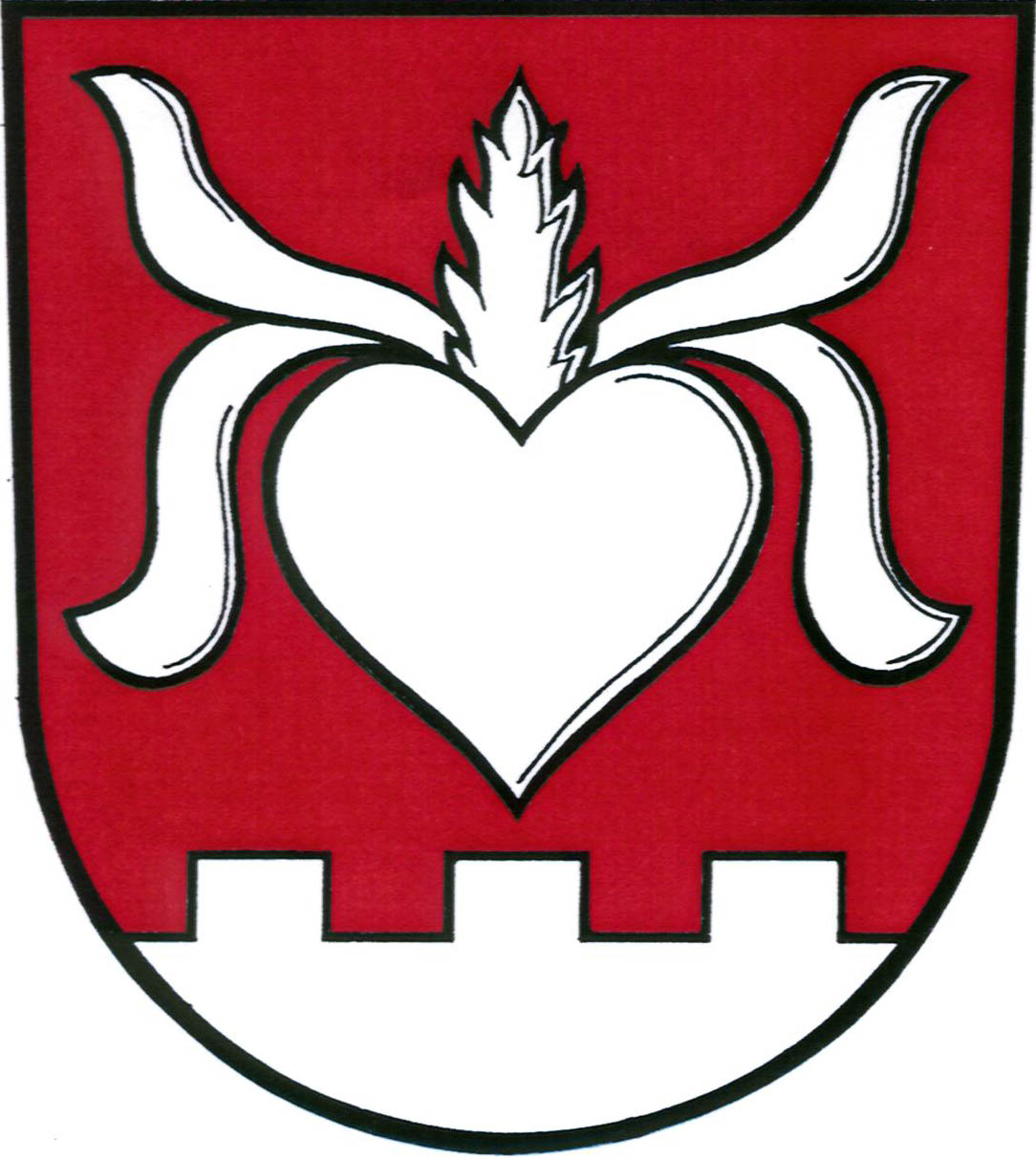
- Flag Coat of arms

- Location in the Czech Republic
- Coordinates: 49°48′1″N 18°2′51″E
- Country: Czech Republic
- Region: Moravian-Silesian
- District: Nový Jičín
- First mentioned: 1377

Area
  - Total: 4.39 km^{2} (1.69 sq mi)
- Elevation: 360 m (1,180 ft)

Population (2026-01-01)
  - Total: 488
  - Density: 111/km^{2} (288/sq mi)
- Time zone: UTC+1 (CET)
  - Summer (DST): UTC+2 (CEST)
- Postal code: 743 01
- Website: www.obecbitov.cz

Bítov is a municipality and village in Nový Jičín District in the Moravian-Silesian Region of the Czech Republic. It has about 500 inhabitants.

== Demographics ==
Historical population
Year	Pop.	±%
1869	393	—
1880	395	+0.5%
1890	414	+4.8%
1900	503	+21.5%
1910	541	+7.6%
1921	421	−22.2%
1930	475	+12.8%
1950	394	−17.1%
1961	442	+12.2%
1970	453	+2.5%
1980	443	−2.2%
1991	423	−4.5%
2001	391	−7.6%
2011	415	+6.1%
2021	466	+12.3%
Source: Censuses
