= Jakubčovice nad Odrou =

- Municipality
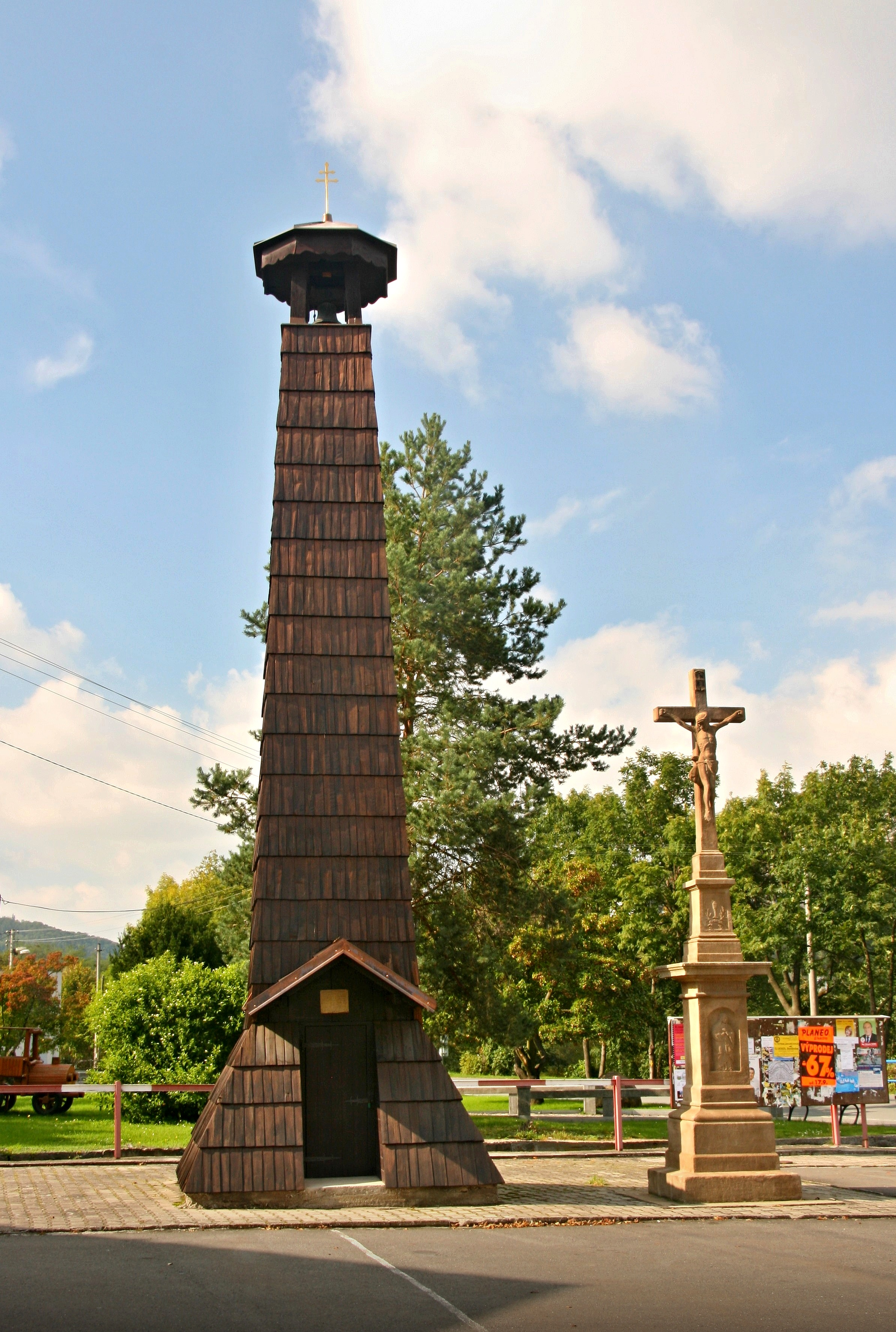
- Bell tower

- Flag Coat of arms

- Location in the Czech Republic
- Coordinates: 49°41′42″N 17°47′16″E
- Country: Czech Republic
- Region: Moravian-Silesian
- District: Nový Jičín
- First mentioned: 1374

Area
  - Total: 3.38 km^{2} (1.31 sq mi)
- Elevation: 314 m (1,030 ft)

Population (2026-01-01)
  - Total: 628
  - Density: 186/km^{2} (481/sq mi)
- Time zone: UTC+1 (CET)
  - Summer (DST): UTC+2 (CEST)
- Postal code: 742 36
- Website: www.jakubcovice.cz

Jakubčovice nad Odrou is a municipality and village in Nový Jičín District in the Moravian-Silesian Region of the Czech Republic. It has about 600 inhabitants.

== History ==
The first written mention of Jakubčovice nad Odrou is from 1374.

During the World War II, the German occupiers operated two forced labour subcamps of the Stalag VIII-B/344 prisoner-of-war camp at the local quarry.

== Demographics ==
Historical population
Year	Pop.	±%
1869	221	—
1880	228	+3.2%
1890	269	+18.0%
1900	256	−4.8%
1910	272	+6.2%
1921	269	−1.1%
1930	333	+23.8%
1950	313	−6.0%
1961	422	+34.8%
1970	565	+33.9%
1980	718	+27.1%
1991	707	−1.5%
2001	691	−2.3%
2011	662	−4.2%
2021	618	−6.6%
Source: Censuses

== Sports ==
Football club Jakubčovice Fotbal is based there. Since 2007, it has been participating in lower amateur tiers.
