= Závišice =

- Municipality
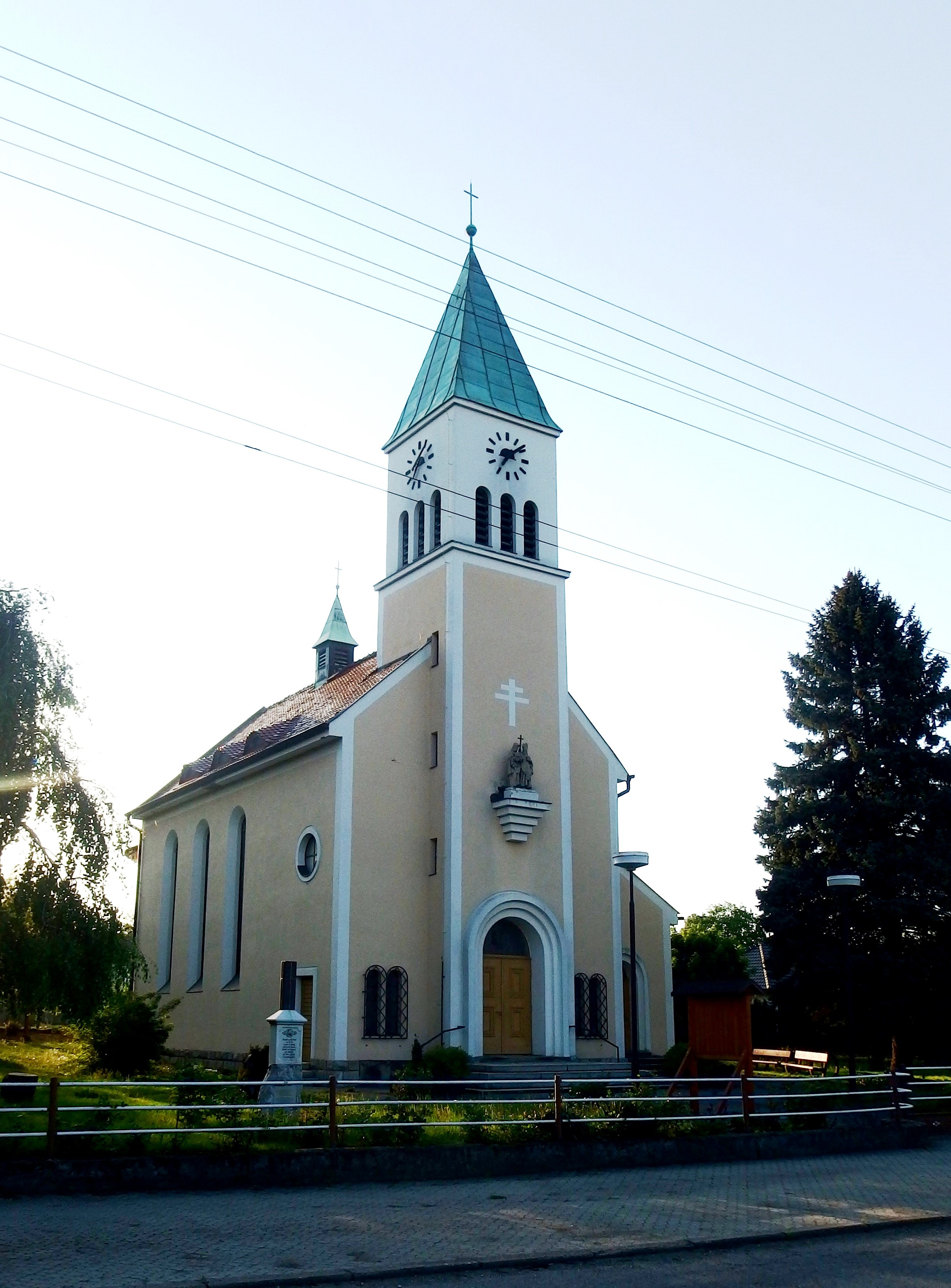
- Church of Saints Cyril and Methodius

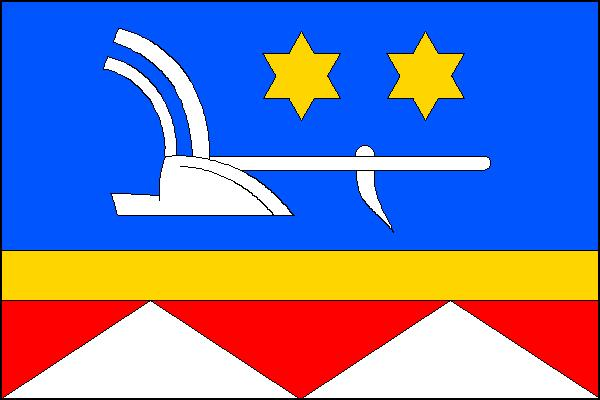
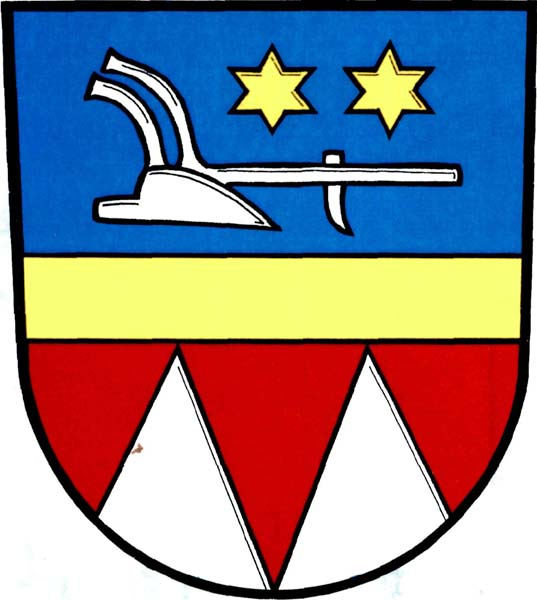
- Flag Coat of arms

- Location in the Czech Republic
- Coordinates: 49°36′48″N 18°6′11″E
- Country: Czech Republic
- Region: Moravian-Silesian
- District: Nový Jičín
- First mentioned: 1354

Area
  - Total: 6.33 km^{2} (2.44 sq mi)
- Elevation: 281 m (922 ft)

Population (2026-01-01)
  - Total: 1,156
  - Density: 183/km^{2} (473/sq mi)
- Time zone: UTC+1 (CET)
  - Summer (DST): UTC+2 (CEST)
- Postal code: 742 21
- Website: www.zavisice.cz

Závišice (German: Sawersdorf) is a municipality and village in Nový Jičín District in the Moravian-Silesian Region of the Czech Republic. It has about 1,200 inhabitants.

== History ==
The first written mention of Závišice is from 1354.

== Demographics ==
Historical population
Year	Pop.	±%
1869	668	—
1880	741	+10.9%
1890	800	+8.0%
1900	846	+5.8%
1910	988	+16.8%
1921	970	−1.8%
1930	929	−4.2%
1950	799	−14.0%
1961	812	+1.6%
1970	860	+5.9%
1980	767	−10.8%
1991	657	−14.3%
2001	733	+11.6%
2011	895	+22.1%
2021	1,023	+14.3%
Source: Censuses
