= Heřmanice u Oder =

- Municipality
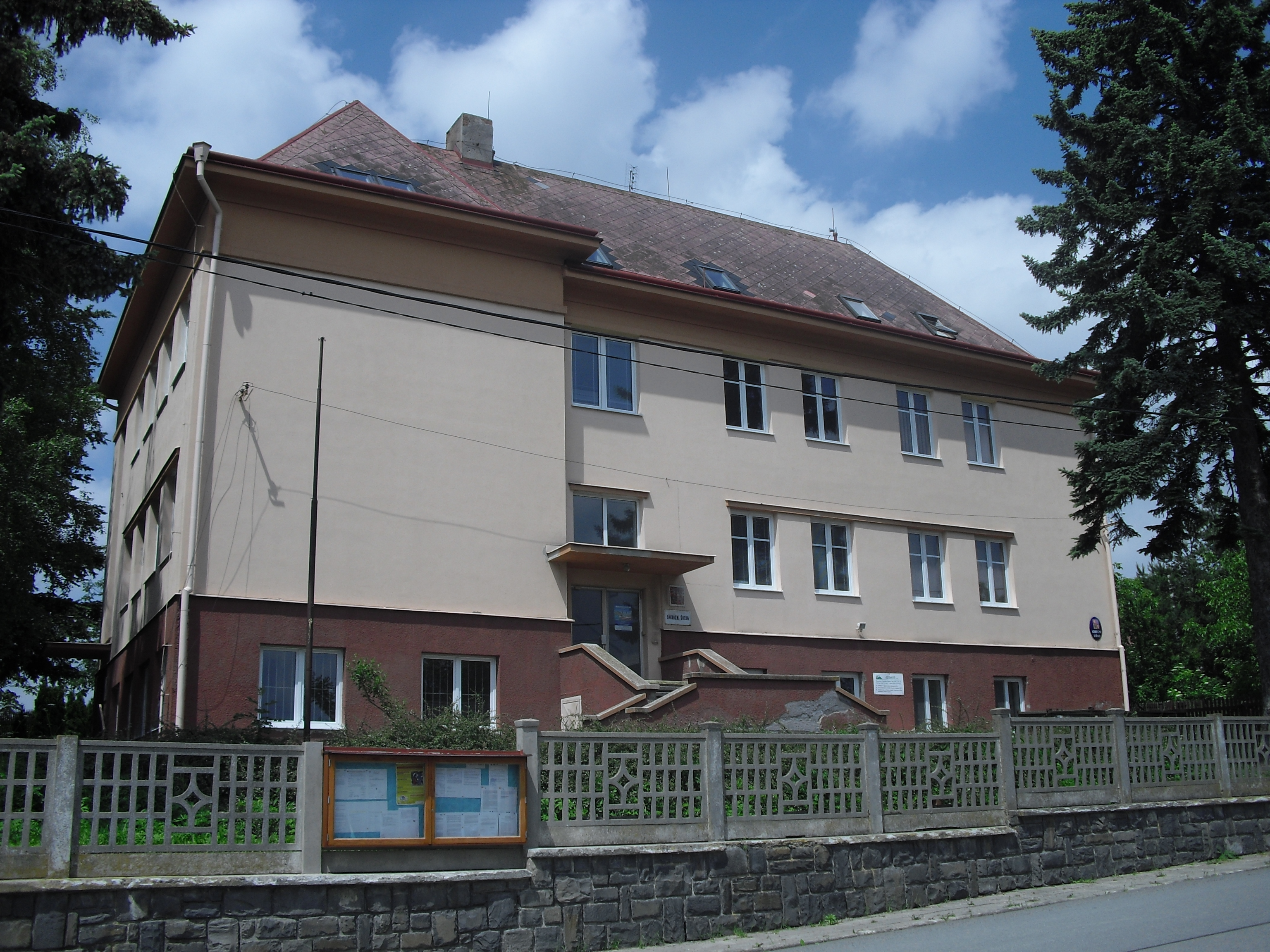
- Municipal office

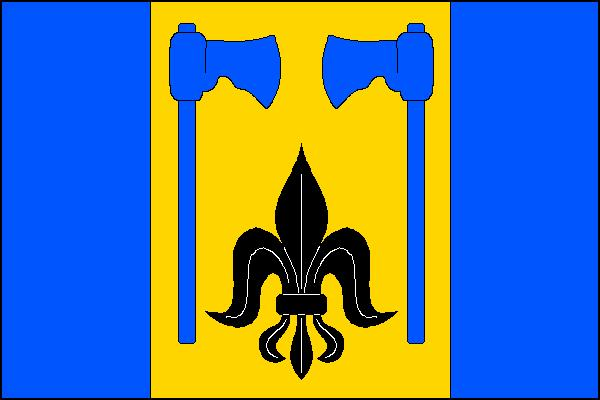
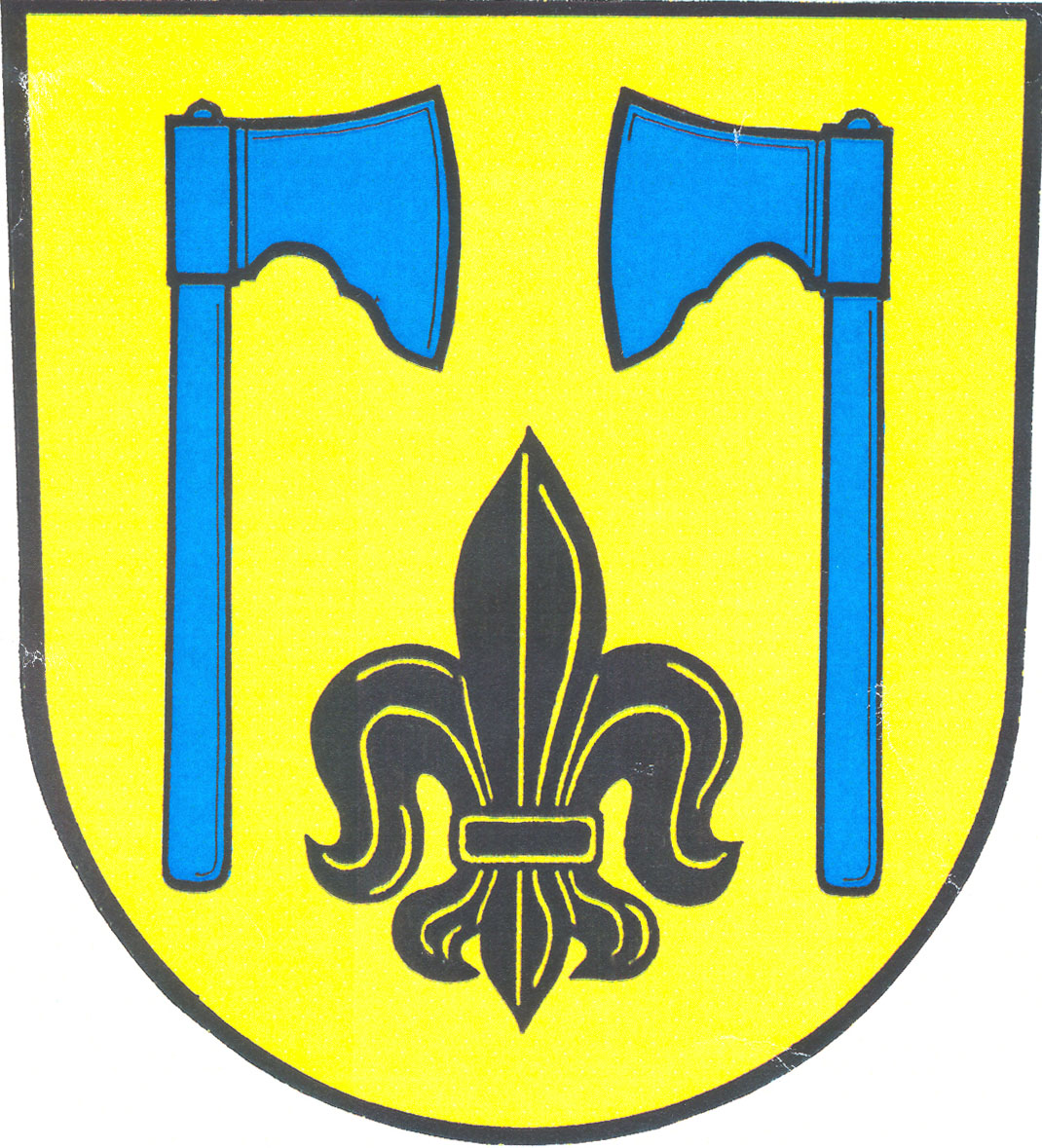
- Flag Coat of arms

- Location in the Czech Republic
- Coordinates: 49°42′49″N 17°48′19″E
- Country: Czech Republic
- Region: Moravian-Silesian
- District: Nový Jičín
- First mentioned: 1374

Area
  - Total: 11.95 km^{2} (4.61 sq mi)
- Elevation: 486 m (1,594 ft)

Population (2026-01-01)
  - Total: 358
  - Density: 30.0/km^{2} (77.6/sq mi)
- Time zone: UTC+1 (CET)
  - Summer (DST): UTC+2 (CEST)
- Postal code: 742 35
- Website: www.hermaniceuoder.cz

Heřmanice u Oder (German: Gross Hermsdorf) is a municipality and village in Nový Jičín District in the Moravian-Silesian Region of the Czech Republic. It has about 400 inhabitants.

== Administrative division ==
Heřmanice u Oder consists of two municipal parts (in brackets population according to the 2021 census):

- Heřmanice u Oder (295)
- Véska (60)

== Demographics ==
Historical population
Year	Pop.	±%
1869	635	—
1880	655	+3.1%
1890	604	−7.8%
1900	549	−9.1%
1910	542	−1.3%
1921	509	−6.1%
1930	524	+2.9%
1950	364	−30.5%
1961	387	+6.3%
1970	358	−7.5%
1980	353	−1.4%
1991	318	−9.9%
2001	339	+6.6%
2011	316	−6.8%
2021	355	+12.3%
Source: Censuses
