= Velké Albrechtice =

- Municipality
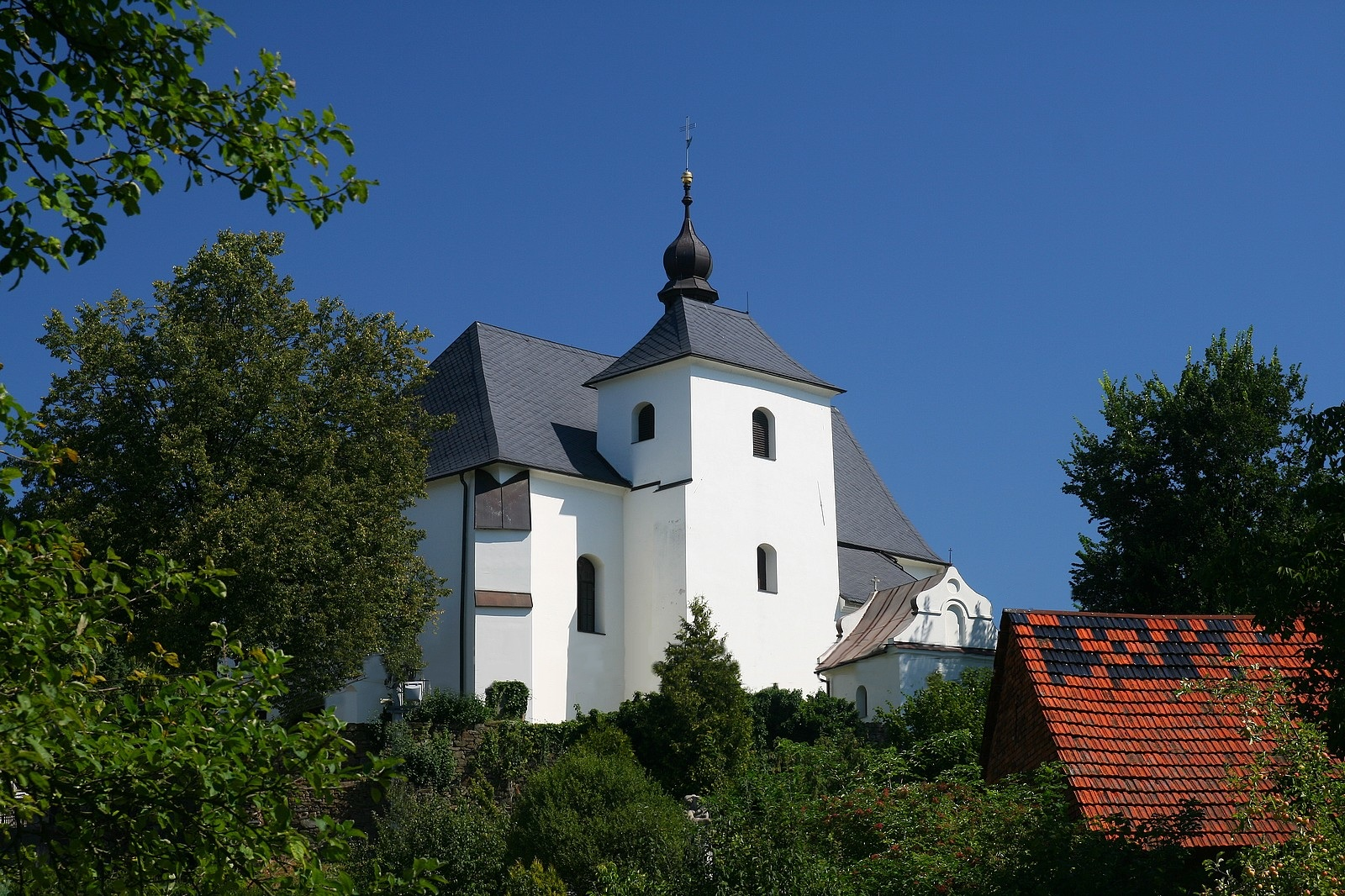
- Church of Saint John the Baptist

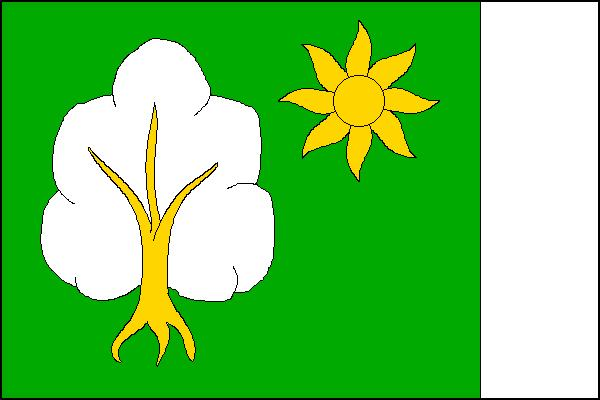
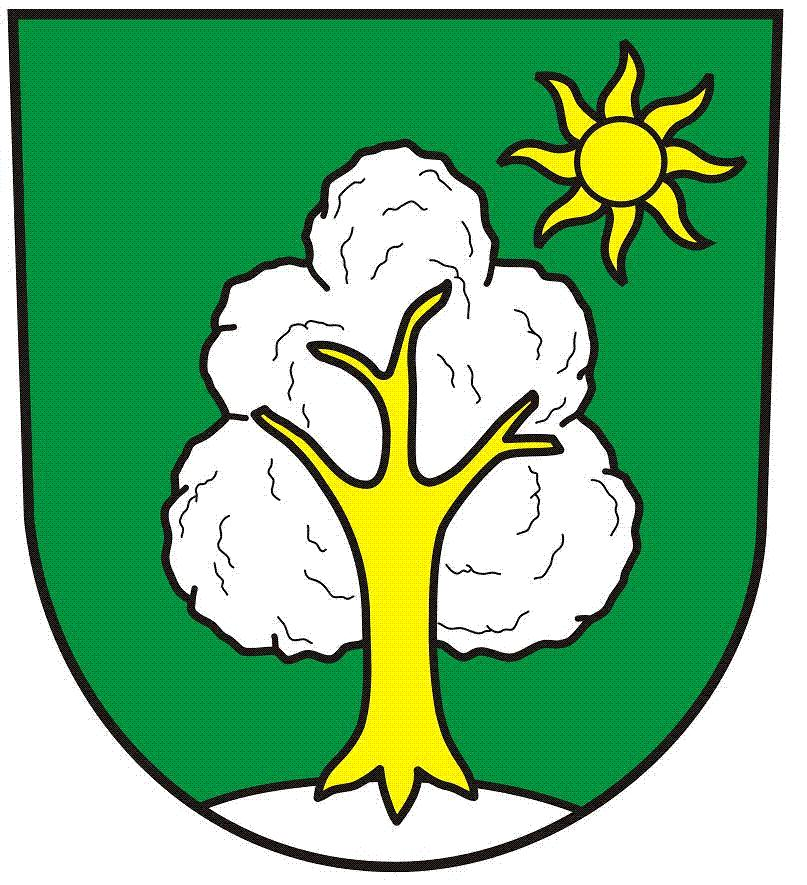
- Flag Coat of arms

- Location in the Czech Republic
- Coordinates: 49°45′2″N 18°2′38″E
- Country: Czech Republic
- Region: Moravian-Silesian
- District: Nový Jičín
- First mentioned: 1414

Area
  - Total: 13.01 km^{2} (5.02 sq mi)
- Elevation: 243 m (797 ft)

Population (2026-01-01)
  - Total: 1,179
  - Density: 90.62/km^{2} (234.7/sq mi)
- Time zone: UTC+1 (CET)
  - Summer (DST): UTC+2 (CEST)
- Postal code: 742 91
- Website: www.velkealbrechtice.cz

Velké Albrechtice (German: Gross Olbersdorf) is a municipality and village in Nový Jičín District in the Moravian-Silesian Region of the Czech Republic. It has about 1,200 inhabitants.

== Demographics ==
Historical population
Year	Pop.	±%
1869	1,285	—
1880	1,361	+5.9%
1890	1,366	+0.4%
1900	1,427	+4.5%
1910	1,430	+0.2%
1921	1,425	−0.3%
1930	1,100	−22.8%
1950	904	−17.8%
1961	887	−1.9%
1970	928	+4.6%
1980	938	+1.1%
1991	972	+3.6%
2001	941	−3.2%
2011	1,021	+8.5%
2021	1,119	+9.6%
Source: Censuses
