= Libhošť =

- Municipality
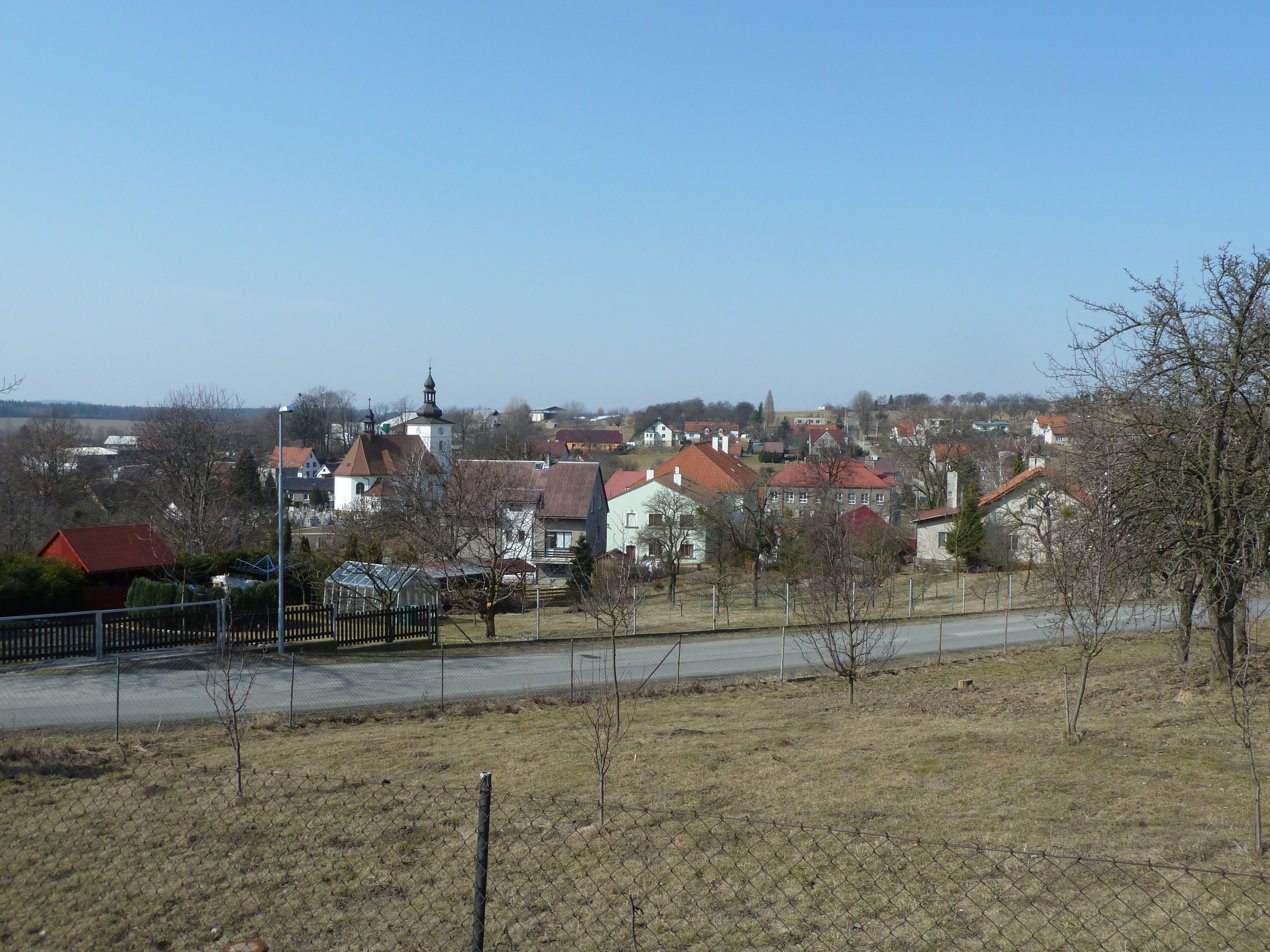
- General view of Libhošť

- Flag Coat of arms

- Location in the Czech Republic
- Coordinates: 49°37′35″N 18°4′37″E
- Country: Czech Republic
- Region: Moravian-Silesian
- District: Nový Jičín
- First mentioned: 1411

Area
  - Total: 8.20 km^{2} (3.17 sq mi)
- Elevation: 295 m (968 ft)

Population (2026-01-01)
  - Total: 1,769
  - Density: 216/km^{2} (559/sq mi)
- Time zone: UTC+1 (CET)
  - Summer (DST): UTC+2 (CEST)
- Postal code: 742 57
- Website: www.libhost.cz

Libhošť (German: Liebisch) is a municipality and village in Nový Jičín District in the Moravian-Silesian Region of the Czech Republic. It has about 1,800 inhabitants.

Libhošť lies approximately 5 kilometres (3 mi) northeast of Nový Jičín, 27 km (17 mi) southwest of Ostrava, and 268 km (167 mi) east of Prague.

== History ==
The first written mention of Libhošť is from 1411, however the village maybe existed already in 1230.

In 1976, Libhošť was joined to Nový Jičín. On 1 January 2011, it separated from Nový Jičín and became again an independent municipality.

== Demographics ==
Historical population
Year	Pop.	±%
1869	1,049	—
1880	1,149	+9.5%
1890	1,250	+8.8%
1900	1,373	+9.8%
1910	1,505	+9.6%
1921	1,594	+5.9%
1930	1,736	+8.9%
1950	1,506	−13.2%
1961	1,658	+10.1%
1970	1,603	−3.3%
1980	1,609	+0.4%
1991	1,561	−3.0%
2001	1,645	+5.4%
2011	1,539	−6.4%
2021	1,699	+10.4%
Source: Censuses
