= Sedlnice =

- Municipality
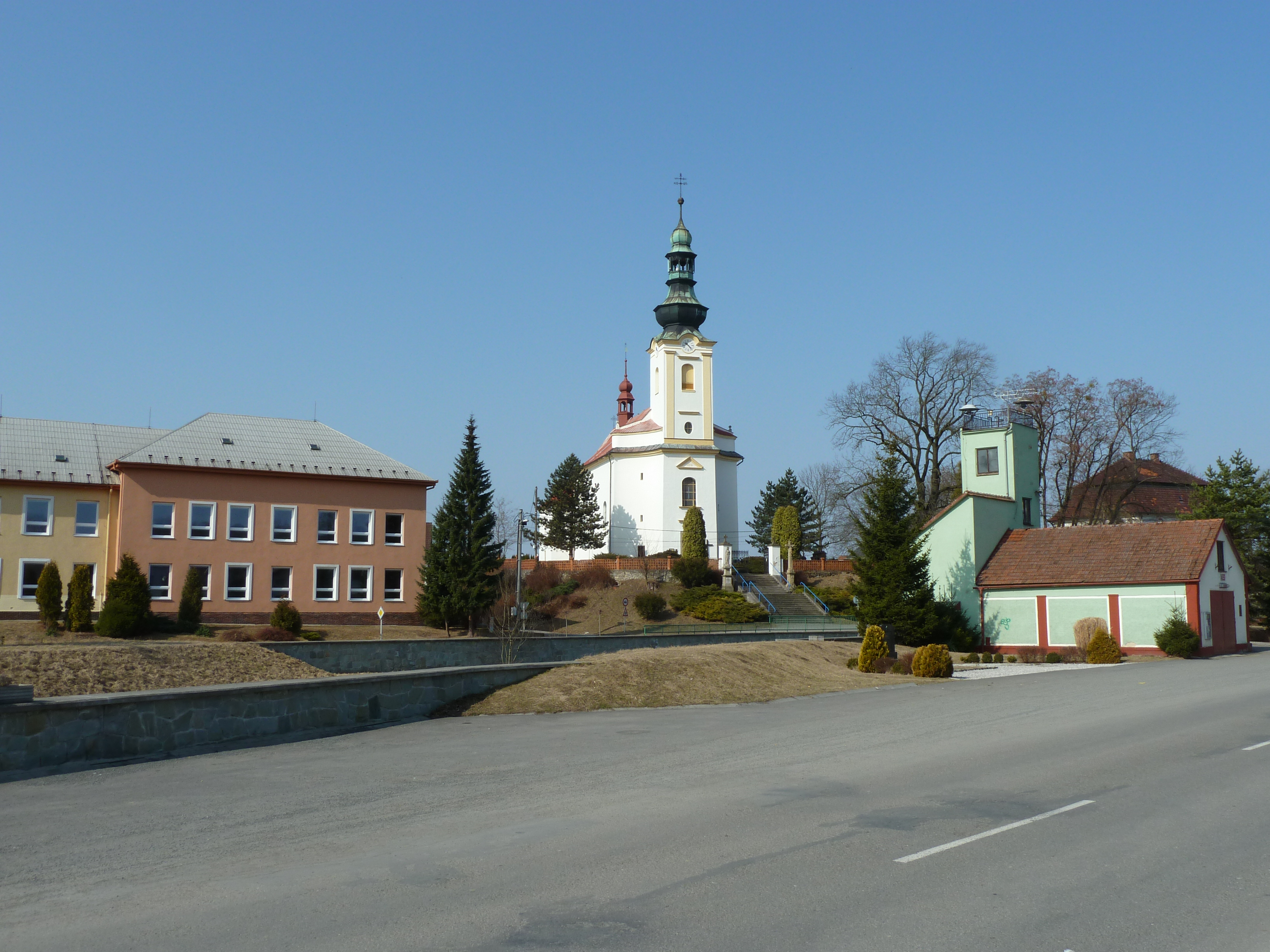
- Centre with Church of Saint Michael

- Flag Coat of arms

- Location in the Czech Republic
- Coordinates: 49°39′28″N 18°5′13″E
- Country: Czech Republic
- Region: Moravian-Silesian
- District: Nový Jičín
- First mentioned: 1267

Area
  - Total: 13.72 km^{2} (5.30 sq mi)
- Elevation: 254 m (833 ft)

Population (2026-01-01)
  - Total: 1,840
  - Density: 134/km^{2} (347/sq mi)
- Time zone: UTC+1 (CET)
  - Summer (DST): UTC+2 (CEST)
- Postal code: 742 56
- Website: www.sedlnice.cz

Sedlnice (German: Sedlnitz) is a municipality and village in Nový Jičín District in the Moravian-Silesian Region of the Czech Republic. It has about 1,800 inhabitants.

== History ==
The first written mention of Sedlnice is from 1267.

== Demographics ==
Historical population
Year	Pop.	±%
1869	1,717	—
1880	1,666	−3.0%
1890	1,684	+1.1%
1900	1,707	+1.4%
1910	1,854	+8.6%
1921	1,766	−4.7%
1930	1,750	−0.9%
1950	1,548	−11.5%
1961	1,466	−5.3%
1970	1,316	−10.2%
1980	1,143	−13.1%
1991	1,132	−1.0%
2001	1,295	+14.4%
2011	1,389	+7.3%
2021	1,638	+17.9%
Source: Censuses
