= Tísek =

- Municipality
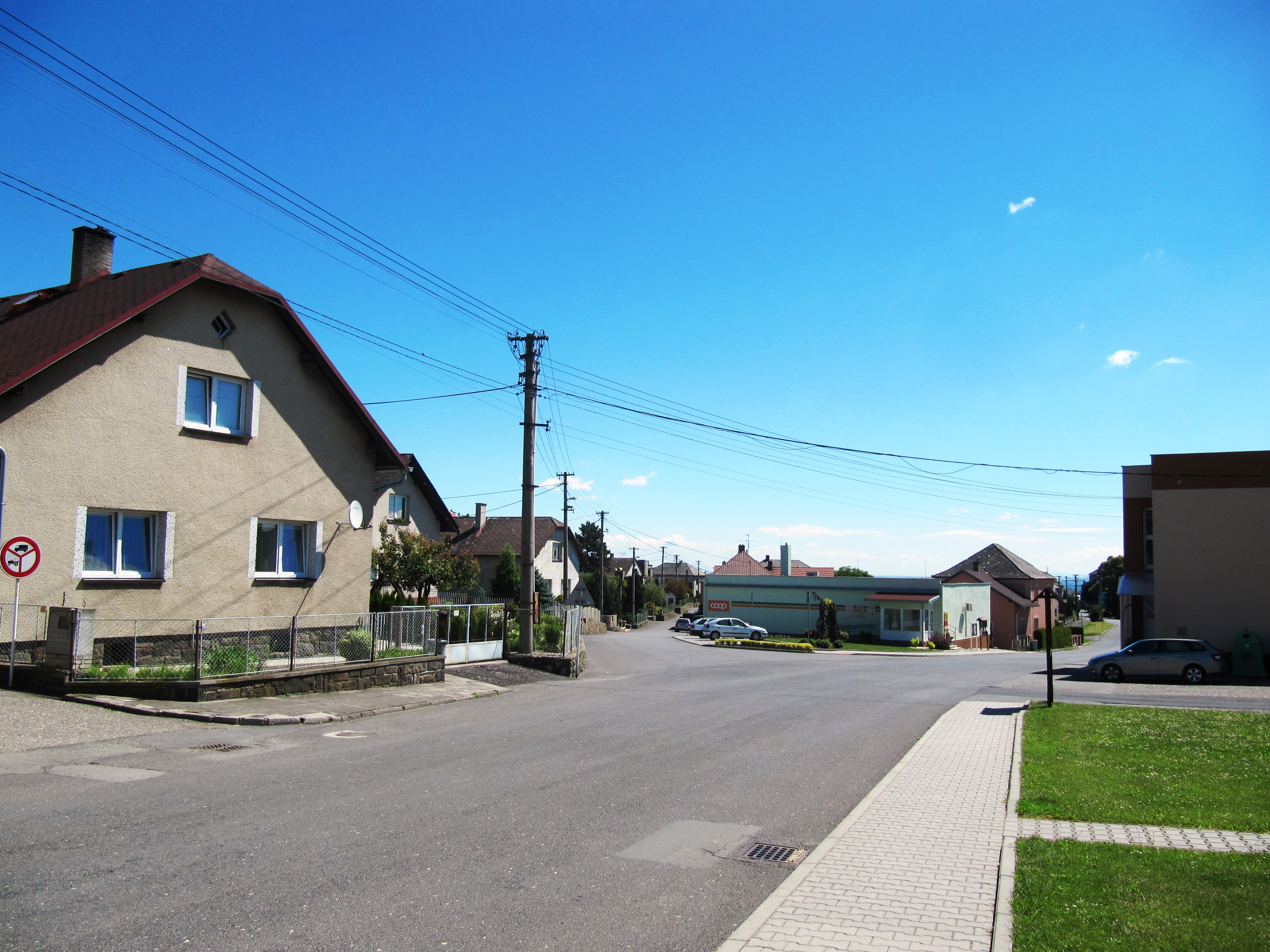
- Centre of Tísek

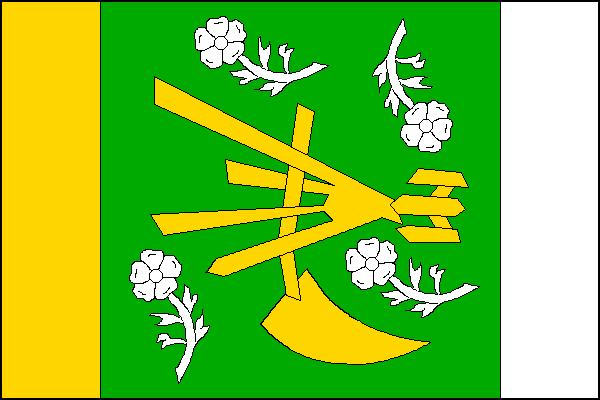
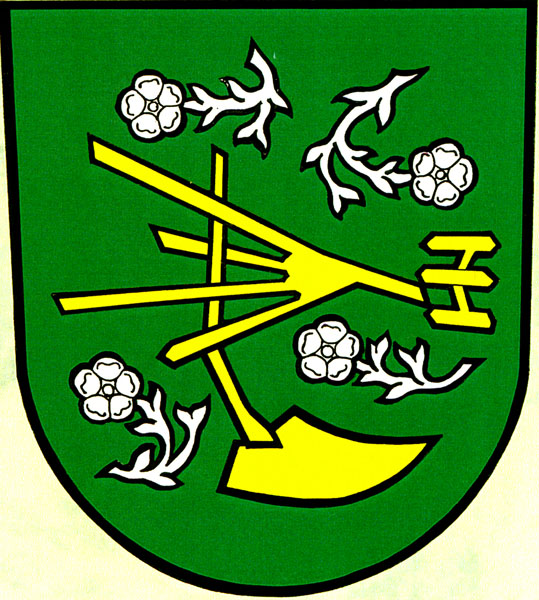
- Flag Coat of arms

- Location in the Czech Republic
- Coordinates: 49°47′34″N 18°0′53″E
- Country: Czech Republic
- Region: Moravian-Silesian
- District: Nový Jičín
- First mentioned: 1377

Area
  - Total: 8.21 km^{2} (3.17 sq mi)
- Elevation: 422 m (1,385 ft)

Population (2026-01-01)
  - Total: 980
  - Density: 120/km^{2} (310/sq mi)
- Time zone: UTC+1 (CET)
  - Summer (DST): UTC+2 (CEST)
- Postal code: 743 01
- Website: www.tisek.cz

Tísek is a municipality and village in Nový Jičín District in the Moravian-Silesian Region of the Czech Republic. It has about 1,000 inhabitants.

== Demographics ==
Historical population
Year	Pop.	±%
1869	481	—
1880	493	+2.5%
1890	568	+15.2%
1900	612	+7.7%
1910	695	+13.6%
1921	651	−6.3%
1930	733	+12.6%
1950	658	−10.2%
1961	758	+15.2%
1970	771	+1.7%
1980	823	+6.7%
1991	868	+5.5%
2001	882	+1.6%
2011	925	+4.9%
2021	962	+4.0%
Source: Censuses
