= Pustějov =

- Municipality
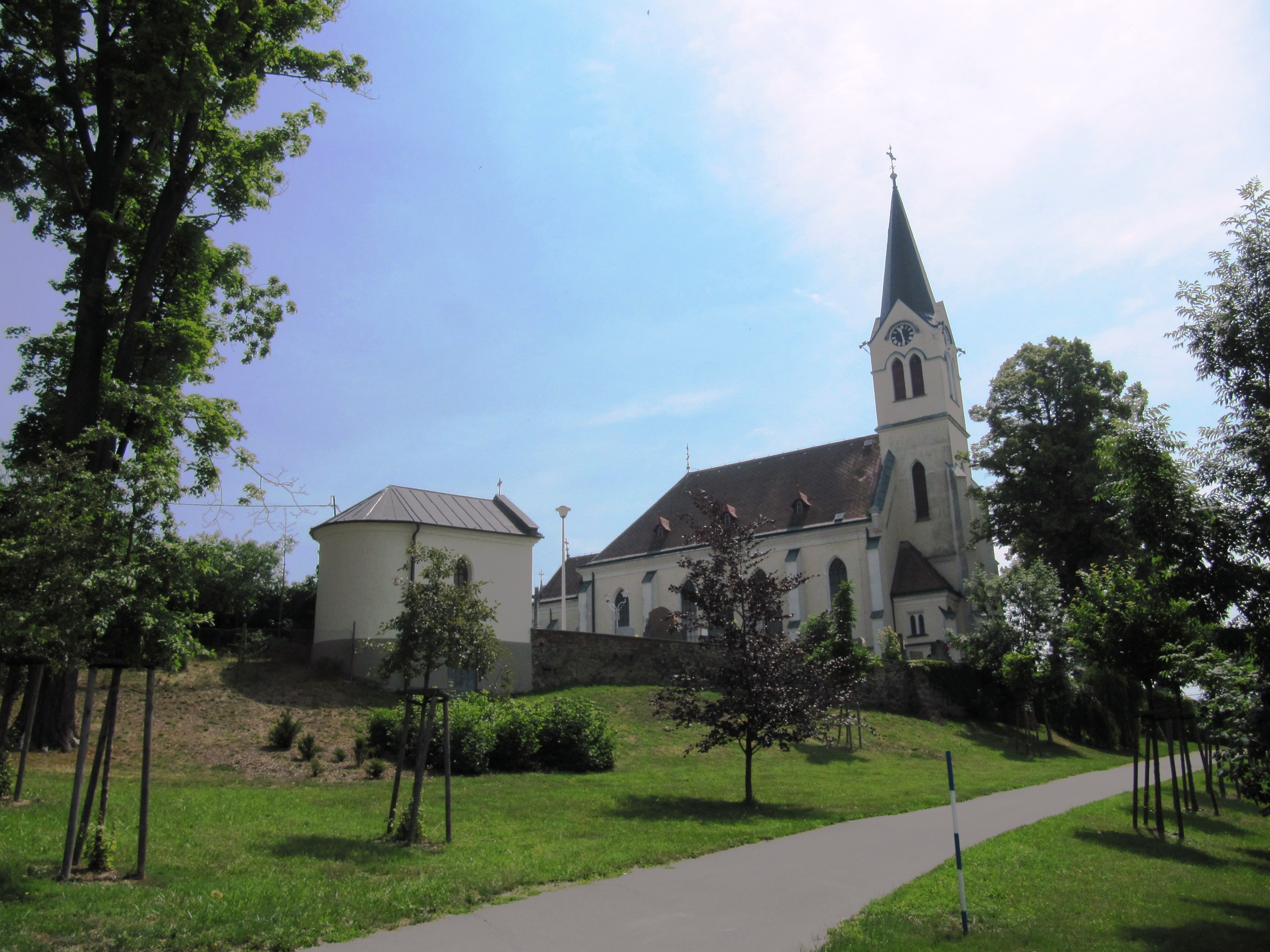
- Church of Saint Mary Magdalene

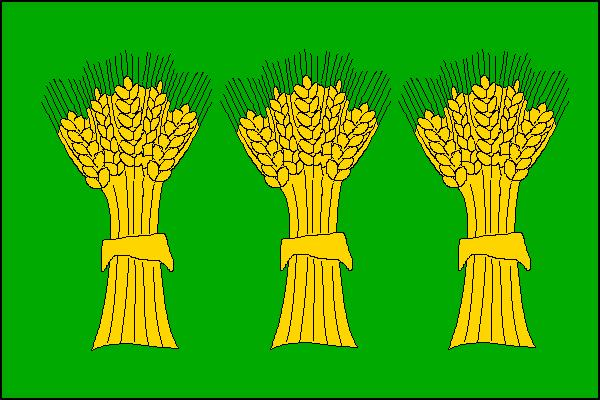
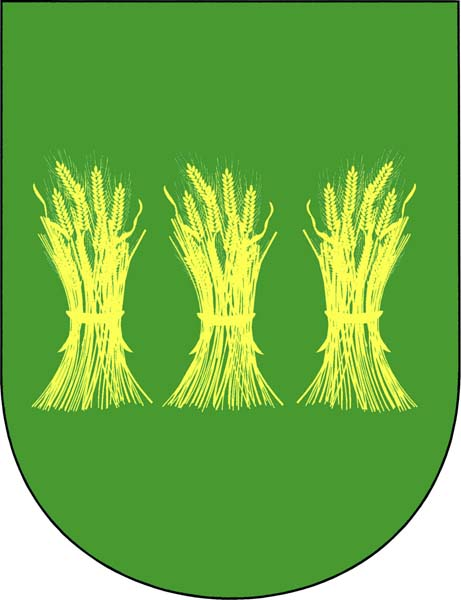
- Flag Coat of arms

- Location in the Czech Republic
- Coordinates: 49°42′2″N 18°0′14″E
- Country: Czech Republic
- Region: Moravian-Silesian
- District: Nový Jičín
- First mentioned: 1324

Area
  - Total: 8.55 km^{2} (3.30 sq mi)
- Elevation: 253 m (830 ft)

Population (2026-01-01)
  - Total: 989
  - Density: 116/km^{2} (300/sq mi)
- Time zone: UTC+1 (CET)
  - Summer (DST): UTC+2 (CEST)
- Postal code: 742 43
- Website: www.pustejov.cz

Pustějov (German: Petrowitz) is a municipality and village in Nový Jičín District in the Moravian-Silesian Region of the Czech Republic. It has about 1,000 inhabitants.

== Demographics ==
Historical population
Year	Pop.	±%
1869	1,126	—
1880	1,085	−3.6%
1890	1,033	−4.8%
1900	1,023	−1.0%
1910	1,093	+6.8%
1921	993	−9.1%
1930	939	−5.4%
1950	798	−15.0%
1961	886	+11.0%
1970	923	+4.2%
1980	981	+6.3%
1991	970	−1.1%
2001	966	−0.4%
2011	969	+0.3%
2021	940	−3.0%
Source: Censuses
