= Kateřinice (Nový Jičín District) =

- Municipality
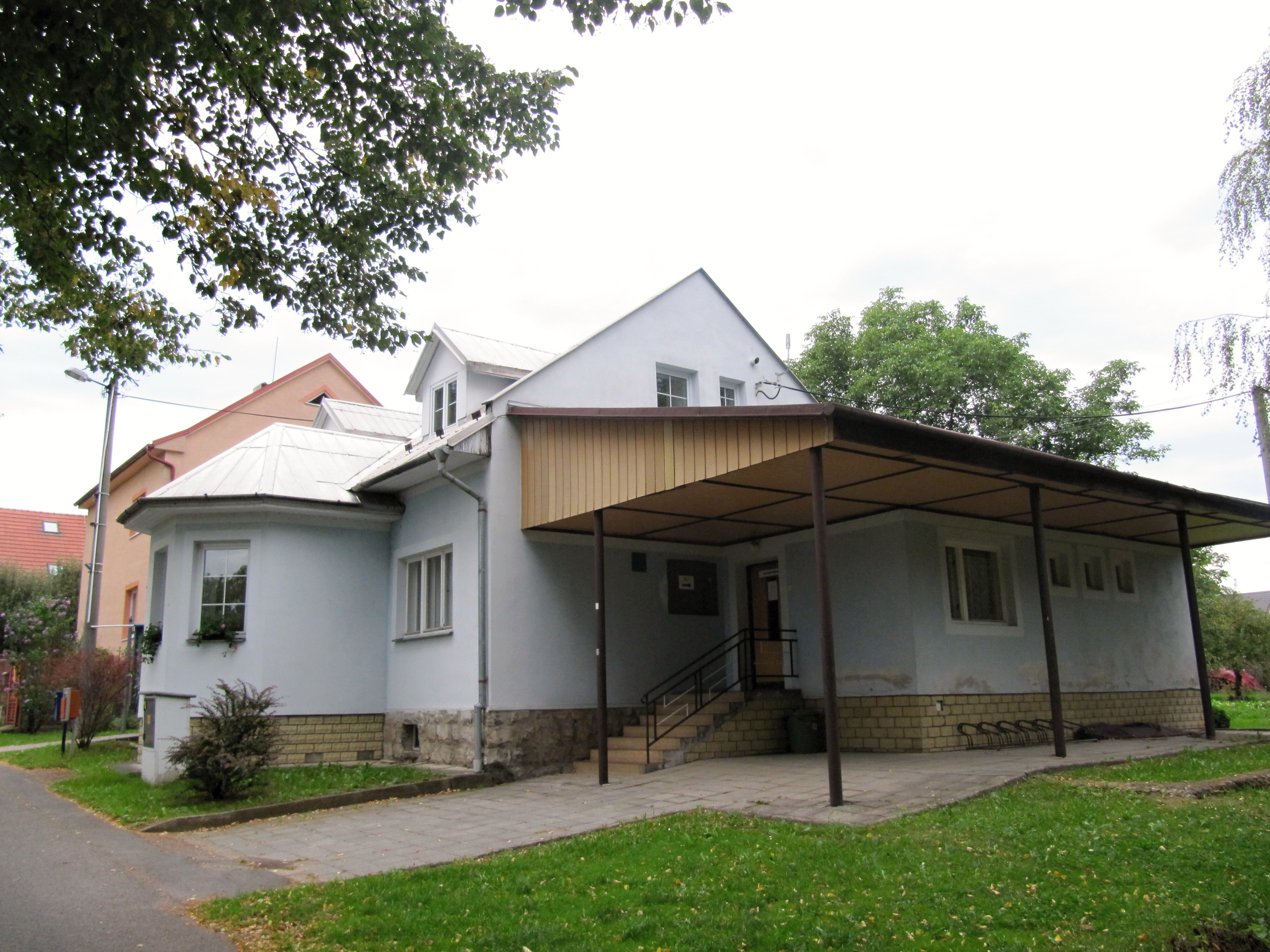
- Municipal office

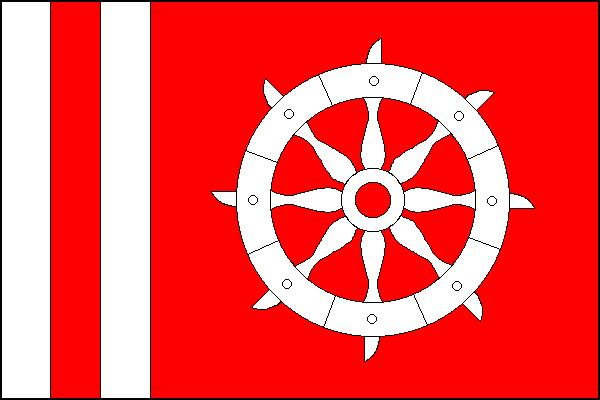
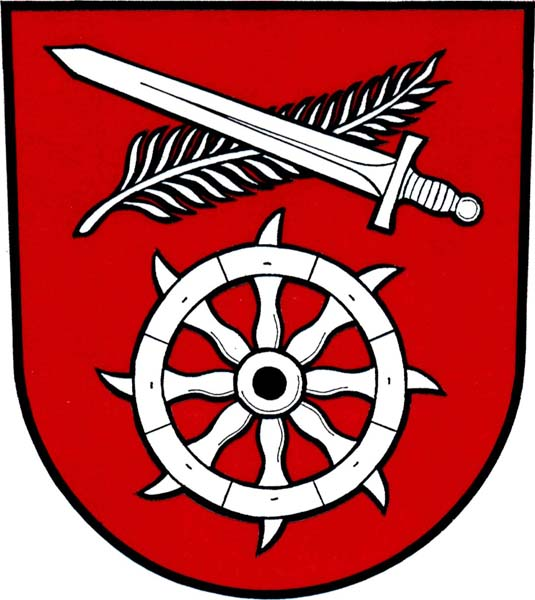
- Flag Coat of arms

- Location in the Czech Republic
- Coordinates: 49°40′9″N 18°11′18″E
- Country: Czech Republic
- Region: Moravian-Silesian
- District: Nový Jičín
- First mentioned: 1358

Area
  - Total: 5.51 km^{2} (2.13 sq mi)
- Elevation: 260 m (850 ft)

Population (2026-01-01)
  - Total: 699
  - Density: 127/km^{2} (329/sq mi)
- Time zone: UTC+1 (CET)
  - Summer (DST): UTC+2 (CEST)
- Postal code: 742 58
- Website: www.katerinice.cz

Kateřinice (German: Kattendorf) is a municipality and village in Nový Jičín District in the Moravian-Silesian Region of the Czech Republic. It has about 700 inhabitants.

== Demographics ==
Historical population
Year	Pop.	±%
1869	496	—
1880	538	+8.5%
1890	508	−5.6%
1900	585	+15.2%
1910	597	+2.1%
1921	596	−0.2%
1930	633	+6.2%
1950	553	−12.6%
1961	626	+13.2%
1970	643	+2.7%
1980	658	+2.3%
1991	622	−5.5%
2001	620	−0.3%
2011	620	+0.0%
2021	686	+10.6%
Source: Censuses
