= Bílov (Nový Jičín District) =

- Municipality
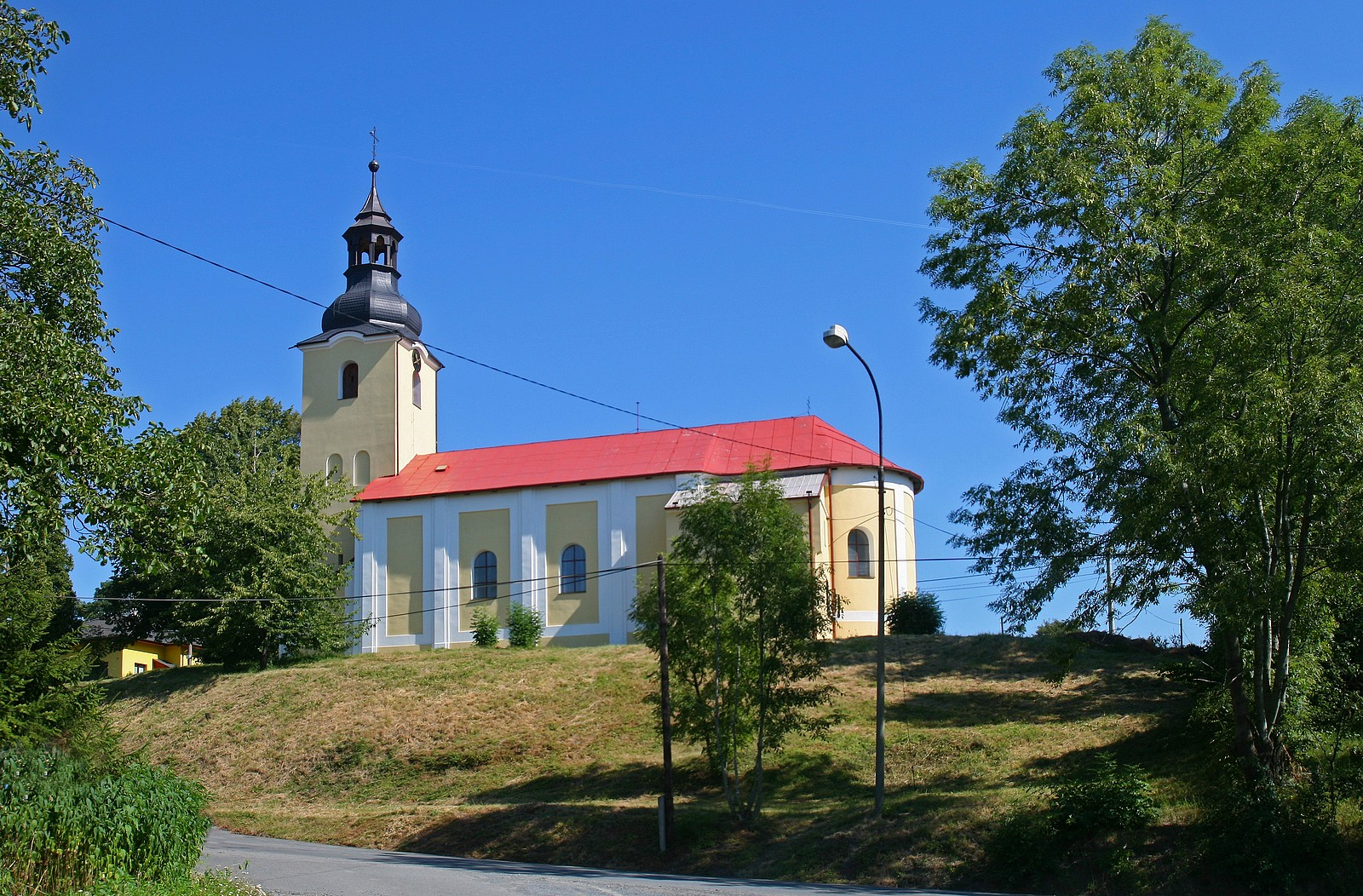
- Church of Saint Lawrence

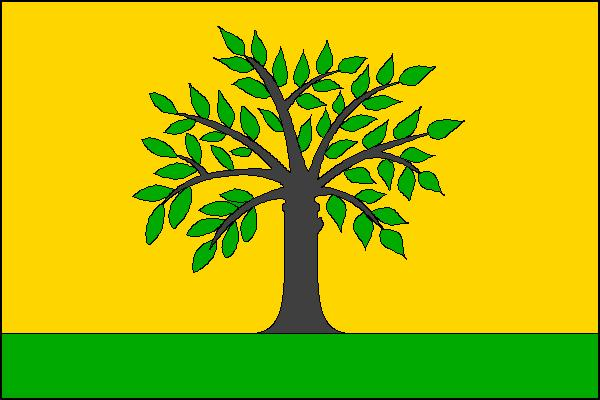
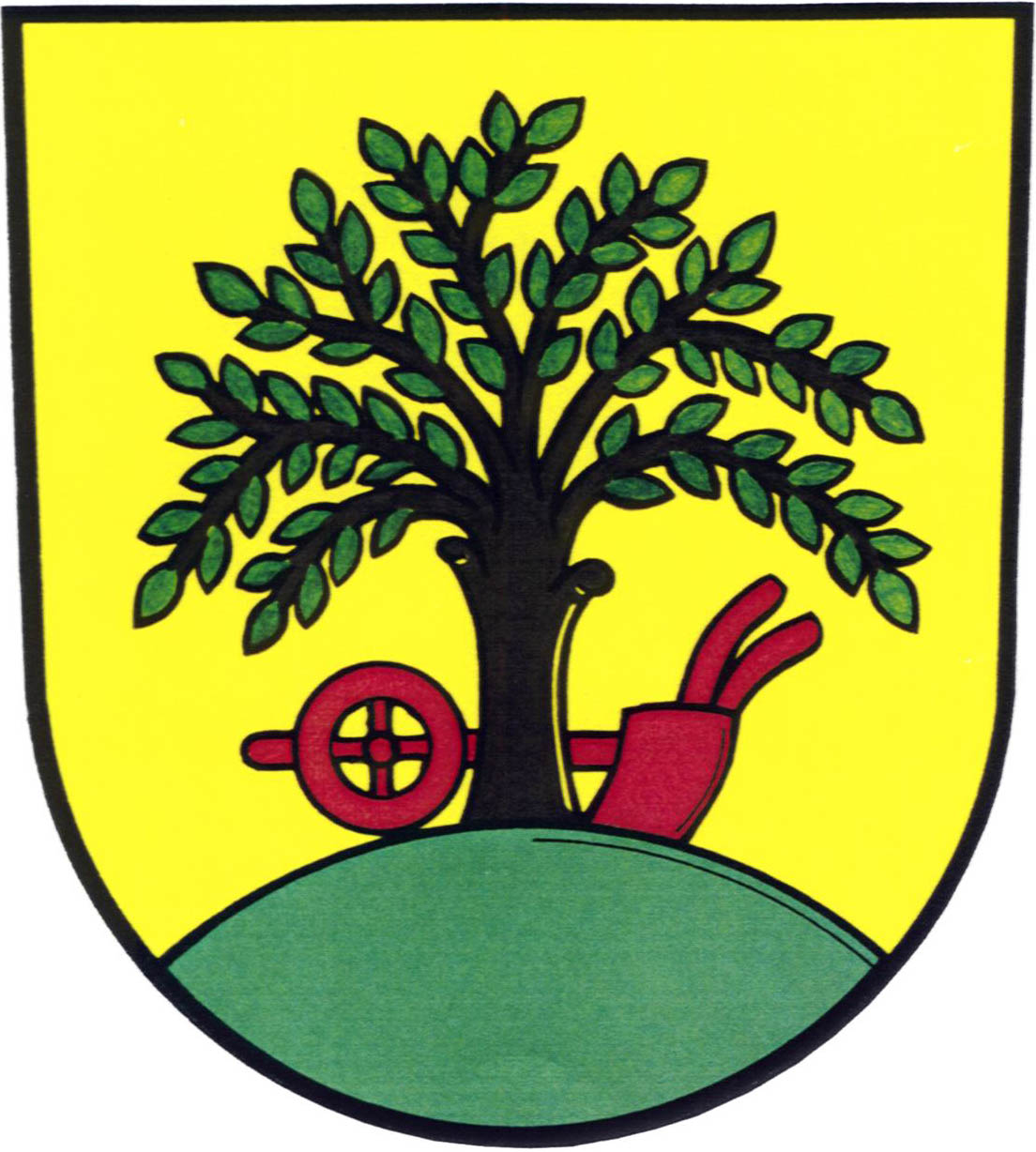
- Flag Coat of arms

- Location in the Czech Republic
- Coordinates: 49°44′3″N 18°0′6″E
- Country: Czech Republic
- Region: Moravian-Silesian
- District: Nový Jičín
- First mentioned: 1329

Area
  - Total: 10.41 km^{2} (4.02 sq mi)
- Elevation: 347 m (1,138 ft)

Population (2026-01-01)
  - Total: 620
  - Density: 60/km^{2} (150/sq mi)
- Time zone: UTC+1 (CET)
  - Summer (DST): UTC+2 (CEST)
- Postal code: 743 01
- Website: www.bilov.cz

Bílov (German: Bielau) is a municipality and village in Nový Jičín District in the Moravian-Silesian Region of the Czech Republic. It has about 600 inhabitants.

== Demographics ==
Historical population
Year	Pop.	±%
1869	736	—
1880	726	−1.4%
1890	698	−3.9%
1900	756	+8.3%
1910	768	+1.6%
1921	726	−5.5%
1930	805	+10.9%
1950	595	−26.1%
1961	594	−0.2%
1970	545	−8.2%
1980	542	−0.6%
1991	475	−12.4%
2001	539	+13.5%
2011	575	+6.7%
2021	594	+3.3%
Source: Censuses
