= Trnávka (Nový Jičín District) =

- Municipality
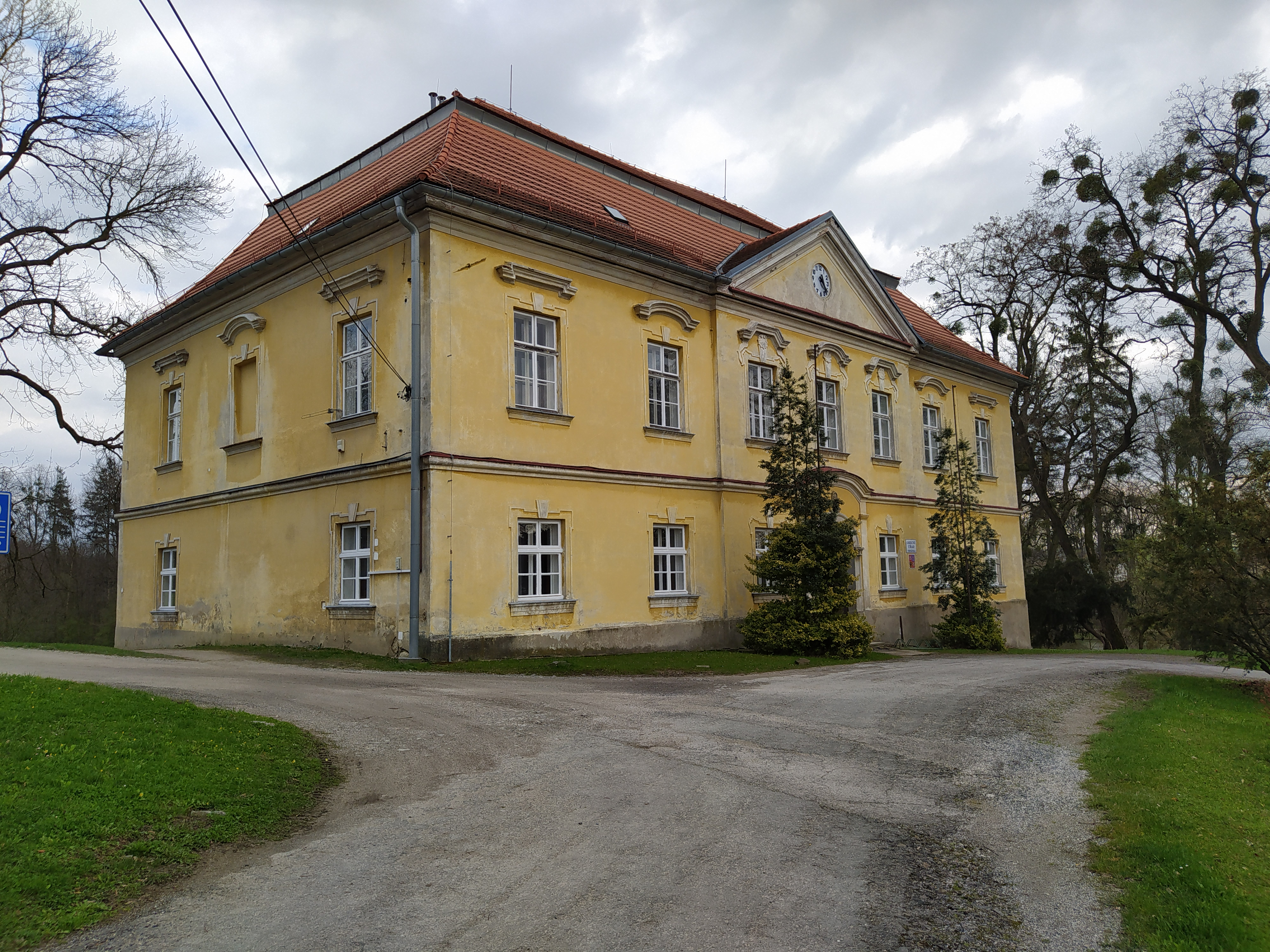
- Trnávka Castle, now municipal office

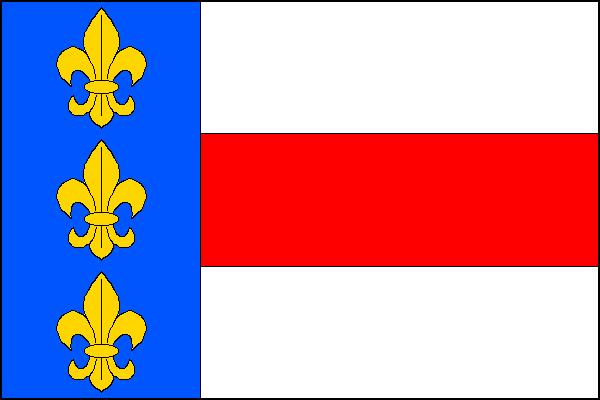
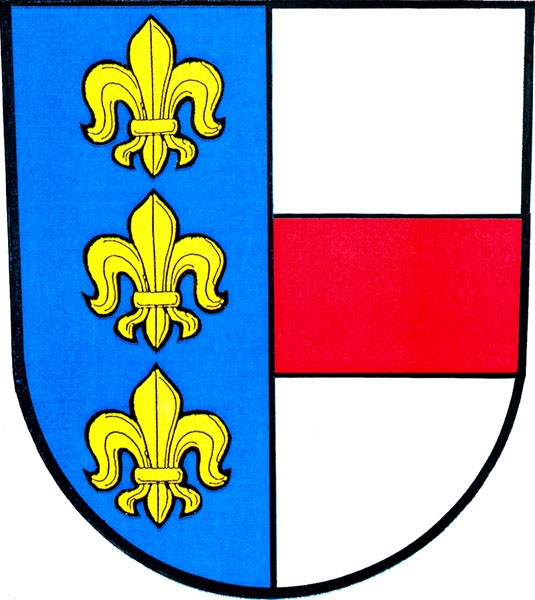
- Flag Coat of arms

- Location in the Czech Republic
- Coordinates: 49°41′5″N 18°10′41″E
- Country: Czech Republic
- Region: Moravian-Silesian
- District: Nový Jičín
- First mentioned: 1307

Area
  - Total: 6.10 km^{2} (2.36 sq mi)
- Elevation: 246 m (807 ft)

Population (2026-01-01)
  - Total: 776
  - Density: 127/km^{2} (329/sq mi)
- Time zone: UTC+1 (CET)
  - Summer (DST): UTC+2 (CEST)
- Postal code: 742 58
- Website: www.trnavka.cz

Trnávka (German: Trnawka) is a municipality and village in Nový Jičín District in the Moravian-Silesian Region of the Czech Republic. It has about 800 inhabitants.

== History ==
The first written mention of Trnávka is from 1307.

== Demographics ==
Historical population
Year	Pop.	±%
1869	540	—
1880	560	+3.7%
1890	535	−4.5%
1900	595	+11.2%
1910	625	+5.0%
1921	549	−12.2%
1930	707	+28.8%
1950	692	−2.1%
1961	743	+7.4%
1970	714	−3.9%
1980	700	−2.0%
1991	654	−6.6%
2001	680	+4.0%
2011	719	+5.7%
2021	726	+1.0%
Source: Censuses

== Sights ==
The main landmark of Trnávka is the Baroque castle from the 18th century with a partially preserved landscape park with a fishpond. The pond and its surroundings is protected as a nature reserve.
