= Skotnice =

- Municipality
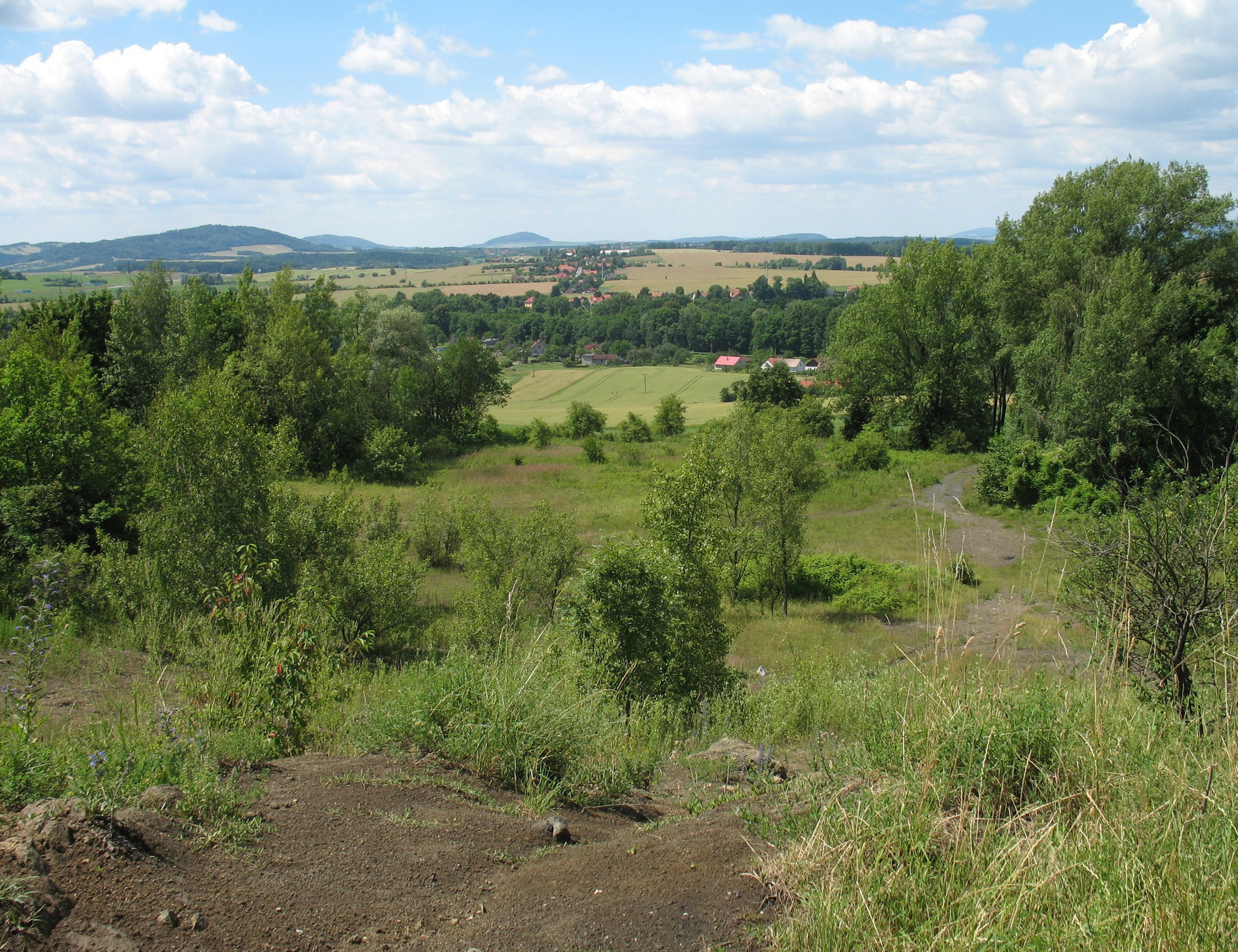
- View of Skotnice from Hončova hůrka

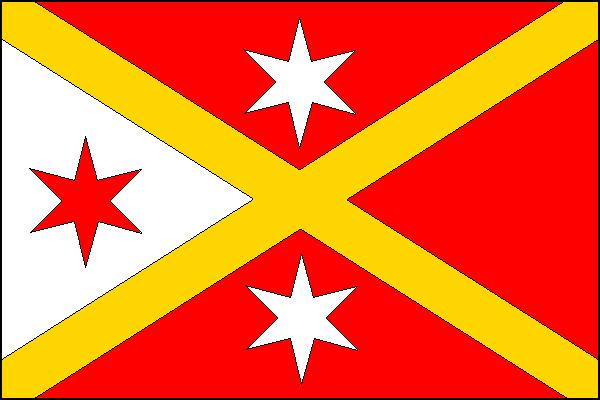
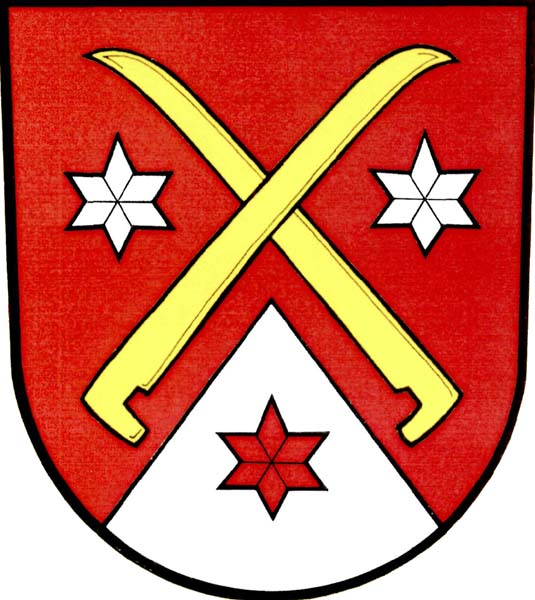
- Flag Coat of arms

- Location in the Czech Republic
- Coordinates: 49°39′27″N 18°8′2″E
- Country: Czech Republic
- Region: Moravian-Silesian
- District: Nový Jičín
- First mentioned: 1330

Area
  - Total: 9.13 km^{2} (3.53 sq mi)
- Elevation: 278 m (912 ft)

Population (2026-01-01)
  - Total: 884
  - Density: 96.8/km^{2} (251/sq mi)
- Time zone: UTC+1 (CET)
  - Summer (DST): UTC+2 (CEST)
- Postal code: 742 59
- Website: www.skotnice.cz

Skotnice (German: Köttnitz) is a municipality and village in Nový Jičín District in the Moravian-Silesian Region of the Czech Republic. It has about 900 inhabitants.

== Demographics ==
Historical population
Year	Pop.	±%
1869	894	—
1880	901	+0.8%
1890	860	−4.6%
1900	926	+7.7%
1910	969	+4.6%
1921	901	−7.0%
1930	1,023	+13.5%
1950	872	−14.8%
1961	839	−3.8%
1970	735	−12.4%
1980	699	−4.9%
1991	668	−4.4%
2001	651	−2.5%
2011	697	+7.1%
2021	826	+18.5%
Source: Censuses
