= Bravantice =

- Municipality
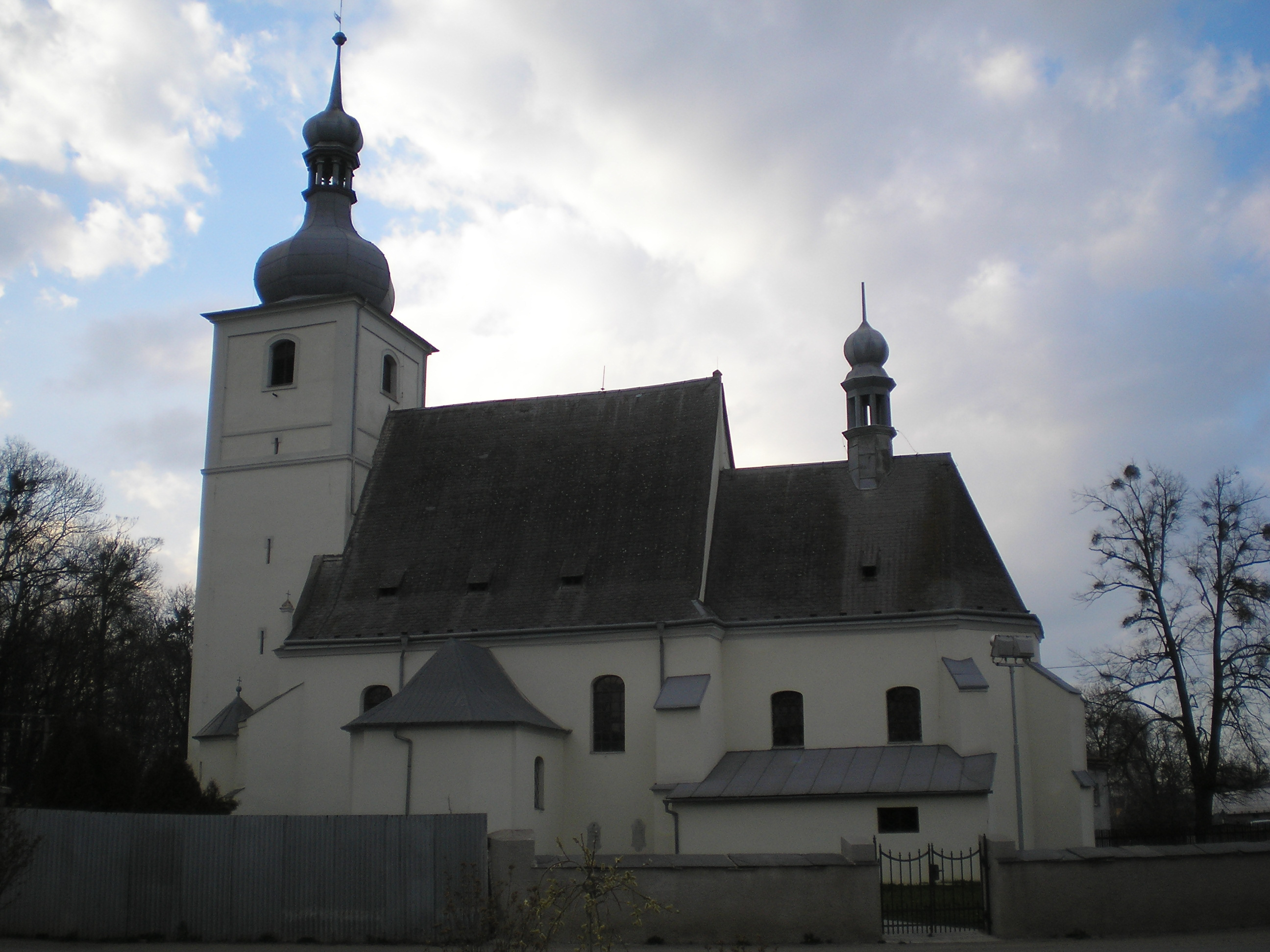
- Church of Saint Valentine

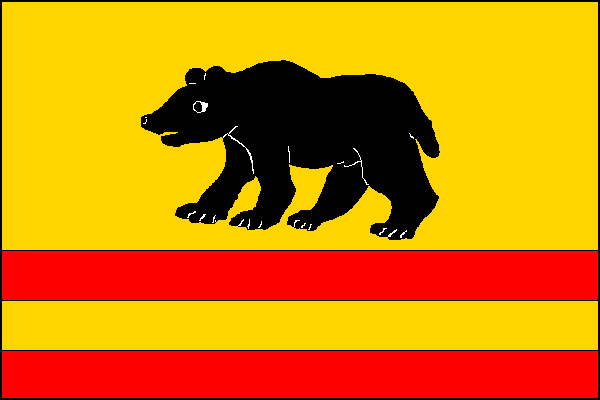
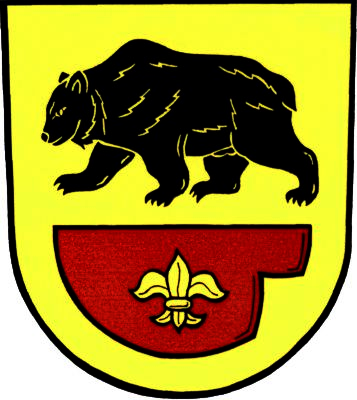
- Flag Coat of arms

- Location in the Czech Republic
- Coordinates: 49°45′26″N 18°4′58″E
- Country: Czech Republic
- Region: Moravian-Silesian
- District: Nový Jičín
- First mentioned: 1370

Area
  - Total: 11.36 km^{2} (4.39 sq mi)
- Elevation: 243 m (797 ft)

Population (2026-01-01)
  - Total: 1,082
  - Density: 95.25/km^{2} (246.7/sq mi)
- Time zone: UTC+1 (CET)
  - Summer (DST): UTC+2 (CEST)
- Postal code: 742 81
- Website: www.bravantice.cz

Bravantice (German: Brosdorf) is a municipality and village in Nový Jičín District in the Moravian-Silesian Region of the Czech Republic. It has about 1,100 inhabitants.

== Demographics ==
Historical population
Year	Pop.	±%
1869	1,181	—
1880	1,196	+1.3%
1890	1,182	−1.2%
1900	1,260	+6.6%
1910	1,183	−6.1%
1921	1,120	−5.3%
1930	1,187	+6.0%
1950	867	−27.0%
1961	859	−0.9%
1970	816	−5.0%
1980	864	+5.9%
1991	714	−17.4%
2001	793	+11.1%
2011	832	+4.9%
2021	953	+14.5%
Source: Censuses
