= Luboměř =

- Municipality
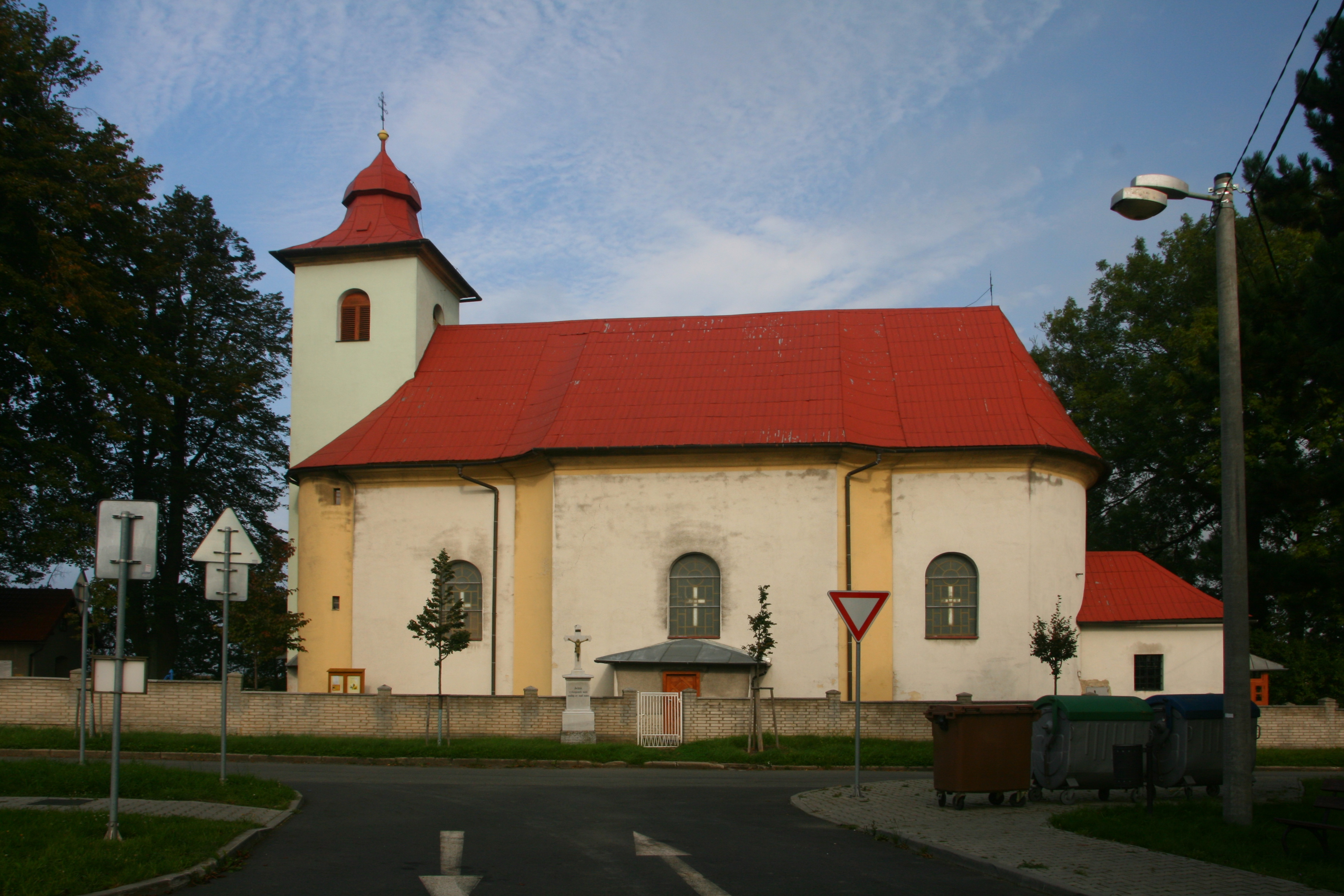
- Church of Saint Lawrence

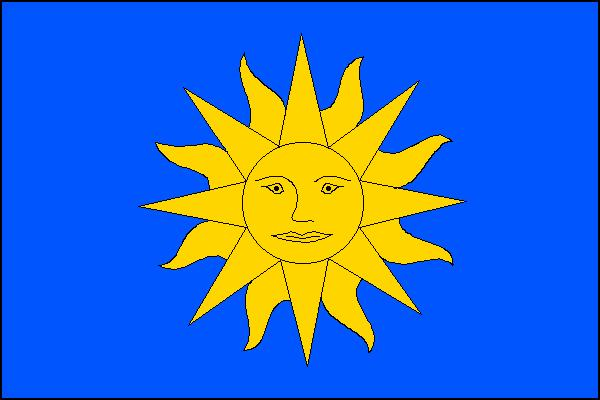
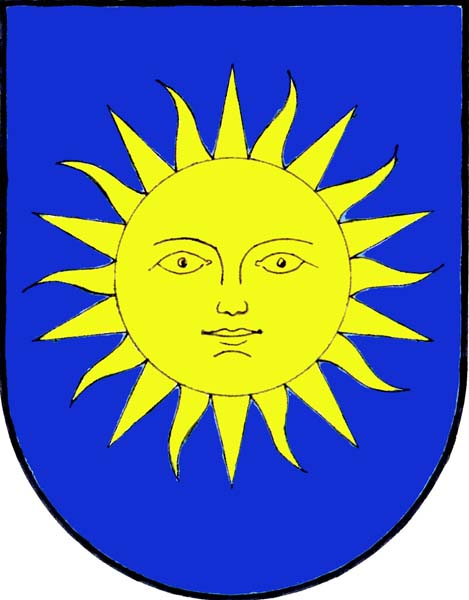
- Flag Coat of arms

- Location in the Czech Republic
- Coordinates: 49°41′19″N 17°42′23″E
- Country: Czech Republic
- Region: Moravian-Silesian
- District: Nový Jičín
- First mentioned: 1394

Area
  - Total: 7.63 km^{2} (2.95 sq mi)
- Elevation: 546 m (1,791 ft)

Population (2026-01-01)
  - Total: 387
  - Density: 50.7/km^{2} (131/sq mi)
- Time zone: UTC+1 (CET)
  - Summer (DST): UTC+2 (CEST)
- Postal code: 742 37
- Website: www.lubomer.cz

Luboměř (German: Laudmer) is a municipality and village in Nový Jičín District in the Moravian-Silesian Region of the Czech Republic. It has about 400 inhabitants.

== Administrative division ==
Luboměř consists of two municipal parts (in brackets population according to the 2021 census):

- Luboměř (328)
- Heltínov (45)

== Demographics ==
Historical population
Year	Pop.	±%
1869	727	—
1880	699	−3.9%
1890	661	−5.4%
1900	681	+3.0%
1910	637	−6.5%
1921	619	−2.8%
1930	622	+0.5%
1950	463	−25.6%
1961	479	+3.5%
1970	447	−6.7%
1980	431	−3.6%
1991	440	+2.1%
2001	411	−6.6%
2011	364	−11.4%
2021	373	+2.5%
Source: Censuses
