= Vrchy =

- Municipality
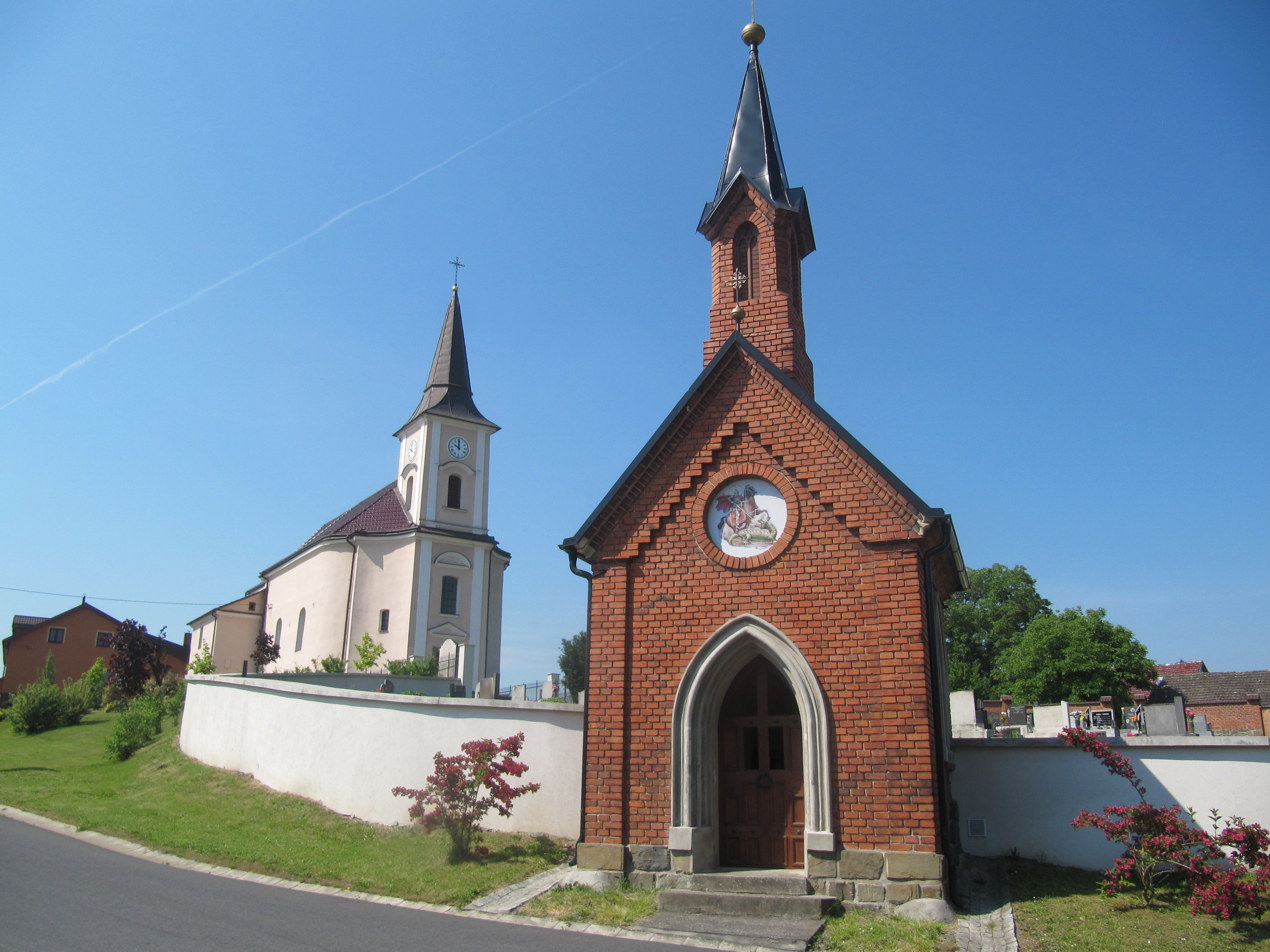
- Chapel and Church of Saint George

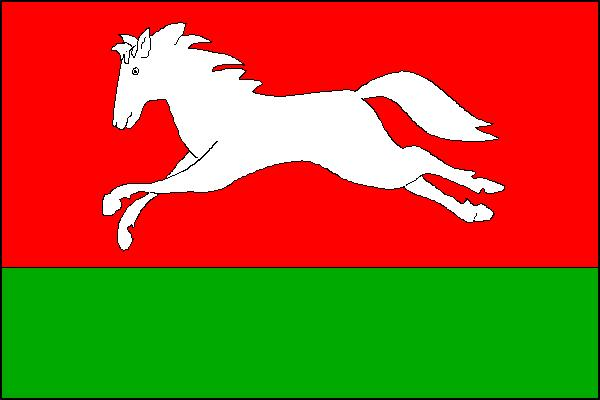
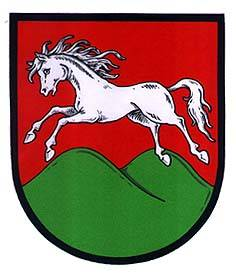
- Flag Coat of arms

- Location in the Czech Republic
- Coordinates: 49°45′4″N 17°52′16″E
- Country: Czech Republic
- Region: Moravian-Silesian
- District: Nový Jičín
- First mentioned: 1437

Area
  - Total: 10.54 km^{2} (4.07 sq mi)
- Elevation: 474 m (1,555 ft)

Population (2026-01-01)
  - Total: 223
  - Density: 21.2/km^{2} (54.8/sq mi)
- Time zone: UTC+1 (CET)
  - Summer (DST): UTC+2 (CEST)
- Postal code: 742 45
- Website: www.obec-vrchy.cz

Vrchy (until 1947 Valtéřovice; German: Waltersdorf) is a municipality and village in Nový Jičín District in the Moravian-Silesian Region of the Czech Republic. It has about 200 inhabitants.

== Demographics ==
Historical population
Year	Pop.	±%
1869	546	—
1880	569	+4.2%
1890	541	−4.9%
1900	543	+0.4%
1910	583	+7.4%
1921	526	−9.8%
1930	501	−4.8%
1950	311	−37.9%
1961	273	−12.2%
1970	235	−13.9%
1980	217	−7.7%
1991	230	+6.0%
2001	229	−0.4%
2011	195	−14.8%
2021	213	+9.2%
Source: Censuses
