= Bordovice =

- Municipality
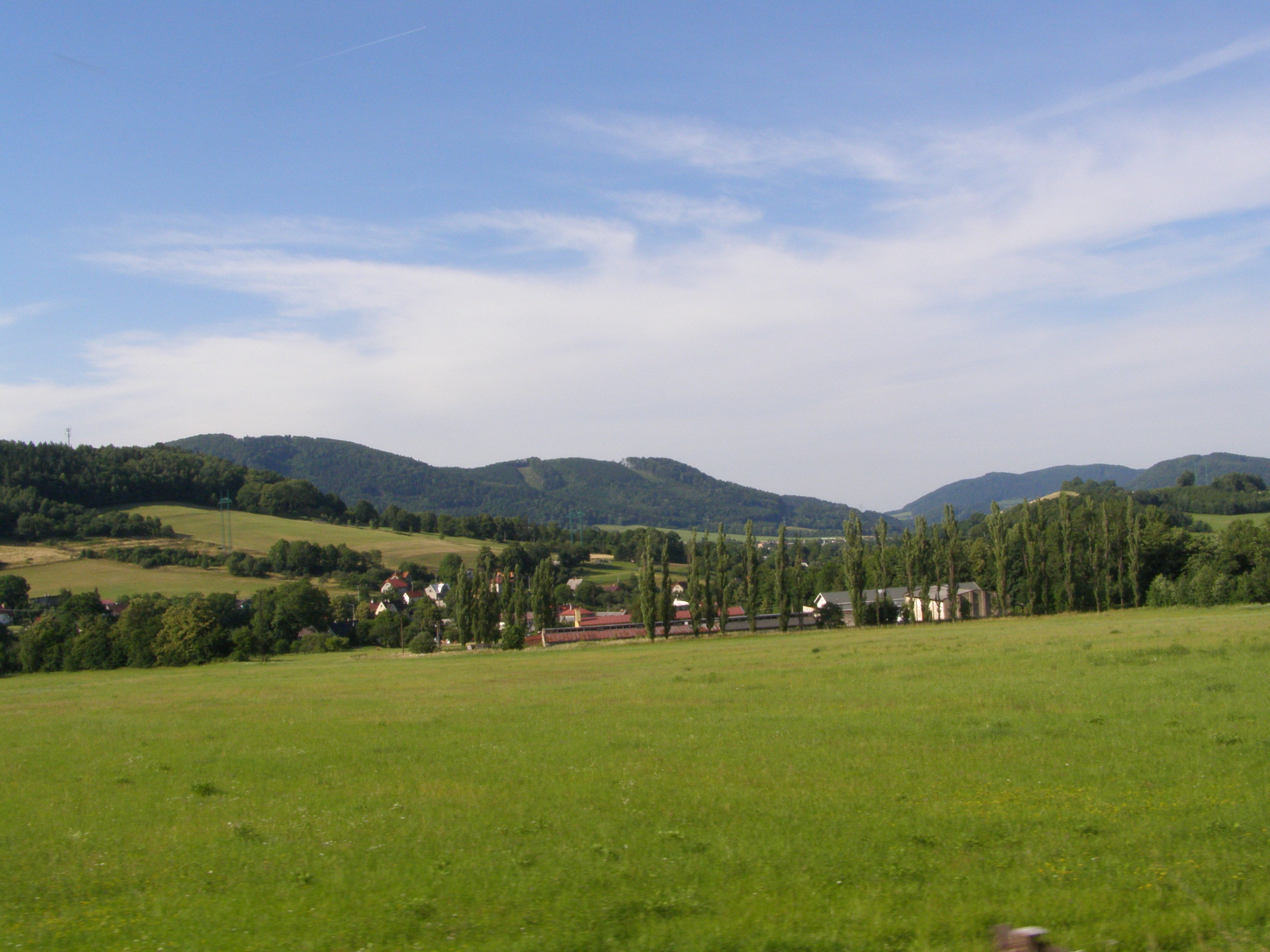
- View towards the village

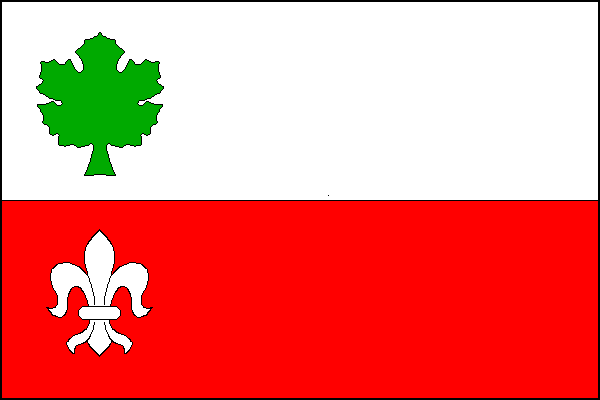
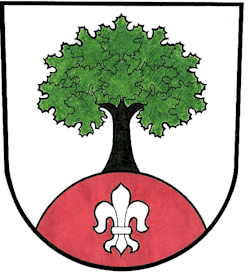
- Flag Coat of arms

- Location in the Czech Republic
- Coordinates: 49°32′49″N 18°9′10″E
- Country: Czech Republic
- Region: Moravian-Silesian
- District: Nový Jičín
- First mentioned: 1581

Area
  - Total: 6.30 km^{2} (2.43 sq mi)
- Elevation: 390 m (1,280 ft)

Population (2026-01-01)
  - Total: 671
  - Density: 107/km^{2} (276/sq mi)
- Time zone: UTC+1 (CET)
  - Summer (DST): UTC+2 (CEST)
- Postal code: 744 01
- Website: www.bordovice.cz

Bordovice (German: Bordowitz) is a municipality and village in Nový Jičín District in the Moravian-Silesian Region of the Czech Republic. It has about 700 inhabitants.

== Demographics ==
Historical population
Year	Pop.	±%
1869	397	—
1880	447	+12.6%
1890	455	+1.8%
1900	501	+10.1%
1910	523	+4.4%
1921	520	−0.6%
1930	590	+13.5%
1950	511	−13.4%
1961	601	+17.6%
1970	610	+1.5%
1980	581	−4.8%
1991	544	−6.4%
2001	539	−0.9%
2011	559	+3.7%
2021	617	+10.4%
Source: Censuses
