= Bernartice nad Odrou =

- Municipality
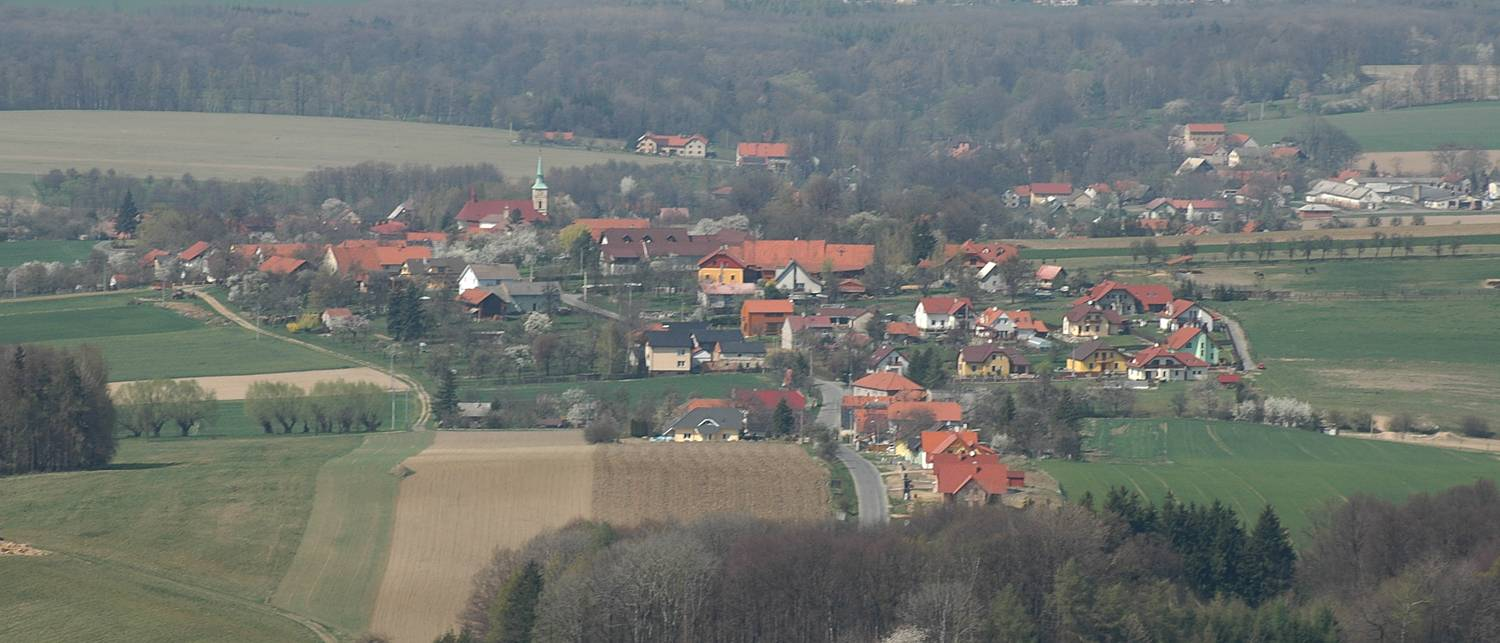
- General view

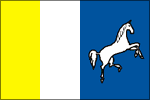
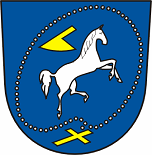
- Flag Coat of arms

- Location in the Czech Republic
- Coordinates: 49°36′36″N 17°56′52″E
- Country: Czech Republic
- Region: Moravian-Silesian
- District: Nový Jičín
- First mentioned: 1374

Area
  - Total: 9.57 km^{2} (3.69 sq mi)
- Elevation: 280 m (920 ft)

Population (2026-01-01)
  - Total: 1,000
  - Density: 100/km^{2} (270/sq mi)
- Time zone: UTC+1 (CET)
  - Summer (DST): UTC+2 (CEST)
- Postal code: 742 41
- Website: www.bernarticenadodrou.cz

Bernartice nad Odrou (German: Barnsdorf) is a municipality and village in Nový Jičín District in the Moravian-Silesian Region of the Czech Republic. It has about 1,000 inhabitants.

== Demographics ==
Historical population
| Year | Pop. | ±% |
|---|---|---|
| 1869 | 715 | — |
| 1880 | 794 | +11.0% |
| 1890 | 817 | +2.9% |
| 1900 | 832 | +1.8% |
| 1910 | 871 | +4.7% |
| 1921 | 837 | −3.9% |
| 1930 | 942 | +12.5% |
| 1950 | 691 | −26.6% |
| 1961 | 775 | +12.2% |
| 1970 | 752 | −3.0% |
| 1980 | 747 | −0.7% |
| 1991 | 730 | −2.3% |
| 2001 | 792 | +8.5% |
| 2011 | 926 | +16.9% |
| 2021 | 941 | +1.6% |
Source: Censuses
