= Nový Jičín District =

Nový Jičín District Okres Nový Jičín
- District
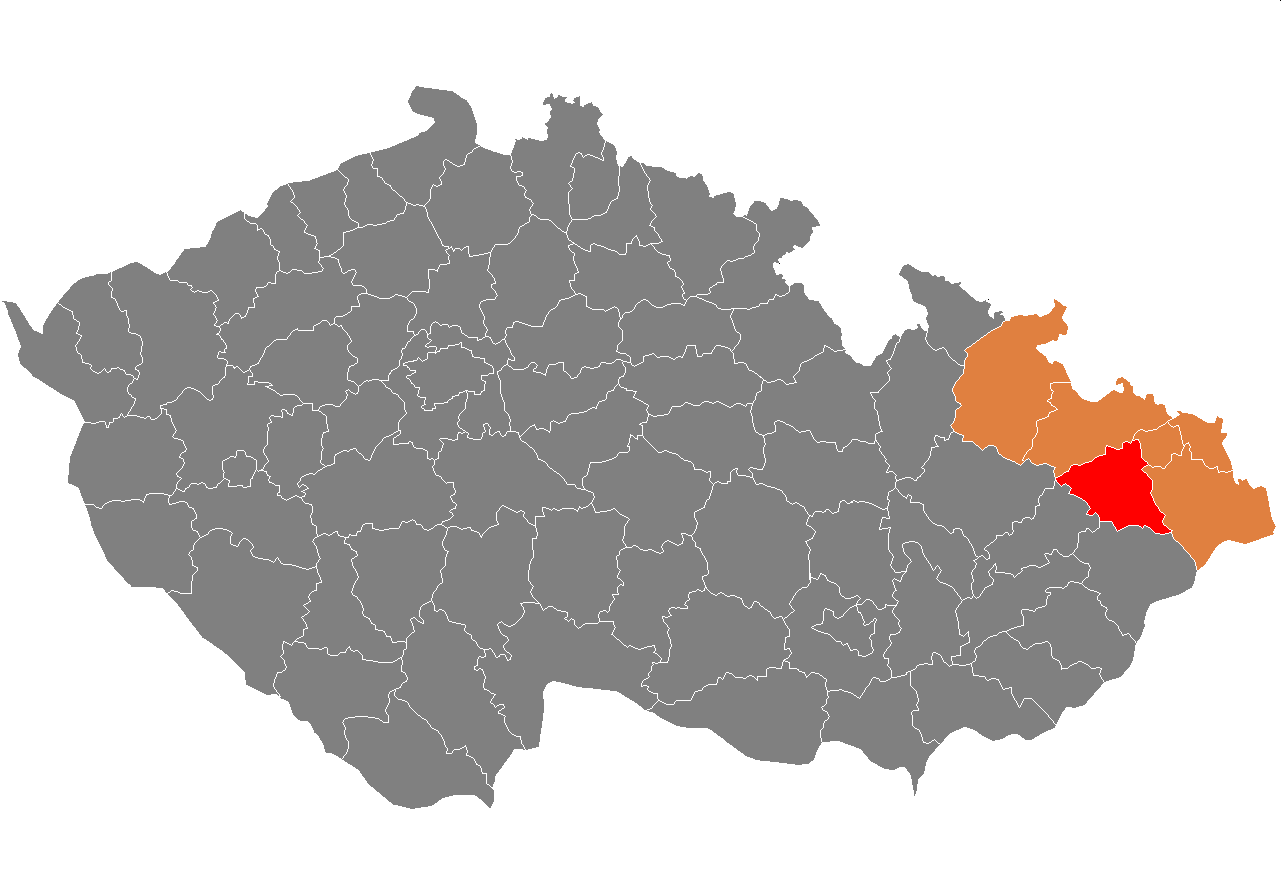
- Location in the Moravian-Silesian Region within the Czech Republic
- Coordinates: 49°39′N 18°1′E
- Country: Czech Republic
- Region: Moravian-Silesian
- Capital: Nový Jičín

Area
  - Total: 881.85 km^{2} (340.48 sq mi)

Population (2026)
  - Total: 150,834
  - Density: 171.04/km^{2} (443.00/sq mi)
- Time zone: UTC+1 (CET)
  - Summer (DST): UTC+2 (CEST)
- Municipalities: 54
- * Towns: 9
- * Market towns: 2

Nový Jičín District (Czech: okres Nový Jičín) is a district in the Moravian-Silesian Region of the Czech Republic. Its capital is the town of Nový Jičín.

== Administrative division ==
Nový Jičín District is divided into five administrative districts of municipalities with extended competence: Nový Jičín, Bílovec, Frenštát pod Radhoštěm, Kopřivnice and Odry.

=== List of municipalities ===
Towns are marked in bold and market towns in italics:

Albrechtičky - Bartošovice - Bernartice nad Odrou - Bílov - Bílovec - Bítov - Bordovice - Bravantice - Frenštát pod Radhoštěm - Fulnek - Heřmanice u Oder - Heřmánky - Hladké Životice - Hodslavice - Hostašovice - Jakubčovice nad Odrou - Jeseník nad Odrou - Jistebník - Kateřinice - Kopřivnice - Kujavy - Kunín - Libhošť - Lichnov - Luboměř - Mankovice - Mořkov - Mošnov - Nový Jičín - Odry - Petřvald - Příbor - Pustějov - Rybí - Sedlnice - Šenov u Nového Jičína - Skotnice - Slatina - Spálov - Starý Jičín - Štramberk - Studénka - Suchdol nad Odrou - Tichá - Tísek - Trnávka - Trojanovice - Velké Albrechtice - Veřovice - Vražné - Vrchy - Závišice - Ženklava - Životice u Nového Jičína

== Geography ==
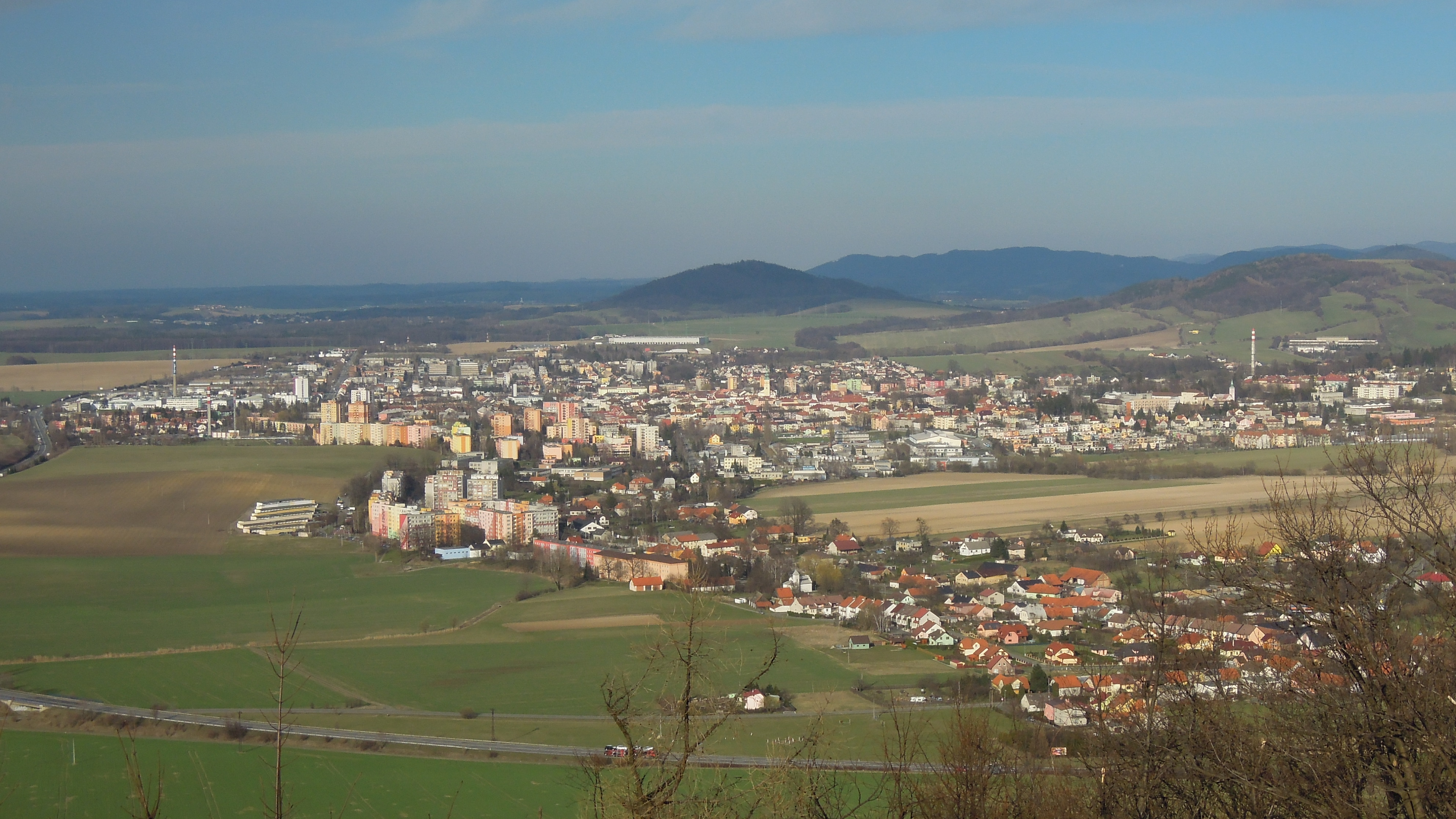
Nový Jičín and surrounding landscape

The terrain is very varied. While the axis of the territory is formed by a lowland, in the north it turns into highlands and in the south it turns into mountains. The territory extends into four geomorphological mesoregions: Nízký Jeseník (north), Moravian Gate (centre), Moravian-Silesian Foothills (centre), and Moravian-Silesian Beskids (south). The highest point of the district is the mountain Radhošť in Trojanovice with an elevation of 1,129 m (3,704 ft). The lowest point of the district is the river bed of the Oder in Jistebník at 221 m (725 ft).

From the total district area of 881.9 km^{2} (340.5 sq mi), agricultural land occupies 558.3 km^{2} (215.6 sq mi), forests occupy 203.9 km^{2} (78.7 sq mi), and water area occupies 18.5 km^{2} (7.1 sq mi). Forests cover 23.1% of the district's area.

The most important river is the Oder, which flows across the district from west to east. Its most important tributaries in the district are the Jičínka and Bílovka. The Oder river valley is rich in ponds, otherwise there are not many bodies of water.

The southern part of the territory is protected as the Beskydy Protected Landscape Area. The central part of the territory along the Oder River is protected as the Poodří Protected Landscape Area.

== Demographics ==
Historical population

Year	Pop.	±%
1869	104,879	—
1880	108,611	+3.6%
1890	112,537	+3.6%
1900	119,075	+5.8%
1910	129,511	+8.8%

Year	Pop.	±%
1921	123,377	−4.7%
1930	130,567	+5.8%
1950	110,343	−15.5%
1961	126,155	+14.3%
1970	133,176	+5.6%

Year	Pop.	±%
1980	146,740	+10.2%
1991	151,802	+3.4%
2001	152,766	+0.6%
2011	148,074	−3.1%
2021	146,366	−1.2%

Source: Censuses

=== Most populous municipalities ===
Name	Population	Area (km^{2})
Nový Jičín	22,740	37
Kopřivnice	21,245	27
Frenštát pod Radhoštěm	10,495	11
Studénka	9,166	31
Příbor	8,311	22
Bílovec	7,349	39
Odry	7,336	74
Fulnek	5,436	68
Štramberk	3,478	9
Starý Jičín	3,007	34

== Economy ==
The largest employers with headquarters in Nový Jičín District and at least 1,000 employees are:

Economic entity	Location	Number of employees	Main activity
Brose CZ	Kopřivnice	2,500–2,999	Manufacture of parts for motor vehicles
PO Lighting Czech	Šenov u Nového Jičína	2,000–2,499	Manufacture of lighting for motor vehicles
Tatra Trucks	Kopřivnice	1,500–1,999	Manufacture of motor vehicles
AGEL Hospital Nový Jičín	Nový Jičín	1,500–1,999	Health care
Mobis Automotive System Czech	Mošnov	1,000–1,499	Manufacture of parts for motor vehicles
Plakor Czech	Mošnov	1,000–1,499	Automotive industry
Hanon Systems Autopal	Nový Jičín	1,000–1,499	Manufacture of parts for motor vehicles

== Transport ==
The D1 motorway from Brno to Ostrava and the D48 motorway (part of the European route E462) from Nový Jičín to the Czech–Polish border pass through the district.

== Sights ==
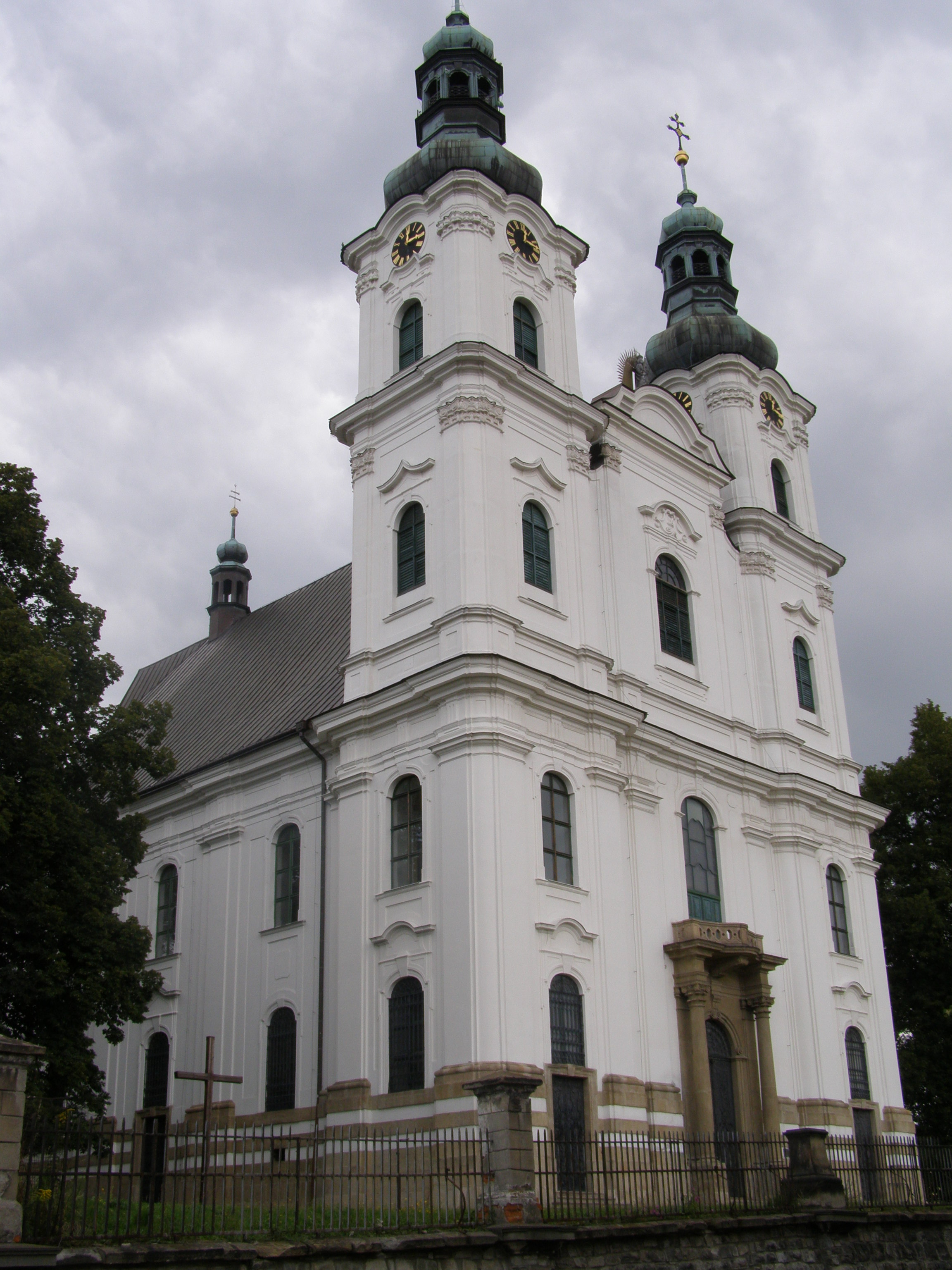
Basilica of the Visitation of Our Lady in Frýdek-Místek

The most important monuments in the district, protected as national cultural monuments, are:

- Moravian Church meeting house in Fulnek
- Birthplace of František Palacký in Hodslavice
- Slovenská strela train in Tatra Technical Museum in Kopřivnice

The best-preserved settlements, protected as monument reservations and monument zones, are:

- Nový Jičín (monument reservation)
- Příbor (monument reservation)
- Štramberk (monument reservation)
- Bílovec
- Frenštát pod Radhoštěm
- Fulnek
- Odry

The most visited tourist destinations are the Stezka Valašska treetop walkway near Pustevny and Tatra Technical Museum in Kopřivnice.
