= Heřmánky =

- Municipality
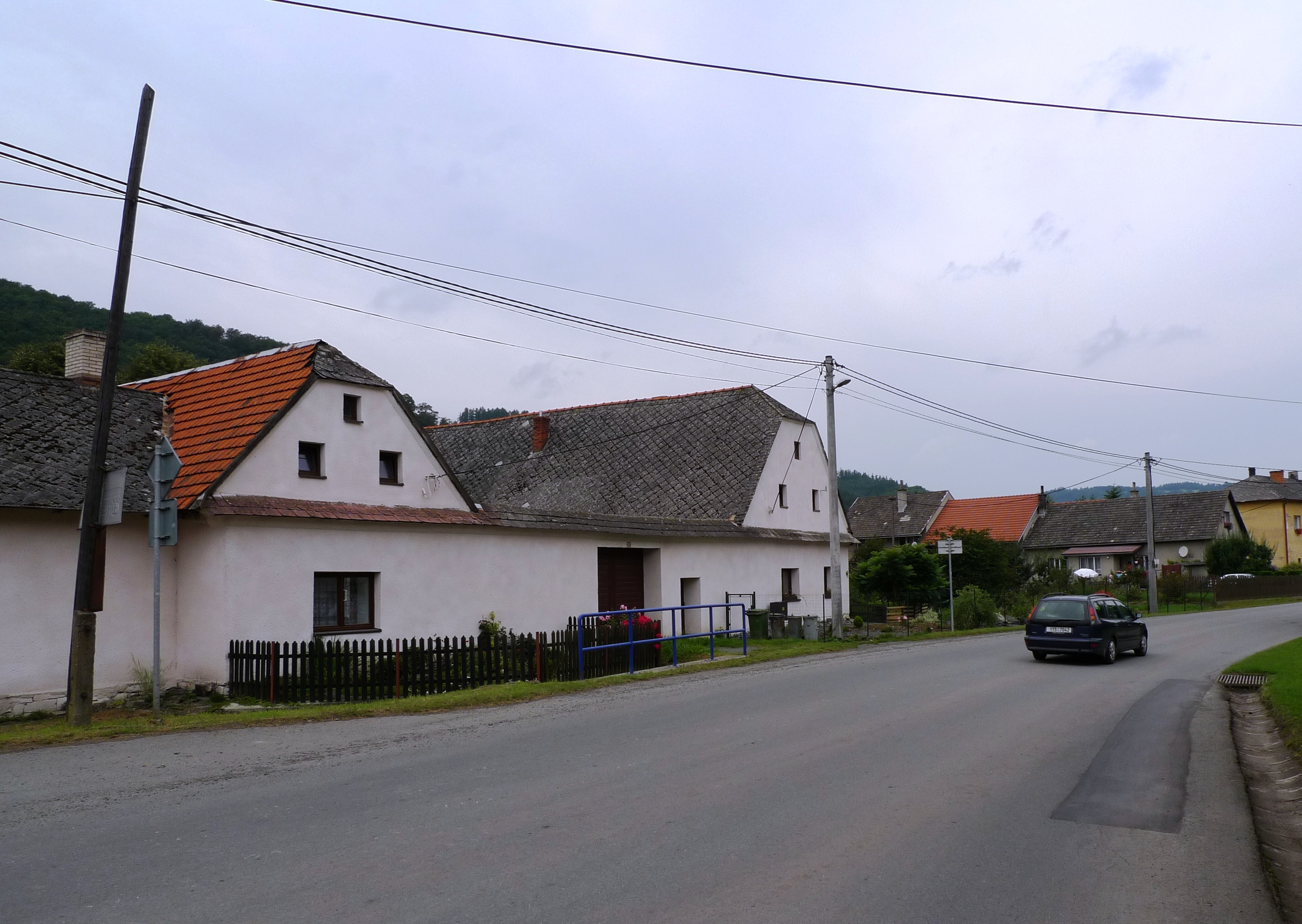
- Houses in the village

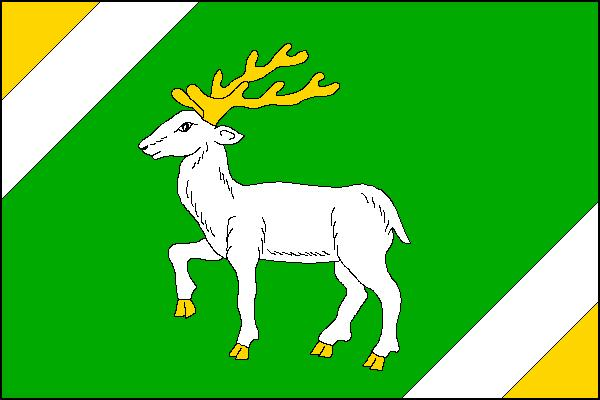
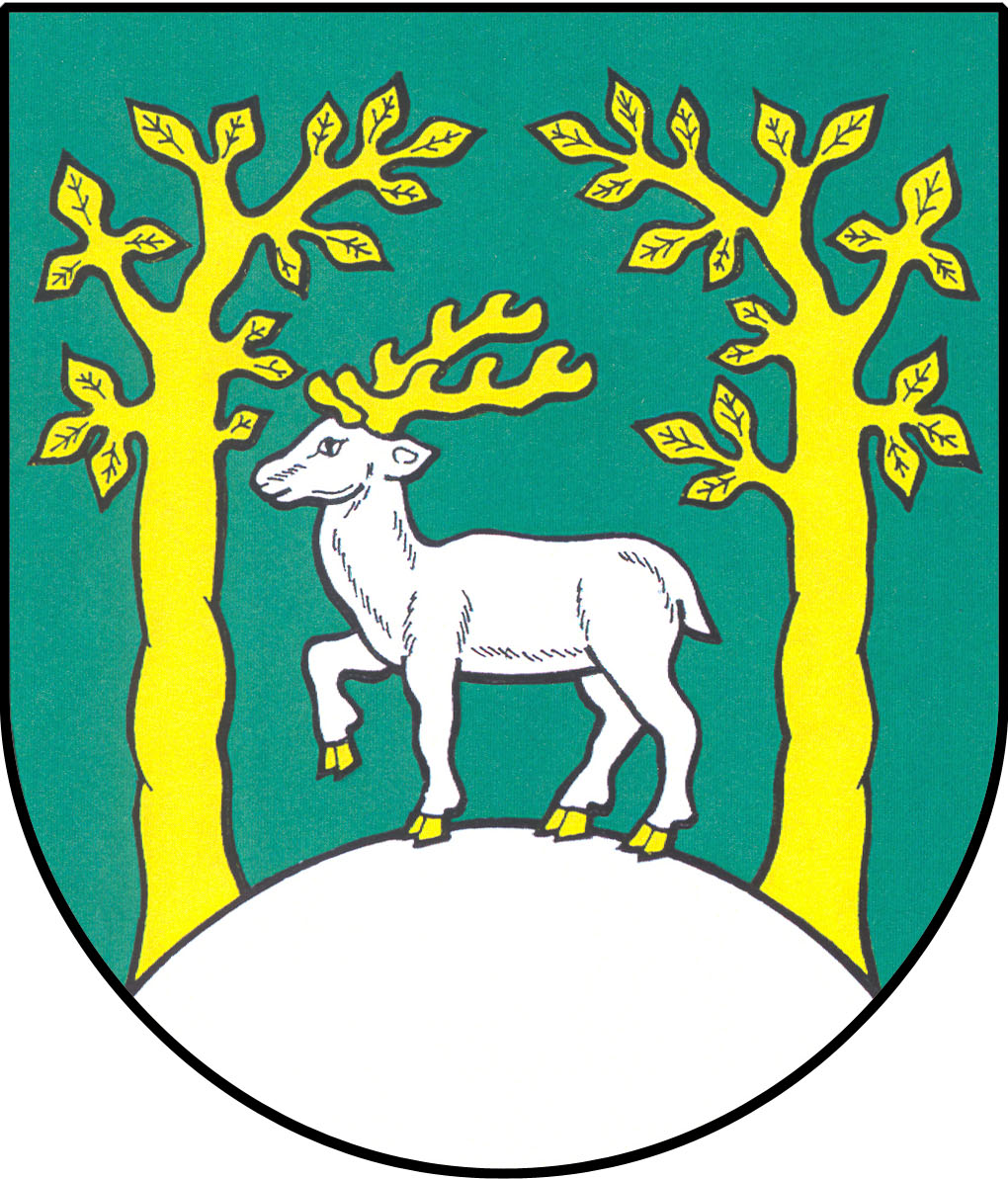
- Flag Coat of arms

- Location in the Czech Republic
- Coordinates: 49°42′25″N 17°46′6″E
- Country: Czech Republic
- Region: Moravian-Silesian
- District: Nový Jičín
- First mentioned: 1362

Area
  - Total: 3.31 km^{2} (1.28 sq mi)
- Elevation: 324 m (1,063 ft)

Population (2026-01-01)
  - Total: 175
  - Density: 52.9/km^{2} (137/sq mi)
- Time zone: UTC+1 (CET)
  - Summer (DST): UTC+2 (CEST)
- Postal code: 742 35
- Website: www.obec-hermanky.cz

Heřmánky (German: Hermsdorf) is a municipality and village in Nový Jičín District in the Moravian-Silesian Region of the Czech Republic. It has about 200 inhabitants.

== History ==
The first written mention of Heřmánky is from 1362.

== Demographics ==
Historical population
Year	Pop.	±%
1869	179	—
1880	176	−1.7%
1890	258	+46.6%
1900	223	−13.6%
1910	251	+12.6%
1921	234	−6.8%
1930	239	+2.1%
1950	206	−13.8%
1961	218	+5.8%
1970	229	+5.0%
1980	193	−15.7%
1991	153	−20.7%
2001	157	+2.6%
2011	162	+3.2%
2021	172	+6.2%
Source: Censuses
