= Dolní Bečva =

- Municipality
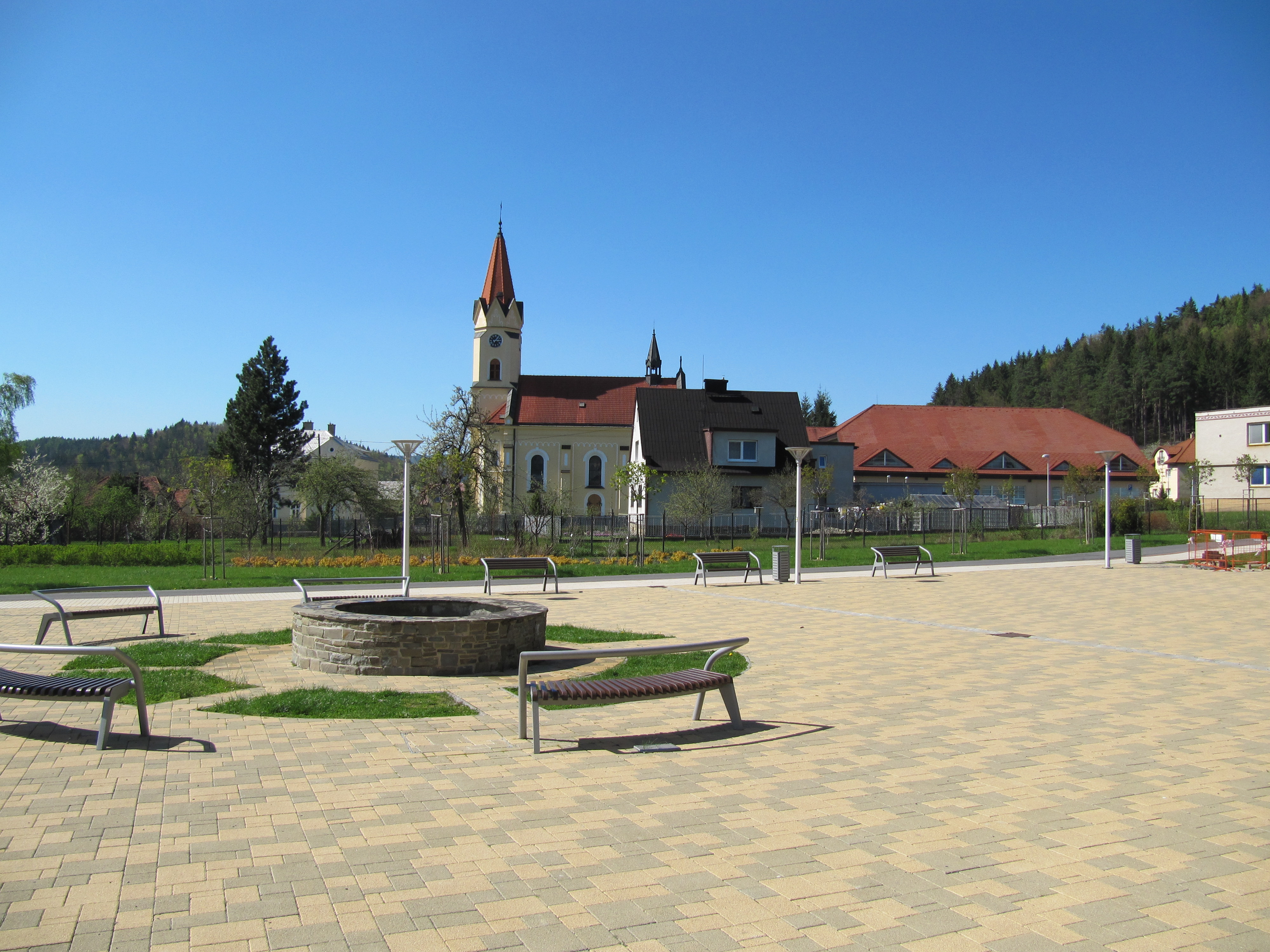
- Common in Dolní Bečva

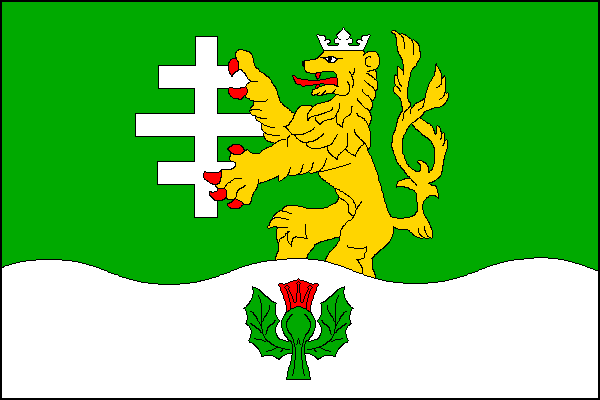
- Flag Coat of arms

- Location in the Czech Republic
- Coordinates: 49°27′18″N 18°11′39″E
- Country: Czech Republic
- Region: Zlín
- District: Vsetín
- First mentioned: 1597

Area
  - Total: 20.04 km^{2} (7.74 sq mi)
- Elevation: 427 m (1,401 ft)

Population (2026-01-01)
  - Total: 1,919
  - Density: 95.76/km^{2} (248.0/sq mi)
- Time zone: UTC+1 (CET)
  - Summer (DST): UTC+2 (CEST)
- Postal code: 756 55
- Website: www.dolnibecva.cz

Dolní Bečva is a municipality and village in Vsetín District in the Zlín Region of the Czech Republic. It has about 1,900 inhabitants.

== Geography ==
Dolní Bečva is located about 19 kilometres (12 mi) northeast of Vsetín and 38 km (24 mi) south of Ostrava. It lies on the border between the Moravian-Silesian Beskids mountain range and the Rožnov Furrow valley. The highest point is the Radhošť mountain at 1,129 m (3,704 ft) above sea level, whose peak lies on the municipal border. The municipality is situated on the right bank of the Rožnovská Bečva River.

== History ==
The first written mention of Dolní Bečva is from 1597.

== Demographics ==
Historical population

Year	Pop.	±%
1869	1,547	—
1880	1,559	+0.8%
1890	1,395	−10.5%
1900	1,595	+14.3%
1910	1,501	−5.9%

Year	Pop.	±%
1921	1,448	−3.5%
1930	1,591	+9.9%
1950	1,381	−13.2%
1961	1,673	+21.1%
1970	1,746	+4.4%

Year	Pop.	±%
1980	1,743	−0.2%
1991	1,762	+1.1%
2001	1,772	+0.6%
2011	1,800	+1.6%
2021	1,831	+1.7%

Source: Censuses

== Transport ==
The I/35 road (part of the European route E442) from Valašské Meziříčí to the Czech–Slovak border runs through the municipality.

== Sights ==
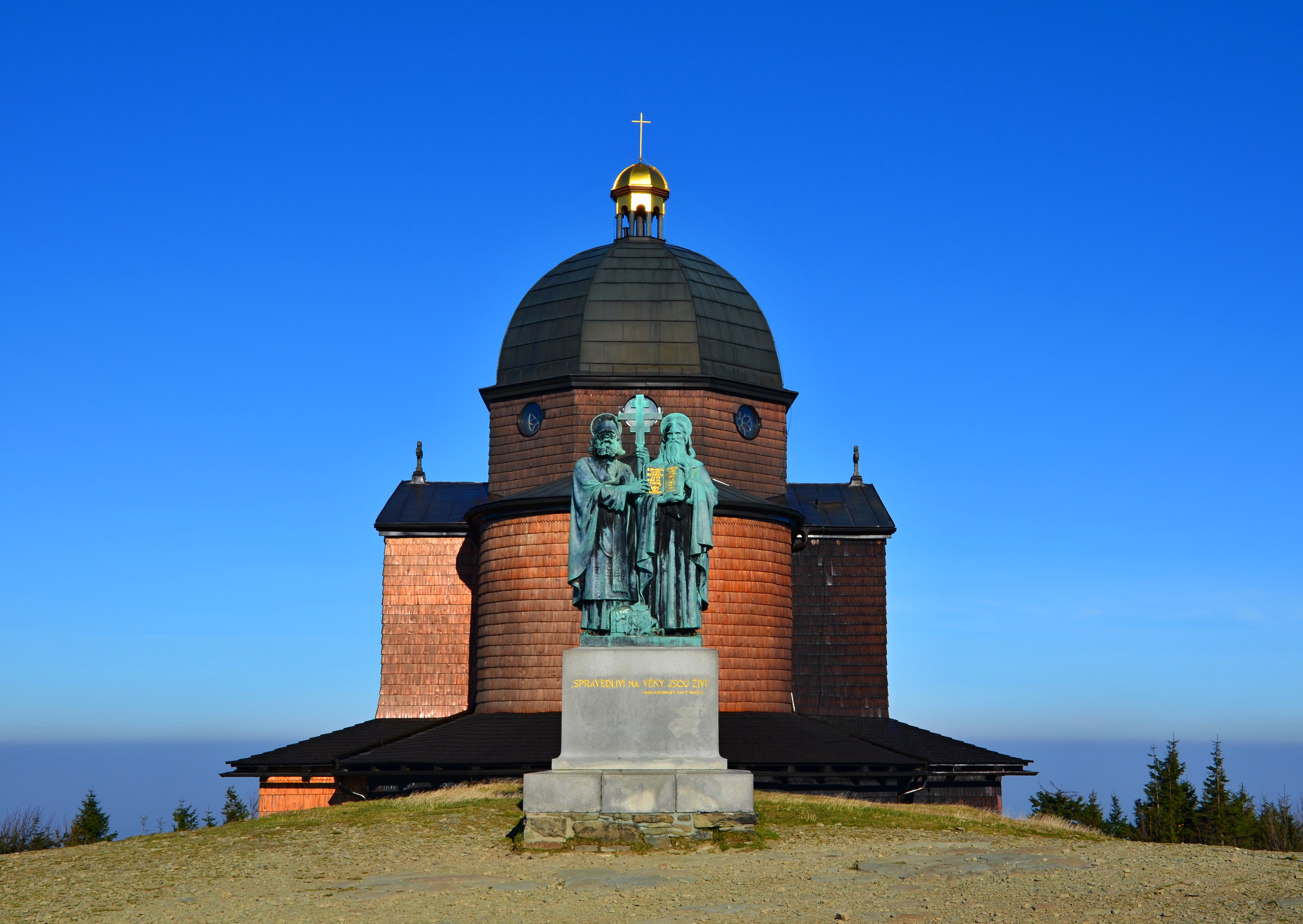
Chapel and sculpture of Saints Cyril and Methodius on Radhošť

In the centre of Dolní Bečva is the Church of Saint Anthony of Padua. It was built in the Neo-Romanesque style in 1906.

On the Radhošť mountain there are the Chapel of Saints Cyril and Methodius and the Radegast statue by Albin Polasek (the original from 1931 was replaced with a copy in 1998).

== Twin towns – sister cities ==
Dolní Bečva is twinned with:

- Kamenec pod Vtáčnikom, Slovakia
