= Radhošť =

Coordinates: 49.491840°N 18.222786°E

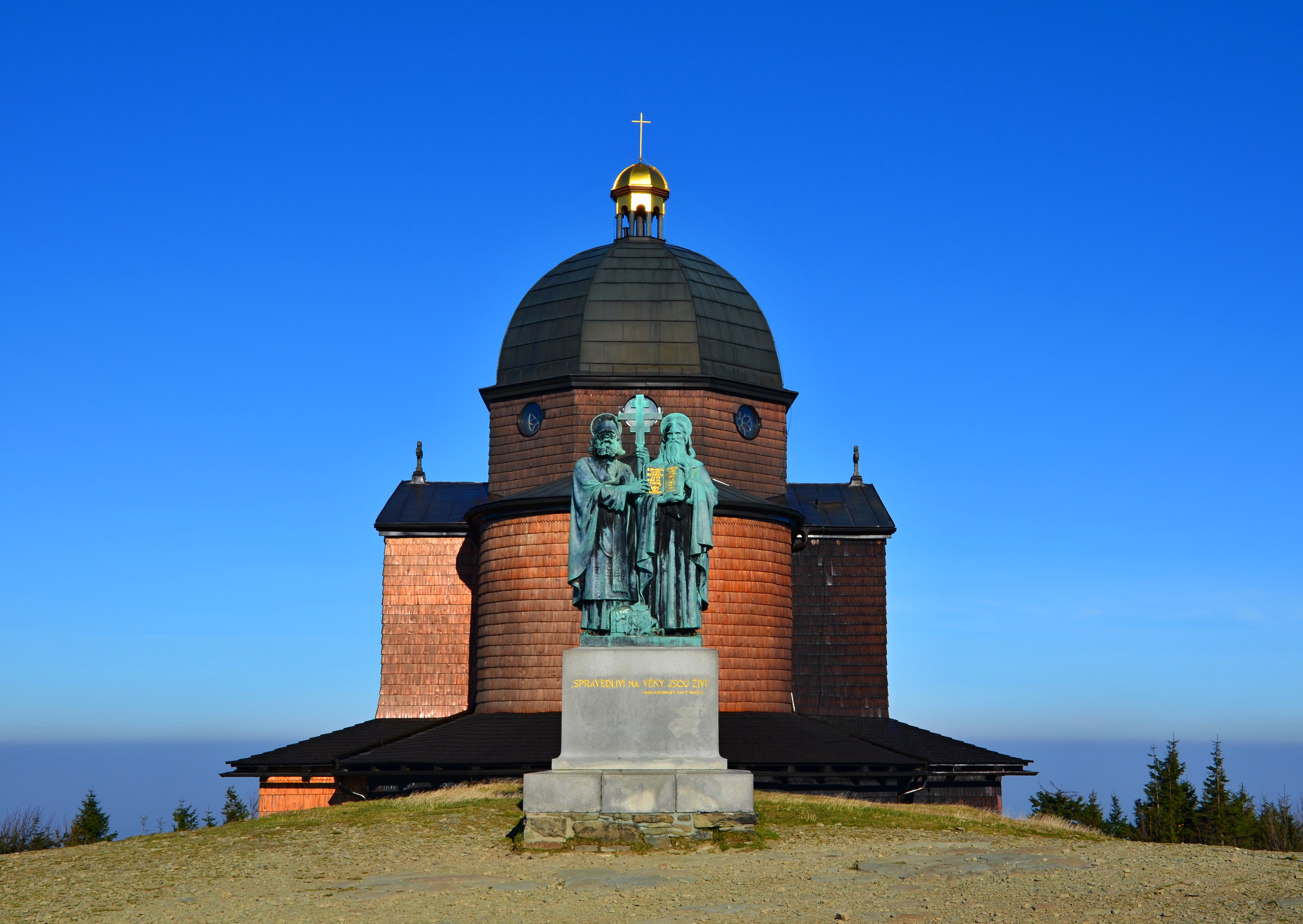
Sculpture of Saints Cyril and Methodius, and the chapel

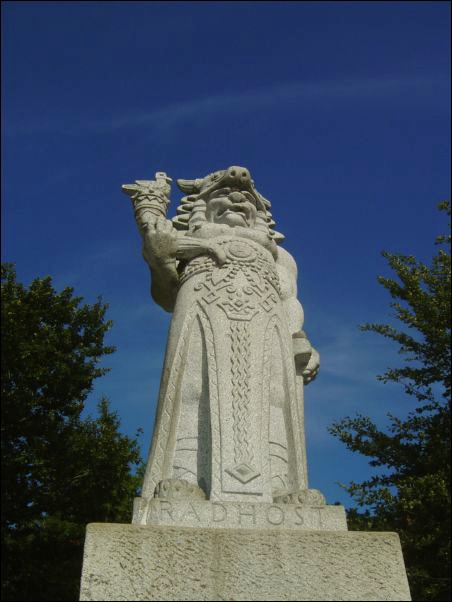
Statue of Radegast

Radhošť (Czech pronunciation: [ˈradɦoʃc]) is a mountain in the Czech Republic. It has an elevation of 1,129 metres (3,704 ft) and belongs to the Moravian-Silesian Beskids mountain range. It is located in Dolní Bečva and Trojanovice municipalities in the Zlín and Moravian-Silesian regions, whose border runs along the ridge of the mountain.

== Buildings and monuments ==
A chapel built in 1898 and a sculpture of Saints Cyril and Methodius are located on the summit to glorify their evangelization of Slavic people. The mountain is a popular destination for religious pilgrimages. Referred to as the place of Slavic god Radegast, Radhošť was the host of sacred ceremonies to rejoice the god during the time of Slavic antiquity. The name Radhošť is in fact a Czech version of the name of Radegast.

There is a Sierra trail to mountain Pustevny with the sculpture of god Radegast on the way.

=== Symbolism of sculpture ===
The sculpture of Saints Cyril and Methodius was created by Czech-American sculptor Albin Polasek, head of the sculpture department of the Art Institute of Chicago at the time. The three-meter statue stands before a chapel earlier dedicated to the pagan god, Radegast. The broken idols at the feet of the saints stands for the work these 9th century missionaries did in overthrowing idolatry. They brought the Christian faith to Bohemia, Moravia, and Slovakia – later united as Czechoslovakia. In addition to the idols, there is a triple cross, which also known as the Slavic Cross, a variation of the Orthodox cross. The final major symbol is the book that Saint Cyril (on the right) is holding. Saint Cyril is credited with creating the eponymous Cyrillic script or Early Cyrillic alphabet.

A similar statue exists at the Cathedral of Saint Paul, National Shrine of the Apostle Paul in Saint Paul, Minnesota, United States. This statue of commissioned by Archbishiop Austin Dowling in 1926 as a shrine for the Slavic immigrants in Saint Paul. This statue at Radhošť served as a suitable model for the one in Saint Paul.

== Nature ==
The northern slopes are protected as a national nature reserve.
