= Radegast (god) =

Slavic god

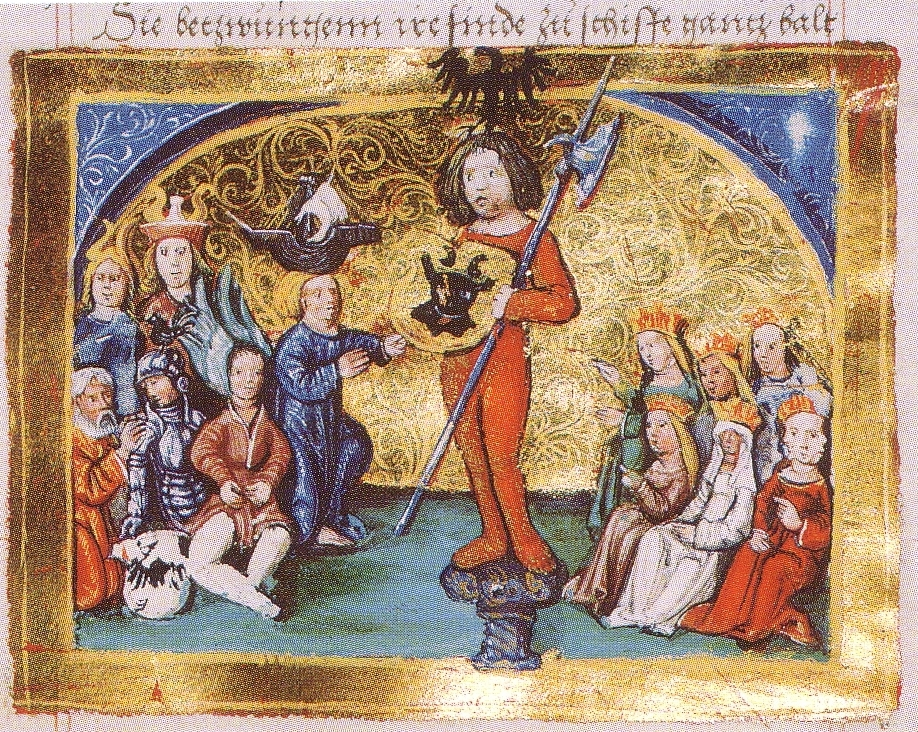
An early 16th century depiction of Radegast in George Spalatin's Chronicle of Saxony and Thuringia

Radegast or Radogost is, according to medieval chroniclers, the god of the Polabian Slavs, whose temple was located in Rethra. In modern academic literature, however, the dominant view is that Radegast is a local nickname or a local alternative name of the solar god Svarozhits, who, according to earlier sources, was the chief god of Rethra. Some researchers also believe that the name of the town, where Svarozhits was the main deity, was mistakenly taken for a theonym. A popular local legend in the Czech Republic is related to Radegast.

== Sources ==
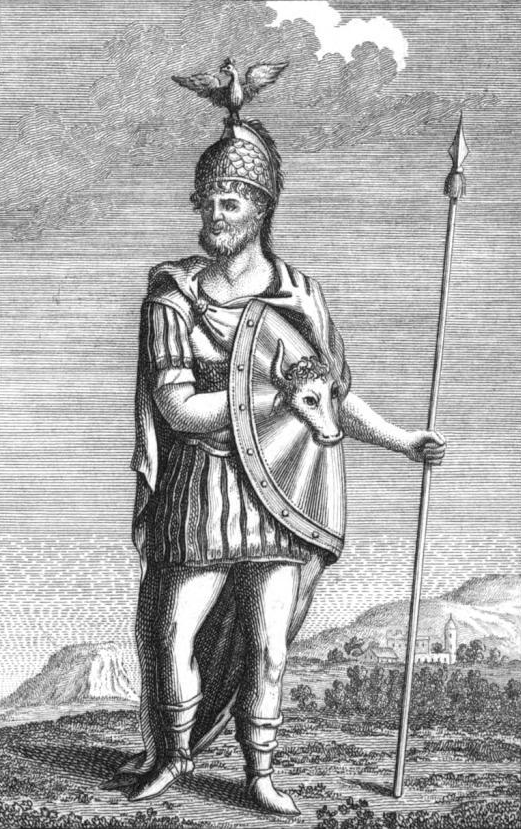
A depiction of Radegast according to Andrey Sergeevich Kaisarov

The first source mentioning this theonym is the Gesta Hammaburgensis ecclesiae pontificum by Adam of Bremen:

The elderly Bishop John, captured with other Christians in the city of Mecklenburg, was kept alive to be exhibited in triumph. And consequently, lashed with whips for having confessed to Christ, he was then paraded in each of the cities of the Slavs to be mocked, as he could not be forced to renounce the name of Christ, his hands and feet were cut off and his body was thrown into the street, but not before removing his head, which the pagans stuck on a pike and offered to their god Radegast as proof of victory. These events occurred in Rethra, the capital of the Slavs, the fourth day before the ides of November.

[...]

Among them, situated in the middle, are the extremely powerful Redarii, whose famous capital is Rethra, a seat of idolatry. There is a large temple built there, dedicated to the demons, whose prince is Radogost. His statue is made of gold, his baldachin bedecked with purple.

— Adam of Bremen, Gesta Hammaburgensis ecclesiae pontificum

Following Adam, Radegast is also mentioned by Helmold in his Chronicle of the Slavs, who writes about making annual sacrifices to him and using an oracle associated with his temple, he also calls him "the god of the Obodrites". It is also mentioned in the Annales Augustani of 1135, which tells of the destruction of Rethra by Burchard II, Bishop of Halberstadt, who took the local "horse worshipped as a god" on which he returned to Saxony. The last source mentioning Radegast is the Passion of the Martyrs of Ebstorf.

== Etymology and interpretations ==
In Latin sources, this name is noted as Redigost, Redigast, Riedegost, Radegast. Today, the name Radegast is predominantly used in English, but in several Slavic countries like Poland and Russia, the prevailing notation is Radogost.

The first part of the name contains the adjective rad ("glad"), of uncertain further etymology, and the second part contains the noun gost ("guest"), from Proto-Indo-European *gʰostis (cf. Gothic gasts "guest", Latin: hostis "stranger"), and the name can be translated as "one who is ready to welcome a guest" or "the one who takes good care of guests". The name is ultimately derived from the Proto-Slavic given name *Radogostъ, (Note: Possibly from the earlier form *Ordogostъ; ESSJa reconstructs the Proto-Slavic forms with a soft sign: *Radogostь, *Ordogostь.) cf. Croatian: Radogost, Old Polish Radogost, Radgost, Radogosta, Radosta, Old Slovene Radegost, probably attested as early as the 6th century in a Greek source mentioning a Slavic tribal chief named Ardagast (Ancient Greek: Αρδάγαστος; form before probable metathesis). This name, expanded by the possessive suffix *-jь (*Radogostjь), formed many toponyms throughout Slavdom, cf. Polish villages Radogoszcz, Czech mountain Radhošť, Serbo-Croatian toponym Radogošta, Russian Radogoshch, and Russian hydronyms Radohoshcha and Radogoshch and others, as well as the town of Radogošč, which belonged to the Redarii tribe.

Thietmar, in his Chronicle (written around 1018 r.) states that Svarozhits (recognized as a solar deity) was the most worshiped god in Polabian Radogošč. The same town, however mentioned under the name of Rethra (Latin: Rethre), is also described about 50 years later by Adam of Bremen, who recognizes Redigast as the chief god of this city. As a result, it is generally believed that Radegast is another name for the Polabian Svarozhits, (Note: E.g. according to Strzelczyk, Łowmiański, Loma, Pitro & Vokáč.) or that Radegast is a local sobriquet for Svarozhits. (Note: E.g. according to Gieszytor, Urbańczyk, Szyjewski, Niederle, Rosik, Słupecki.) He is often mentioned as Rad(o)gost-Svarozhits, or Svarozhits/Radogost.

Some scholars, however, recognize that the name of the city was mistakenly assumed to be the chief deity of the city. Nikolay Zubov first points out that primary sources nowhere equate Svarozhits and Radegast. Moreover, the stem -rad appears in almost 150 anthroponyms, which makes this stem one of the most popular elements of names; the stem -gost is also a very popular component, which naturally results in the existence of names like Radegast or Gostirad. He also indicates that the Slavs originally did not give children divine names (as happened in ancient Greece), so the recognition of Radegast as a theonym would require the assumption of an exceptional situation. Aleksander Brückner also claimed that Adam made many mistakes.

=== Other propositions ===
There were also attempts to combine the name Radegast with the name of the Gothic chief Radagaisus, but name Radagaisus has its own Gothic etymology. (Note: "(Having) a light spear" from raþs "light" and *gais "spear".) 18th-century authors, Karl Gottlob Anton and Anton Tomaž Linhart, regarded Radegast as "the god of joy or the generous happy foreigner," but the view of Radegast as an independent deity is considered unlikely. It is also unlikely that Radegast was a pseudo-deity. Some scholars have also suggested that the city was named after a deity, rather than the other way around. According to Gerard Labuda, the Latin Riedegost refers to an area surrounded by forest. He suggests reading the second segment as gozd "forest" and the whole name as "Forest of the Redarians", or also reading the first segment as redny "muddy, marshy" and the whole name as "Marshy, muddy forest".

== In forgeries ==
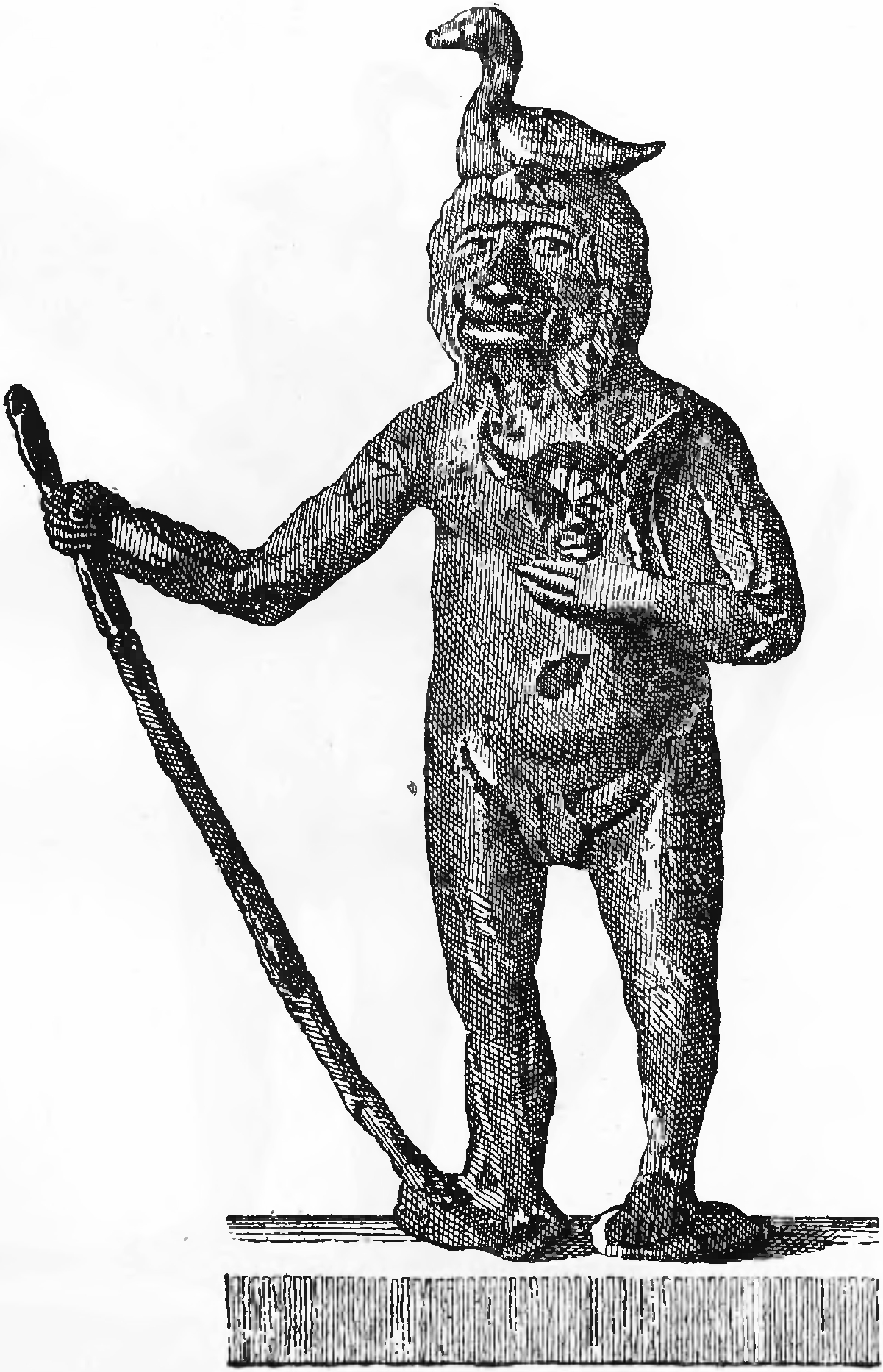
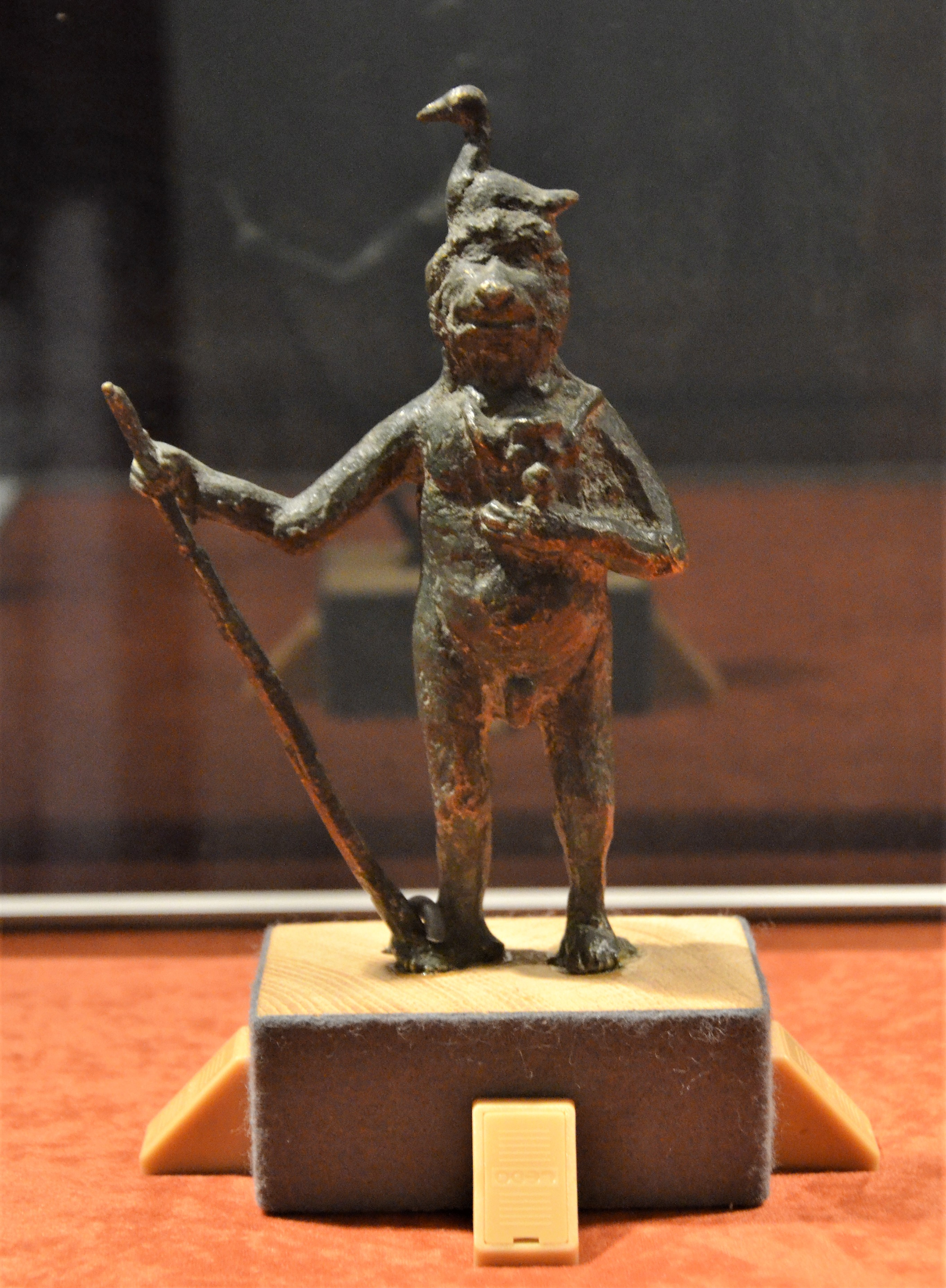
Alleged idol of Radegast

In the second half of the 19th century, so-called Prillwitz idols, which were supposed to depict Slavic deities, became popular. Nowadays, this find is considered an 18th-century forgery. One of the statues is said to represent Radegast, and on the statue the name of the god is written using runes.

Radegast is also found in the glosses falsified by Václav Hanka in the 19th century in the Czech-Latin dictionary Mater Verborum.

== Legend of Radhošť ==
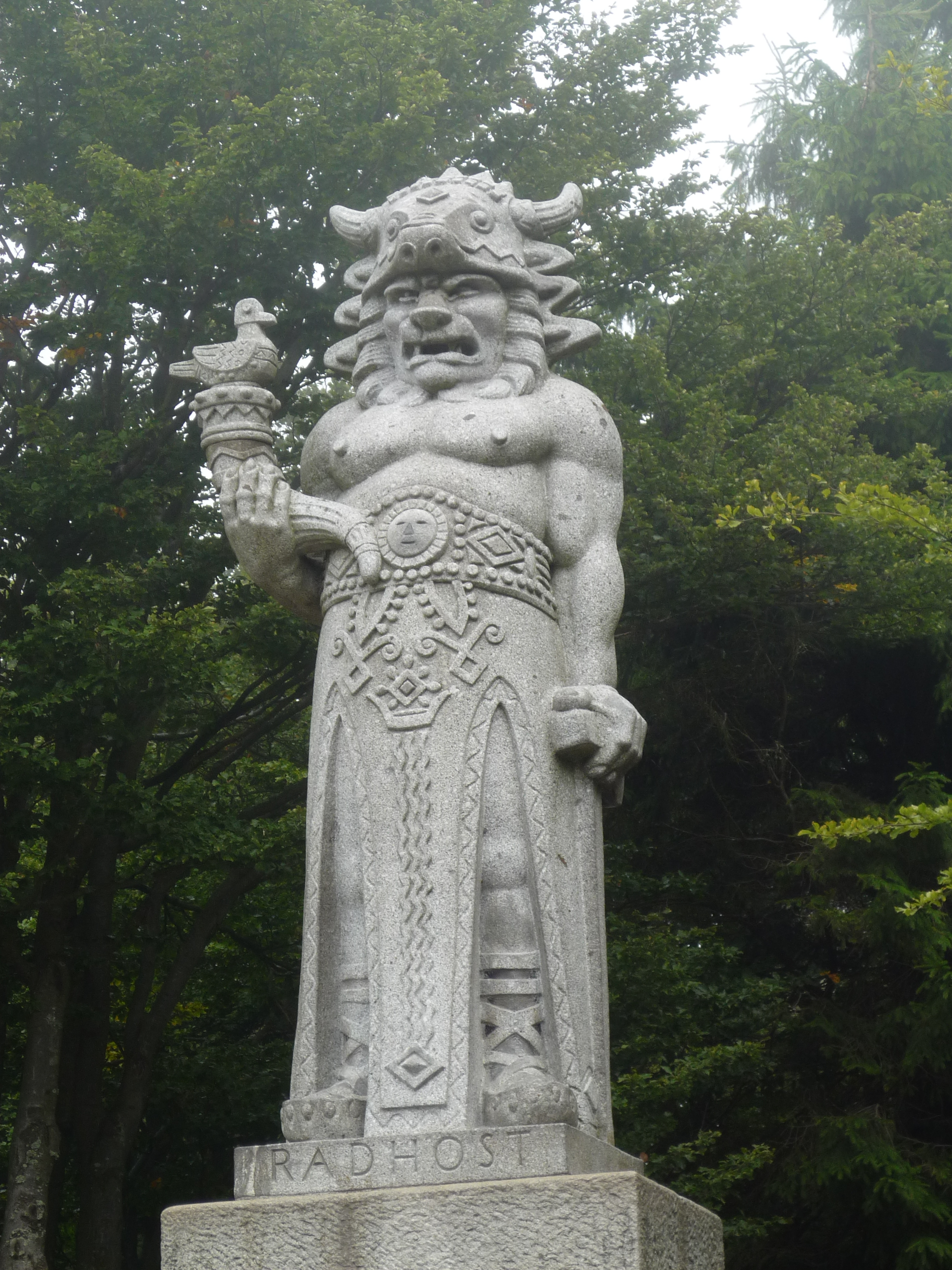
The statue of Radegast on Mount Radhošť by Albin Polasek

In the Czech Republic, there is a local legend associated with Saints Cyril and Methodius, according to which Radegast was worshipped on Radhošť. According to this legend, Cyril and Methodius decided to go on a Christianizing mission to the mountain. They set out to Radhošť from Velehrad through Zašová, where they baptized people. When they were approaching the mountain, they heard sounds of musical instruments and singing from the distance. When they reached the mountain, they saw pagan rituals led by prince Radoch. When the prince heard about the newcomers who were belittling the pagan gods, he began to rebuke Cyril and wanted to use force against him. At this point a glow appeared around the cross held by Cyril, who began to speak of the "one true god" and the pagan gods as "an invention of hell". Then there was a noise and thunder and all the statues of the gods broke into a thousand pieces. Later, on the spot where the magnificent temple and idol of Radegast had stood, the saints erected a cross.

This legend is often found in publications about the mountain and, although the tale has been debunked many times, it often appeared, for example, in folklore. The legend first appears in 1710 in Sacra Moraviae historia sive Vita S. Cyrilli et Methodii by parish priest Jan Jiří Středovský. In the chapter dedicated to the name of the mountain and its origin, he refers to the testimony of a priest, according to whom a legend circulated among the people about a god of the same name, who stood on the top of the mountain and was overthrown by missionaries. On this basis, Středovský created a colourful story about a crowd of worshippers and pagan rituals on the mountain. There is also no archaeological or historiographical evidence that the heavily forested area on the mountain was inhabited in the past.

== In culture ==
- Radagast – wizard in Tolkien's legendarium
- Radegast – Czech beer brand
- Radegast statue – a statue on Radhošť

== Bibliography ==
- Alvarez-Pedroza, Juan Antonio (2021). Sources of Slavic Pre-Christian Religion. Leiden: Koninklijke Brill. ISBN 978-90-04-44138-5.
- Brückner, Aleksander (1985). Mitologia słowiańska. Warsaw: Państwowe Wydawnictwo Naukowe. ISBN 8301062452.
- Enders, Julius (1993). "Speciální problémy Mater verborum". Jazykovědný rozbor Rukopisu Královédvorského, Zelenohorského a dalších staročeských textů s nimi spojovaných (in Czech). Neklan. ISBN 8090088465.
- Gieysztor, Aleksander (2006). Mitologia Słowian (in Polish). Warsaw: Wydawnictwa Uniwersytetu Warszawskiego. ISBN 978-83-235-0234-0.
- Gloger, Zygmunt (1896). "Imiona polsko-słowiańskie". Słownik rzeczy starożytnych (in Polish). Kraków: Gebethner i Wolff.
- Ivanov, Vyacheslav; Toporov, Vladimir (1980). "Славянская мифология". In Tokarev, Sergei (ed.). Мифы народов мира: Энциклопедия (in Russian). Vol. 2. Moscow: Большая российская энциклопедия. pp. 450–456. Archived from the original on 16 July 2014.
- Labuda, Gerard (1979). "Mitologia i demonologia w słownictwie, w bajkach, baśniach i legendach kaszubskich". Materiały Sesji Naukowej. Świat bajek, baśni i legend kaszubskich (in Polish). Wejherowo: Muzeum Piśmiennictwa i Muzyki Kaszubsko-Pomorskiej w Wejherowie. pp. 5–63.
- Loma, Aleksandar (2002). Prakosovo. Slovenski i indoevropski koreni srpske epike (in Serbian). Belgrade.
- Łowmiański, Henryk (1979). Religia Słowian i jej upadek, w. VI-XII. Warsaw: Państwowe Wydawnictwo Naukowe. ISBN 83-01-00033-3.
- Muras, Adam (2016). "Slované a kult Radegasta na Radhošti". Památná hora Radhošť: Její historie, symbolika a odraz v lidové kultuře (PDF) (in Czech). Brno.
- Niederle, Lubor (1924). Slovanské starožitnosti (in Czech). Vol. 1: Oddíl kulturní (2 ed.). Prague.
- Orr, Robert (1994). "Some Slavic Echos in J. R. R. Tolkien's Middle-earth". Germano-Slavica. 8: 23–34.
- Piekosiński, Franciszek (1896). Kamienie mikorzyńskie (in Polish). Kraków.
- Pitro, Martin; Vokáč, Petr (2002). Bohové dávných Slovanů (in Czech). Prague: ISV. ISBN 80-85866-91-9.
- Rosik, Stanisław (2020). The Slavic Religion in the Light of 11th- and 12th-Century German Chronicles (Thietmar of Merseburg, Adam of Bremen, Helmold of Bosau): Studies on the Christian Interpretation of pre-Christian Cults and Beliefs in the Middle Ages. Lejda: Brill. ISBN 9789004331488.
- Rospond, Stanisław (1983). Słowiańskie nazwy miejscowe z sufiksem -jь (in Polish). Wrocław.
- Rzetelska-Feleszko, Ewa (2019). "Etymologia słowiańskich nazw miejscowych i terenowych z obszaru wolińsko-kamieńskiego". Materiały Zachodniopomorskie (in Polish). XV: 27–118. ISSN 0076-5236.
- Słupecki, Leszek Paweł (1994). Slavonic Pagan Sanctuaries. Translated by Szymańska, Izabela. Warsaw: Institute of Archeology and Ethnology of the Polish Academy of Sciences. ISBN 83-85463-27-5.
- Strumiński, Bohdan (1979). "Were the Antes Eastern Slavs?". Harvard Ukrainian Studies. 3/4: 786–796. JSTOR 41035872.
- Strzelczyk, Jerzy (1998). Mity, podania i wierzenia dawnych Słowian (in Polish). Poznań: Dom Wydawniczy Rebis. ISBN 83-7120-688-7.
- Szyjewski, Andrzej (2003). Religia Słowian (in Polish). Kraków: Wydawnictwo WAM. ISBN 83-7318-205-5.
- Šmitek, Zmago (2010). "From the Ancient Slavic Svarožič/Radogost to the Slovene Kresnik". Studia mythologica Slavica (in Slovenian and English). 13: 187–197. doi:10.3986/sms.v13i0.1647.
- Urbańczyk, Stanisław (1991). Dawni Słowianie. Wiara i kult (in Polish). Wrocław: Ossolineum.
- Vasilyev, Valeri (2017). Славянские топонимические древности Новгородской земли (in Russian). Litres. ISBN 9785457529908.
- Zubov, Nikolay (1995). "Научные фантомы славянского Олимпа". Живая старина (in Russian). 3 (7): 46–48. ISSN 0204-3432.

Dictionaries

- Brückner, Aleksander (1927). "rad". Słownik etymologiczny języka polskiego. Krakowska Spółka Wydawnicza. p. 452.
- Boryś, Wiesław (2005). "gość". Słownik etymologiczny języka polskiego. Kraków: Wydawnictwo Literackie. p. 174. ISBN 978-83-08-04191-8.
- Derksen, Rick (2008). "*gȍstь". Etymological Dictionary of the Slavic Inherited Lexicon. Leiden: Brill. pp. 180–181. ISBN 978-90-04-15504-6.
- Trubachyov, Oleg; Zhuravlov, Anatoliy, eds. (2005). "*ord(o)gostь". Etymological Dictionary of Slavic Languages. Vol. 32: (*obžьnъ – *orzbotati). Moscow: Nauka. pp. 147–148.
- Vasmer, Max (1986). "рад". Этимологический словарь русского языка (in Russian). Vol. 3. Translated by Trubachyov, Oleg (2 ed.). Moscow: Progress. p. 429.
