= Zlín Region =

Region of the Czech Republic

Coordinates: 49°13′12″N 17°44′24″E

Zlín Region Zlínský kraj
- Region
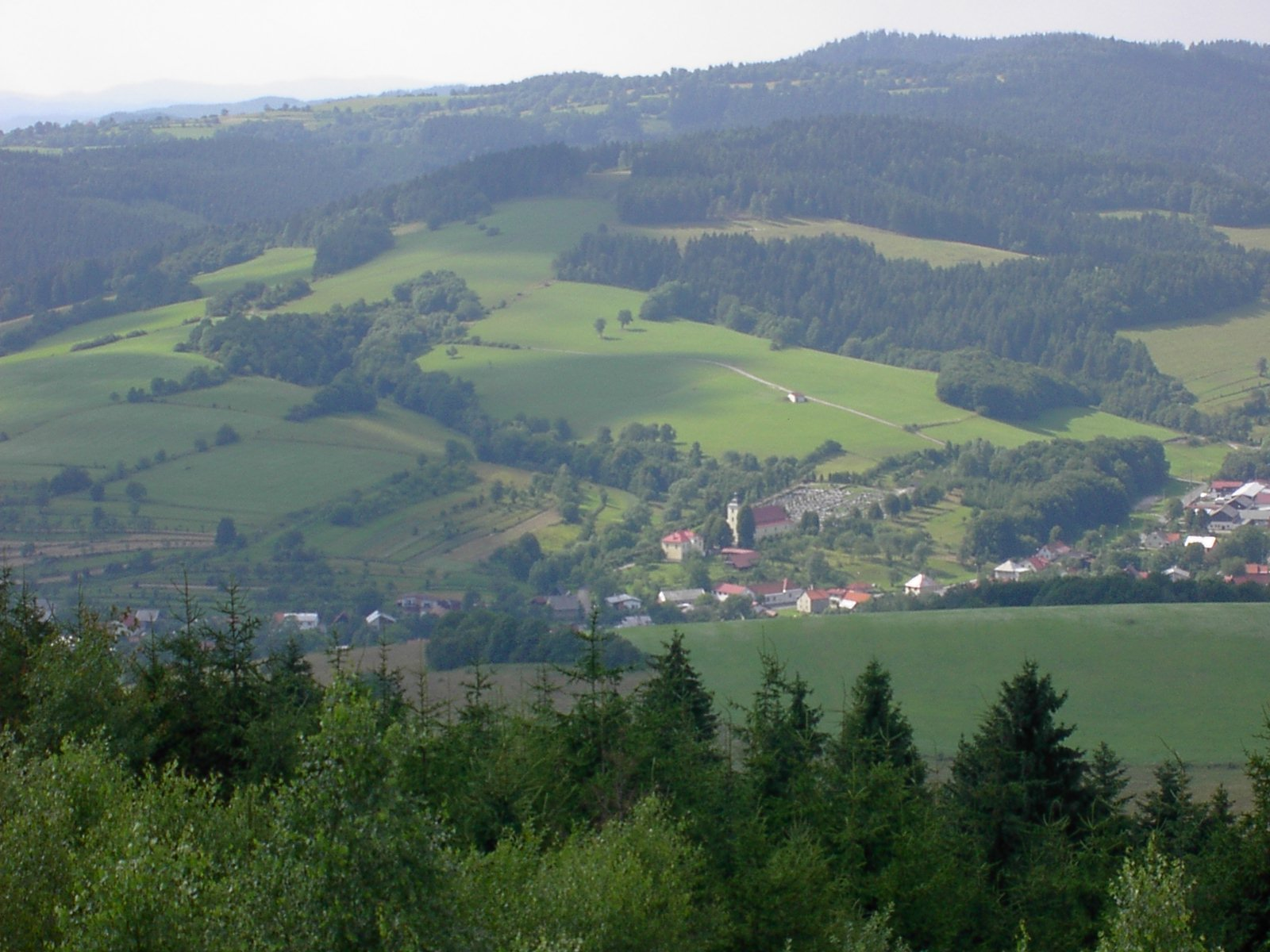

- Flag Coat of arms

- Country: Czech Republic
- Capital: Zlín
- Districts: Kroměříž, Uherské Hradiště, Vsetín, Zlín

Government
  - Governor: Radim Holiš (ANO)

Area
  - Total: 3,963.55 km^{2} (1,530.34 sq mi)
- Highest elevation: 1,206 m (3,957 ft)

Population (2026-01-01)
  - Total: 577,515
  - Density: 145.707/km^{2} (377.378/sq mi)

GDP
  - Total: CZK 281.695 billion (€10.986 billion)
- ISO 3166 code: CZ-72
- Vehicle registration: Z
- Website: www.kr-zlinsky.cz

Zlín Region (Czech: Zlínský kraj) is an administrative unit (Czech: kraj) of the Czech Republic, located in the south-eastern part of the historical region of Moravia. It is named after its capital Zlín. Together with the Olomouc Region, it forms a cohesive area of Central Moravia. It is located in the eastern part of the Czech Republic, where the borders with Slovakia (Trenčín and Žilina Regions) are formed by its eastern edge. It borders the South Moravian Region in the southwest, the Olomouc Region in the northwest, and the Moravian-Silesian Region in the north. Culturally, the region is composed of parts of three traditional Moravian regions: Haná, Moravian Slovakia, and Moravian Wallachia. The city of Zlín lies roughly at their tripoint.

== Administrative divisions ==
The Zlín Region is divided into 4 districts:

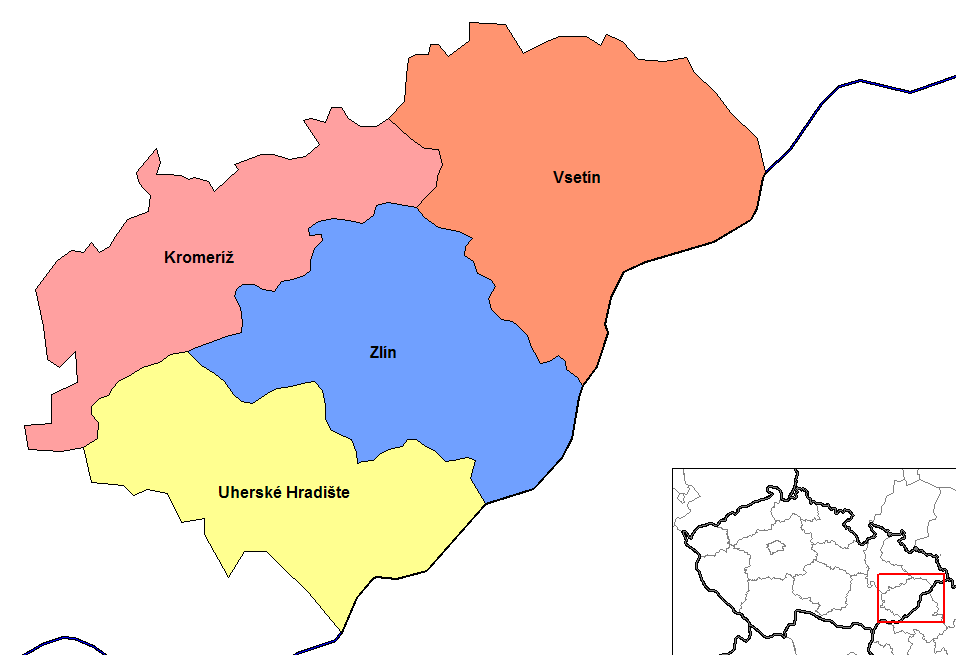
Districts of Zlín Region

| Kroměříž; Uherské Hradiště | Vsetín; Zlín |

The Zlín Region was established on 1 January 2000 on the basis of the constitutional act No. 347 from 3 December 1997 on foundation of higher self-governing units. It was formed by the merger of parts of Jihomoravský kraj (the Zlín District, the Kroměříž District and the Uherské Hradiště District), and the Severomoravský kraj (the Vsetín District). The region has in total 307 municipalities, of which 30 are towns. There are 13 municipalities with extended powers and 25 territorial districts of municipalities with authorized municipal office. According to government statistics, the Zlín Region is the safest region in the Czech Republic; it has the lowest number of assaults, rapes, suicides and road accidents in the country.

== Geography ==
With its area of 3,964 km^{2}, Zlín Region is the fourth smallest region of the Czech Republic. The character of the region's territory is very diverse. While parts of the region are hilly, flat fertile areas of Haná and Slovácko stretch in the Kroměříž District and the Uherské Hradiště District. The Moravian-Silesian Beskids with its highest peak Čertův mlýn mountain (1,206 m) is situated in the northern part of the region and the Maple Mountains mountain range with its highest peak of Velký Javorník (1,071 m) is located in the east. Towards the south, forming the border with Slovakia, there is the White Carpathians mountain range (in Czech: Bílé Karpaty) with its highest mountain of Velká Javořina (970 m). The Hostýn-Vsetín Mountains and Vizovice Highlands pass south of the Moravian-Silesian Beskids mountain range. On the south-western part of the region, there are the Chřiby highlands with the highest point Brdo (587 m). The Upper Morava Valley passes through from the west among the highlands of Chřiby highlands and above mentioned hilly countries through the Kroměříž District up to the Zlín District. The Lower Morava Valley passes through along the Morava River in the Uherské Hradiště District to South Moravian Region.

Most of the streams in the area flow to Morava River. The most important ones are the Bečva River in the northern part and the Olšava River in the southern part. The Morava River is the biggest river of the Region flowing through both the vales from west to the south.

The region's climate is rather favourable. The average temperature of air was 9.8 °C in 2012 and the total amount of precipitation was 598.6 mm/m2.

Most of the soils in the region are poor in minerals (with the exception of potassium and magnesium) and humus. These are the brown earth of the highlands and the podzolic soils that locally pass to brown earth of the lower locations towards the south. In the vales, there are very fertile brown earth and chernozem. High-quality floodplain soils surround the Morava River. It is rather difficult to cultivate soil in a large part of the Region due to the steep land and variety of the terrain.

== History ==
Regional representatives voted in 2001 on a proposed name change to the region. The alternative Východomoravský kraj (East Moravian Region) was proposed, however a majority of voters elected to retain the region's existing name.

== Population ==
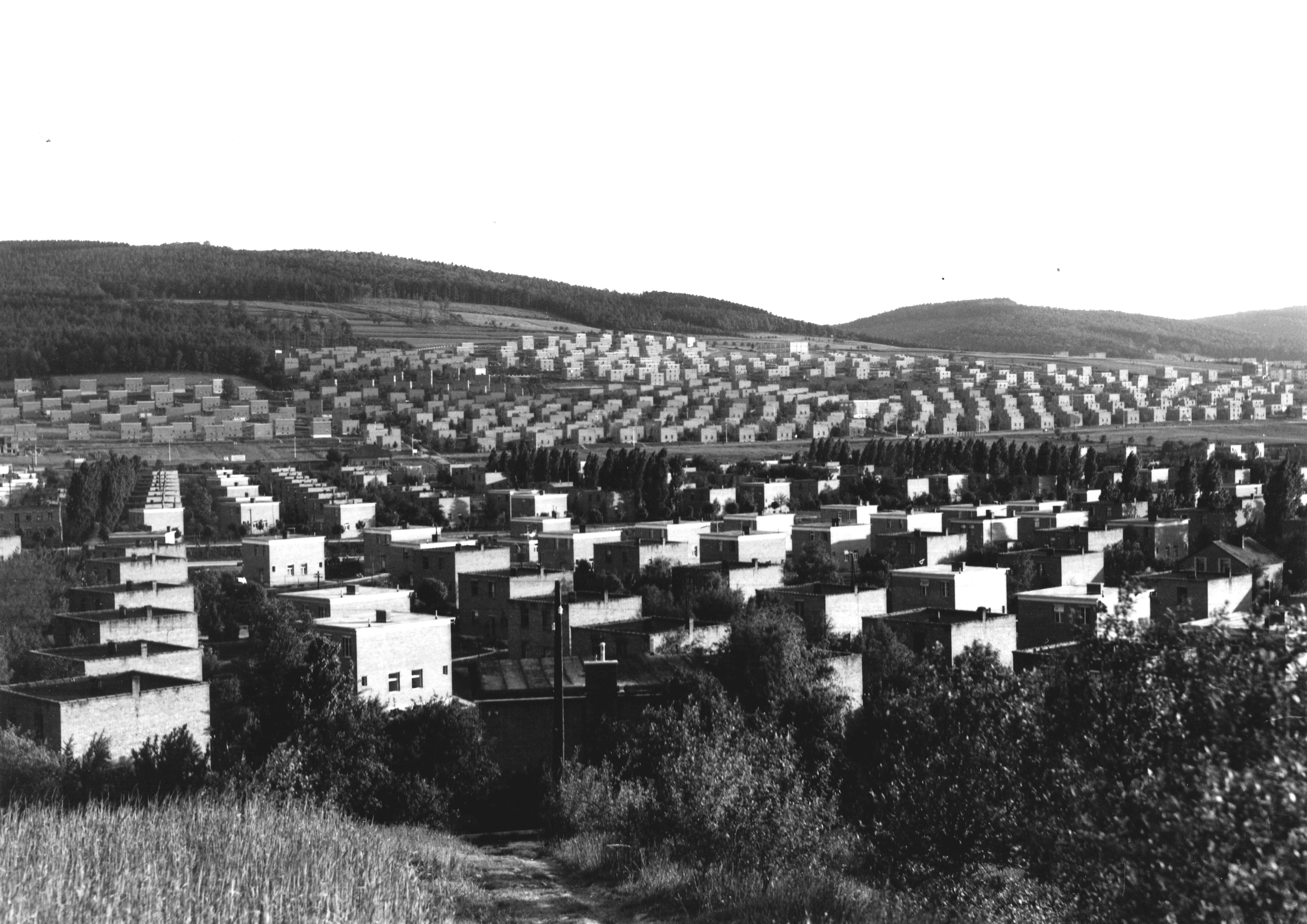
Corporate Town of Zlín

As of 1 January 2024, the region has 580,744 inhabitants. The share of males on the total population was 49.0%. Average age was 43.1 years, along with Hradec Králové Region the highest in the Czech Republic. The density of population of 147 inhabitants per km^{2} exceeds the national average. The highest density of population occurs in the Zlín District (184 inhabitants per km^{2}) and the lowest in the Vsetín District (125 inhabitants per km^{2}). The table shows cities and towns in the region with the largest population (as of January 1, 2024):

| Name | Population | Area (km^{2}) | District |
|---|---|---|---|
| Zlín | 74,255 | 103 | Zlín District |
| Kroměříž | 28,089 | 51 | Kroměříž District |
| Vsetín | 25,255 | 58 | Vsetín District |
| Uherské Hradiště | 24,933 | 21 | Uherské Hradiště District |
| Valašské Meziříčí | 22,833 | 35 | Vsetín District |
| Otrokovice | 17,597 | 20 | Zlín District |
| Uherský Brod | 16,444 | 52 | Uherské Hradiště District |
| Rožnov pod Radhoštěm | 16,151 | 39 | Vsetín District |
| Holešov | 11,556 | 34 | Kroměříž District |
| Bystřice pod Hostýnem | 8,023 | 27 | Kroměříž District |

Other significant towns in Zlín Region are Napajedla, Hulín, Staré Město and Slavičín.

Historical population

| Year | Pop. | ±% |
|---|---|---|
| 1869 | 314,475 | — |
| 1880 | 341,037 | +8.4% |
| 1890 | 356,263 | +4.5% |
| 1900 | 378,480 | +6.2% |
| 1910 | 403,012 | +6.5% |

| Year | Pop. | ±% |
|---|---|---|
| 1921 | 404,985 | +0.5% |
| 1930 | 436,544 | +7.8% |
| 1950 | 478,466 | +9.6% |
| 1961 | 532,676 | +11.3% |
| 1970 | 550,465 | +3.3% |

| Year | Pop. | ±% |
|---|---|---|
| 1980 | 591,334 | +7.4% |
| 1991 | 596,903 | +0.9% |
| 2001 | 595,010 | −0.3% |
| 2011 | 579,944 | −2.5% |
| 2021 | 564,331 | −2.7% |

Source: Censuses

== Economy ==
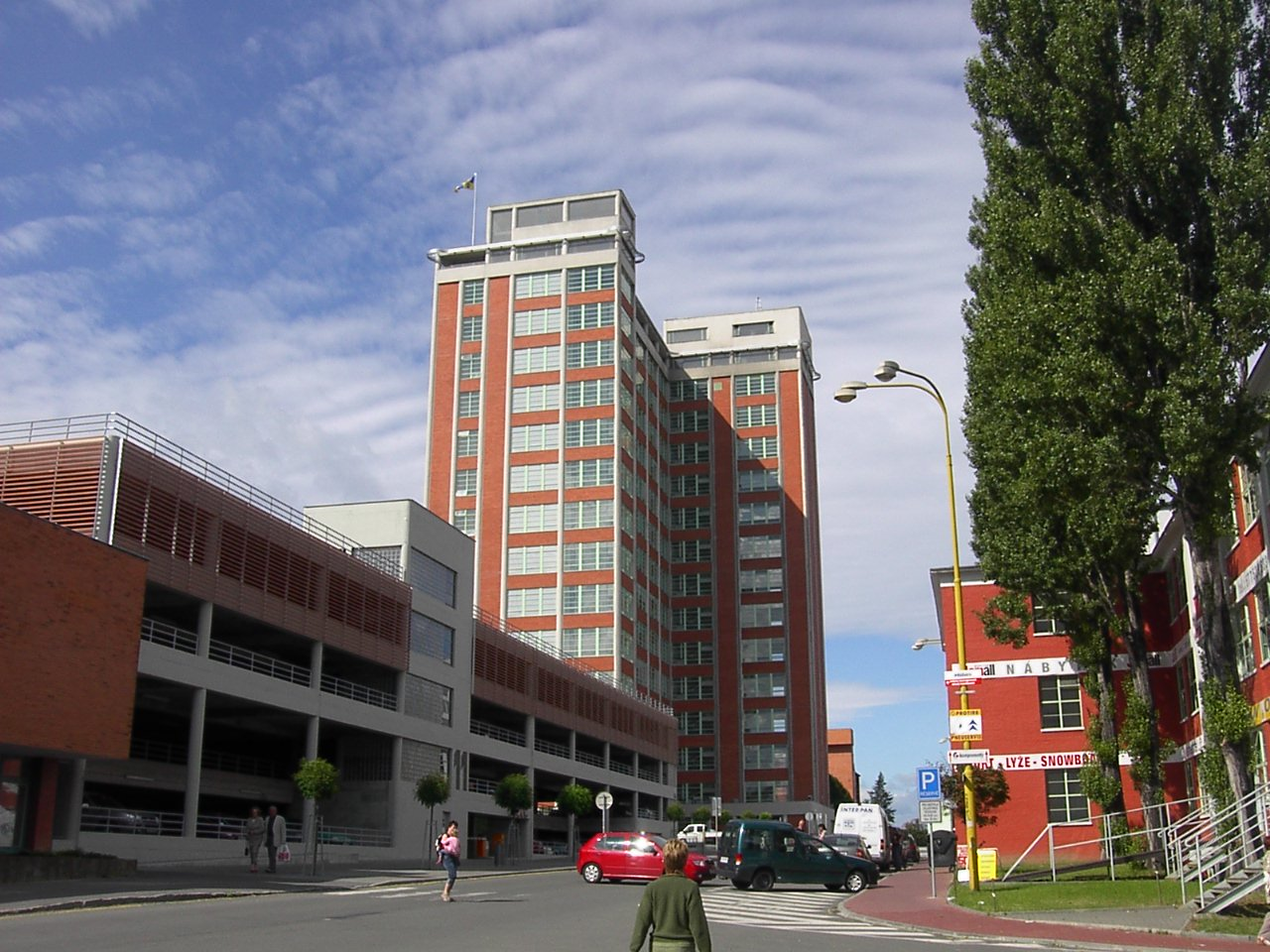
Skyscraper "21" in Zlín

In 2021, the total GDP reached 11,737 million EUR. The region's GDP per capita was EUR 20,193 (85% of the national average), ranking sixth among fourteen regions of the Czech Republic. Industrial potential of the region lies in manufacturing enterprises that represent 16% of total registered entities. As of end 2012, the Zlín Region had 138,269 legal and physical entities out of which 14,379 had employees. 1,382 enterprises had 25 or more employees. The registered unemployment rate was 2.6% in 8/2022. Within the region, the highest unemployment rate was reported from the Vsetín District (3,2%), while the lowest from the Zlín District (2.4%).

=== Transport ===
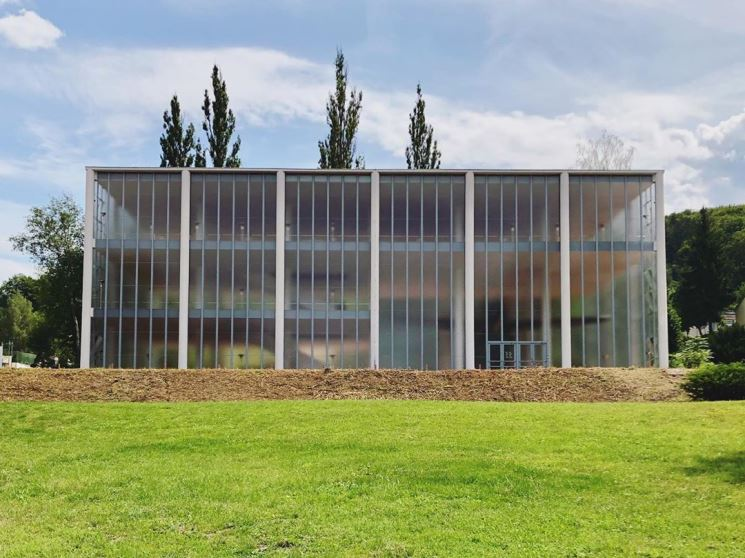
Tomas Bata Memorial

A total of 17 km (11 mi) of motorway is present in the region. The length of operated railway lines in the region is 359 km (223 mi).

=== Education and healthcare ===
There are two universities in the region: Tomas Bata University in Zlín and European polytechnical institute in Kunovice. The former has a public status, 6 faculties and can confer a bachelor's and master's degrees. The latter one is a private college. The network of pre-school and school establishments consists of 310 nursery schools, 257 basic schools, 17 grammar schools, 71 secondary schools, 11 higher professional schools. On average, a general practitioner takes care of 258 inhabitants in average. Acute, successive and rehabilitation health care is ensured by a network of 10 hospitals with 2,849 available beds.

=== Tourism ===
The Zlín Region has a number of natural, cultural and historic landmarks, including mountains, garden architecture, spas, wine valleys, remains of the Great Moravian Empire, religious monuments, historic buildings, and examples of the functional architecture associated with the Bata company.

=== Agriculture ===
48.9% of soil in the region is agricultural soil and 51.1% is non-agricultural. Most agricultural soil belongs to the Uherské Hradiště District (57 277 Hectares, of which 70.1% is arable land). There is a completely different division of soil in the Vsetín District where the percentage of non-agricultural soil is much higher (64.6%) and 83.8% of it is covered with forests, mostly spruce forests.

== Places of interest ==
- Spa Luhačovice – Tens of thousands of visitors arrive every year to the biggest Moravian spa in order to relax and gain health. The spa has a long tradition of spa treatments of the respiratory system, digestive system, diabetes and locomotive organs. Very famous are the curative springs, favourable climatic conditions and also the typical architecture.
- Down-hill and cross country skiing is possible in Pustevny, Portáš, Velké Karlovice, the Chřiby highlands and Hostýn-Vsetín Highlands.
- Along the Morava River there is the Moravian cycle route, which is connected to the Austrian and Slovak cycle routes.
- Mountain climbers can practice in The Pulčín rocks, Lačnov rocks or Čertovy rocks.
- An original experience is the voyage on the Baťa canal (in Czech: Baťův kanál).
- Water reservoirs Horní Bečva, Bystříčka, Ostrožovská Nová Ves, Rusava, Pozlovice and Smraďavka.
- A worldwide appreciation is given to the Podzámecká and Květná gardens and archiepiscopal castle in Kroměříž, which are entered in the UNESCO List of World Cultural Heritage.
- Holešov with its museum of Jewish culture
- The gothic castle Buchlov, the baroque castle in Buchlovice and Velehrad pilgrimage place
- The monument of Great Moravia in Staré Město
- The Valašské museum in nature and open-air museum in Rožnov pod Radhoštěm
- Area of buildings in Pustevny, the statute of pagan god Radegast and sculptural group of Cyril and Methodius in Radhošť
- The zoological garden with a castle in Lešná
- The Museum of footwear in Zlín.
- The events that document the ethnographic richness of the region are the Carnival in Strání, Ride of kings in Vlčnov or the Kopaničářský festival in Starý Hrozenkov. Every year the Summer film school takes place in Uherské Hradiště and the International film festival for children and the young in Zlín.

== Gallery ==
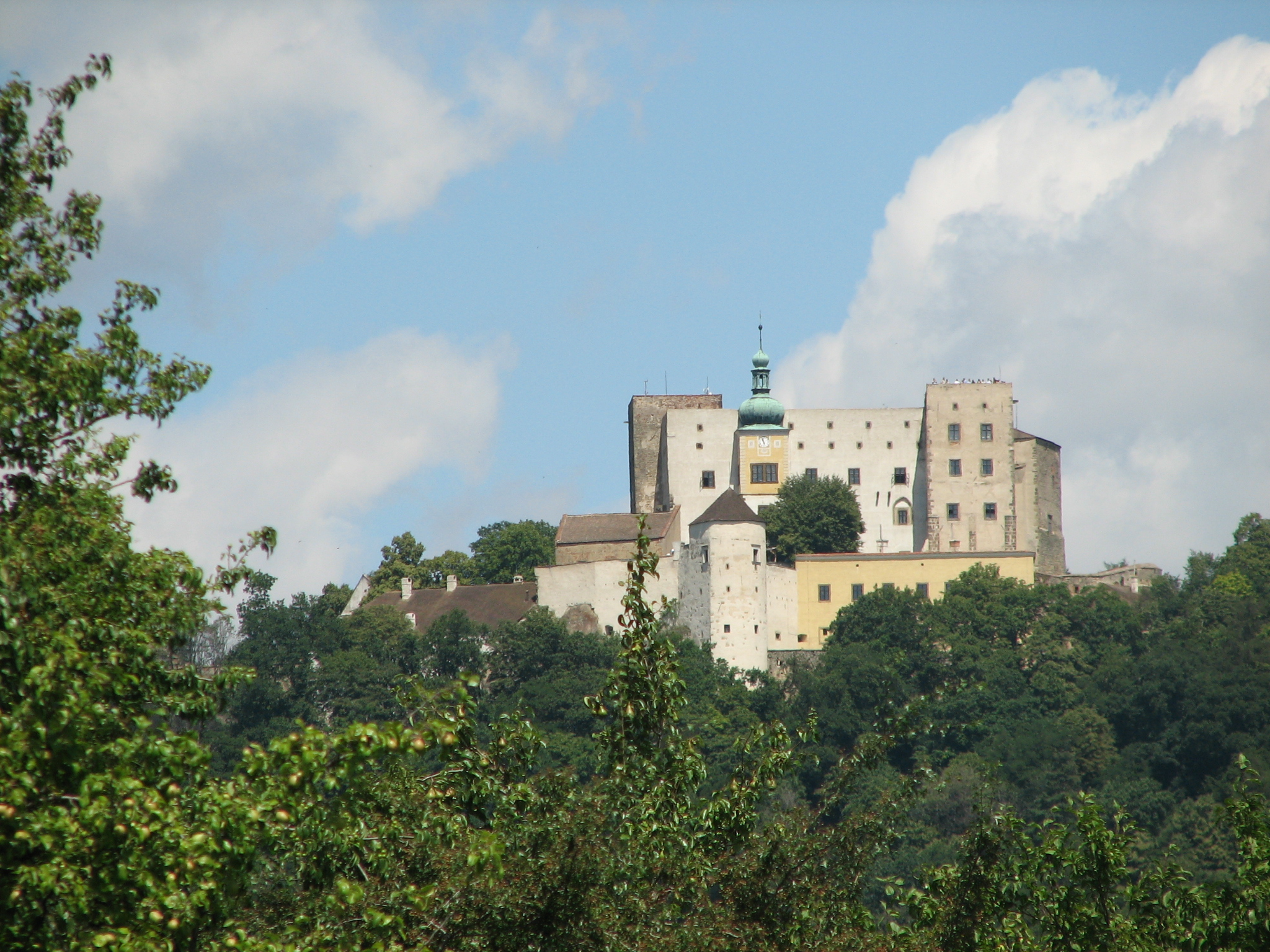
The Buchlov castle

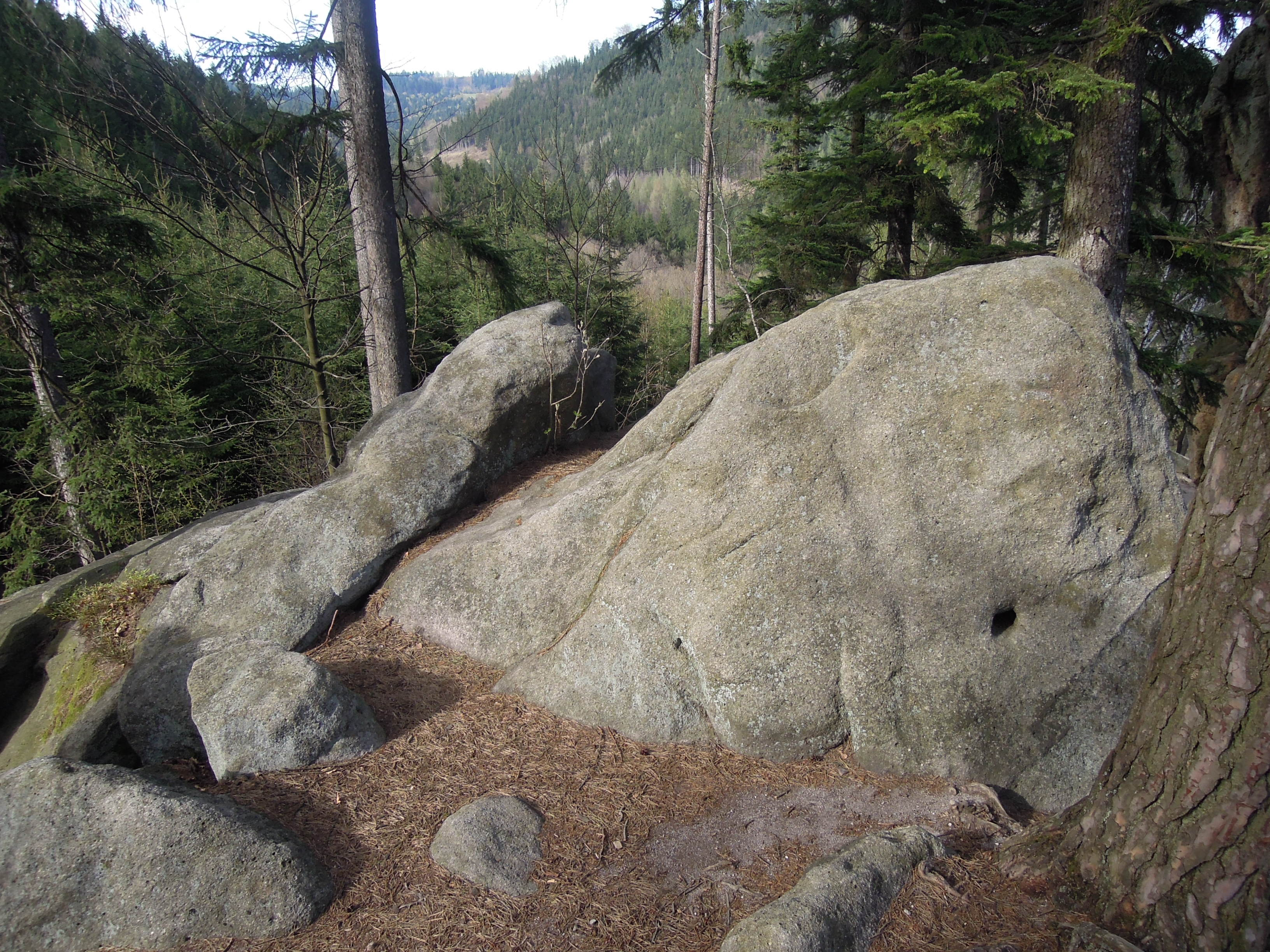
Čertovy skály in Lidečko

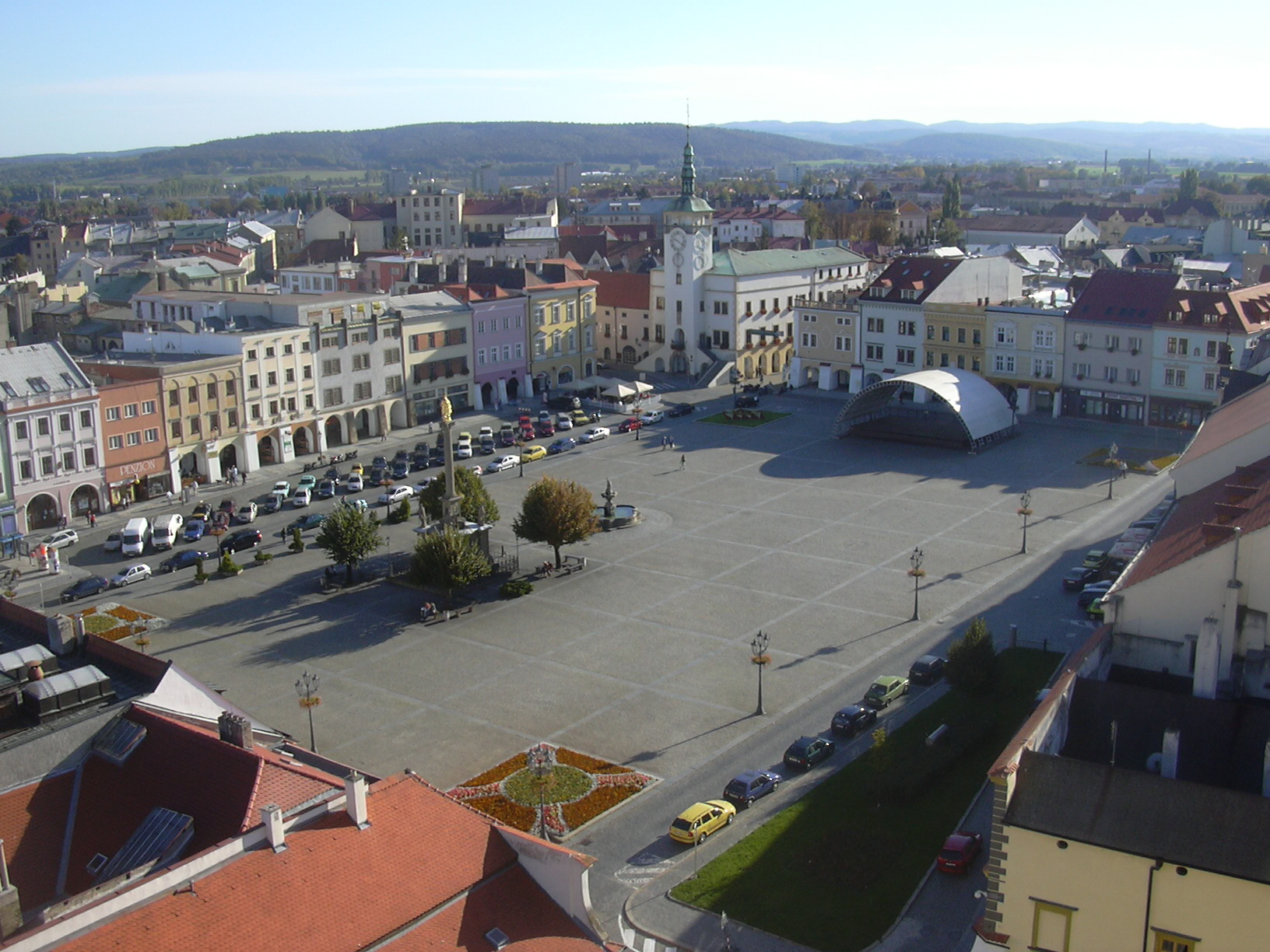
Town square in Kroměříž

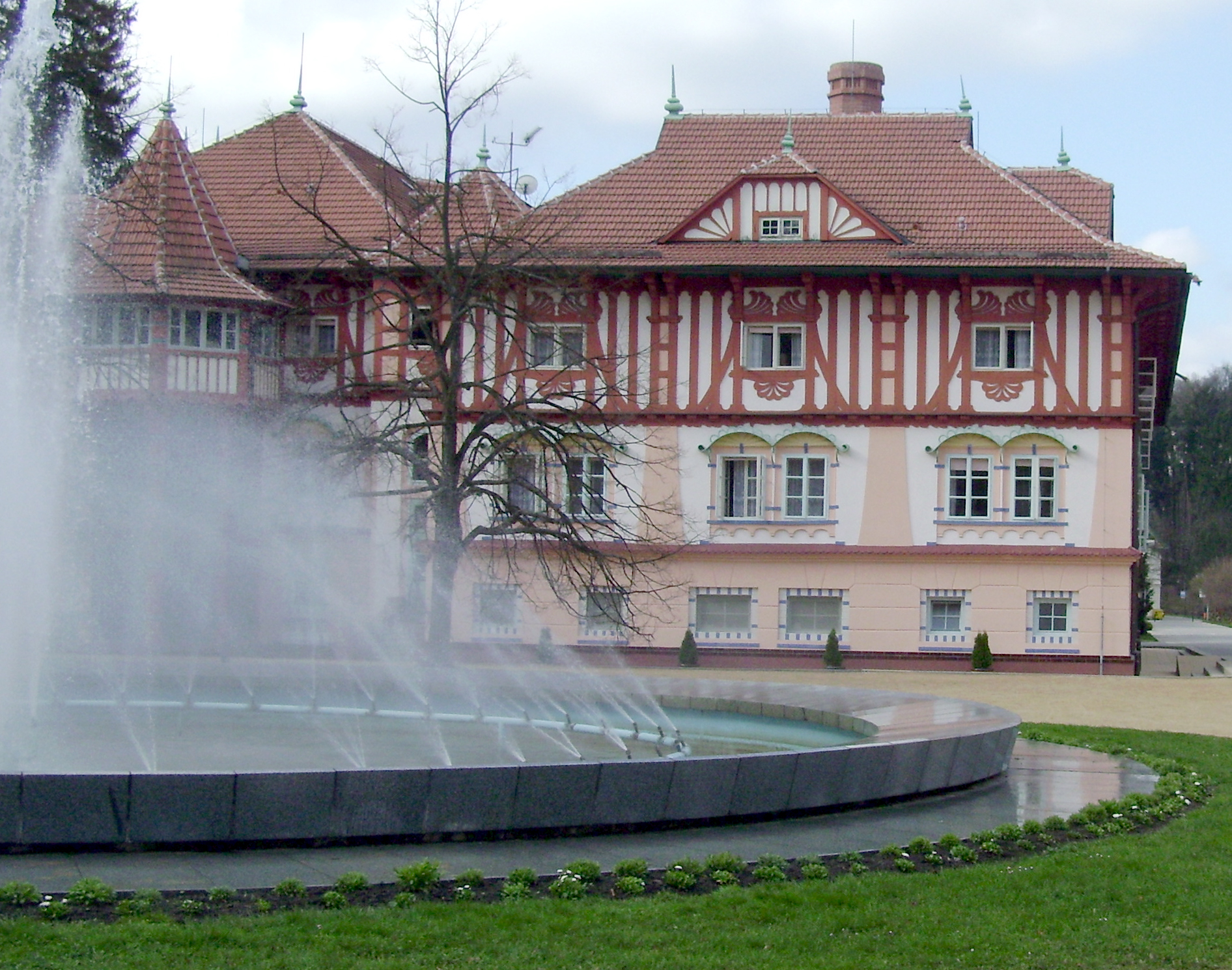
Jurkovič House in Luhačovice

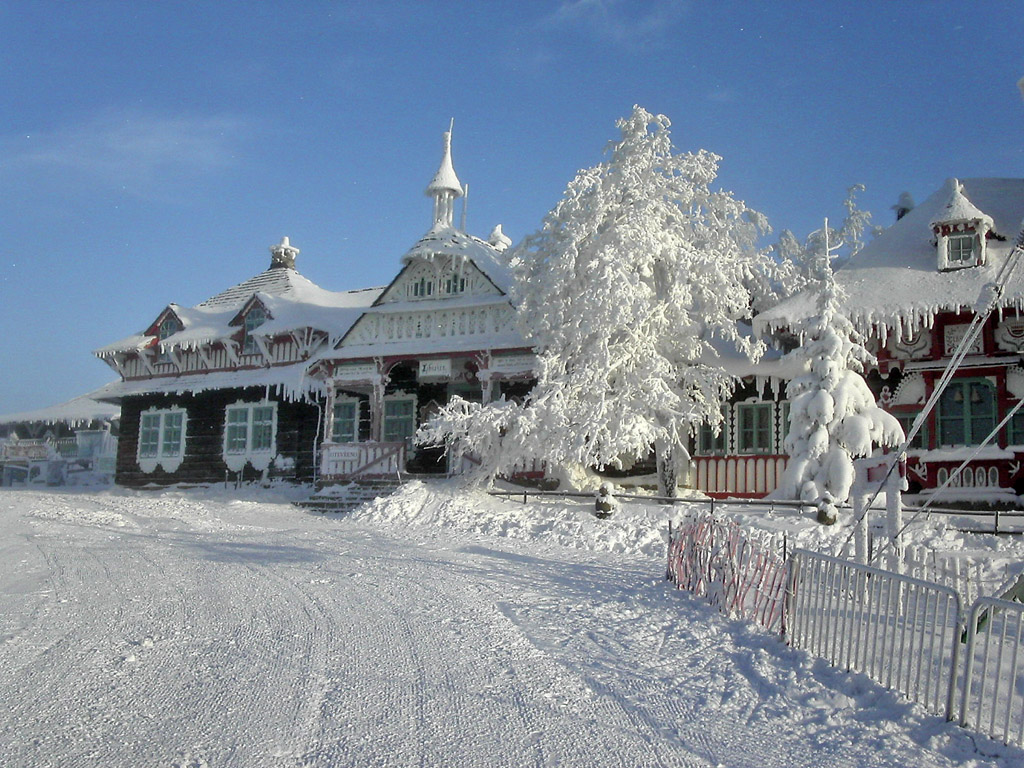
Libušín chalet in Pustevny

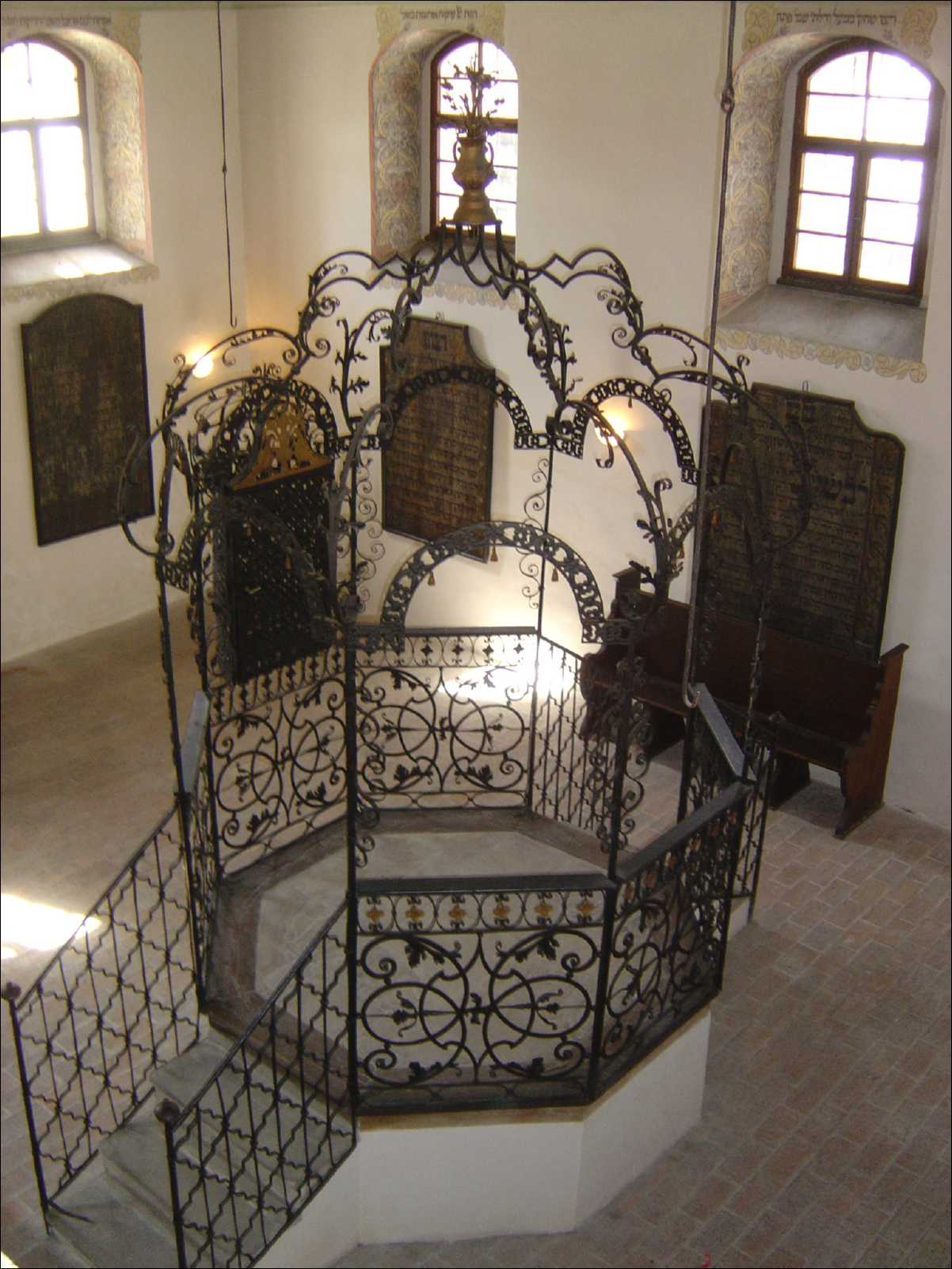
Shah Synagogue in Holešov

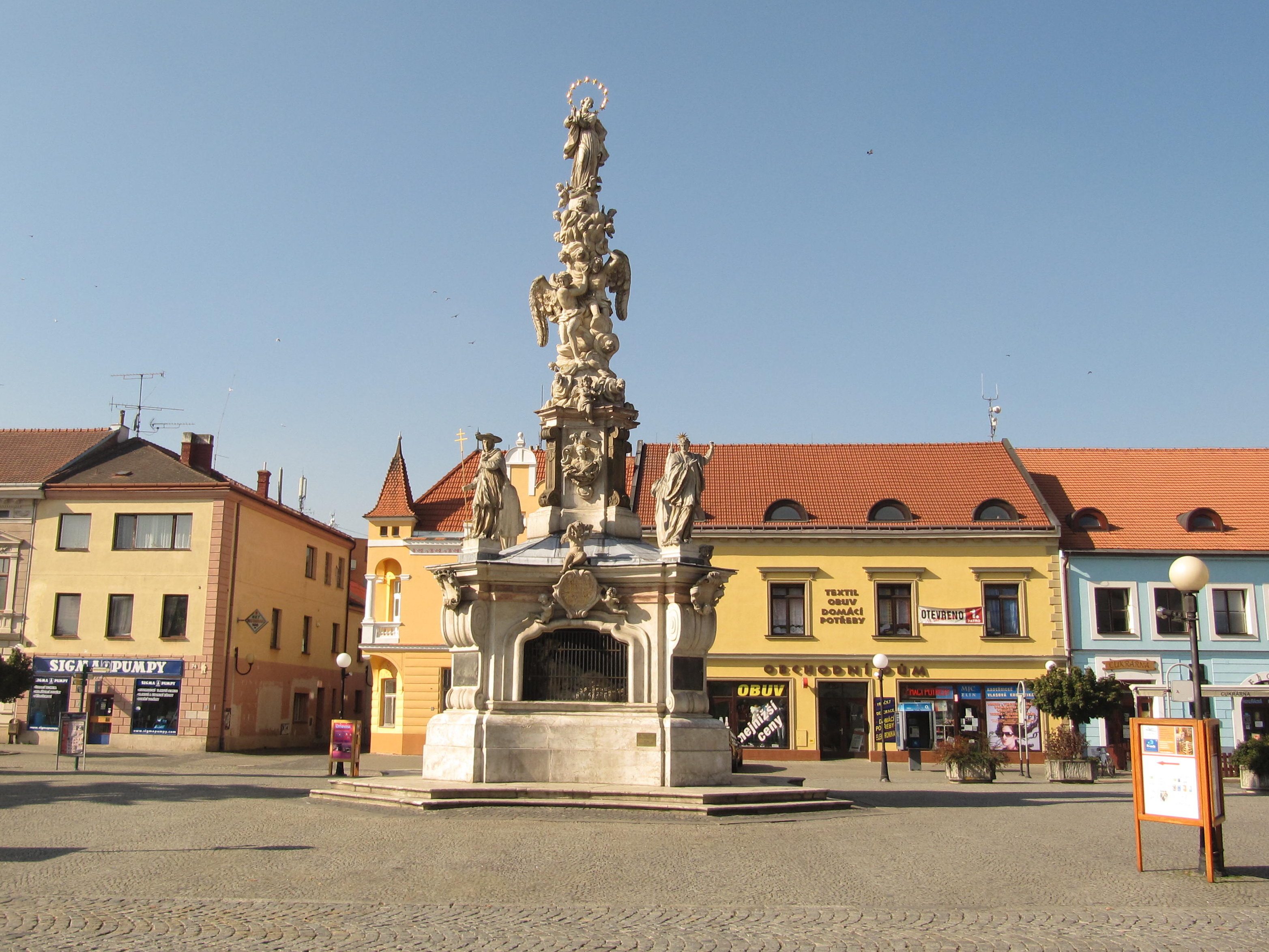
Marian column in Uherské Hradiště

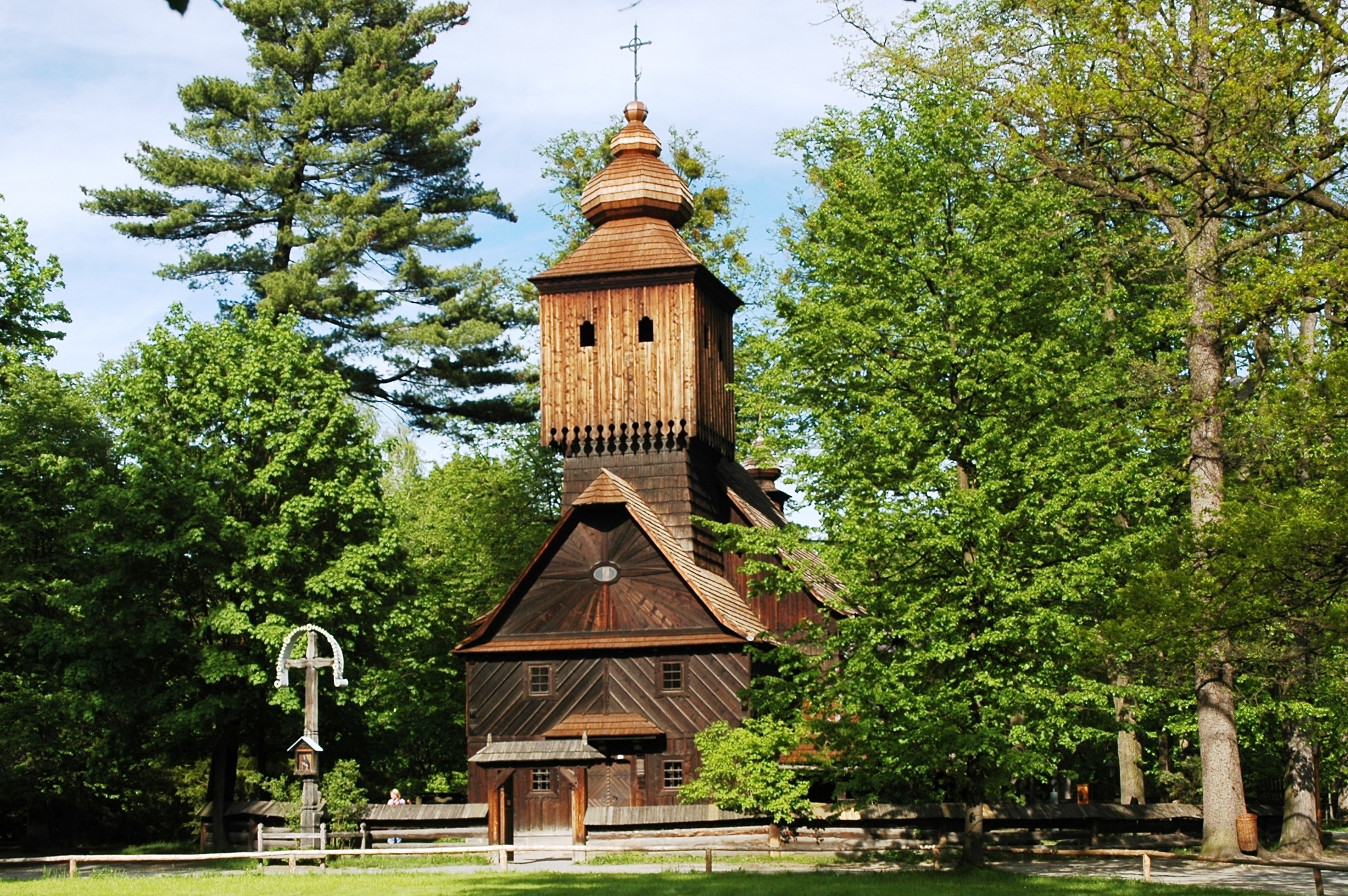
Wallachian Open Air Museum in Rožnov pod Radhoštěm

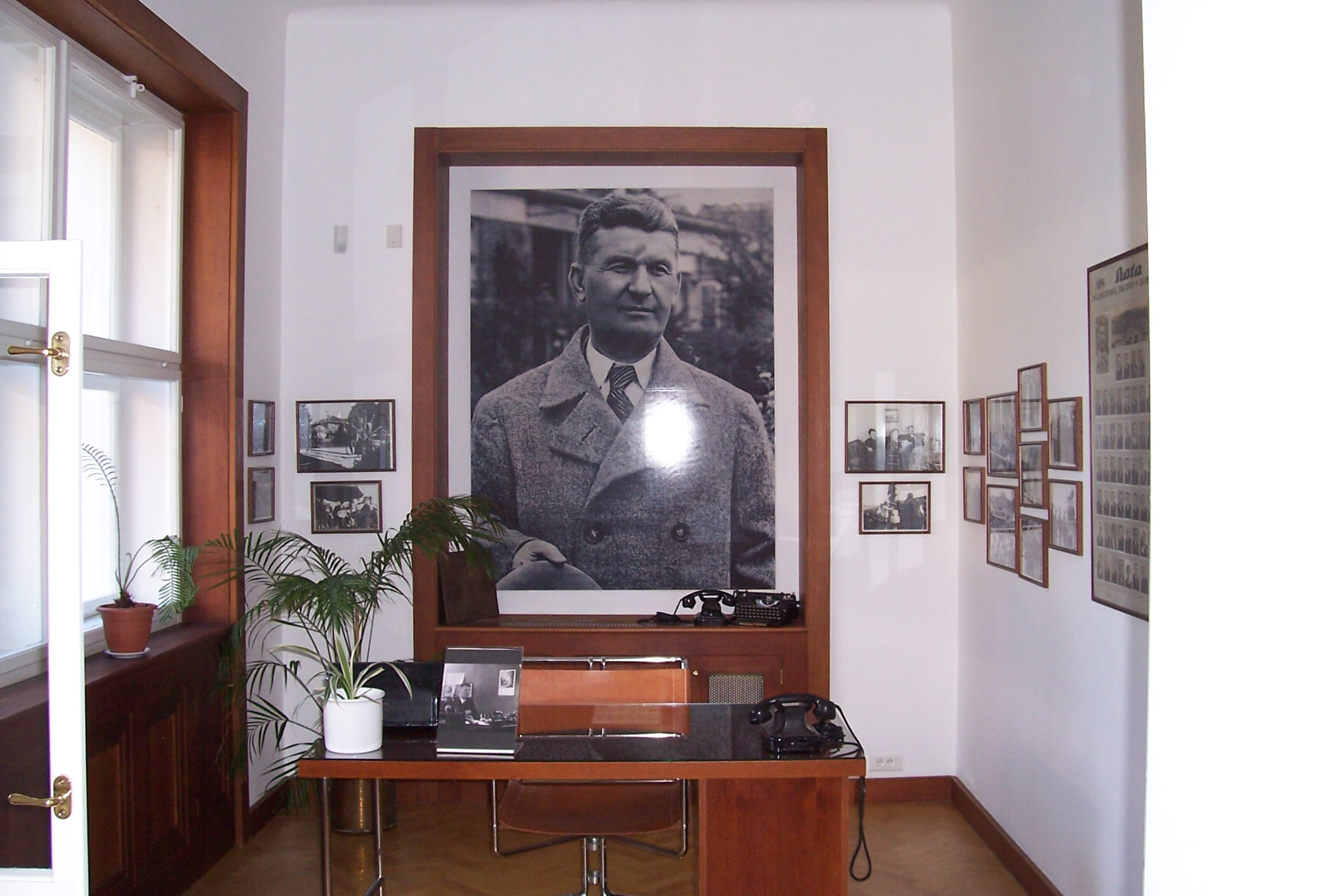
The office of Tomáš Baťa in Zlín
