= Thomas Garrigue Masaryk Monument =

Memorial in Chicago, Illinois, U.S.

- The monument in 2026
- Artist: Albin Polasek
- Location: Chicago, Illinois, U.S.; 41°47′13″N 87°35′24.5″W

The Thomas Garrigue Masaryk Monument (also known as the Thomas Garrigue Masaryk Memorial) is a monument by Albin Polasek, installed in Midway Plaisance in Chicago, Illinois, United States. It was created in 1949 and installed in 1955. The memorial depicts a Blanik knight on horseback.

== See also ==
- List of equestrian statues in the United States
