= Radegast (statue) =

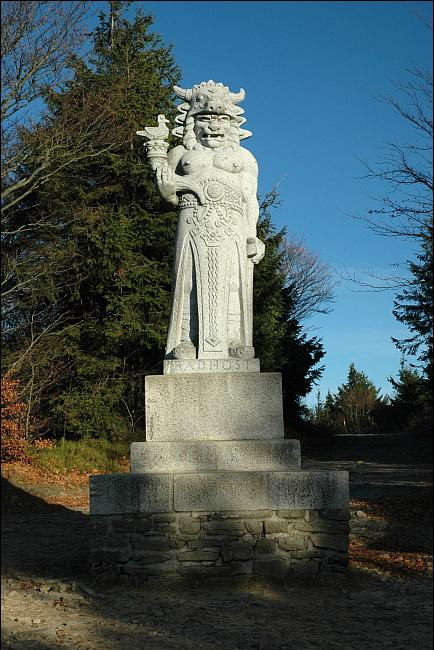
- Replica of the statue on Mount Radhošť
- Interactive map of Radegast
- Location: Radhošť, Dolní Bečva, Czech Republic
- Coordinates: 49°28′57″N 18°15′11″E
- Designer: Albin Polasek
- Material: granite
- Height: 3.20 metres (10.5 ft)
- Weight: 3.38 t
- Beginning date: 1924
- Completion date: c. 1930
- Inauguration date: 5 July 1931
- Dedicated to: Radegast

The statue of Radegast (Czech: socha Radegasta) is a statue of the alleged Slavic god Radegast located on Mount Radhošť in Dolní Bečva, Czech Republic, facing the summit. The statue was created by academic sculptor Albin Polasek, a professor at the Art Institute of Chicago from Frenštát pod Radhoštěm. The original statue is currently located in the town hall in Frenštát, and on Radhošť there is a replica of it, which is 3.2 metres (10 ft) high and weighs 3.38 tonnes. The second original statue, made at the same time, is located in the Prague Zoo.

== Description ==
The statue of the god has the body of a man, his head is in the form of a lion with a grimace as if of a beast, on his head is a helmet in the form of a bull's head with horns, he is dressed in a skirt decorated with ornaments, with a wide ornamented belt with a buckle in the shape of the sun, from under the skirt protrude human feet dressed in a krpce. In his right hand he is holding a horn of plenty on which a duck is sitting, with his left hand he is leaning against an axe on a long pole, possibly a shepherd's axe.

== Creation of the sculpture ==
Albin Polasek began work on his piece as early as 1924, and it is known that several versions of the work were created in the United States. Polasek's original intention was to create a set of sculptures of gods from Slavic mythology, for the location of which he chose the mythical mountain Radhošť. In 1930, the author rented Novák's studio in Prague and created the final form of the statue of Radegast. Before World War II, Polasek often went on vacation to his hometown Frenštát pod Radhoštěm. Under his personal supervision and guidance, two identical sculptures of Radegast (according to the third model) were made in Mašek's foundry in Prague around 1930.

Both statues were made of a mixture of concrete and granite rubble reinforced with an iron skeleton, but they differed in color. The first statue of Radegast, made of white and black granite, was dedicated by Polasek to the inhabitants of his hometown and placed on the Radhošť Mountain. Polasek intended to place the second statue of Radegast, made of red granite, in his garden because he wanted to return to Beskydy Mountains in his old age and use this statue to complete the set of statues of Slavic gods he was building in his garden. World War II and later the 1948 coup derailed Polasek's plans for old age. In addition, changing political relations in Czechoslovakia, as well as serious health problems (a stroke in 1950) discouraged him from returning to his homeland forever.

The ceremonial unveiling of the statue of Radegast and the statue of Cyril and Methodius, which was created at the same time, took place on 5 July 1931, the Slavic Missionaries Cyril and Methodius Day, as part of a Slavic pilgrimage organized by the associations Matice Radhošťská and Pohorská jednota "Radhošť" under the patronage of the Czechoslovak government with the support of President Tomáš Masaryk. The creation of the monument was paid for by the Czech diaspora in the United States, who then donated it to their homeland.

In the late 1950s or early 1960s, Polasek's second sculpture of Radegast was discovered by workers in the garden of the former Mašek's foundry in Prague under a layer of earth and leaves. It was probably hidden from the German occupiers at the beginning or during World War II, and the well-disguised statue was forgotten after 1945. Since the statue had animal features, the local authorities thought it thematically fit into the Prague Zoo, where it was moved in 1961. In 2014–2015, the statue was restored and completed with a duck on a horn of plenty, which had been lost over the years.

== Restoration and replica of the statue on Radhošť ==
The Radegast statue has become an integral part of the Radhošť massif. Since 1958, it has been on the list of cultural monuments protected by the state. Over the decades, however, the artificial stone has suffered from harsh weather conditions, and the iron reinforcement used to strengthen the statue also attracted lightning, which damaged it as early as 1938. The greatest damage was caused by the freezing of water in the cracks, which resulted in the spalling of the concrete and the corrosion of the iron skeleton. At an unknown time, a damaged terracotta duck was removed from the statue and later deposited in the museum in Frenštát pod Radhoštěm.

The monument was first restored in 1980. This task was undertaken by sculptor Karel Hořínek and his son, who repaired the cracks, poured and reinforced the interior with concrete, and made a replica of the missing duck based on photographs. Radegast returned to its place on June 11, 1982.

In 1994, it was noticed that the erosion of the statue was progressing rapidly, so the staff of the historic preservation decided to move it to a safe place and create a replica of the statue from more durable natural material. In May 1996 the original was transported from Radhošť to Leskovec to the workshop of Jan Sobek and Miroslav Zubíček who, under the direction of academic sculptor Miroslav Machala, made the replica from granite from the quarry in Vápenice near Vysoký Chlumec in the Sedlčansko region, which is the closest in color to the original. The financial costs of making the replica, which amounted to almost 1 million CZK, were covered by the brewery in Nošovice, which has the statue of Radegast in its logo. Within a few months, stonemasons carved the copy from an 18-tonne granite block, which was placed in its original location on the ridge of Radhošť – about 2.5 km east of the peak – on 4 July 1998.

After complicated negotiations, the restored original monument was placed in the vestibule of Frenštát pod Radhoštěm Town Hall and unveiled on 6 November 1998.

== Gallery ==
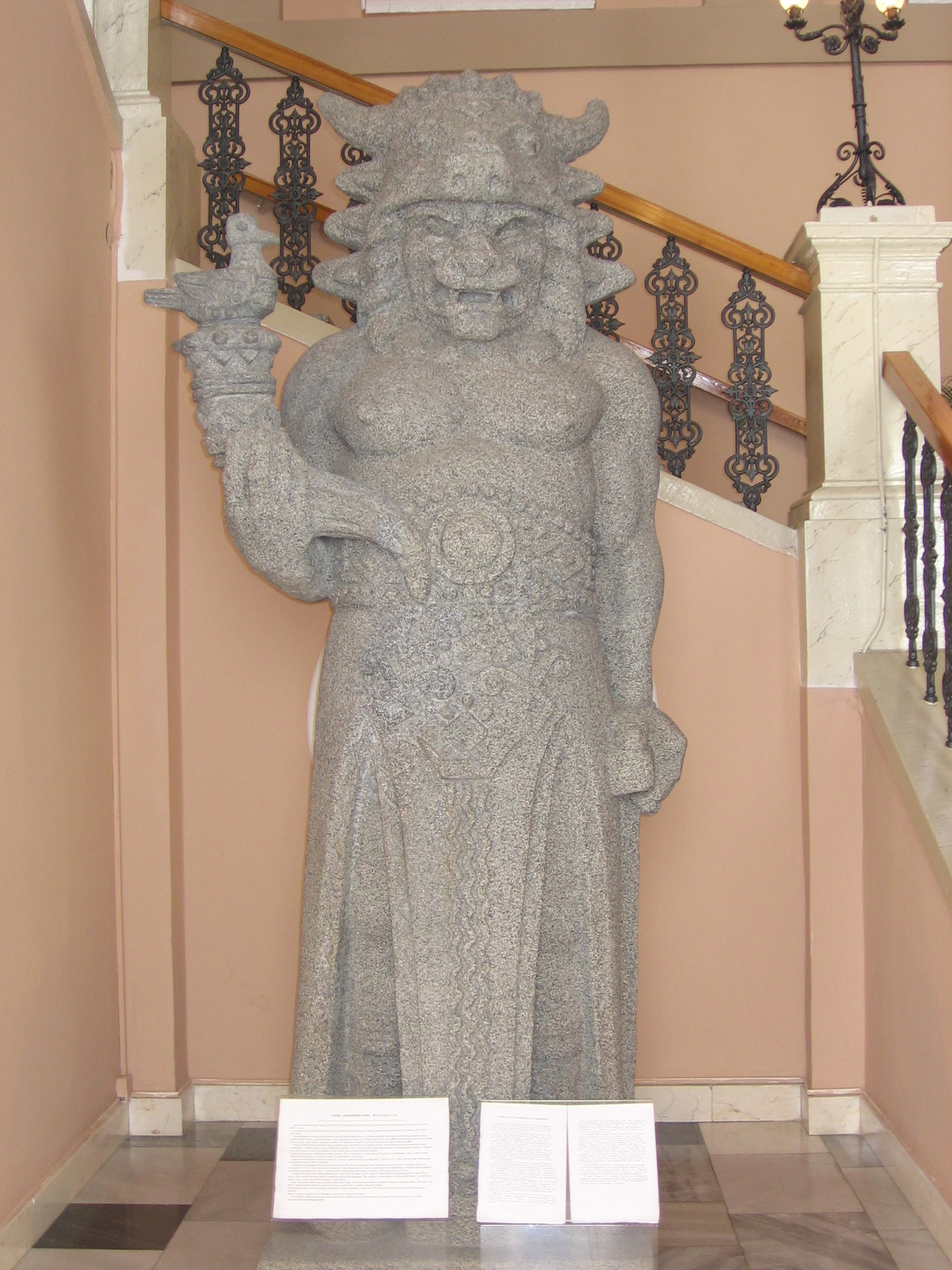
The first original statue of Radegast located in the town hall of Frenštát pod Radhoštěm

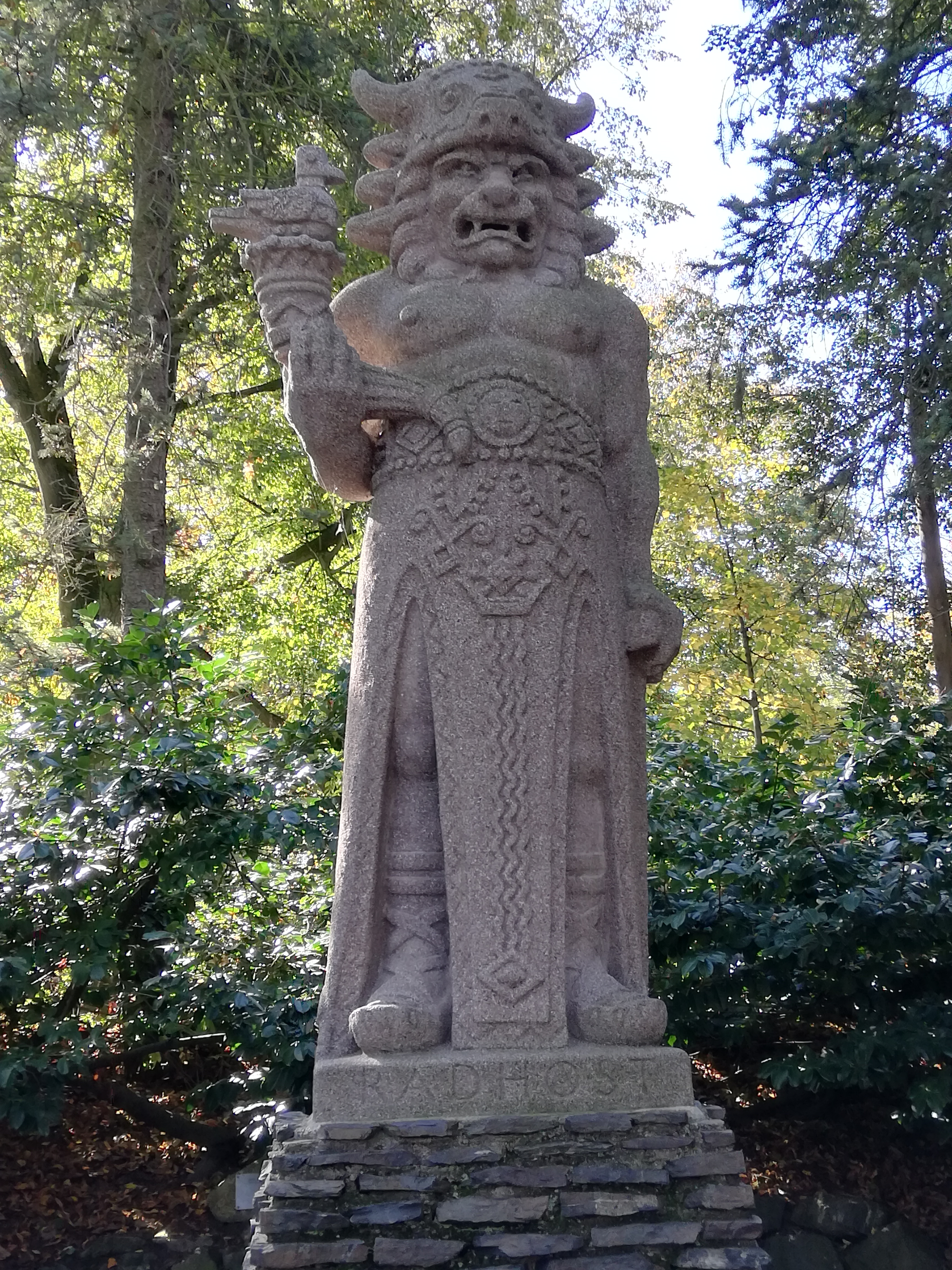
The second original sculpture of Radegast located in the Prague Zoo
