= Pustevny =

Coordinates: 49.4903°N 18.2658°E

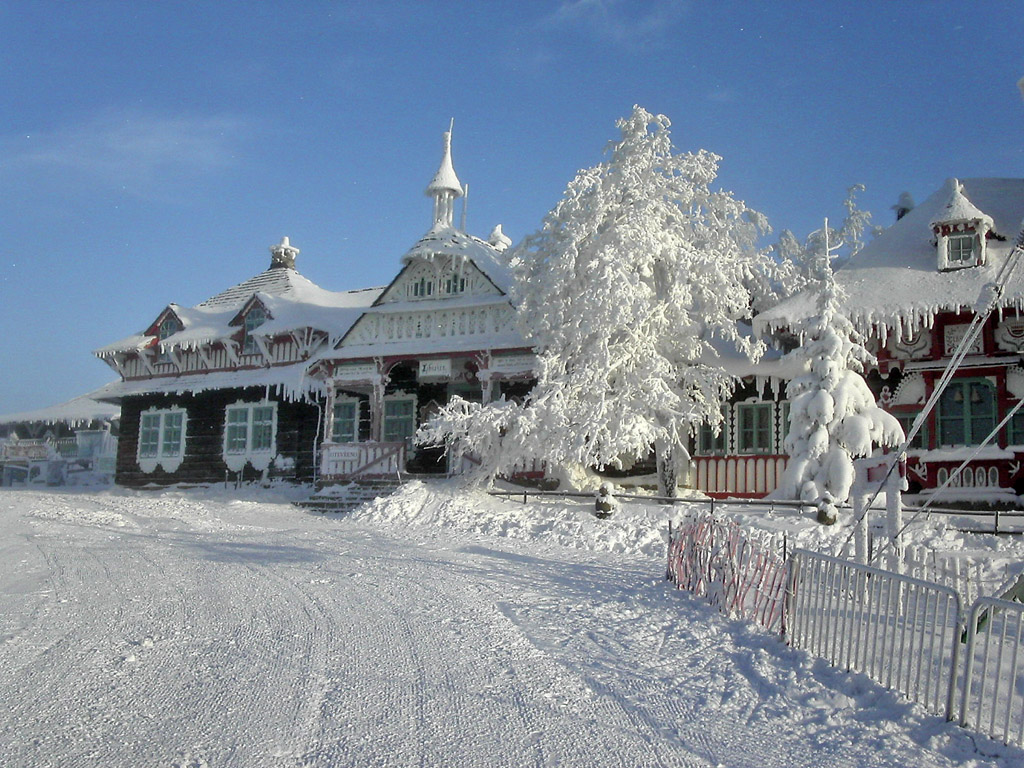
Pustevny in winter

Pustevny (1018 metres above sea level) is a mountain saddle in the Moravian-Silesian Beskids mountain range of the Czech Republic, not far from Radhošť, in the municipality of Prostřední Bečva. It was named after the Czech word for a hermit. Hermits lived here until the year 1874. For Pustevny, wooden buildings built in traditional folk style are typical. They were built and designed in the end of the 19th century by the architect Dušan Jurkovič.

There is also a skiing area.

== Buildings ==
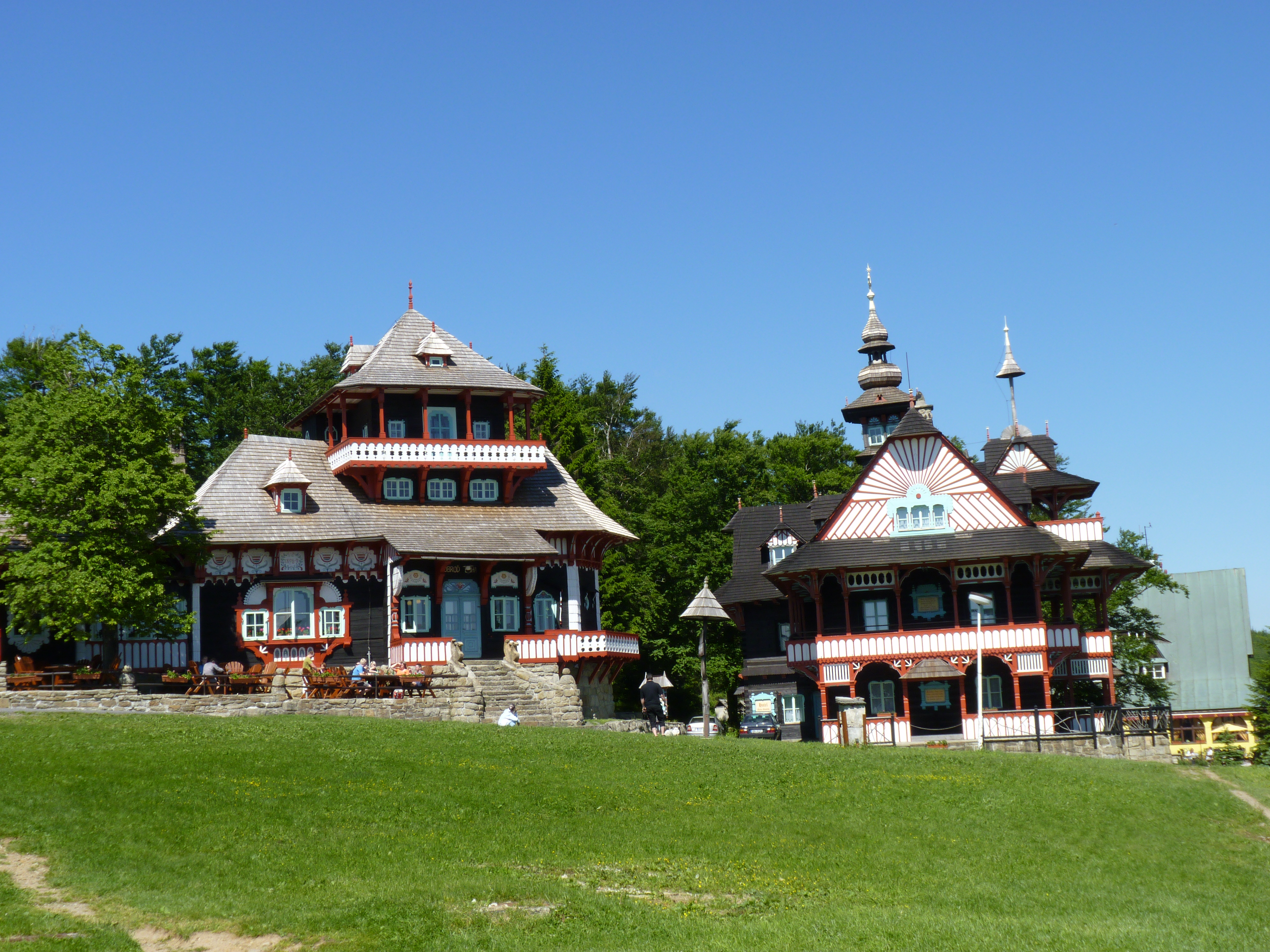
Left - Libušín, right - Maměnka

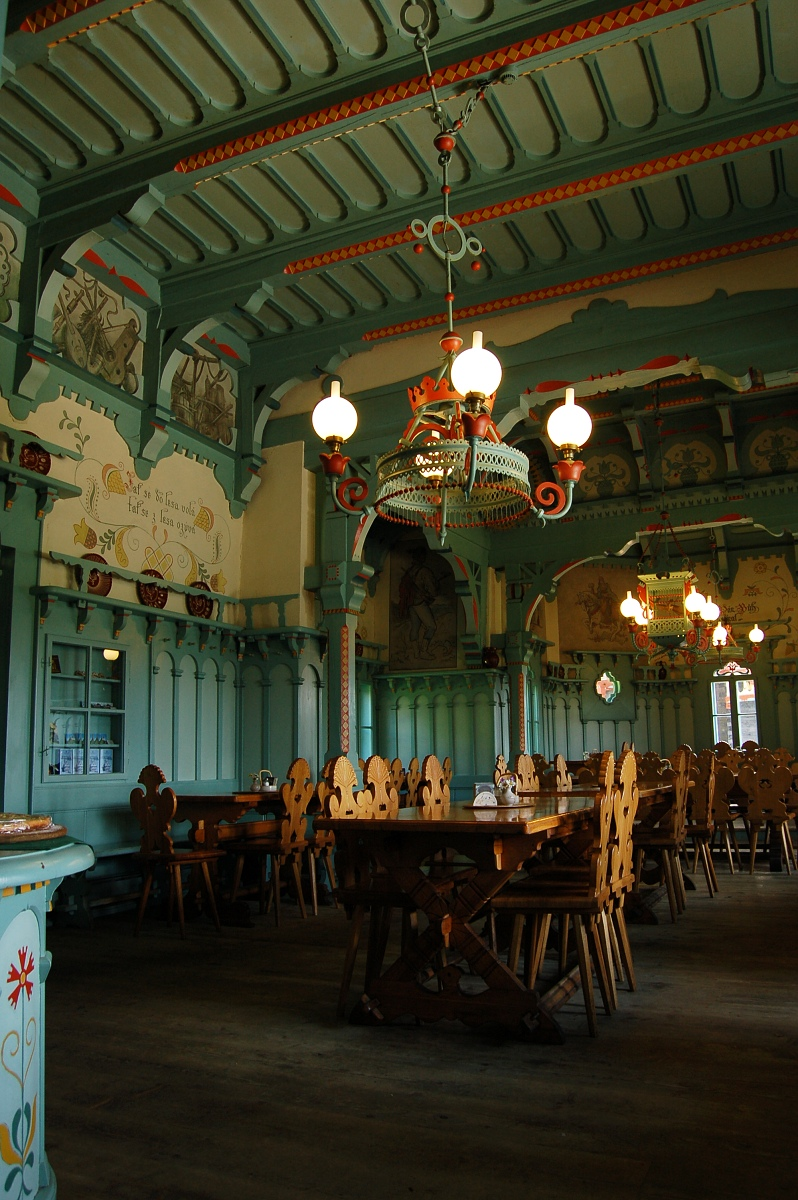
Interior of Libušín

=== Libušín and Maměnka ===
The most famous buildings on Pustevny are Libušín and Maměnka. Both of them were built in 1898 thanks to the efforts of the touristic club Pohorská jednota Radhošť. They are richly decorated log buildings, typical for the Valašsko region and Slavic architecture in general. On March 3, 2014, Libušín was heavily damaged by fire.

=== Bell tower on Pustevny ===
Among the other important buildings is also the bell tower also designed by Dušan Jurkovič. Although the original paintings have not been preserved, it has been restored according to the other buildings.

=== Other buildings in the area ===
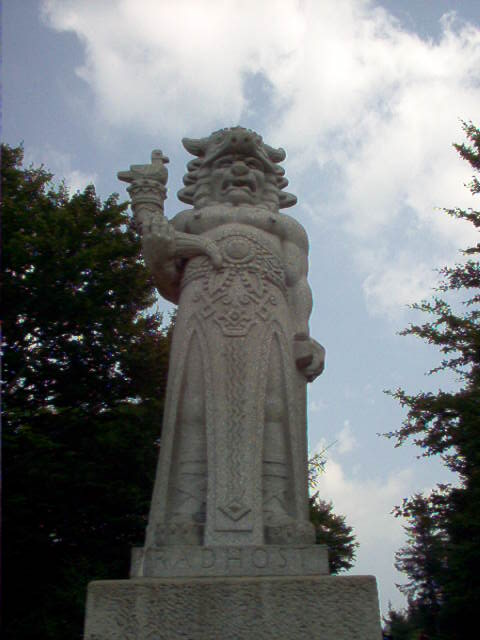
Pagan god Radegast

A footpath leads along the ridge from Pustevny to the peak of Radhošť. There is a chapel built in 1898 and a sculpture of Saints Cyril and Methodius from the year 1905. Halfway to Radhošť from Pustevny is the statue of the pagan Slavic god Radegast from the year 1931.

=== Skiing area Pustevny ===
A skiing area of the same name also belongs to Pustevny. There are 11 lifts and one chairlift. The saddle is accessible by a chairlift from Ráztoka. This lift was the first chairlift built in Europe.

== See also ==
- Rožnov pod Radhoštěm
