= Albin Polasek =

Czech-born American sculptor (1879-1965)

- Albín Polášek
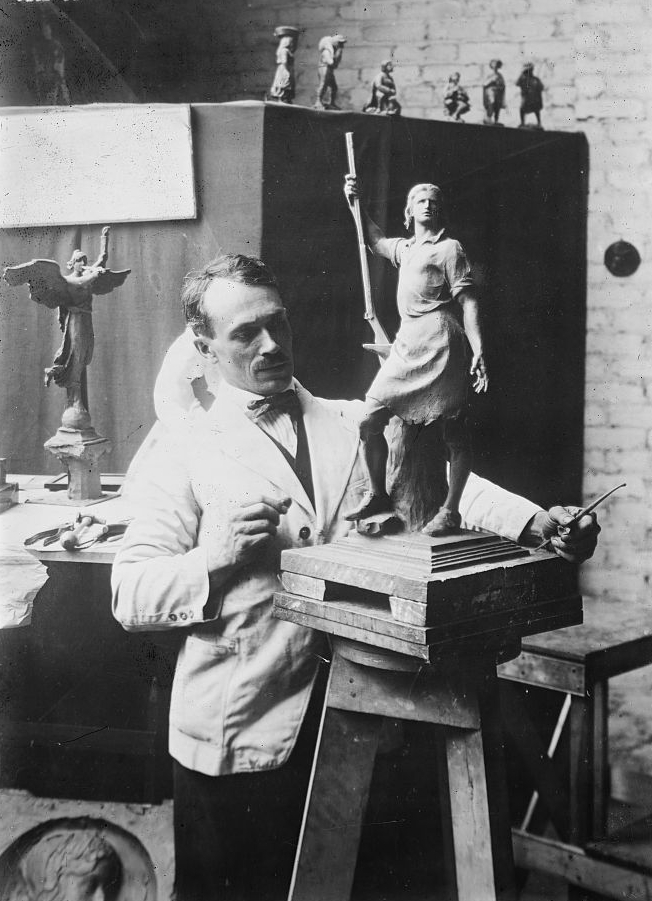
- Albin Polasek
- Born: 14 February 1879; Frenštát, Moravia, Austria-Hungary
- Died: 19 May 1965 (aged 86)
- Burial place: Palm Cemetery, Winter Park, Florida, United States
- Citizenship: Austria-Hungary, United States
- Education: Pennsylvania Academy of the Fine Arts
- Occupations: Sculptor, medalist, teacher
- Spouse(s): Ruth Sherwood (m. 1950–1952); Emily Muska Kubat (m. 1961–1965)
- Awards: Rome Prize (1910)

Albin Polasek (born Albín Polášek; 14 February 1879 – 19 May 1965) was a Czech-born American sculptor and educator. A practicing artist, he also headed the sculpture department at the School of the Art Institute of Chicago. He created more than four hundred works during his career, two hundred of which are displayed in the Albin Polasek Museum & Sculpture Gardens in Winter Park, Florida.

== Career ==
Born as Albín Polášek on 14 February 1879, in Frenštát, Moravia, part of Austria-Hungary (now in the Czech Republic), Polášek apprenticed as a wood carver in Vienna.

In 1901, at the age of 22, he emigrated to the United States and began formal art training at age 25 under Charles Grafly at the Pennsylvania Academy of the Fine Arts in Philadelphia. As a student, he first produced Man Carving His Own Destiny (1907) and Eternal Moment (1909).

In 1909, Polášek became an American citizen; in 1910, he won the Rome Prize competition; in 1913, he received honorable mention at the Paris Salon for "The Sower"; in 1915, he took the Widener Gold Medal from the Pennsylvania Academy of the Fine Arts for his sculpture "Aspiration".

At age 37, after periods of residence in Rome and New York City, he was invited to head the sculpture department at the Art Institute of Chicago, where he remained for nearly 30 years. While there he created the original Forest Idyl; Victorious Christ and Virgin of the Corn for St. Cecilia's Cathedral in Omaha, Nebraska; Kenilworth Memorial relief, Kenilworth, Illinois; The Spirit of Music in Grant Park in Chicago; the Woodrow Wilson Memorial in Prague, Czech Republic; Governor Richard Yates sculpture, capital grounds, Springfield, Illinois; and many other works. Polasek was elected an associate member of the National Academy of Design in 1927, and full member in 1933.

Albin Polasek was a close friend of fellow artist Louis Grell while he lived at Tree Studios in Chicago. The Grell Family archive collection contains letters by Grell discussing Polasek's move to Florida and becoming ill shortly after.

In 1950, Polasek retired at age 70 to Winter Park, Florida. Within months, he suffered a stroke which left his left side paralyzed; he subsequently completed 18 major works with his right hand only, including Victory of Moral Law (1957), the artist's comment on the 1956 Hungarian Revolution.

Toward the end of 1950, at age 71, he married former student Ruth Sherwood, who died 22 months later in October 1952. In 1961, Polasek married Emily Muska Kubat. Upon his death in 1965, Polasek was buried beside his first wife in Winter Park's Palm Cemetery, where his 12th Station of the Cross (1939) is his monument. Emily Muska Kubat Polasek died in 1988.

== Works ==
Polasek's better-known works include the Theodore Thomas Memorial (1924), the memorial to Tomáš Garrigue Masaryk in Chicago, the Wilson Memorial (1928), Radegast (1929) and Sts. Cyril and Methodius (1929) in the Czech Republic. His Mother Crying Over the World (1942) was a response to World War II and his Victory of Moral Law (1956) to the Hungarian Revolution.

== Cemetery monuments ==
Like many other sculptors of his era, Polasek created several cemetery memorials. Notable among these are The Pilgrim and The Mother (1927), both located in the Bohemian National Cemetery in Chicago, and the Pilgrim at the Eternal Gate in Lake View Cemetery in Cleveland, Ohio. Pictures of all three are featured in both biographies listed in the sources section.

== Gallery ==
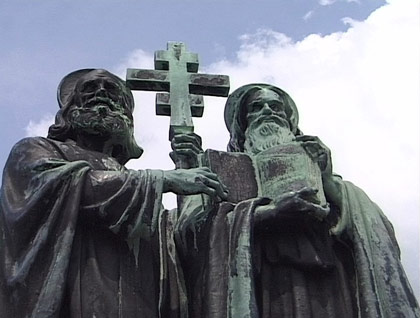
Sts. Cyril and Methodius

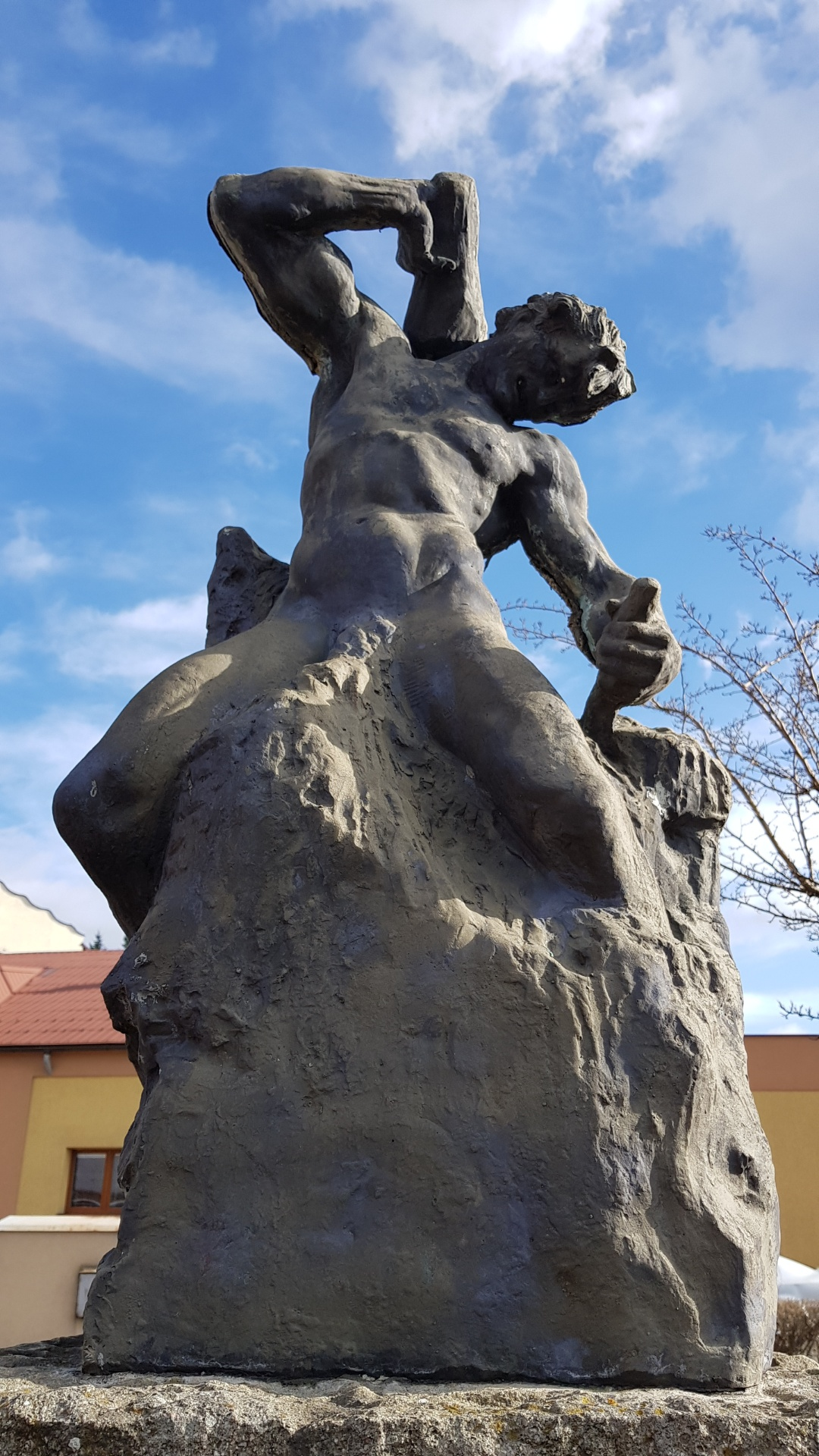
Man carving his own destiny

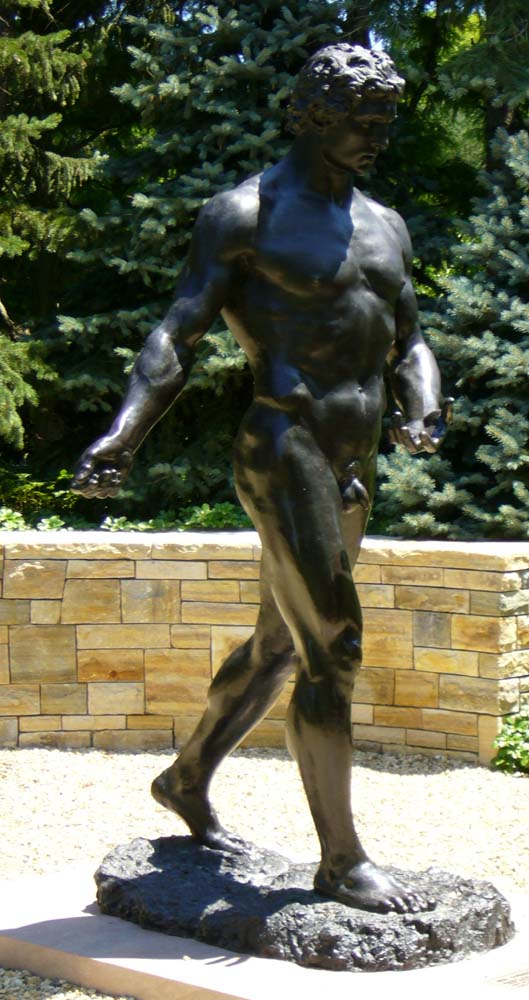
The Sower, 1911

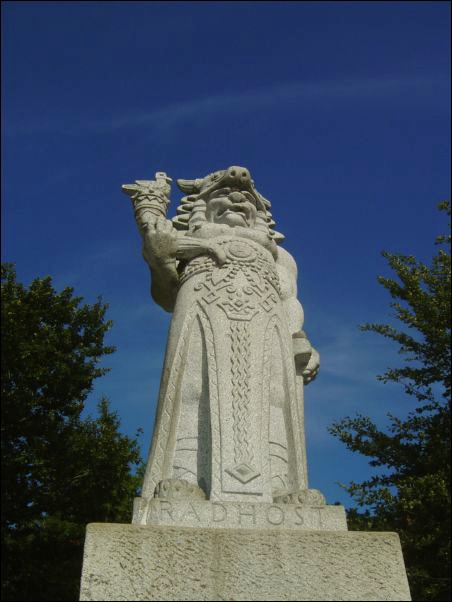
Radegast

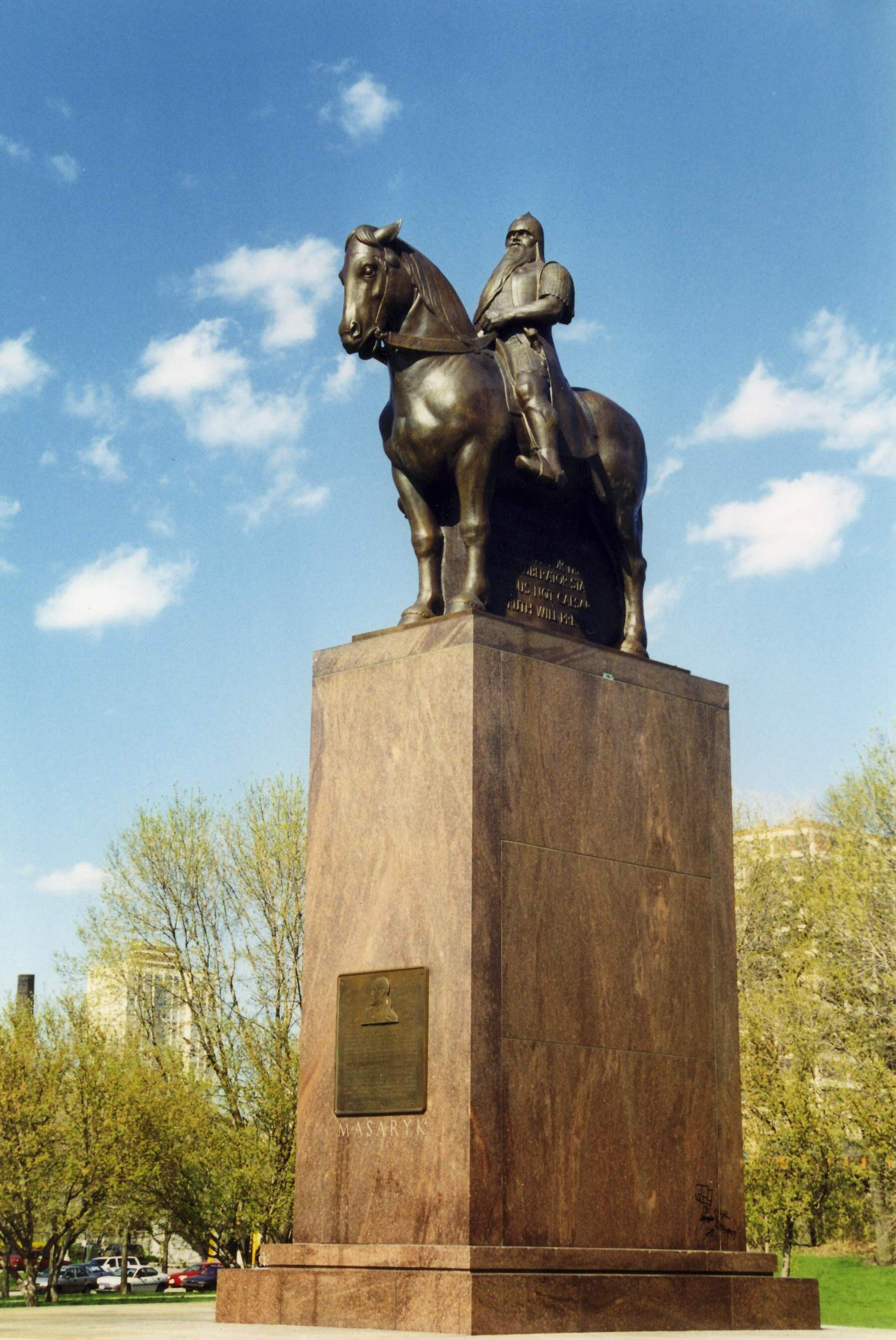
Tomáš Masaryk Memorial, Chicago

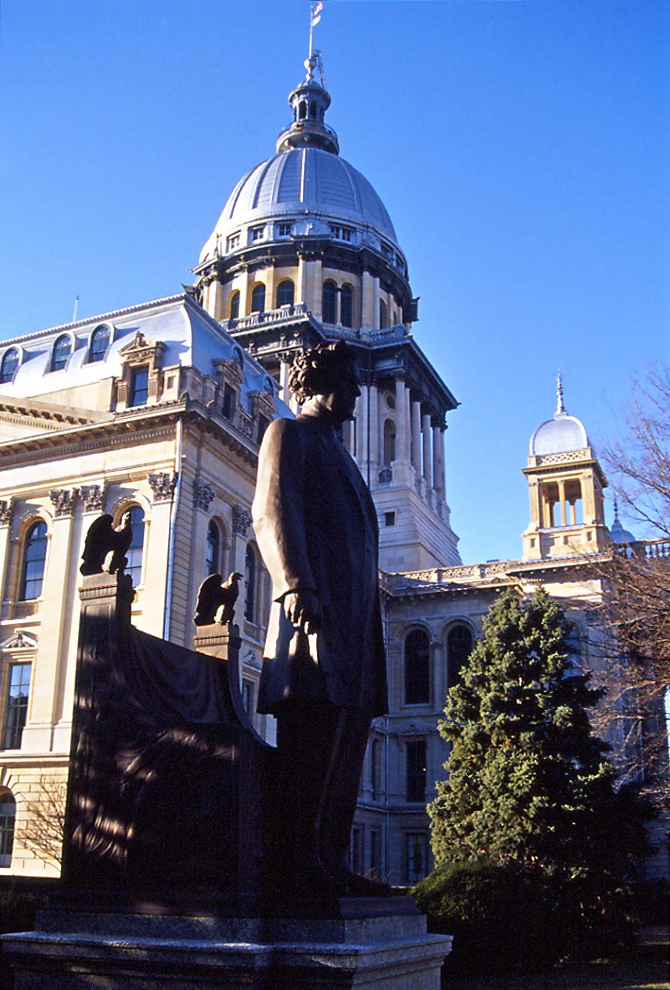
Yates Memorial, Springfield, Illinois, 1923

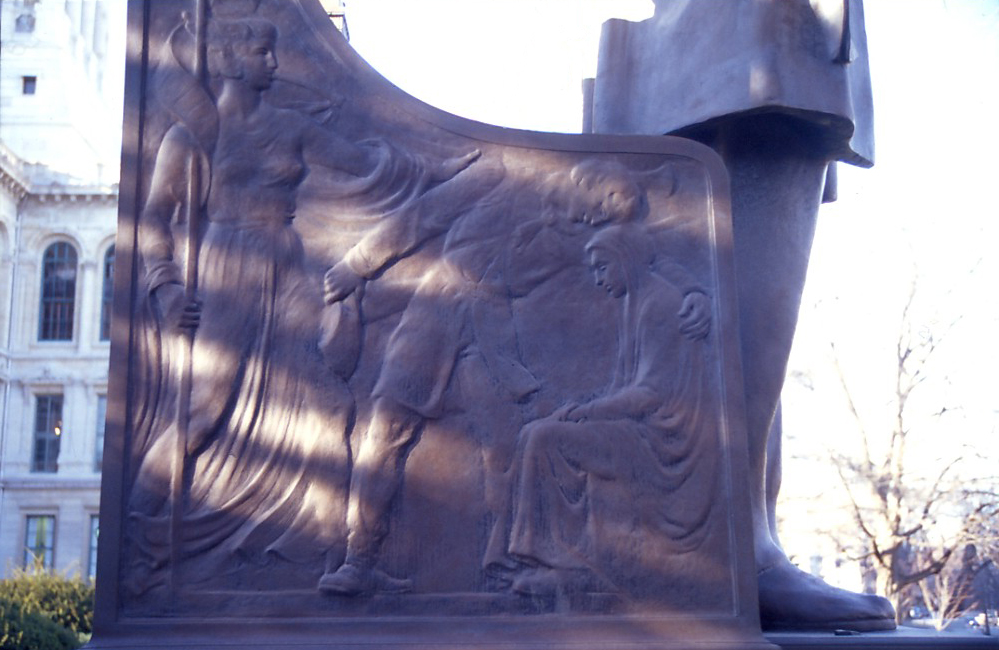
detail, Yates Memorial

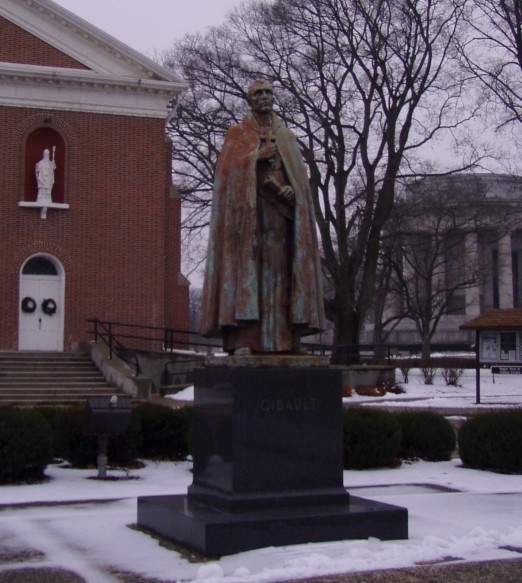
Pierre Gibault, Vincennes, Indiana, 1934
