= Esko Moravian-Silesian Region =

Commuter rail system in the Moravian-Silesian Region, Czech Republic

Overview
- Locale: Moravian-Silesian Region
- Transit type: Commuter rail
- Number of lines: 24

Operation
- Began operation: 2008
- Operator: České dráhy

Technical
- Track gauge: 1,435 mm (4 ft 8 1/2 in) (standard gauge)
System map

Esko Moravian-Silesian Region is a commuter rail system in the Moravian-Silesian Region of the Czech Republic. The integrated system began on 14 December 2008. Esko is part of the ODIS Integrated Transport system serving the Moravian-Silesian Region. The Esko trains are operated by České dráhy, the state railway operator

== Lines ==
Line	Stretch	Length /km	Stations
S1	Opava východ – Ostrava-Svinov – Ostrava-Vítkovice – Havířov – Český Těšín	69	23
S2	Studénka - Ostrava-Svinov – Ostrava hl.n. - Bohumín - Karviná - Český Těšín - Třinec - Mosty u Jablunkova	72	21
S3	Bohumín – Ostrava hl.n. – Ostrava-Svinov – Studénka – Suchdol nad Odrou – Polom - Hranice na Moravě - Přerov)	46	10
S4	Bohumín - Ostrava hl.n. - Ostrava-Svinov - Studénka - Mošnov, Ostrava Airport	39	9
S5	Frýdlant nad Ostravicí - Ostravice	7	5
S6	Ostrava hl.n. – Ostrava střed - Frýdek-Místek - Frýdlant nad Ostravicí - Frenštát pod Radhoštěm - Veřovice - Valašské Meziříčí	72	20
S7	Frýdek-Místek – Český Těšín	27	9
S8	Studénka – Příbor - Kopřivnice – Štramberk - Veřovice	27	9
S10	Opava východ – Krnov - Bruntál - Rýmařov	75	19
S11	Opava východ – Kravaře ve Slezsku – Hlučín	22	10
S12	Kravaře ve Slezsku – Chuchelná	10	4
S13	Opava východ – Hradec nad Moravicí	8	4
S15	Krnov – Třemešná ve Slezsku – Jindřichov ve Slezsku (- Jeseník)	23	6
S16	Třemešná ve Slezsku – Slezské Rudoltice - Osoblaha	20	9
S17	Milotice nad Opavou – Vrbno pod Pradědem	20	10
S21	Bohumín – Dětmarovice – Petrovice u Karviné	14	5
S22	Mosty u Jablunkova – Mosty u Jablunkova zastávka (- Čadca)	2	2
S31	Studénka – Bílovec	7	4
S32	Suchdol nad Odrou – Hladké Životice – Fulnek	10	4
S33	Suchdol nad Odrou – Odry – Vítkov - Budišov nad Budišovkou	39	11
S34	Suchdol nad Odrou – Nový Jičín město	8	3
R61	Opava východ – Ostrava-Svinov – Ostrava hl.n. – Ostrava střed – Havířov – Český Těšín	69	16
R8	Bohumín – Ostrava hl.n. – Ostrava-Svinov - Studénka – Suchdol nad Odrou	42	5
R27	Ostrava střed - Ostrava hl.n. - Ostrava-Svinov – Opava východ – Krnov - Bruntál - Moravský Beroun	116	14
Total		599	160
