= Kopřivnice =

- Town
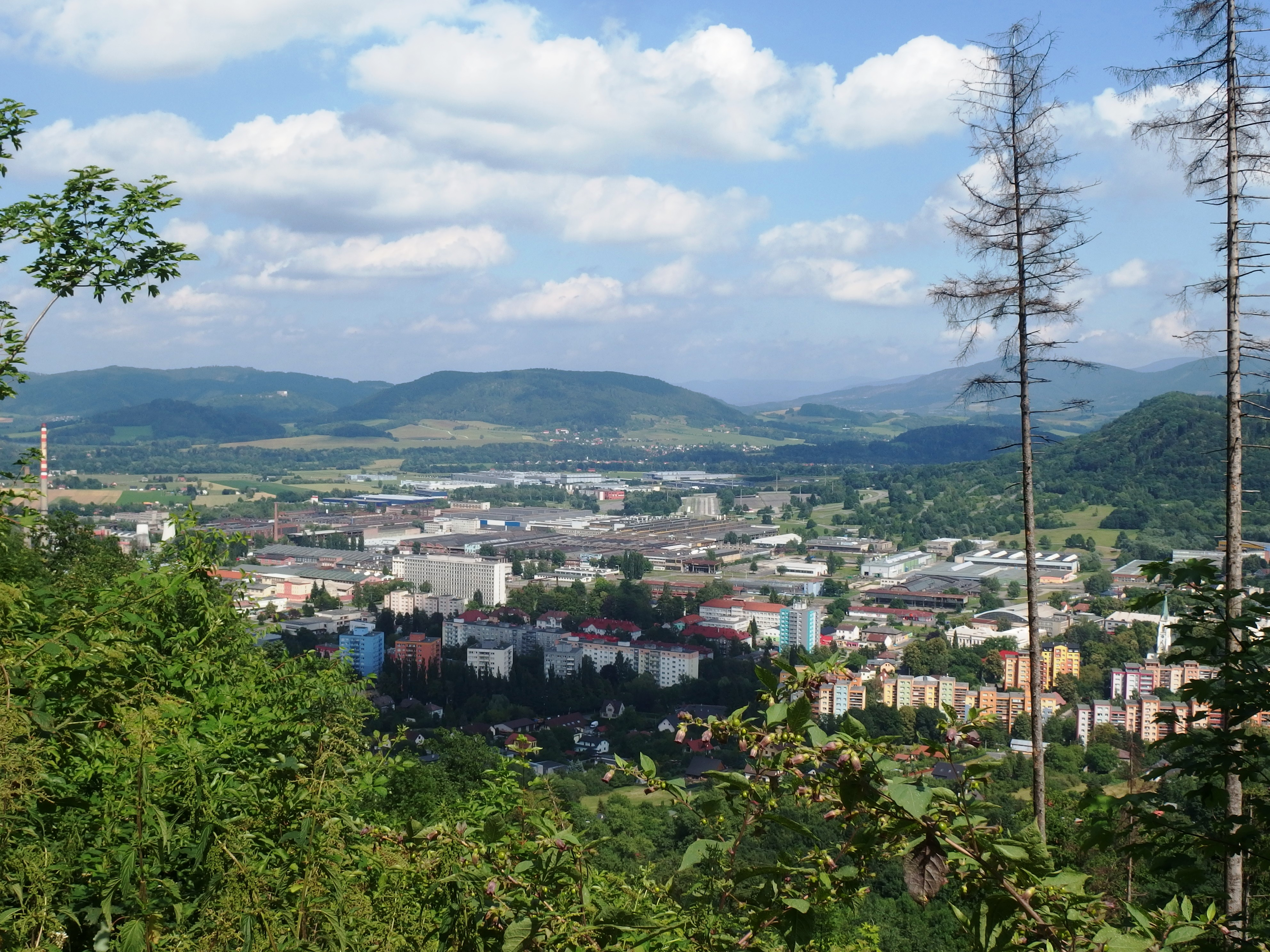
- General view of the town

- Flag Coat of arms

- Location in the Czech Republic
- Coordinates: 49°35′58″N 18°8′41″E
- Country: Czech Republic
- Region: Moravian-Silesian
- District: Nový Jičín
- First mentioned: 1437

Government
  - Mayor: Adam Hanus

Area
  - Total: 27.49 km^{2} (10.61 sq mi)
- Elevation: 320 m (1,050 ft)

Population (2026-01-01)
  - Total: 21,245
  - Density: 772.8/km^{2} (2,002/sq mi)
- Time zone: UTC+1 (CET)
  - Summer (DST): UTC+2 (CEST)
- Postal code: 742 21
- Website: www.koprivnice.cz

Kopřivnice (Czech pronunciation: [ˈkopr̝̊ɪvɲɪtsɛ]; German: Nesselsdorf) is a town in Nový Jičín District in the Moravian-Silesian Region of the Czech Republic. It has about 21,000 inhabitants. The town is located in a valley in the Moravian-Silesian Foothills.

Kopřivnice is known as a centre of industry. Until the industrialisation in the 19th century, Kopřivnice was just a village. Präsident, the first series-produced automobile in Austria-Hungary, was designed and manufactured in Kopřivnice, and the automotive industry is still important to the town today. Tatra Trucks, one of the oldest motor vehicle manufacturers in the world, is based here.

The town is home to five museums, including the Tatra Truck Museum, the Tatra Passenger Car Museum and the Fojtství Museum. Fojtství is the town's oldest building and the birthplace of Ignaz Schustala, the founder of the original car factory. Among notable natives are long-distance runner Emil Zátopek and painter and paleoartist Zdeněk Burian.

== Administrative division ==
Kopřivnice consists of four municipal parts (in brackets population according to the 2021 census):

- Kopřivnice (17,777)
- Lubina (1,850)
- Mniší (788)
- Vlčovice (604)

== Etymology ==
Both the Czech name Kopřivnice and the German name Nesselsdorf are derived from 'nettle' (kopřiva in Czech, Nessel in German). The name refers to the probable founder of Šostýn Castle (German: Schauenstein), Bishop Bruno von Schauenburg, who had a nettle in his coat of arms.

== Geography ==
Kopřivnice is located about 9 kilometres (6 mi) east of Nový Jičín and 23 km (14 mi) south of Ostrava. It lies in the Moravian-Silesian Foothills. The highest point is the hill Pískovna at 584 m (1,916 ft) above sea level. The town proper is situated on the Kopřivnička Stream. The stream flows to the Lubina River, which flows through the northern and eastern part of the territory of Kopřivnice.

Větřkovice Reservoir is located in the territory. Completed in 1976, it serves as a water supply for the Tatra Trucks company and the industrial zone, as a recreational area, and for fish farming.

== History ==
The Šoštýn Castle was founded around 1280–1290 and was first documented in 1347. The settlement was probably established soon after the castle. The first written mention of Kopřivnice is from 1437, when the castle and its surroundings were bought by Emperor Sigismund and joined to the Hukvaldy estate. In 1465, the estate was owned by King George of Poděbrady, who sold it a year later to Olomouc bishop Tas of Boskovice. Kopřivnice then became a property of the Olomouc bishopric.

For centuries, Kopřivnice remained only a village that did not escape the invasions of troops during the Thirty Years' War, natural disasters, crop failures, or epidemics. A turning point in the history of Kopřivnice was the establishment of a factory for earthenware in 1812. The factory gained fame throughout the whole Austria-Hungary with its products, and existed until 1962. The main driving force of industrialisation was the carriage factory of Ignaz Schustala. In the early 20th century, the factory employed 5,000 workers, which forced the construction of additional residential houses. Thanks to the overall growth, Kopřivnice was promoted to a market town in 1910.

During World War II, Kopřivnice was annexed by Nazi Germany. The German-speaking population was expelled in 1945 according to the Beneš Decrees. In 1948, Kopřivnice became a town.

In 1950, the municipalities of Drnholec nad Lubinou and Větřkovice merged and formed the municipality of Lubina. In 1979, Lubina was joined to Kopřivnice, Mniší and Vlčovice were joined in 1980. Závišice was a part of Kopřivnice from 1976 to 1990. In 1990, it became an independent municipality.

== Demographics ==
Historical population

Year	Pop.	±%
1869	3,090	—
1880	3,193	+3.3%
1890	3,833	+20.0%
1900	5,309	+38.5%
1910	6,396	+20.5%

Year	Pop.	±%
1921	7,071	+10.6%
1930	7,276	+2.9%
1950	7,829	+7.6%
1961	9,689	+23.8%
1970	12,917	+33.3%

Year	Pop.	±%
1980	19,044	+47.4%
1991	24,102	+26.6%
2001	23,747	−1.5%
2011	22,174	−6.6%
2021	21,019	−5.2%

Source: Censuses

== Economy ==
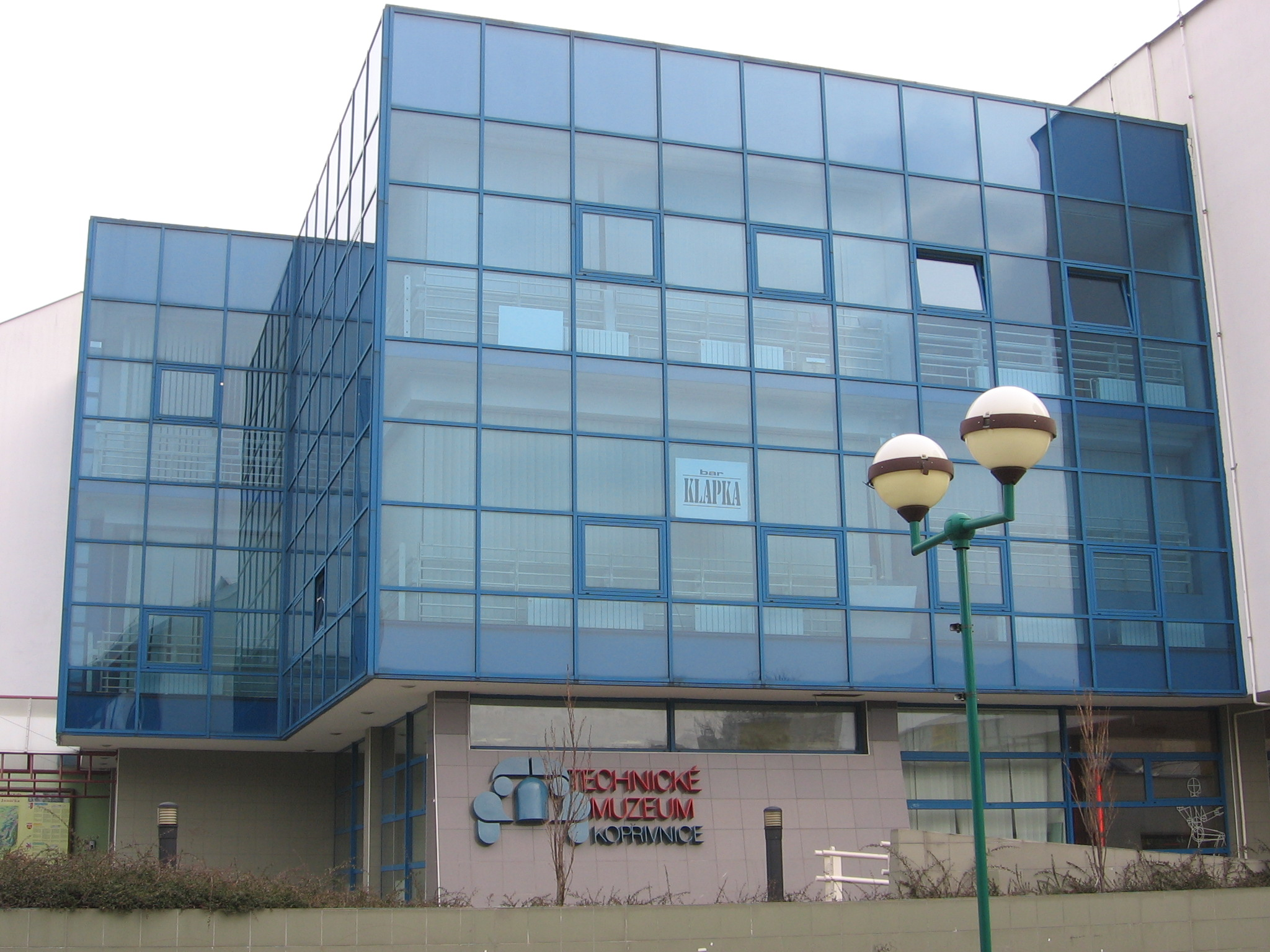
Tatra Technical Museum

Kopřivnice is known for the automotive and transportation industry, represented by the Tatra company. The company is one of the oldest manufacturers of vehicles with a continuous history in the world. In 1850, Ignaz Schustala started making here carriages, later the production of railway wagons was added. The first passenger car Präsident was manufactured in 1897, the first truck in 1898. After World War II, trucks became the mainstay of production.

After restructuring in 2013, the company changed its name to Tatra Trucks. As of 2020, Tatra Trucks employs more than 1,000 people. Tatra Metalurgie, a subsidiary focusing on foundry and forging, employs about 600 people.

There is also a large industrial zone with several major companies, mainly focused on production of automotive components. The largest employer of them is Brose CZ. Other engineering companies based in Kopřivnice include Tawesco, a manufacturer of stamped and welded components for the automotive and machinery industries.

== Transport ==
The I/58 road from Ostrava to Rožnov pod Radhoštěm passes through the town.

Kopřivnice is located on the railway lines Ostrava–Štramberk and Studénka–Veřovice. The town is served by two train stations: Kopřivnice and Kopřivnice zastávka.

== Sport ==
The main sports facility is the stadium Stadion Emila Zátopka. It is a multi-purpose stadium that hosts football, athletics and motorcycle speedway. There are also volleyball courts and a clay tennis court. It has a capacity of 9,000 people.

Kopřivnice is known for the Athletics Club of Emil Zátopek Kopřivnice. Like the local stadium, the club also bears the name of Emil Zátopek, a local native who is one of the most important Czech sportsmen of all time.

The town is represented by the football club FC Kopřivnice. It plays in lower amateur tiers.

The speedway team SPT PROFIL Team Kopřivnice competes in the Czech Republic Team Speedway Championship.

== Sights ==
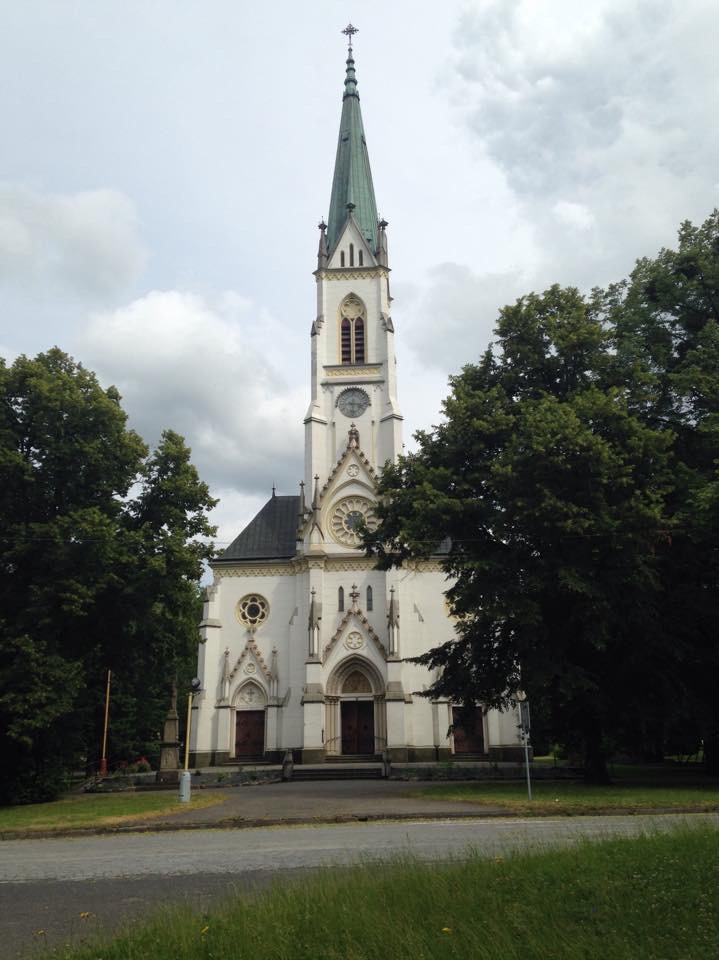
Church of St. Bartholomew

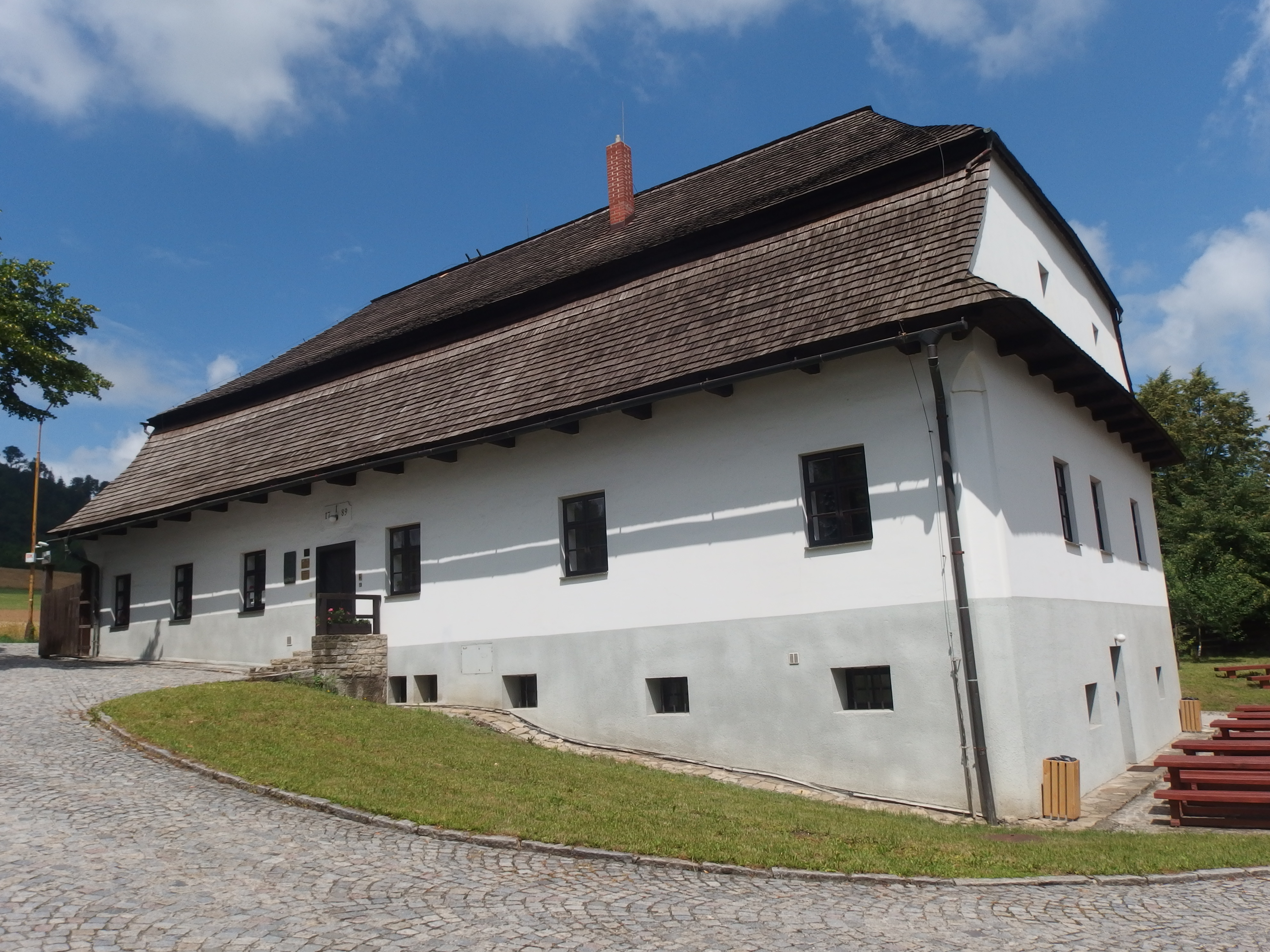
Fojtství Museum

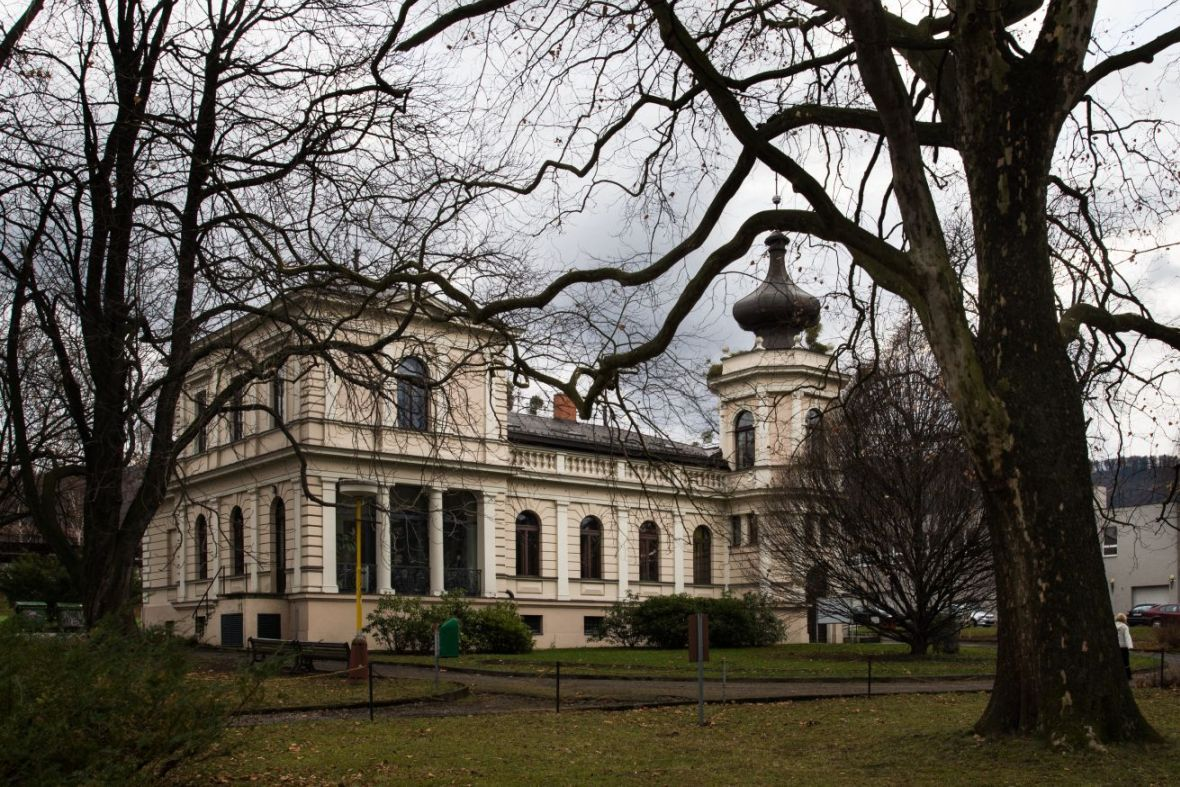
Schustala's Villa with the Lachian Museum

The Church of Saint Bartholomew is the landmark of the town. The neo-Gothic church was built in 1893–1894. Some of the works of art that adorn it come from the original old wooden church, which stood next to Fojtství (lit. 'Advocatus' residence').

Fojtství is the oldest preserved building in the town. The original wooden building from 1576 was rebuilt to its current form in 1789. It houses the Fojtství Museum that is dedicated to the history of the town. It also includes a barn, where Ignaz Schustala started making carriages and laid the foundation for the Tatra factory.

There are several museums that reflect the town's industrial tradition. The Tatra Technical Museum has a complete collection of Tatra passenger cars. The Oldtimer Kopřivnice Auto-Moto-Museum presents an exhibition of historic vehicles and motorcycles of famous brands from around the world.

The Tatra Trucks Museum, opened in 2021, presents an exposition of Tatra trucks. The museum also manages the depository of the Slovenská strela train. Slovenská strela is a unique train, the only movable national cultural monument in the Moravian-Silesian Region, manufactured in Kopřivnice in 1936. The building of the depository is an architecturally awarded Building of the Year 2021 of the Czech Republic.

The Lachian Museum is located in the Schustala's villa. The villa was built in the Neoclassical style in 1889, for the local carriage factory owner Josef Schustala. The exposition of Dana and Emil Zátopek, who is among the most famous natives, is also located here.

Šostýn Castle is a Gothic castle from the late 13th century. The castle was conquered and destroyed in the 15th century. Today the ruin consists of the remains of a massive palace, two circuits of ramparts with moats, and the foundations of a cylindrical tower. On the neighbouring hill is located the Bezruč Viewpoint, a 13 metres (43 ft) high wooden observation tower dedicated to poet Petr Bezruč.

== Notable people ==
- Ignaz Schustala (1822–1881), entrepreneur and Tatra founder
- Zdeněk Burian (1905–1981), painter
- Zdeňka Veřmiřovská (1913–1997), gymnast
- Emil Zátopek (1922–2000), athlete, Olympic winner
- Karel Loprais (1949–2021), rally raid driver; worked here
- Hana Šromová (born 1978), tennis player
- Tomáš Fleischmann (born 1984), ice hockey player
- Patrik Bartošák (born 1993), ice hockey player
- Adam Raška (born 2001), ice hockey player

== Twin towns – sister cities ==
Kopřivnice is twinned with:

- Bánovce nad Bebravou, Slovakia
- Castiglione del Lago, Italy
- Myszków, Poland
- Trappes, France
- Zwönitz, Germany
