= Studénka train disaster =

Studénka train disaster may refer to:

- 2008 Studénka train wreck, train disaster which occurred on 8 August 2008
- 2015 Studénka train crash, train crash which occurred on 22 July 2015
