= Třemešná =

- Municipality
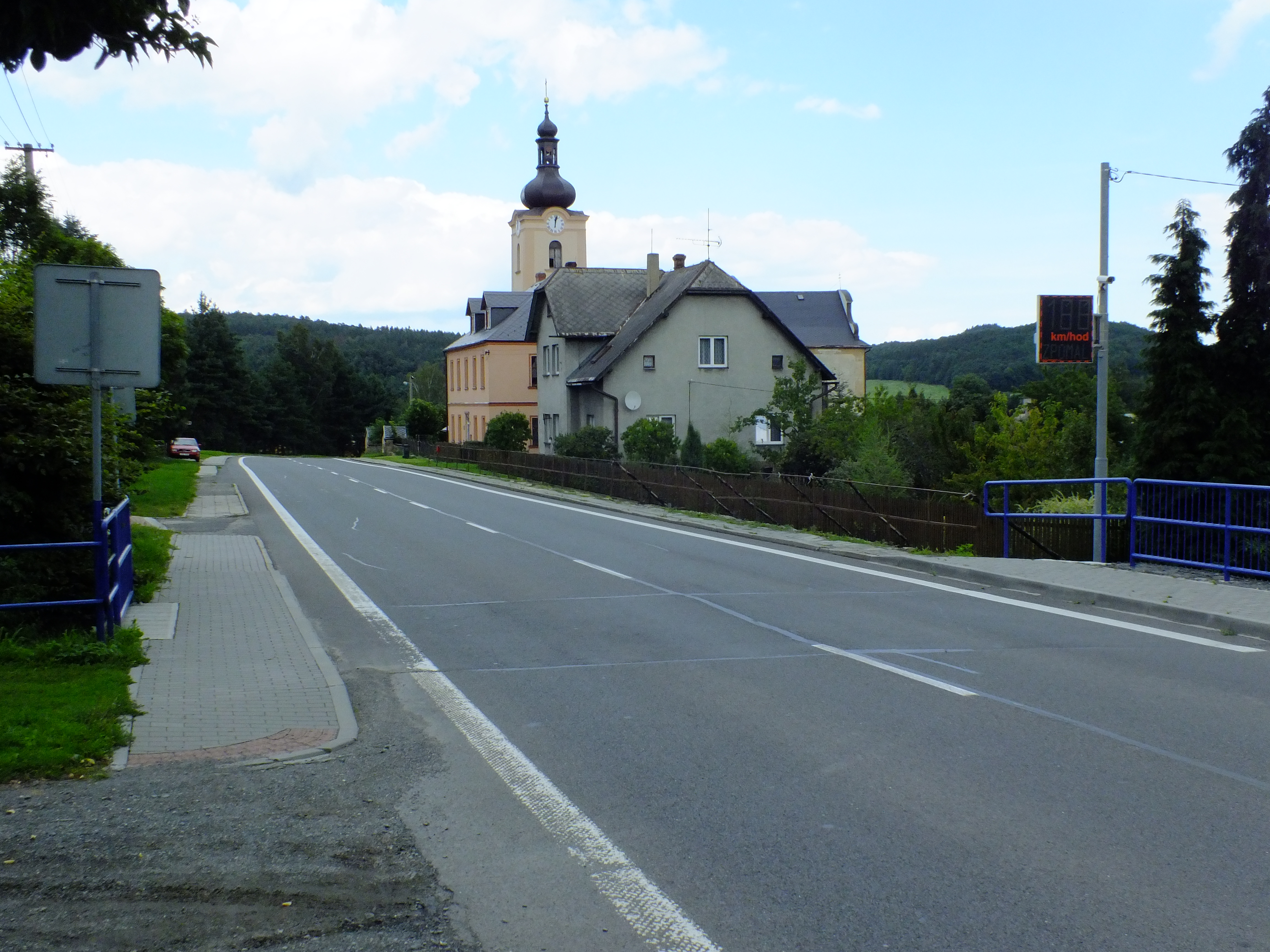
- Main road

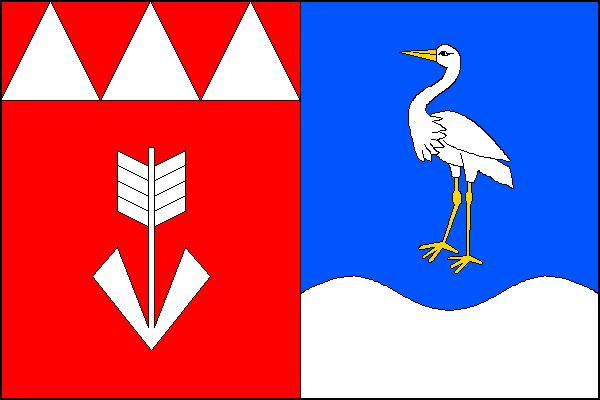
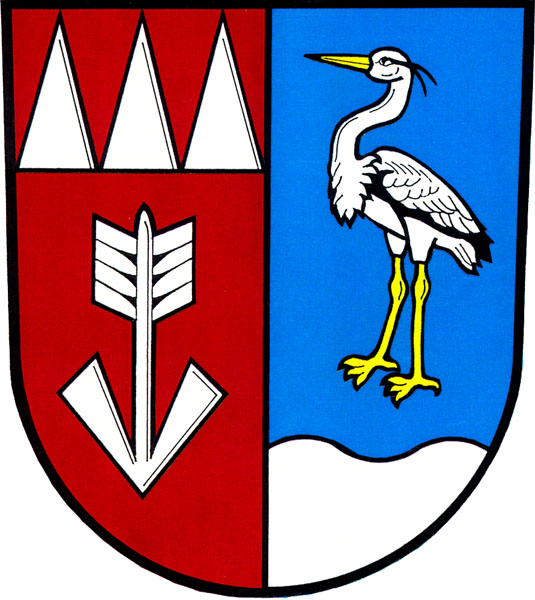
- Flag Coat of arms

- Location in the Czech Republic
- Coordinates: 50°12′19″N 17°34′30″E
- Country: Czech Republic
- Region: Moravian-Silesian
- District: Bruntál
- First mentioned: 1256

Area
  - Total: 20.97 km^{2} (8.10 sq mi)
- Elevation: 365 m (1,198 ft)

Population (2026-01-01)
  - Total: 870
  - Density: 41/km^{2} (110/sq mi)
- Time zone: UTC+1 (CET)
  - Summer (DST): UTC+2 (CEST)
- Postal code: 793 82
- Website: www.tremesna.cz

Třemešná (German: Röwersdorf) is a municipality and village in Bruntál District in the Moravian-Silesian Region of the Czech Republic. It has about 900 inhabitants.

== Administrative division ==
Třemešná consists of three municipal parts (in brackets population according to the 2021 census):

- Třemešná (693)
- Damašek (16)
- Rudíkovy (145)

== Geography ==
Třemešná is located about 25 kilometres (16 mi) north of Bruntál and 63 km (39 mi) northwest of Ostrava. It lies in the Osoblažsko microregion in the Zlatohorská Highlands. The highest point is at 678 m (2,224 ft) above sea level. The built-up area lies in the valley of the Mušlov Stream.

== History ==
The first written mention of Třemešná is from 1256. It was one of the settlements that were founded in the area around 1251 at the initiative of the bishop Bruno von Schauenburg. In 1428, during the Hussite Wars, Třemešná was completely destroyed. The village was resettled by ethnic Germans in 1535.

== Demographics ==
Historical population

Year	Pop.	±%
1869	3,179	—
1880	3,131	−1.5%
1890	2,783	−11.1%
1900	2,389	−14.2%
1910	2,156	−9.8%

Year	Pop.	±%
1921	2,001	−7.2%
1930	2,050	+2.4%
1950	1,156	−43.6%
1961	1,304	+12.8%
1970	1,140	−12.6%

Year	Pop.	±%
1980	1,110	−2.6%
1991	984	−11.4%
2001	971	−1.3%
2011	904	−6.9%
2021	854	−5.5%

Source: Censuses

== Transport ==
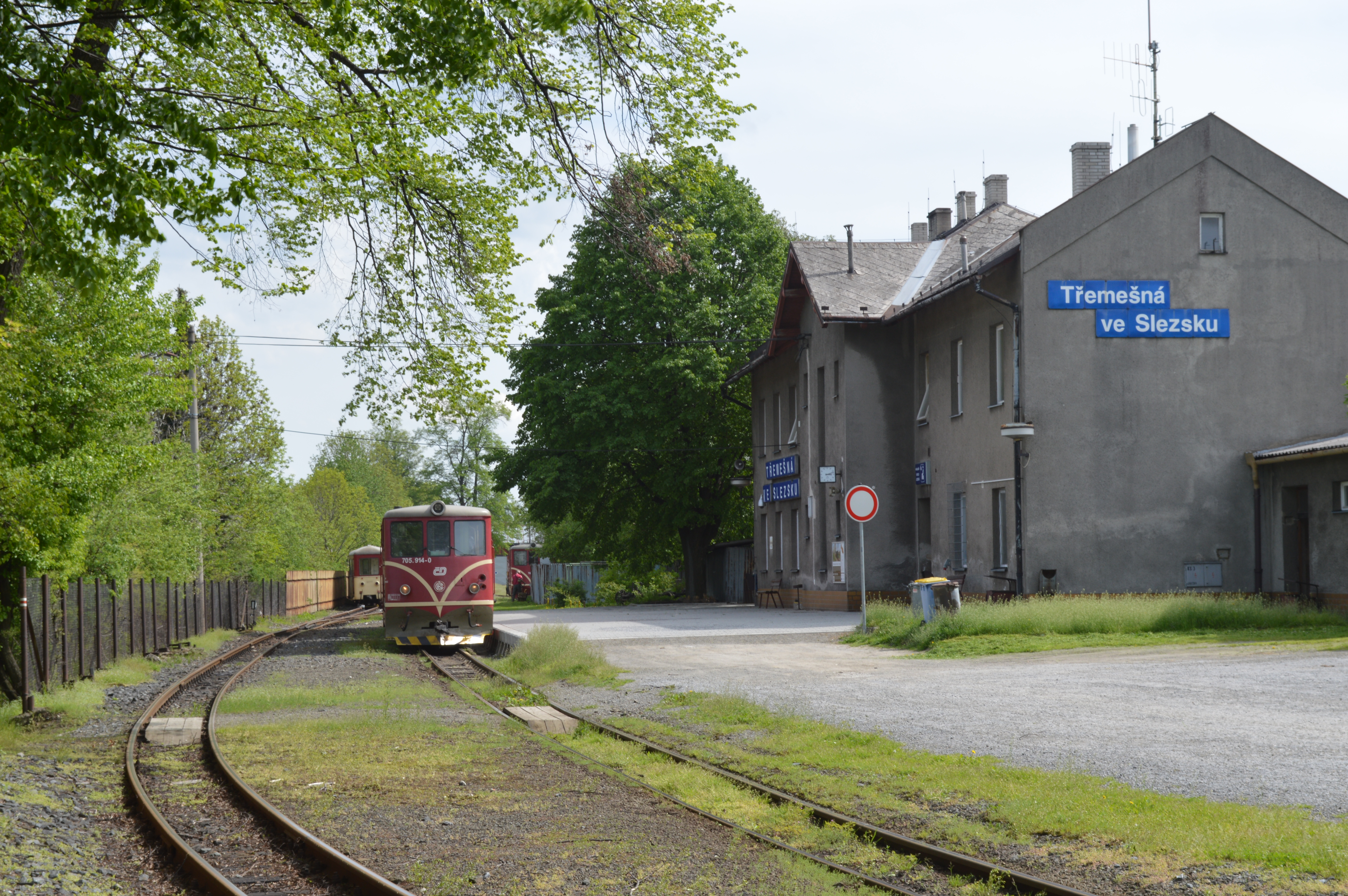
Train station

Třemešná is located on the Krnov–Głuchołazy–Jeseník railway line. It is also the starting point of the narrow-gauge Třemešná ve Slezsku–Osoblaha railway.

== Sights ==
The main landmark of the municipality is the Church of Saint Sebastian. It was built in 1730–1733. The tower was added in 1780.

The narrow-gauge railway serves not only for transport but also as a tourist attraction. Steam trains run on weekends during the tourist season.
