= Hugo Gorge =

Austrian architect

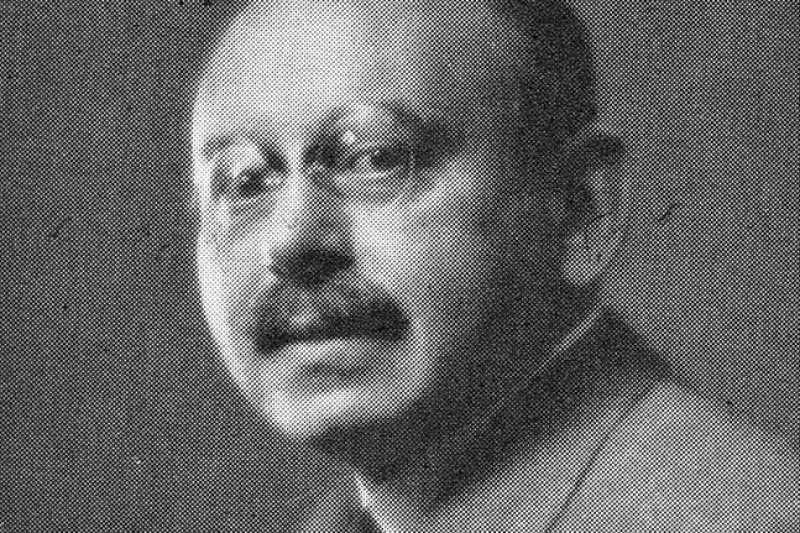
- Born: 31 January 1883; Studénka, Austria-Hungary
- Died: 25 December 1934 (aged 51); Vienna, Austria
- Occupation: Architect

Hugo Gorge (31 January 1883 – 25 December 1934) was an Austrian architect. His work was part of the architecture event in the art competition at the 1932 Summer Olympics.
