= Šipka =

Cave and archaeological site in the Czech Republic

Šipka Cave
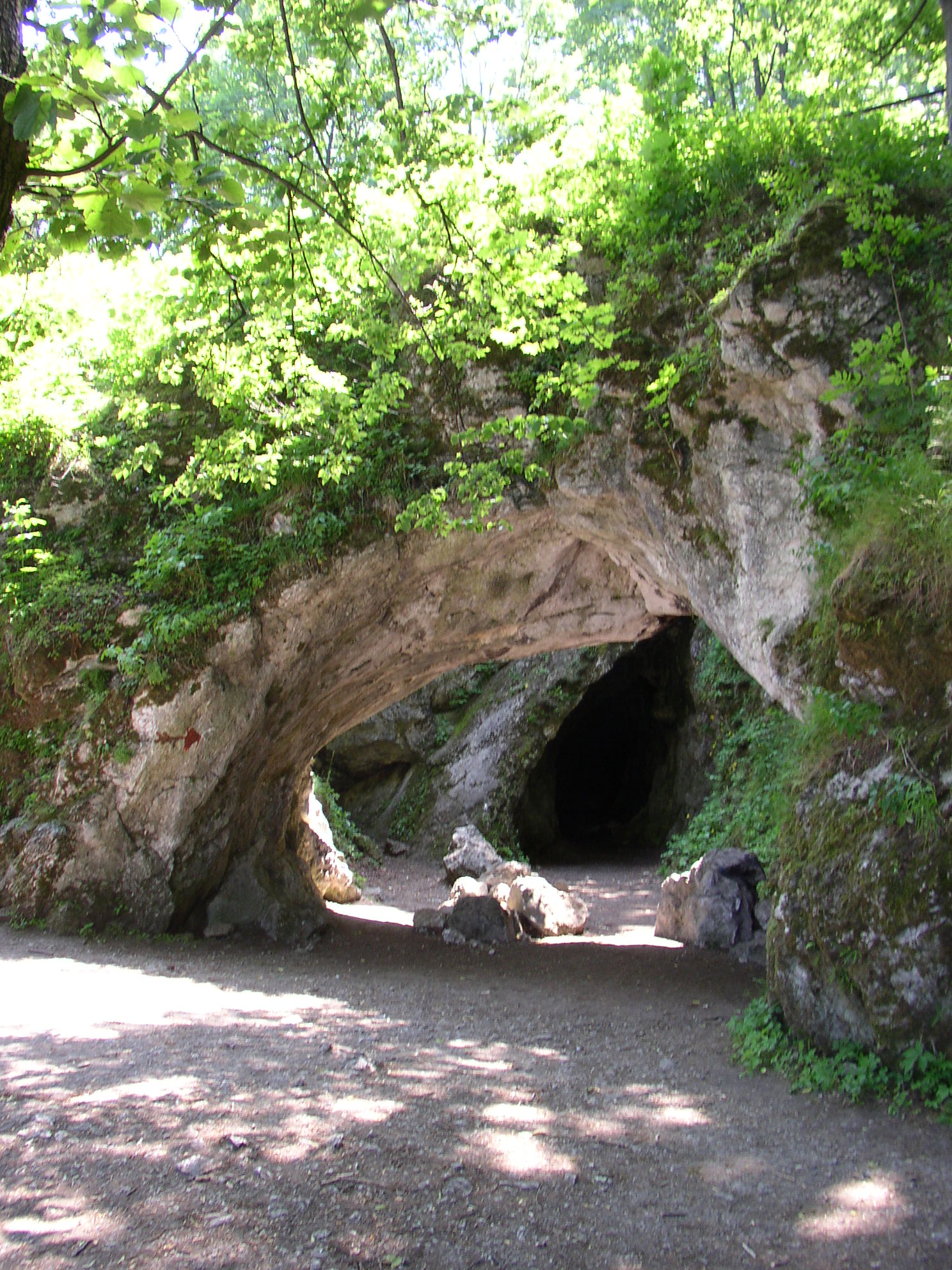
- Šipka Cave

- location in Czech Republic
- 49°35′15″N 18°7′9″E
- Type: limestone karst
- Periods: Paleolithic
- Cultures: Mousterian
- Associated with: Neanderthal
- Location: near Štramberk
- Region: Moravian-Silesian Region, Czech Republic

Site notes
- Excavation dates: 1879 to 1893
- Archaeologists: Karel Jaroslav Maška

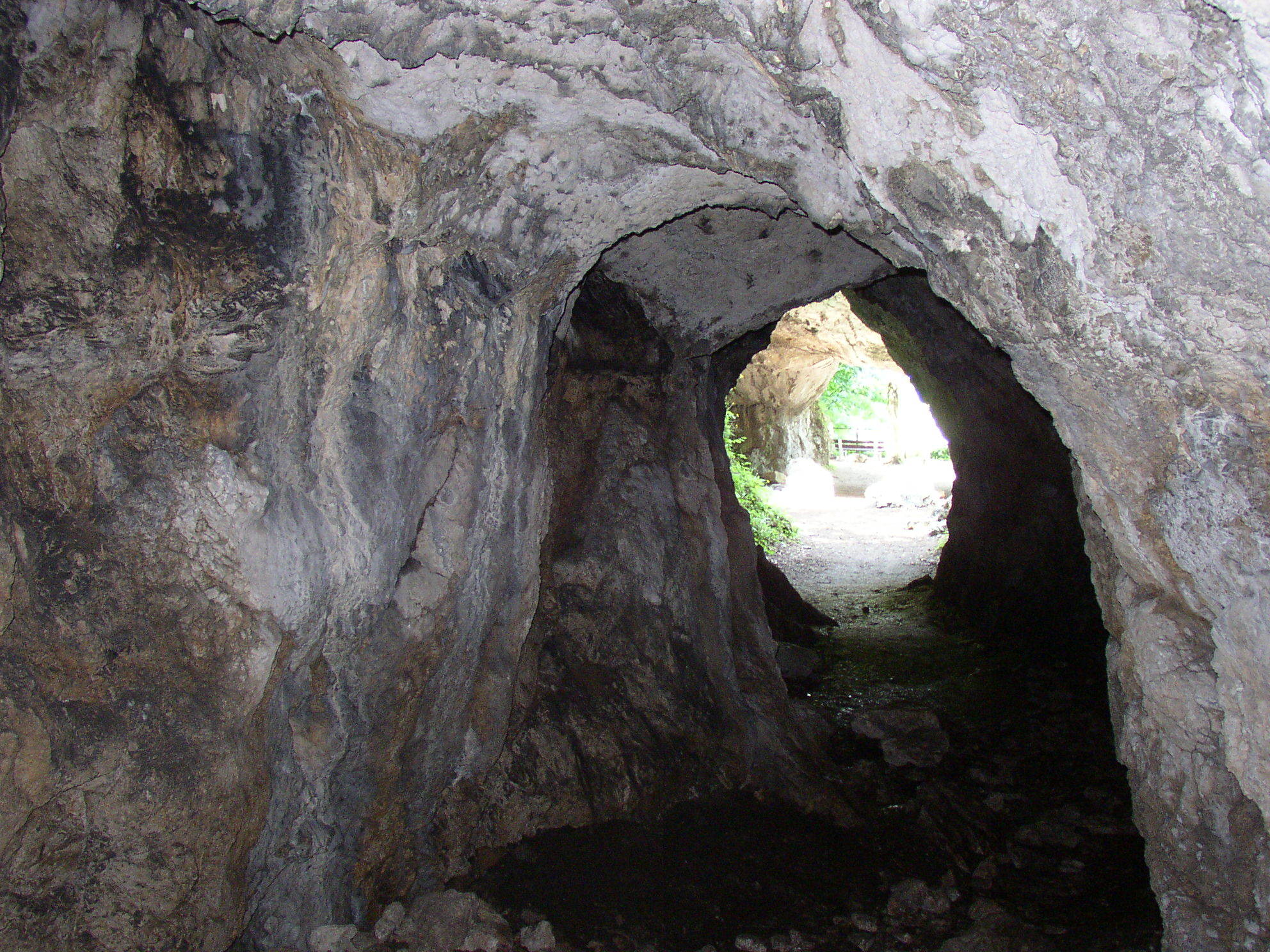
Interior of the cave

Šipka is a cave located near Štramberk, Moravian-Silesian Region, Czech Republic, 440 m above sea level. In 1880, a mandible of a Neanderthal child was found there. The age of the child has been estimated to be between 9 and 10 years.

The archaeological work in Šipka was conducted from 1879 to 1893 by Karel Jaroslav Maška. The cave was probably alternatively inhabited by Neandertals and cave bears. The site also yielded Mousterian tools and traces of hearths. This was the first discovery of Neanderthal remains in their cultural context.
