= Ignaz Schustala =

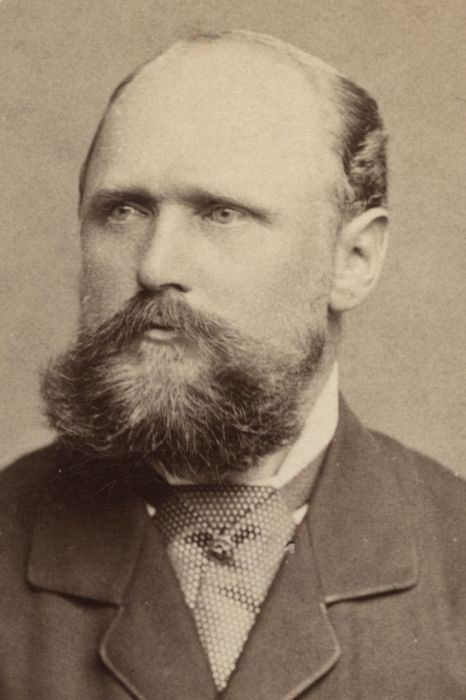
- Born: 7 December 1822; Nesselsdorf, Moravia, Austrian Empire
- Died: 29 January 1891 (aged 68); Vienna, Cisleithania
- Occupation: Entrepreneur
- Known for: Founder of the Nesselsdorfer Wagenbau-Fabriks-Gesellschaft, precursor of Tatra
- Children: Ignaz Schustala the Younger

Ignaz Schustala (Czech: Ignác Šustala) (7 December 1822 – 29 January 1891) was a Czech entrepreneur, and the founder of the Nesselsdorfer Wagenbau-Fabriks-Gesellschaft, which later became Tatra.
