= Štramberk ears =

Czech cone-shaped gingerbread product

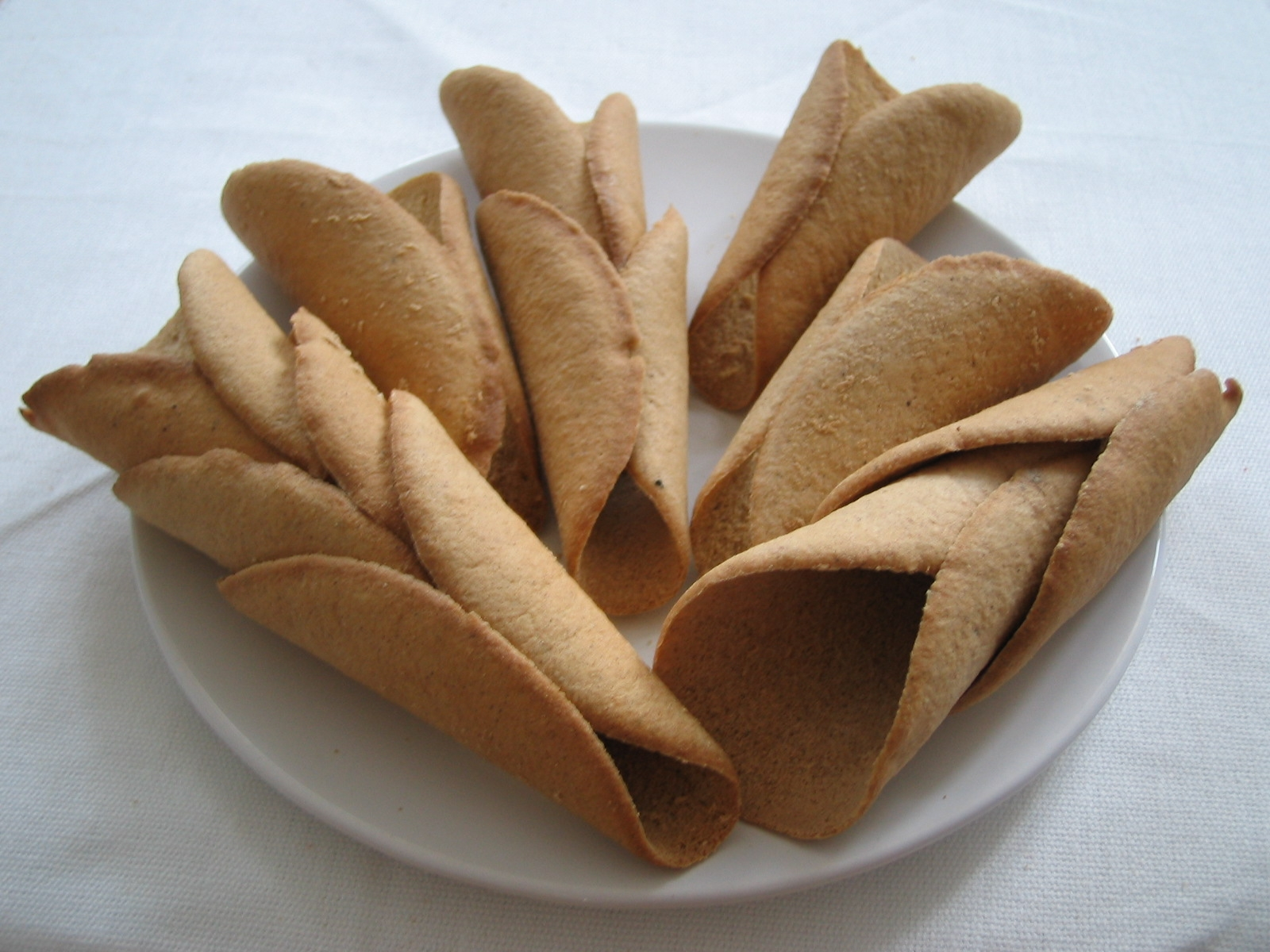
Štramberk ears

Štramberk ears (Czech: Štramberské uši) is a Czech confectionery product made of cone-shaped gingerbread dough traditionally baked in the Štramberk and the surrounding area of Moravia.

== Protected designation of origin ==
This product could be officially made and sold only at the town area since 2000. In 2006, there were six certified producers. In 2007 this sweet became a protected designation of origin in EU as first in the Czech Republic. The product is made in Štramberk for 800 years.

== Legend of the origin ==
According to local legend, in the 13th century, during the Tatar invasion, the inhabitants from the whole area found refuge on Kotouč Mountain, where the Tatars attacked them several times. During the last attack, a storm broke out and flooded the pond above the Tatars' lair, which the local inhabitants took advantage of by digging a dam in the pond and thus flushing out the Tatars.
