= Polom (Přerov District) =

- Municipality
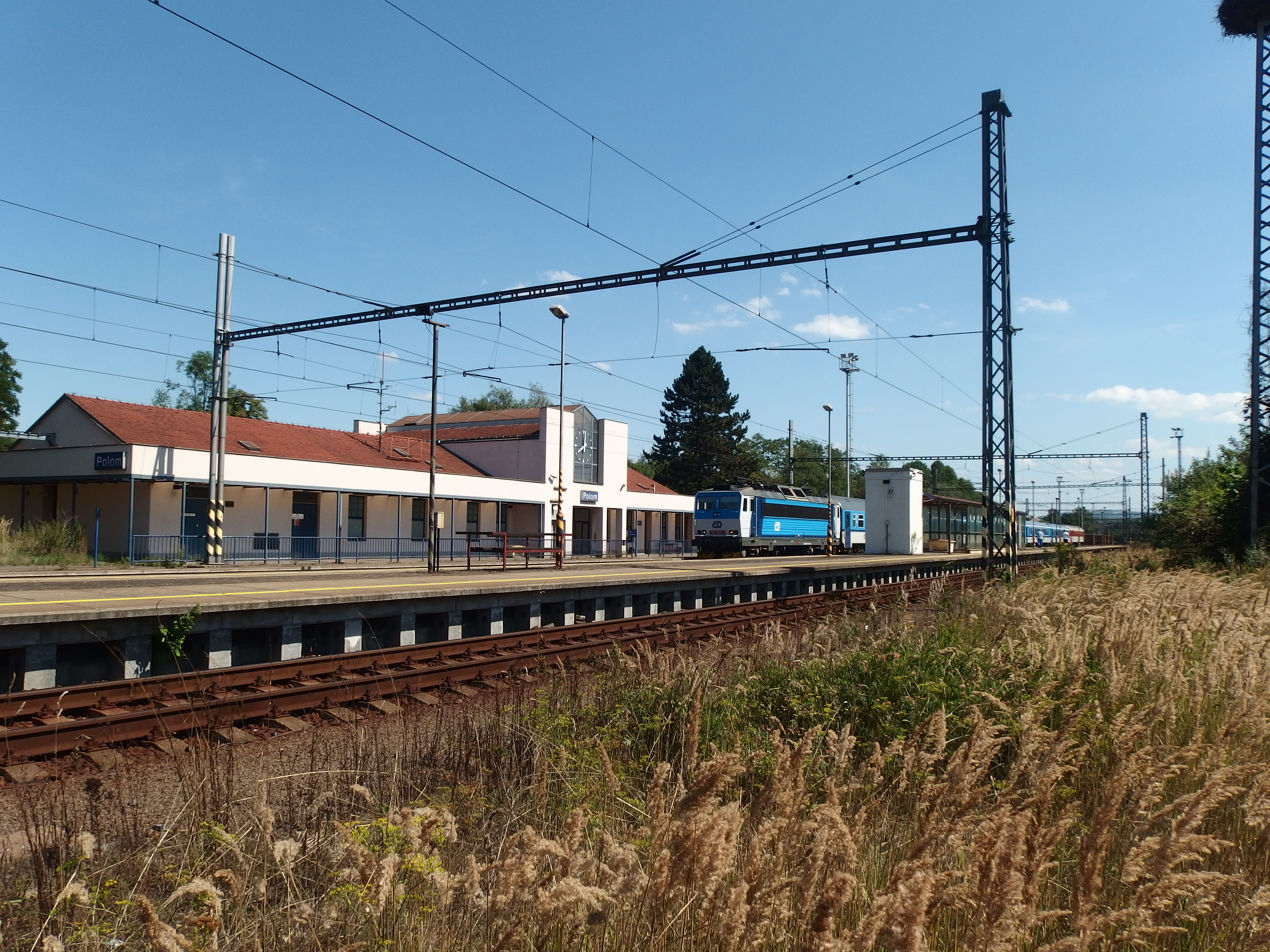
- Train station

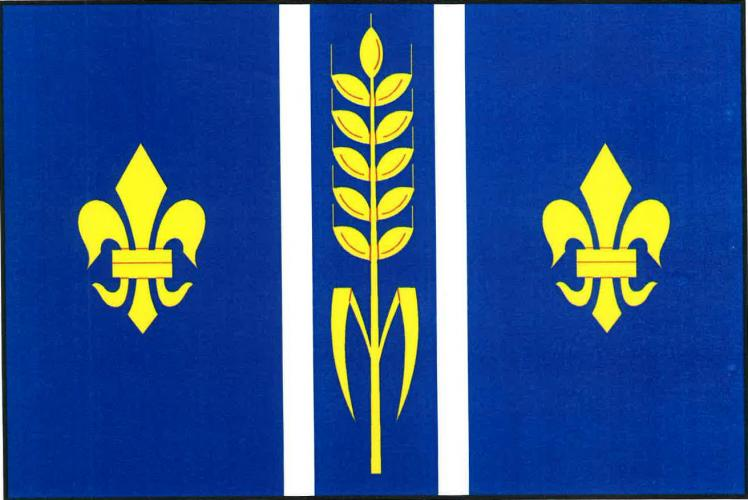
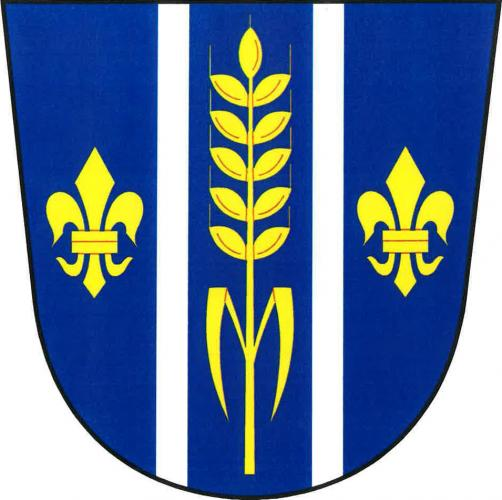
- Flag Coat of arms

- Location in the Czech Republic
- Coordinates: 49°34′29″N 17°50′20″E
- Country: Czech Republic
- Region: Olomouc
- District: Přerov
- First mentioned: 1271

Area
  - Total: 8.24 km^{2} (3.18 sq mi)
- Elevation: 280 m (920 ft)

Population (2026-01-01)
  - Total: 300
  - Density: 36/km^{2} (94/sq mi)
- Time zone: UTC+1 (CET)
  - Summer (DST): UTC+2 (CEST)
- Postal code: 753 65
- Website: www.obecpolom.cz

Polom is a municipality and village in Přerov District in the Olomouc Region of the Czech Republic. It has about 300 inhabitants.

Polom lies approximately 31 kilometres (19 mi) north-east of Přerov, 43 km (27 mi) east of Olomouc, and 253 km (157 mi) east of Prague.

== Demographics ==
Historical population
Year	Pop.	±%
1869	577	—
1880	652	+13.0%
1890	603	−7.5%
1900	635	+5.3%
1910	649	+2.2%
1921	686	+5.7%
1930	717	+4.5%
1950	553	−22.9%
1961	512	−7.4%
1970	431	−15.8%
1980	327	−24.1%
1991	306	−6.4%
2001	289	−5.6%
2011	267	−7.6%
2021	274	+2.6%
Source: Censuses
