= 2008 Studénka train wreck =

Train crash in the Czech Republic

Studénka train accident
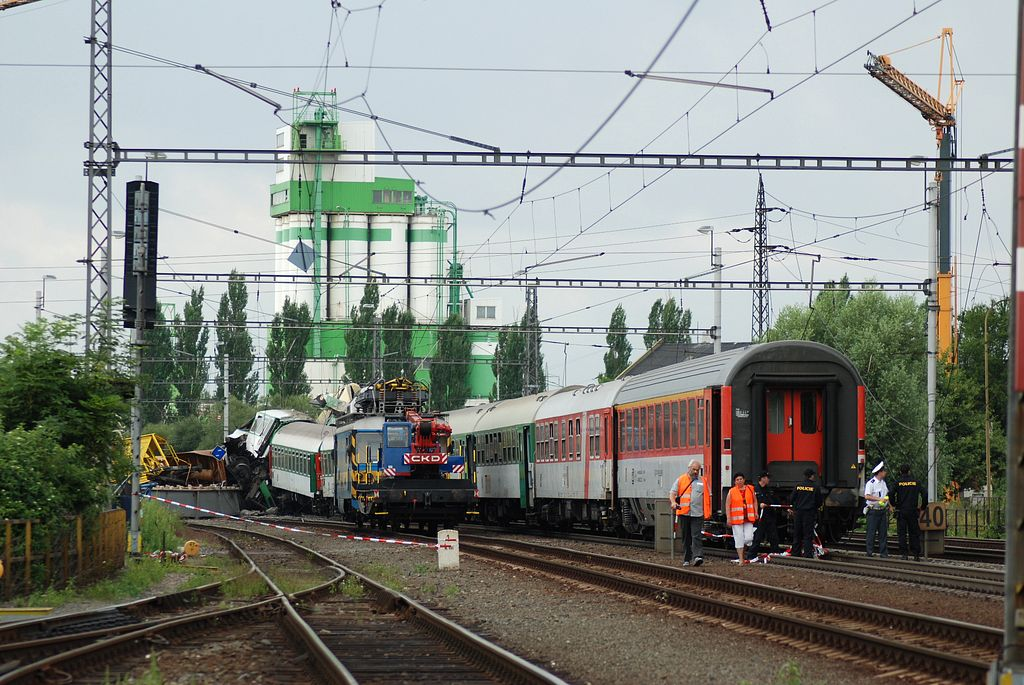

Details
- Date: 8 August 2008; 10:30 (8:30 UTC)
- Location: Studénka
- Coordinates: 49.7049°N 18.0511°E
- Country: Czech Republic
- Line: Česká Třebová – Bohumín (line nr. 270)
- Operator: Czech Railways
- Incident type: Crash into a collapsed bridge

Statistics
- Trains: EC 108 Comenius (Kraków – Prague)
- Passengers: approx. 400
- Deaths: 8
- Injured: 64
- Damage: 136 million CZK
Route map
Accident location in the Czech Republic

On 8 August 2008, at approximately 10:30 local time (8:30 UTC), EuroCity train EC 108 Comenius, en route from Kraków, Poland, to Prague, Czech Republic, struck a part of a motorway bridge that had fallen onto the railroad track near the Studénka railway station in the Czech Republic. The train derailed, killing eight people and injuring 64.

== Crash ==
The motorway bridge near Studénka railroad station was undergoing repairs at the time of the incident. On 8 August the workers were putting a beam to span between the two supports on the sides of the railroad track. Parts of the beam fell onto the track when the train was 452 metres (1,483 ft) away, approaching the bridge at around 135 km/h (84 mph). The driver noticed the iron bridge structure swaying and immediately engaged the emergency brake and escaped from the control cab to the engine room, which is better protected against impact. This behaviour was later recognized by the Czech Railways inspectors as exactly what drivers should do in this kind of situation. It was said that there is a very high probability that this conduct saved his life.

The train struck the obstacle within a few seconds, by which time the train had slowed down to 90 km/h (56 mph). The locomotive and four carriages derailed after the impact; the carriage coupled directly behind the locomotive sustained the most damage. Six other carriages, among them the restaurant carriage, remained on the track. Three freight vans on another track were also derailed. At the time of the accident, there were approximately 400 people on board the train, 105 of them of Polish nationality. There was also a group of people travelling to an Iron Maiden concert in Prague.

== Rescue operation ==
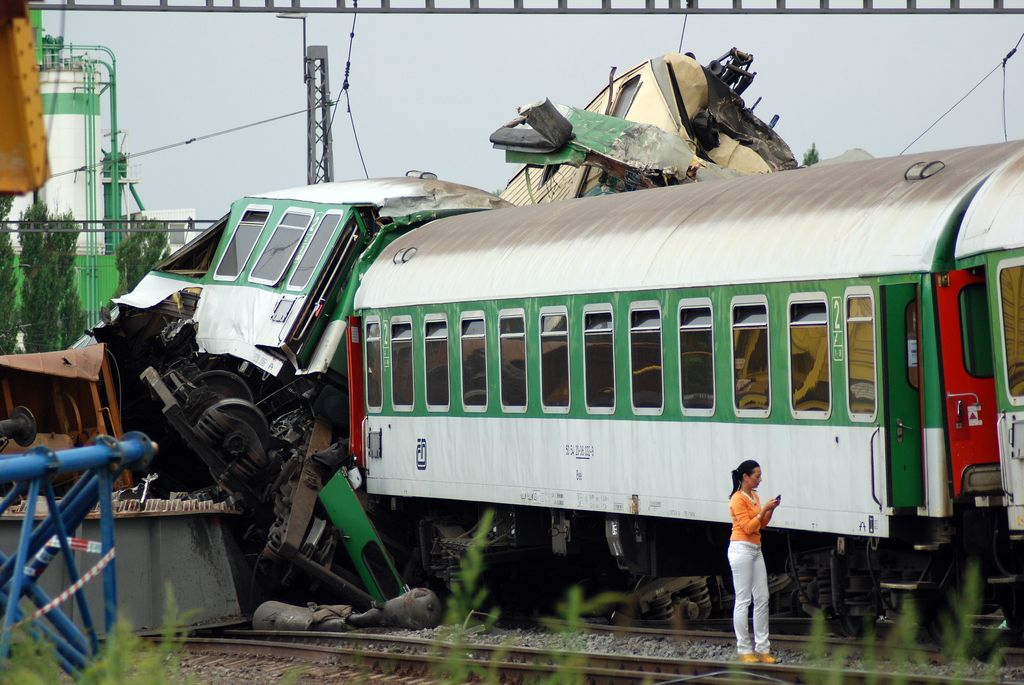

Since the crash happened during the day and there were people present in the proximity of the track, the rescue units were notified about the situation almost instantly. The first rescue unit, which consisted of firefighters stationed in Studénka, arrived at the site seven minutes after the alarm was issued. There were a total of 20 firefighter rescue units (altogether 100 firefighters and 40 firefighter engines) rescuing the passengers. Twenty ambulances together with helicopters transported the injured into all the nearest hospitals in Ostrava, Nový Jičín, Frýdek-Místek, Opava, Bílovec, Olomouc and Valašské Meziříčí. Thanks to cooperation within the Integrated rescue system (Integrovaný záchranný systém), all the injured were in the hospitals within two hours of the accident. Polish authorities offered help with the rescue operation immediately when notified about the disaster, but the offer was not accepted as Czech rescue services did not consider it necessary.

== Criticism ==
Immediately after the crash there was a great public uproar about finding the culprits. The first accused was the Czech Railways company for letting trains travel at relatively high speeds in the construction area. However, the Czech Railways spokesman stated that the building company had not notified the Czech Railways about the ongoing reconstruction of the bridge. The building company Dopravní stavby Ostrava was also accused of being responsible for the accident. The spokesman for the company stated that the causes of the falling bridge parts onto the track were being investigated and that all the compulsory notifications to the Czech Railways about the reconstruction of the bridge had definitely been issued.

== Aftermath ==
Two Czech men, three Czech women and a Polish woman were killed in the crash, while the seventh victim, a young Ukrainian man, died later in hospital. The eighth fatality, a 21-year-old Polish woman, died two months after the disaster on 26 September.

The cost of the damage was estimated at 136 million CZK (5.6 million Euros, 8.4 million US dollars), according to a Czech Rail Safety Inspection Office announcement. The Czech Railways company promised to pay compensation to everyone injured as well as to the families of the dead. The amount of money paid would then vary depending on individual circumstances of every case.

The legal question of responsibility for the train crash spent 11 years in the Czech courts of law. In September 2022, a final decision was made and five employees of construction companies received suspended sentences. Five other defendants had already been acquitted.

== See also ==
- 2015 Studénka train crash
