= Štramberk =

Town in Moravian-Silesian Region, Czech Republic

- Town
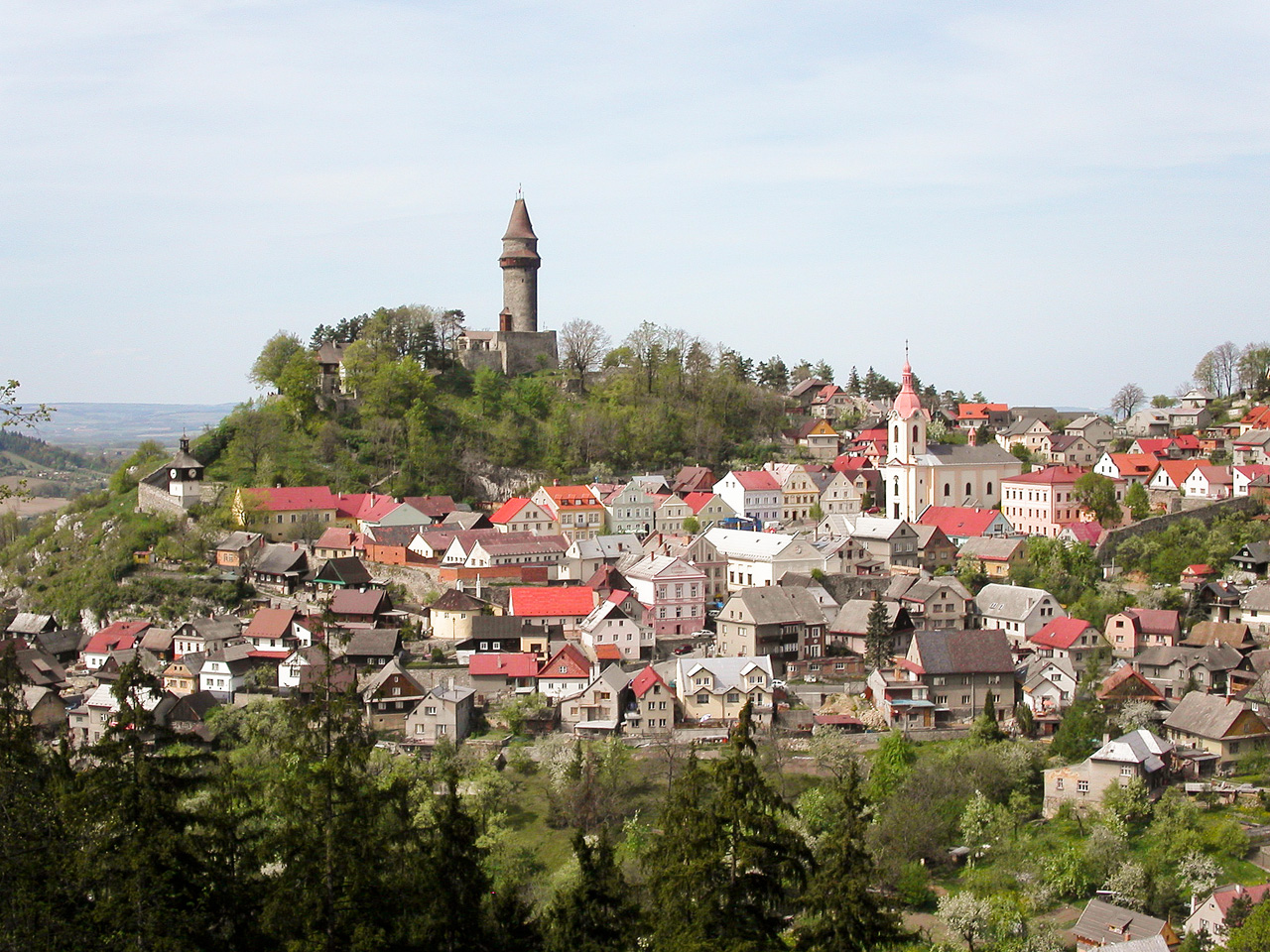
- General view of the town from Šipka Cave

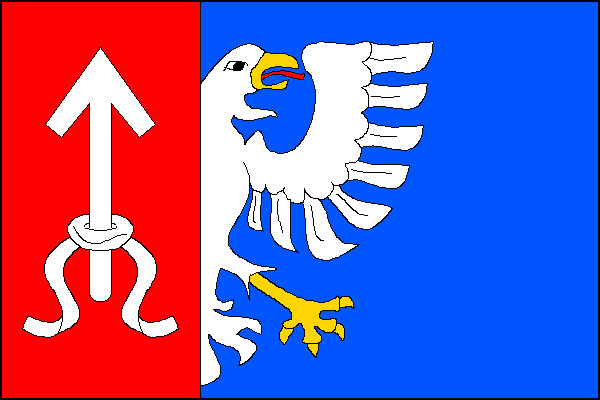
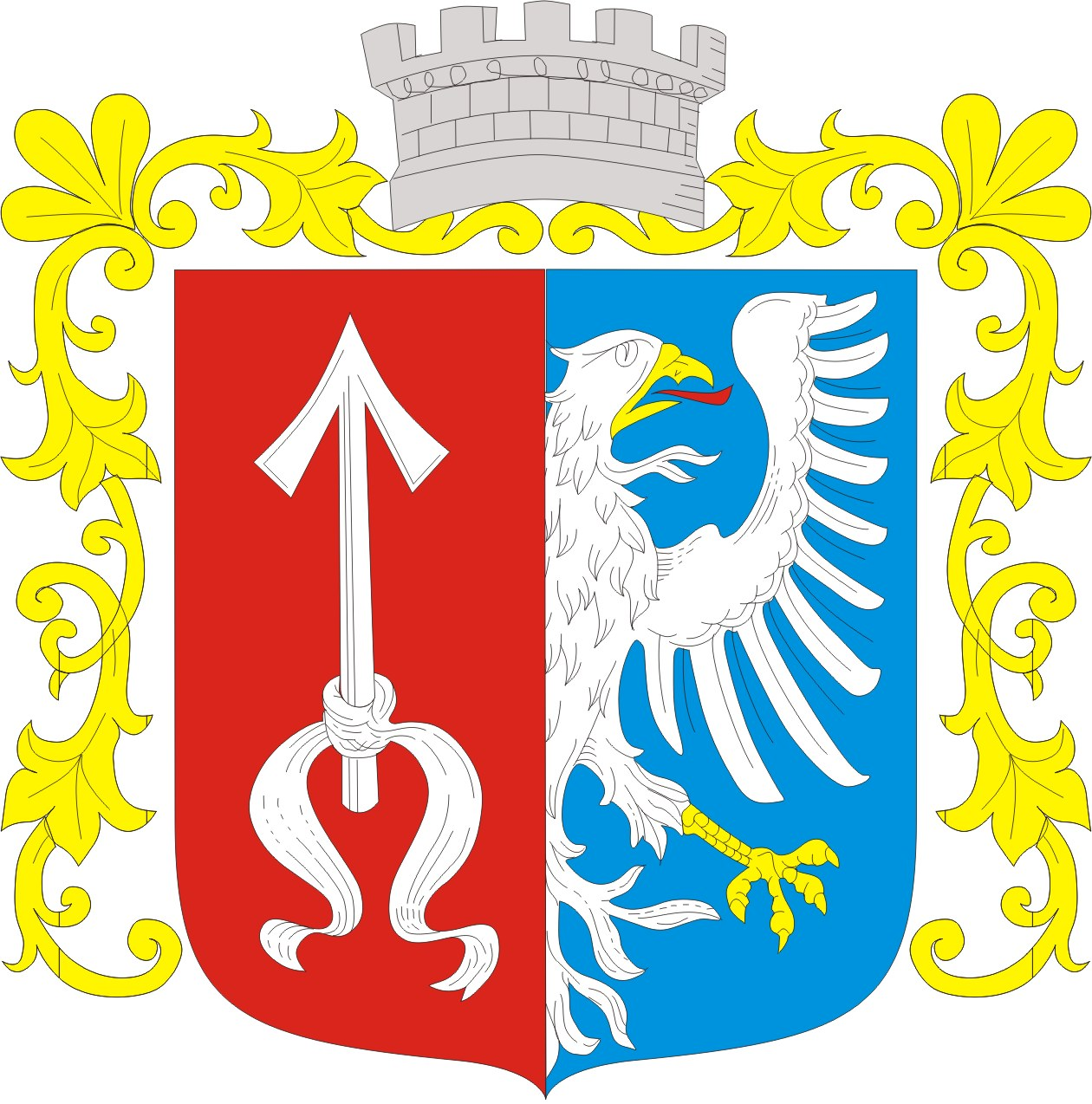
- Flag Coat of arms

- Location in the Czech Republic
- Coordinates: 49°35′30″N 18°7′3″E
- Country: Czech Republic
- Region: Moravian-Silesian
- District: Nový Jičín
- First mentioned: 1211

Government
  - Mayor: David Plandor

Area
  - Total: 9.33 km^{2} (3.60 sq mi)
- Elevation: 415 m (1,362 ft)

Population (2026-01-01)
  - Total: 3,478
  - Density: 373/km^{2} (965/sq mi)
- Time zone: UTC+1 (CET)
  - Summer (DST): UTC+2 (CEST)
- Postal code: 742 66
- Website: www.stramberk.cz

Štramberk (Czech pronunciation: [ˈʃtrambɛrk]; German: Stramberg) is a town in Nový Jičín District in the Moravian-Silesian Region of the Czech Republic. It has about 3,500 inhabitants. The town is located in the Moravian-Silesian Foothills.

Štramberk is known for the production of Štramberk ears, a traditional confectionery. The historic centre of Štramberk is well preserved and is protected as an urban monument reservation. The main landmarks of the town are the Trúba tower and the Church of Saint John of Nepomuk.

== Geography ==
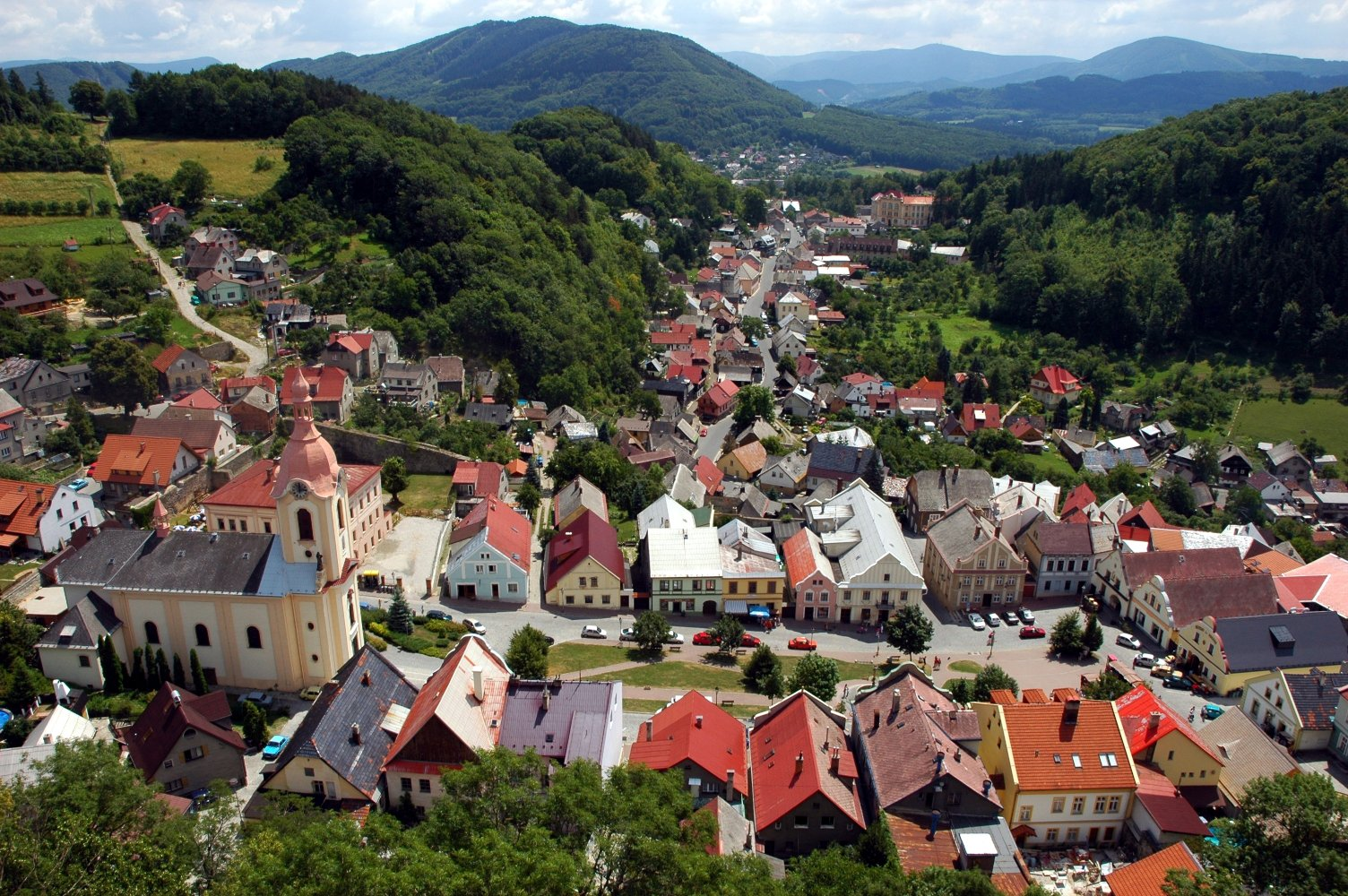
View of Štramberk from the castle, the town square in the foreground

Štramberk is located about 7 kilometres (4 mi) east of Nový Jičín and 25 km (16 mi) southwest of Ostrava. It lies in the Moravian-Silesian Foothills. The town is spread on the steep slopes of several hills. The highest point is the hill Bílá hora at 557 m (1,827 ft) above sea level. The Sedlnice Stream flows through the western part of Štramberk's territory.

The town is surrounded by several small-scale protected areas, including the Šipka Cave National Nature Monument. This karst cave is the oldest recorded human presence in the territory of the Czech Republic.

== History ==
The first written mention of Štramberk is from 1211, when a village under the eponymous castle was documented. The origin and age of the castle are unknown. In 1359, the town of Štramberk was founded by the Moravian margrave John Henry on the site of the village. It obtained various privileges that helped its development.

From the 15th century, Štramberk was the centre of Moravian Church. In 1624, Štramberk was acquired by the Jesuits. During the Thirty Years' War, the town was attacked and devastated several times. The castle was severely damaged. In the 1783, the front part collapsed and the masonry was dismantled.

In the second half of the 19th century limestone mining began here, which started further economic growth. The railway was opened in 1881. Although Štramberk was completely Czech in terms of nationality, it was annexed by Nazi Germany as part of the Munich Agreement from 1938 to 1945.

== Demographics ==
Historical population

Year	Pop.	±%
1869	2,352	—
1880	2,282	−3.0%
1890	2,663	+16.7%
1900	3,052	+14.6%
1910	3,366	+10.3%

Year	Pop.	±%
1921	3,348	−0.5%
1930	3,591	+7.3%
1950	3,373	−6.1%
1961	4,028	+19.4%
1970	4,191	+4.0%

Year	Pop.	±%
1980	3,713	−11.4%
1991	3,280	−11.7%
2001	3,408	+3.9%
2011	3,329	−2.3%
2021	3,341	+0.4%

Source: Censuses

== Economy ==
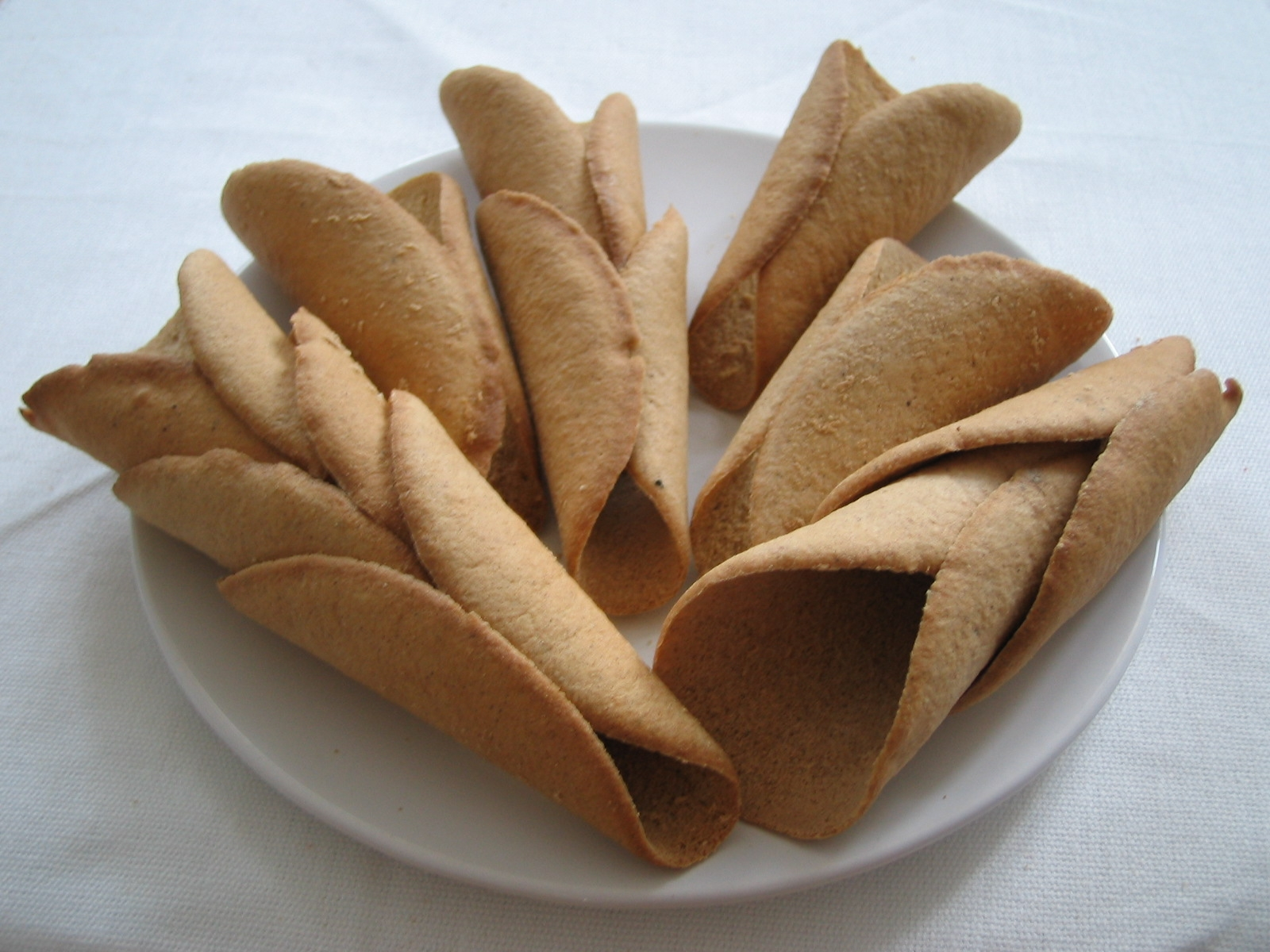
Štramberk ears

The town is known for the production of Štramberk ears, which is a traditional confectionery produced for about 800 years. The manufactory is protected geographical indication by the European Union and it was the first Czech product with this designation.

== Transport ==
Štramberk is located on the railway line Studénka–Veřovice.

== Sport ==
Every year, the town hosts the finish of the first stage of the cycling race Gracia–Orlová.

The town is home to the association football club FK Štramberk. It plays in lower amateur tiers. It was founded in 1932 as Sokol kopané Štramberk.

== Sights ==
Trúba and the bell tower

The main landmark of Štramberk is a remnant of the Štramberk Castle, a cylindrical tower called Trúba. It was repaired in 1903–1904 and adapted to an observation tower. The town fortifications have been partially preserved and delimit the original town limits. From the Gothic Church of Saint Bartholomew, which stood under the castle, only a prismatic brick bell tower with a wooden gallery has been preserved.

In the historic centre of Štramberk is a unique collection of timbered houses from the 18th and 19th centuries. The main landmark of the town square is the Church of Saint John of Nepomuk. This Baroque parish church was founded in 1721 and was decorated by Jano Köhler in the early 20th century.

The Šipka Cave is freely accessible. On the hill Bílá hora is a 43 metres (141 ft) high observation tower in the shape of a double helix.

== Notable people ==
- Martin Stephan (1777–1846), pastor of St. John Lutheran Church in Dresden
- Zdeněk Burian (1905–1981), painter; lived here in 1905–1909
- Jiří Hanzelka (1920–2003), traveller and writer
