= Studénka =

- Town
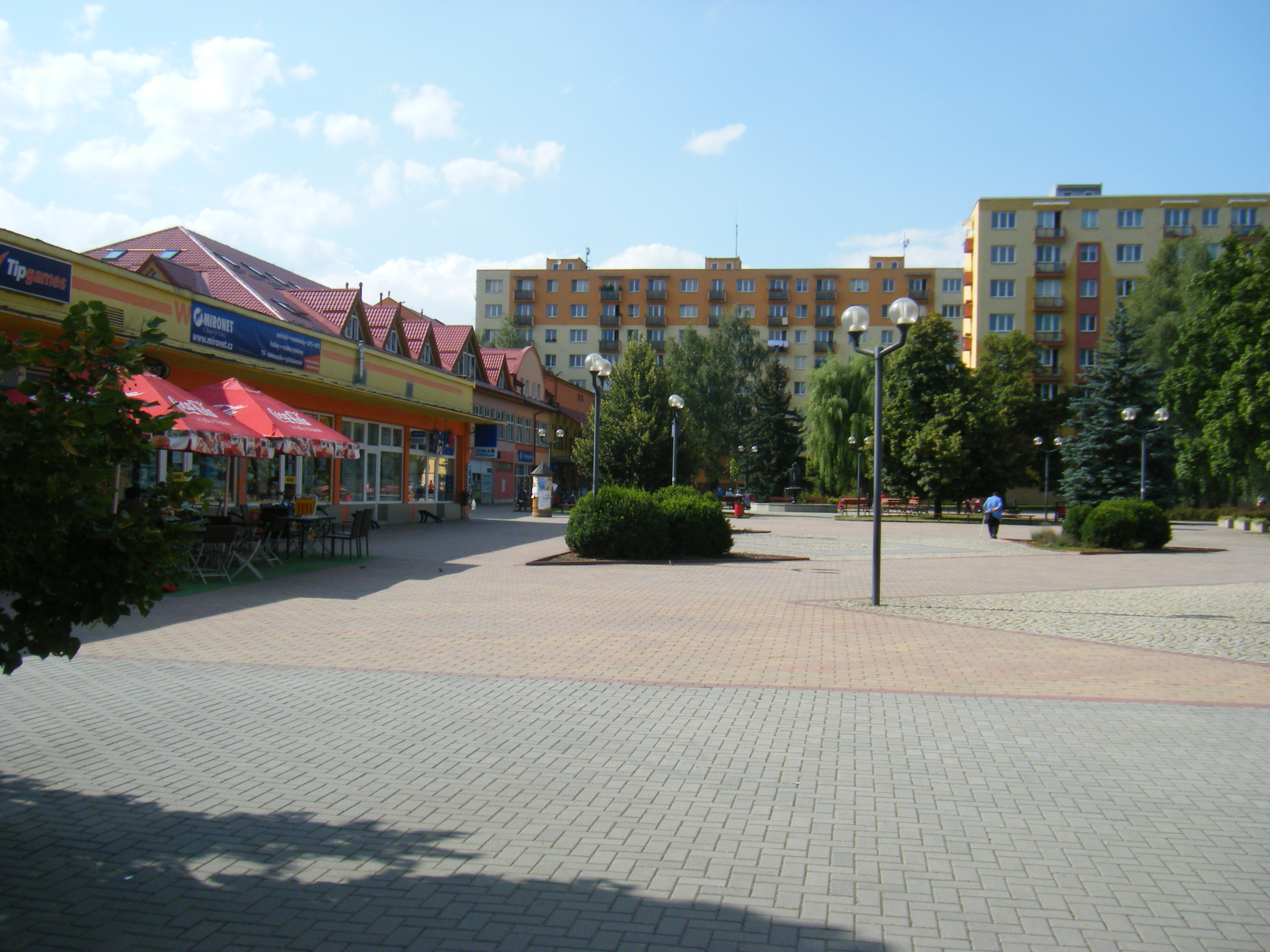
- Main square

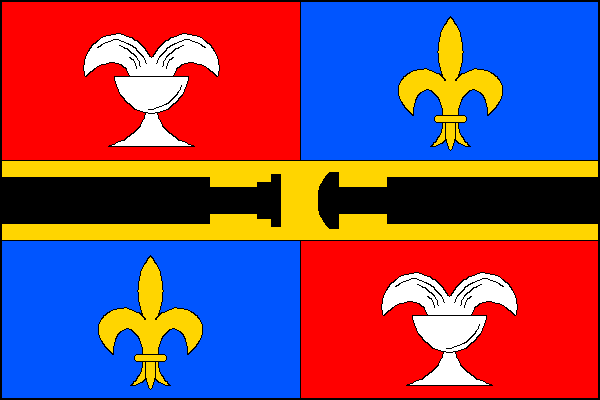
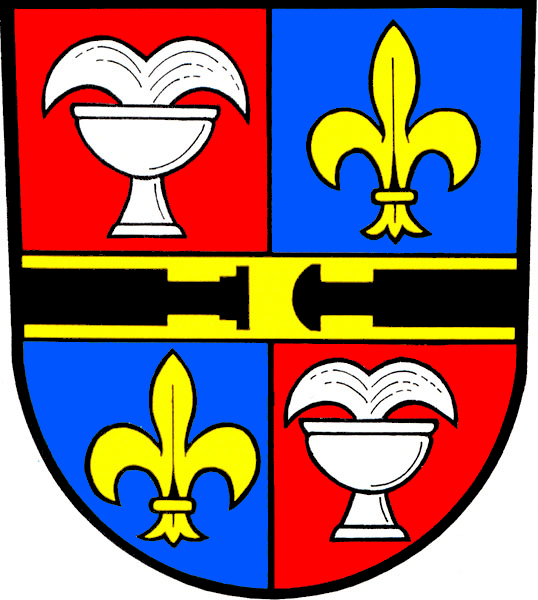
- Flag Coat of arms

- Location in the Czech Republic
- Coordinates: 49°43′24″N 18°4′43″E
- Country: Czech Republic
- Region: Moravian-Silesian
- District: Nový Jičín
- First mentioned: 1436

Government
  - Mayor: Libor Slavík

Area
  - Total: 30.92 km^{2} (11.94 sq mi)
- Elevation: 239 m (784 ft)

Population (2026-01-01)
  - Total: 9,166
  - Density: 296.4/km^{2} (767.8/sq mi)
- Time zone: UTC+1 (CET)
  - Summer (DST): UTC+2 (CEST)
- Postal code: 742 13
- Website: www.mesto-studenka.cz

Studénka (Czech pronunciation: [ˈstudɛːŋka]; German: Stauding) is a town in Nový Jičín District in the Moravian-Silesian Region of the Czech Republic. It has about 9,200 inhabitants. The town is located on the Oder River in the Moravian Gate lowland, on both sides of the historical border between Moravia and Czech Silesia.

Studénka was founded in the 15th century at the latest and was promoted to a town in 1959, after it merged with Butovice. The main landmarks are the Studénka Castle and the Church of Saint Bartholomew.

== Administrative division ==
Studénka consists of three municipal parts (in brackets population according to the 2021 census):

- Studénka (2,942)
- Butovice (5,837)
- Nová Horka (202)

== Geography ==
Studénka is located about 13 kilometres (8 mi) northeast of Nový Jičín and 17 km (11 mi) southwest of Ostrava. It is situated on both sides of the historical border between Moravia and Czech Silesia; Butovice and Nová Horka lies in Moravia and the town proper in Czech Silesia.

Studénka lies in a flat landscape in the Moravian Gate. It is situated on the left bank of the Oder River. Two systems of fishponds are located in the municipal territory. The southeastern part of the territory, which is a strip along the Oder, belongs to the Poodří Protected Landscape Area.

== History ==
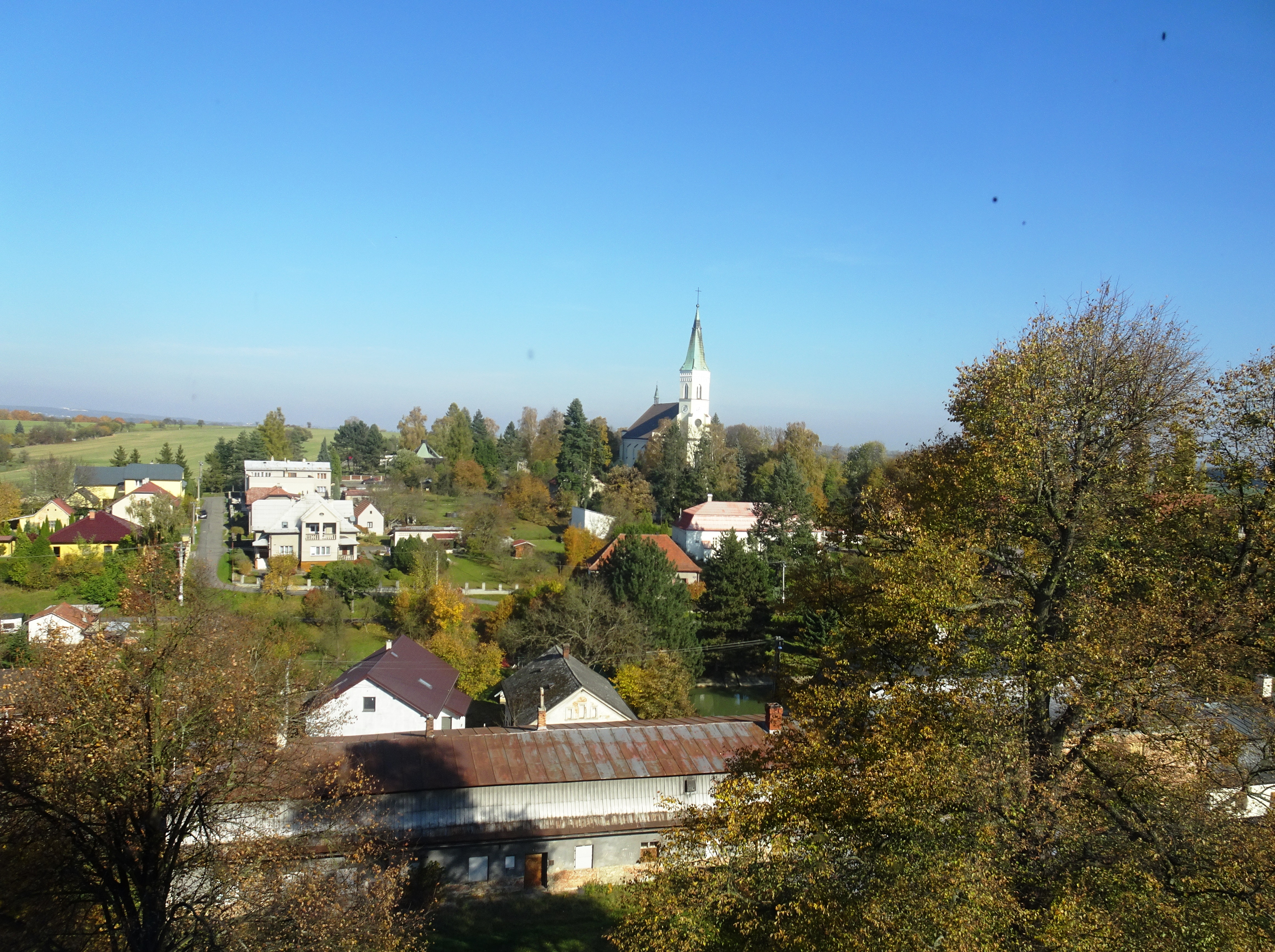
View from the castle with the Church of Saint Bartholomew

The first written mention of Studénka is from 1436. The village of Butovice was first mentioned in 1324 and Nová Horka in 1374. For centuries, Studénka was an agricultural village, and its population was Czech; Butovice was focused on cattle breeding and pond farming and had a predominantly German population.

In 1467–1569, Studénka was owned by the Lords of Fulštejn, then it was owned by the Pražma of Bílkov family, who annexed it to the Bílovec estate. After the Bohemian Revolt, the properties of the family were confiscated, and in 1634 the village was acquired by Václav of Vrbno, who annexed it to the Fulnek estate. In the 18th century, Studénka was bought by the Mönnich family, and in the 19th century it was inherited by the Wahlstatt family.

In 1881 and 1890, the railway lines Studénka–Štramberk and Studénka–Bílovec were opened, and in 1900, a factory for the production of railway cars was established. The factory became the main employer in the region and contributed to the development of the village.

In 1959, the until then independent municipality of Butovice was merged with Studénka and Studénka obtained the status of a town.

== Demographics ==
Historical population

Year	Pop.	±%
1869	3,817	—
1880	3,971	+4.0%
1890	4,264	+7.4%
1900	4,889	+14.7%
1910	5,946	+21.6%

Year	Pop.	±%
1921	6,673	+12.2%
1930	7,105	+6.5%
1950	5,685	−20.0%
1961	7,627	+34.2%
1970	10,173	+33.4%

Year	Pop.	±%
1980	10,790	+6.1%
1991	10,736	−0.5%
2001	10,505	−2.2%
2011	9,594	−8.7%
2021	8,981	−6.4%

Source: Censuses

== Economy ==
The traditional production of railway cars ended in 2006 and the Vagónka Studénka company was restructuralised. Since 2006, the factory has been a manufacturer of metal products known as MSV Metal Studénka.

== Transport ==
The D1 motorway (the section from Přerov to Ostrava) bypasses the town in the north.

Studénka is located on the international railway line Prague–Kraków and on the lines Brno–Bohumín, Ostrava–Veřovice and Studénka–Bílovec. Studénka was the scene of the 2008 Studénka train wreck and the 2015 Studénka train crash.

== Sport ==
SK Studénka is a Czech handball club which plays in the top tier. The football club MSV Studénka and the ice hockey club HC Studénka play in the lower amateur tiers.

== Sights ==
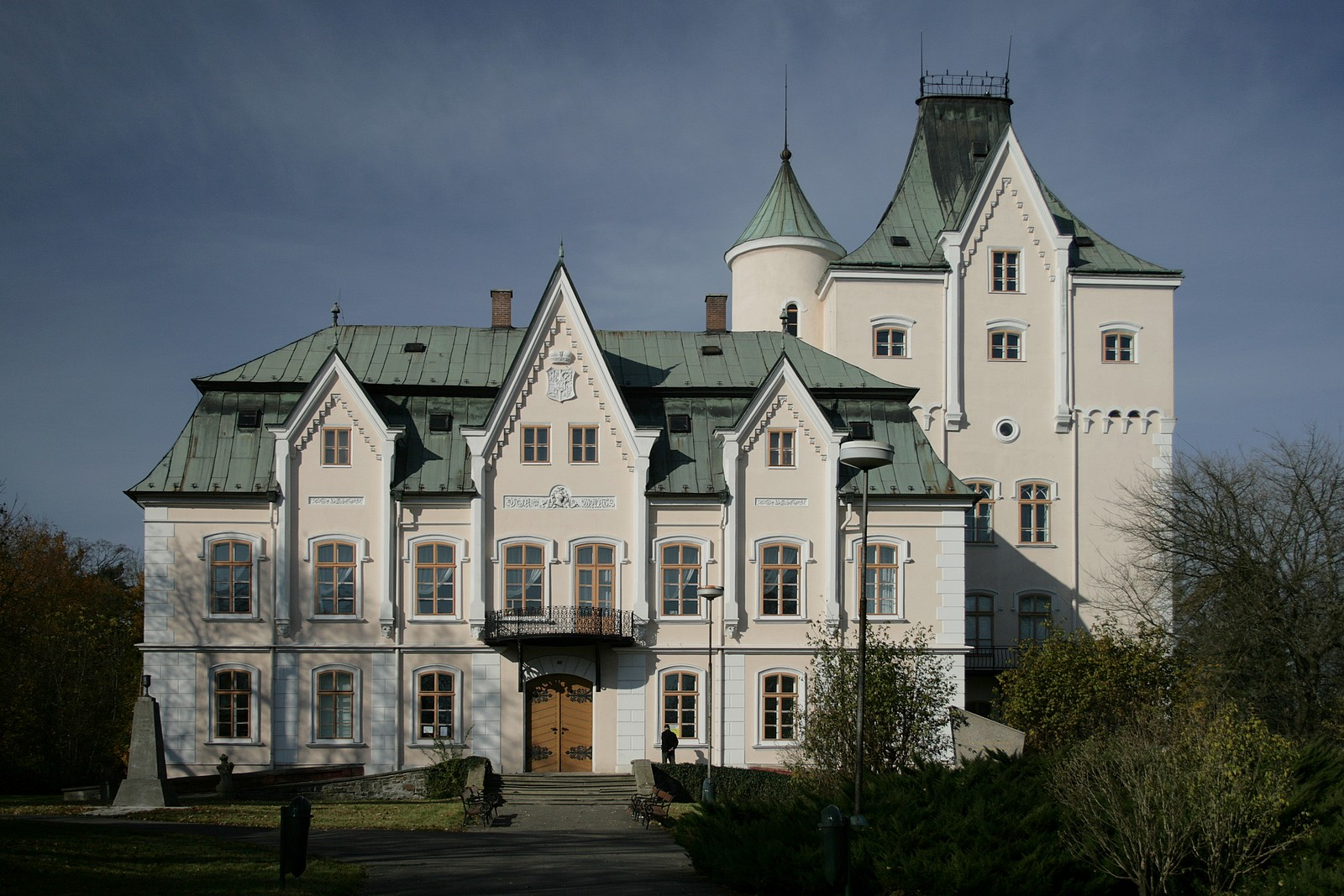
New Castle

The Studénka Castle is formed by two Baroque buildings, known as Old Castle and New Castle. The Old Castle was built in 1705 and the New Castle in 1750. A tower was added to the Old Castle in 1860–1863. Today the castle complex is used for cultural and commercial purposes and houses a ceremonial hall, a library, a primary art school, and the Railway Cars Museum.

The most valuable sacral building is the Church of Saint Bartholomew. This parish church was built in neo-Gothic style in 1880 on the site of an old wooden church from the early 16th century.

== Notable people ==
- Hugo Gorge (1883–1934), Austrian architect
- Augustin Novák (1890–1970), Czech war pilot
- František Tomášek (1899–1992), archbishop of Prague
- Martin Adamský (born 1981), ice hockey player
- Vladimír Svačina (born 1987), ice hockey player

== Twin towns – sister cities ==
Studénka is twinned with:

- Dąbrowa Górnicza, Poland
