= Veřovice =

- Municipality
- Municipal office

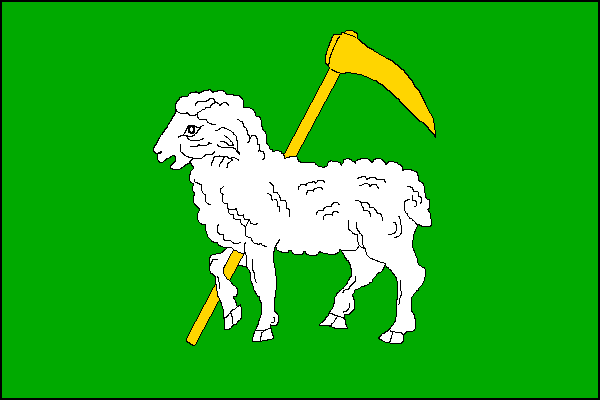
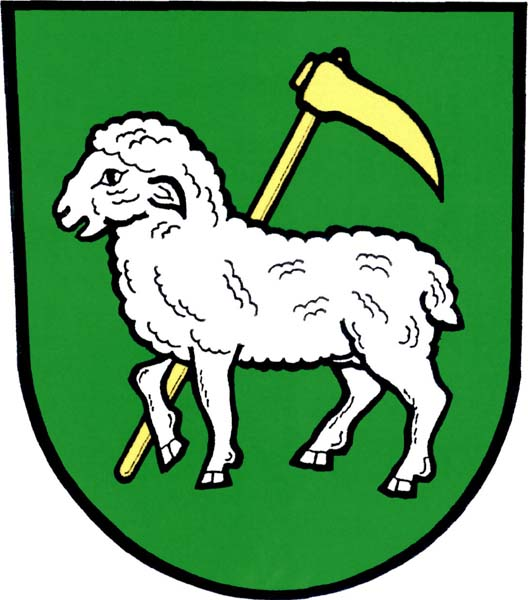
- Flag Coat of arms

- Location in the Czech Republic
- Coordinates: 49°32′21″N 18°6′51″E
- Country: Czech Republic
- Region: Moravian-Silesian
- District: Nový Jičín
- First mentioned: 1411

Area
  - Total: 16.59 km^{2} (6.41 sq mi)
- Elevation: 422 m (1,385 ft)

Population (2026-01-01)
  - Total: 2,009
  - Density: 121.1/km^{2} (313.6/sq mi)
- Time zone: UTC+1 (CET)
  - Summer (DST): UTC+2 (CEST)
- Postal code: 742 73
- Website: www.verovice.cz

Veřovice (German: Wernsdorf) is a municipality and village in Nový Jičín District in the Moravian-Silesian Region of the Czech Republic. It has about 2,000 inhabitants.

== Etymology ==
The German name Wernsdorf is derived from a lokator named Werner, who founded the village. The Czech name Veřovice is a transcription of the German name.

== Geography ==
Veřovice is located about 9 kilometres (6 mi) southeast of Nový Jičín and 32 km (20 mi) south of Ostrava. The northern part of the municipality lies in the Moravian-Silesian Foothills. The southern part lies in the Moravian-Silesian Beskids and within the Beskydy Protected Landscape Area. The highest point is the Velký Javorník mountain at 918 m (3,012 ft) above sea level, which lies on the southeastern municipal border. The Jičínka River flows through the municipality.

== History ==
The first written mention of Veřovice is from 1411, however there is also an unverified mention from 1293. The village was probably founded in the second half of the 13th century, during the colonisation of the area.

== Demographics ==
Historical population

Year	Pop.	±%
1869	1,349	—
1880	1,366	+1.3%
1890	1,448	+6.0%
1900	1,574	+8.7%
1910	1,606	+2.0%

Year	Pop.	±%
1921	1,555	−3.2%
1930	1,650	+6.1%
1950	1,643	−0.4%
1961	1,848	+12.5%
1970	1,949	+5.5%

Year	Pop.	±%
1980	1,872	−4.0%
1991	1,874	+0.1%
2001	1,942	+3.6%
2011	1,953	+0.6%
2021	1,914	−2.0%

Source: Censuses

== Transport ==
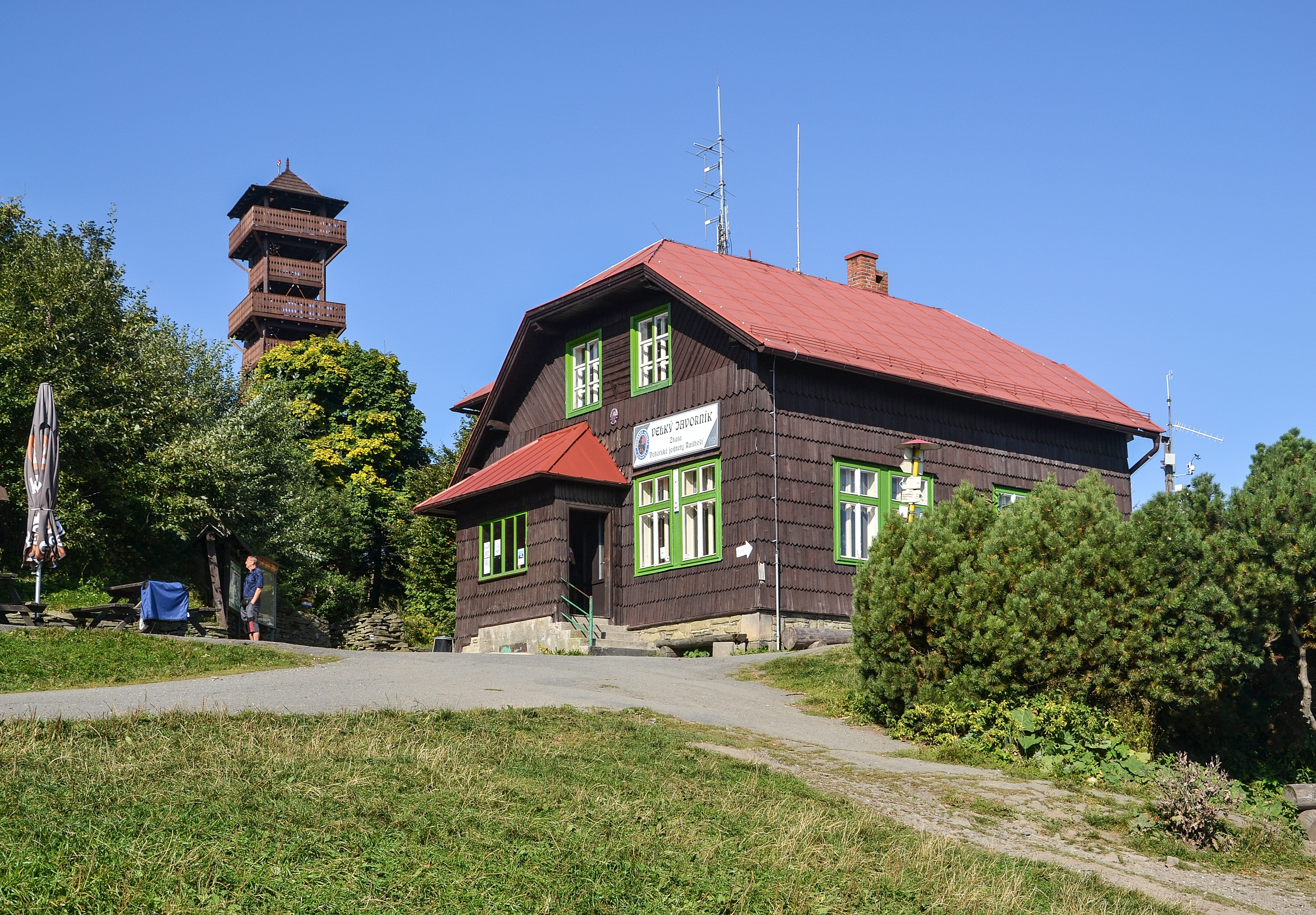
Observation tower and restaurant on Velký Javorník

Veřovice is located on the railway lines Valašské Meziříčí–Frýdlant nad Ostravicí and Studénka–Veřovice.

== Sights ==
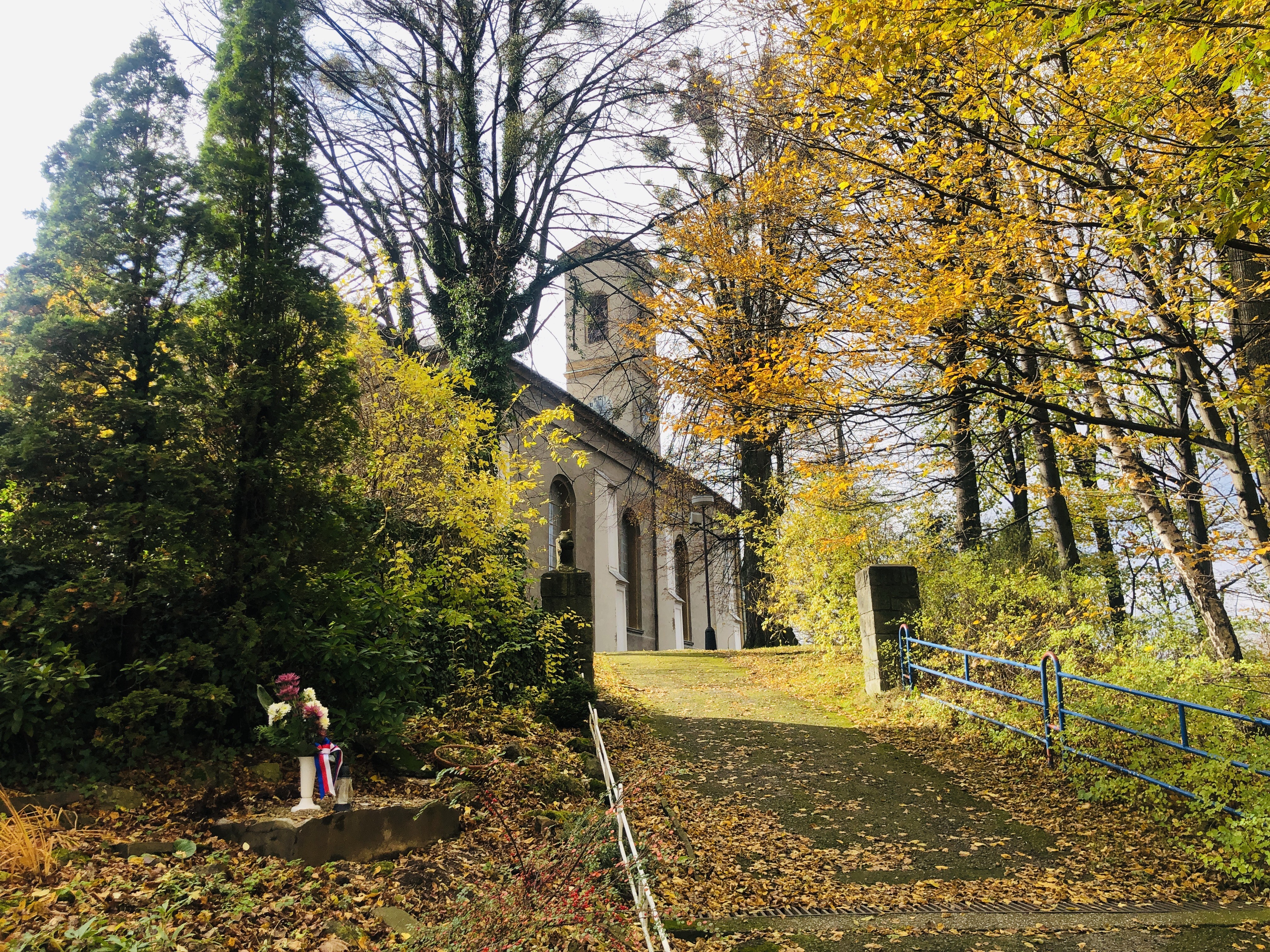
Church of the Assumption of the Virgin Mary

The Velký Javorník mountain is one of the most visited tourist destinations in the Moravian-Silesian Beskids. There is a 26 m (85 ft)-high wooden observation tower, a restaurant built in 1935, and a paragliding ramp.

The Church of the Assumption of the Virgin Mary dates from 1854. It replaced an old wooden church.

== Twin towns – sister cities ==
Veřovice is twinned with:

- Hendungen, Germany
- Lampertswalde, Germany
