= Moravian-Silesian Region =

Region of the Czech Republic

Moravian-Silesian Region Moravskoslezský kraj
- Region
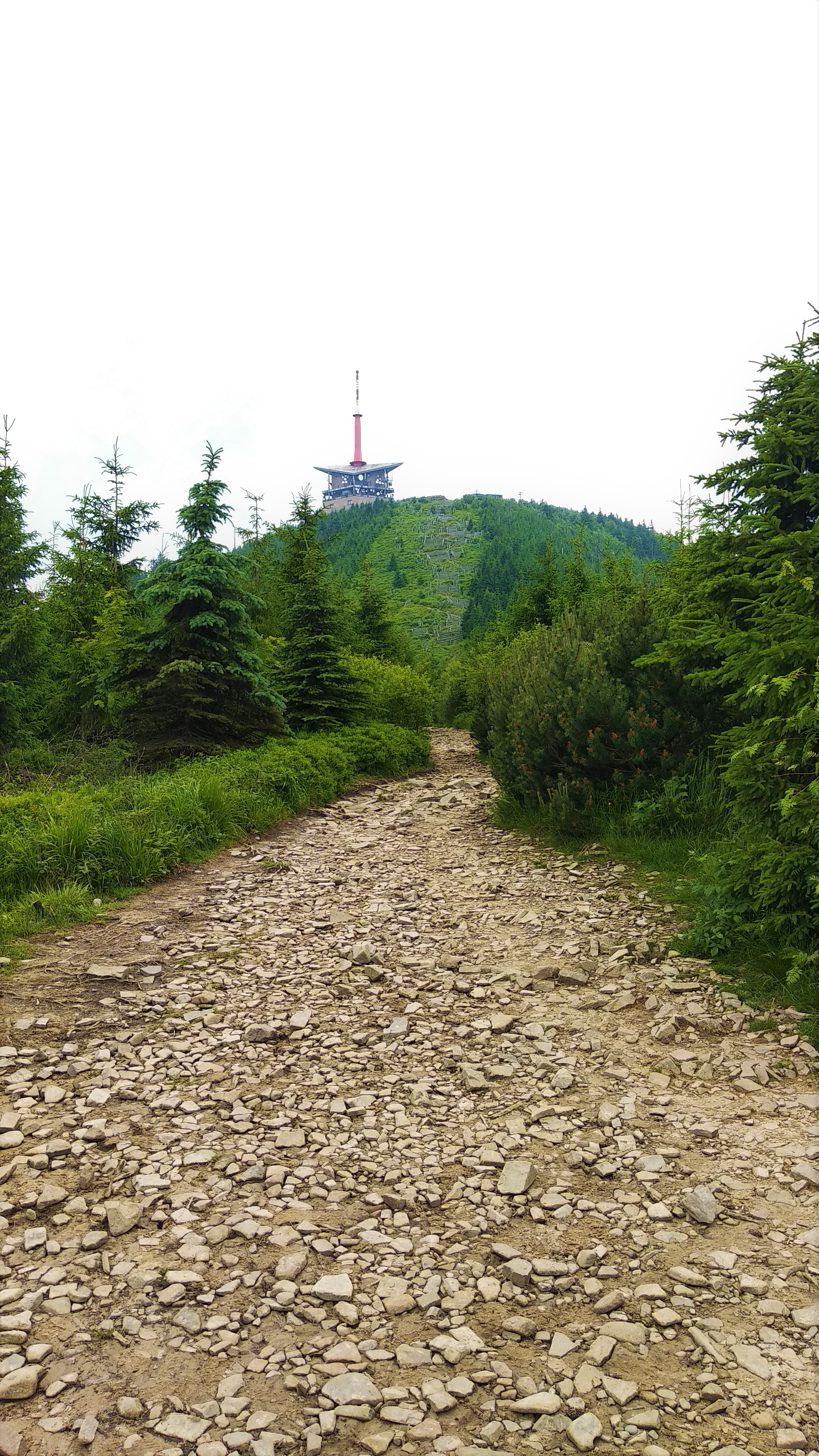
- The Lysá hora mountain—symbol of the region

- Flag Coat of arms

- Coordinates: 49°47′N 18°01′E
- Country: Czech Republic
- Capital: Ostrava
- Districts: Bruntál District, Frýdek-Místek District, Karviná District, Nový Jičín District, Opava District, Ostrava-City District

Government
  - Governor: Josef Bělica (ANO)

Area
  - Total: 5,426.83 km^{2} (2,095.31 sq mi)
- Highest elevation: 1,491 m (4,892 ft)

Population (2024-01-01)
  - Total: 1,189,204
  - Density: 219.134/km^{2} (567.555/sq mi)

GDP
  - Total: CZK 543.164 billion (€21.183 billion)
- ISO 3166 code: CZ-80
- Vehicle registration: T
- Website: www.msk.cz

The Moravian-Silesian Region (Czech: Moravskoslezský kraj) is one of the 14 administrative regions of the Czech Republic. Before May 2001, it was called the Ostrava Region (Czech: Ostravský kraj). The region is located in the north-eastern part of its historical region of Moravia and in most of the Czech part of the historical region of Silesia. The region borders the Olomouc Region to the west and the Zlín Region to the south. It also borders two other countries — Poland (Opole and Silesian Voivodeships) to the north and Slovakia (Žilina Region) to the east.

It is a highly industrialized region, its capital Ostrava was actually called the "Steel Heart of the Republic". In addition, it has several mountainous areas where the landscape is relatively preserved. Nowadays, the economy of the region benefits from its location in the Czech/Polish/Slovak borderlands.

== Administrative division ==
Traditionally, the region has been divided into six districts (Czech: okresy) which still exist as regional units, though most administration has been shifted to the municipalities with extended competence and the municipalities with commissioned local authority. (There are a total of 300 municipalities (39 are towns).)

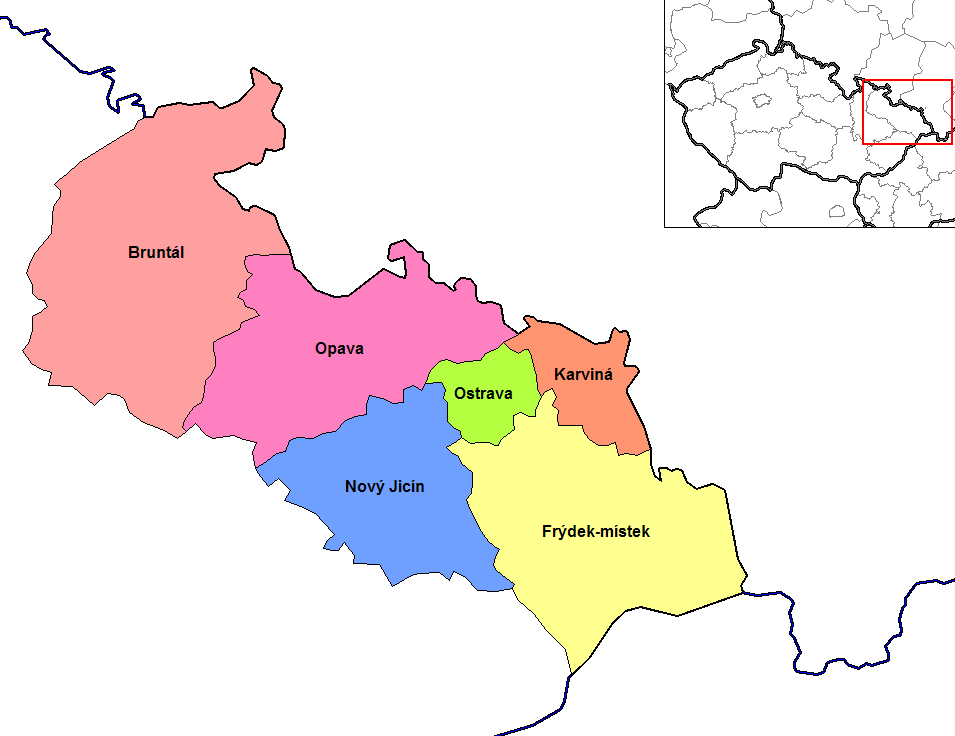
Districts of Moravia-Silesia Region

Bruntál; Frýdek-Místek	Karviná; Nový Jičín	Opava; Ostrava City

=== Municipalities with extended competence ===
Since 1 January 2003, the region has been divided into 22 municipalities with extended competence, which took over most of the administration of the former district authorities. Some of these are further divided into municipalities with commissioned local authority. They are unofficially named little districts (Czech: malé okresy). They are:

- Bílovec
- Bohumín
- Bruntál
- Český Těšín
- Frenštát pod Radhoštěm
- Frýdek-Místek
- Frýdlant nad Ostravicí
- Havířov
- Hlučín
- Jablunkov
- Karviná
- Kopřivnice
- Kravaře
- Krnov
- Nový Jičín
- Odry
- Opava
- Orlová
- Ostrava
- Rýmařov
- Třinec
- Vítkov

== Population ==
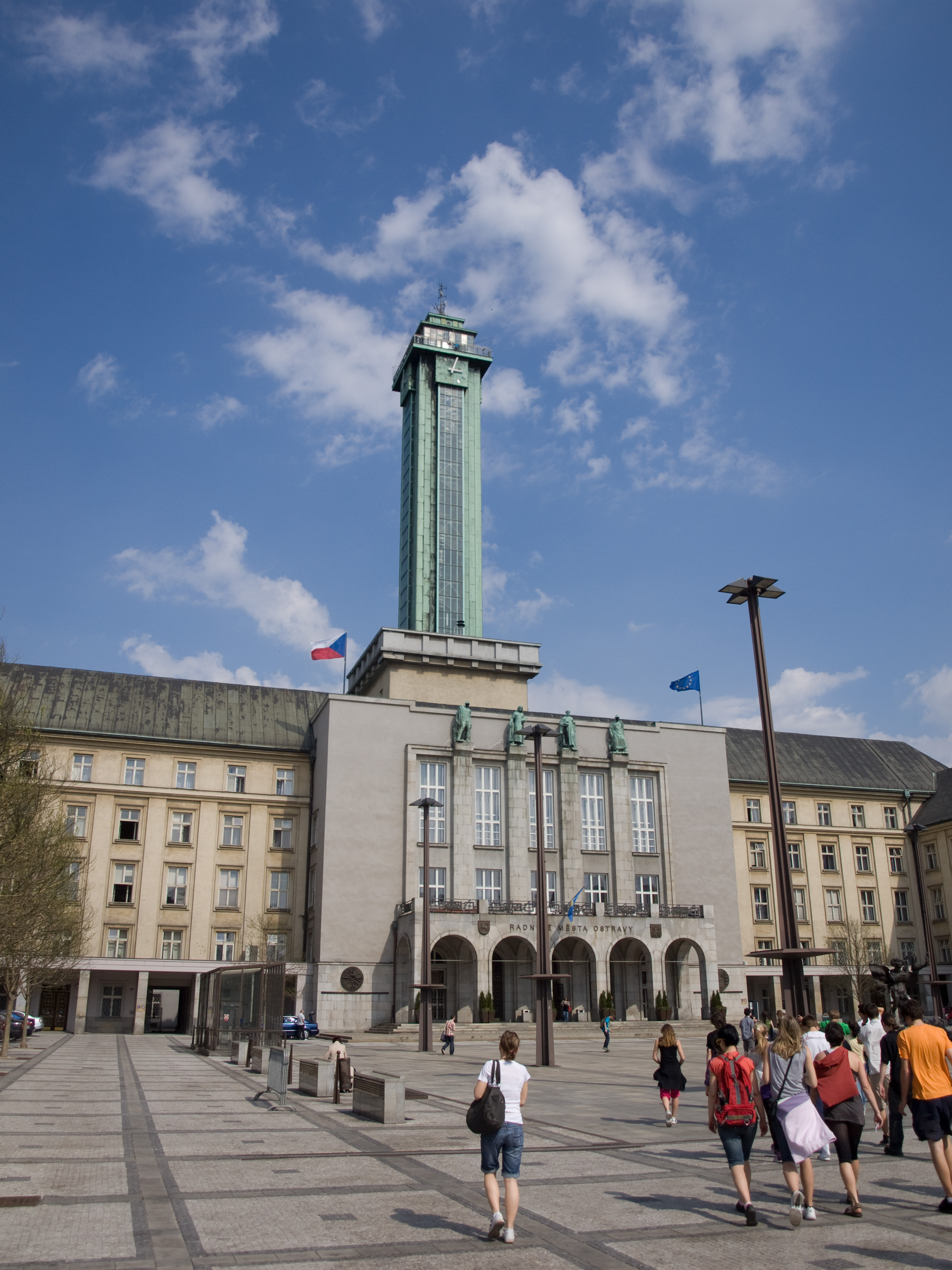
Ostrava City Hall

The total population of the region was 1,203,292 (men 49.1%, women 50.9%) in 2019, which makes it the third most populous region in the Czech Republic; 86.9% are Czechs, 3.3% Slovaks, 3.0% Poles, 2.3% Moravians, 0.8% Silesians, 0.3% Germans, and 0.2% Romani, though this last figure might be considerably higher, as Romani often do not officially admit their ethnicity. Around 40.2% of the population is religious, mostly Roman Catholic, while 52.3% declares as atheist.

The population density is 222 inhabitants per km^{2}, which is the second-highest in the country, after the capital Prague. Most of the population is urban, with 59% living in towns with over 20,000 inhabitants. The average age of the population in the region was 42.7 in 2019.

=== Cities and towns ===
The table shows cities and towns in the region with the largest population (as of 1 January 2024):

Name	Population	Area (km^{2})	District
Ostrava	284,765	214	Ostrava-City District
Havířov	69,694	32	Karviná District
Opava	55,600	91	Opava District
Frýdek-Místek	53,938	52	Frýdek-Místek District
Karviná	49,724	57	Karviná District
Třinec	34,266	85	Frýdek-Místek District
Orlová	27,794	25	Karviná District
Český Těšín	23,282	34	Karviná District
Nový Jičín	22,993	45	Nový Jičín District
Krnov	22,716	44	Bruntál District
Kopřivnice	21,604	27	Nový Jičín District
Bohumín	20,519	31	Karviná District
Bruntál	15,244	29	Bruntál District
Hlučín	13,421	21	Opava District
Frenštát pod Radhoštěm	10,676	11	Nový Jičín District
Studénka	9,309	30	Nový Jičín District

Historical population

Year	Pop.	±%
1869	564,203	—
1880	620,061	+9.9%
1890	677,048	+9.2%
1900	791,328	+16.9%
1910	892,795	+12.8%

Year	Pop.	±%
1921	912,022	+2.2%
1930	992,941	+8.9%
1950	867,783	−12.6%
1961	1,028,762	+18.6%
1970	1,166,807	+13.4%

Year	Pop.	±%
1980	1,257,090	+7.7%
1991	1,278,726	+1.7%
2001	1,265,019	−1.1%
2011	1,205,836	−4.7%
2021	1,162,841	−3.6%

Source: Censuses

== Economy ==
The Gross domestic product (GDP) of the region was 19.6 billion € in 2018, accounting for 9.5% of Czech economic output. GDP per capita adjusted for purchasing power was 23,000 € or 76% of the EU27 average in the same year. The GDP per employee was 74% of the EU average.

== Geography ==
The geography of the region varies considerably, comprising many land forms from lowlands to high mountains whose summits lie above the tree line.

In the west lie the Hrubý Jeseník mountains, with the highest mountain of the region (and all Moravia), Praděd, rising 1,491 metres (4,892 ft). The mountains are heavily forested, with many spectacular places and famous spas such as Karlova Studánka and Jeseník, so are very popular with tourists. Also, several ski resorts are there, including Červenohorské Sedlo and Ovčárna, with long-lasting snow cover. The Hrubý Jeseník mountains slowly merge into the rolling hills of the Nízký Jeseníks and Oderské Vrchy, rising to 800 m at Slunečná and 680 m at Fidlův Kopec, respectively.

To the east, the landscape gradually descends into the Moravian Gate valley with the Bečva and Oder Rivers. The former flows to the south-west, the latter to the north-east, where the terrain spreads into the flat Ostrava Basin and Opava Hilly Land, where most of the population lives. The region's heavy industry, which has been in decline for the last decade, is located there, too, benefiting from huge deposits of hard coal. The confluence of the Odra and Olza is the lowest point of the region, at 195 m.

To the south-east, towards the Slovak border, the landscape sharply rises into the Moravian-Silesian Beskids, with its highest mountain Lysá hora at 1,323 m (4,341 ft), which is the place with the highest annual rainfall in the Czech Republic, 1,500 mm (100 in) a year. The mountains are heavily forested and serve as a holiday resort for the industrial north.

=== Nature conservation ===
Three large landscape protected areas and a number of smaller nature reserves are in the region. The countryside is mostly man-made, but five natural parks with preserved natural scenery exist.

The Jeseníky PLA (with an area of 745 km^{2} or 288 sq mi) lies in the mountain range of the same name in the north east of the region. The terrain is very diverse, with steep slopes and deep valleys. About 80%t of the area is forested, mostly by secondary plantations of Norway spruce, which were seriously damaged by industrial emissions. Due to local weather conditions, the tree line in the area descends to 1,200–1,300 m (3,900–4,300 ft). Alpine meadows can be found in particularly low elevations in the Jeseník mountains. Also, a few peat moors are found there, which are otherwise nonexistent in Moravia.

The Poodří PLA (81.5 km^{2} or 31.5 sq mi) lies in the Moravian Gate, in close proximity to the region's capital Ostrava, on the banks of the meandering Odra. It is an area of floodplain forests (one of the last preserved in Central Europe), flooded meadows, and many shallow ponds, on which water birds thrive.

The Beskydy Protected Landscape Area (1,160 km^{2} or 450 sq mi) is the largest Czech protected landscape area (PLA). It lies in the south-east of the region, along the Slovak boundary. In the north, the mountains rise steeply from the Ostrava basin, to the south their elevation and severity decreases. Most of the area is forested, mainly by Norway spruce plantations, which are not indigenous to the area. Many of these were severely damaged by emissions from the Ostrava industrial region. There are, however, also a lot of either newly planted or preserved forests of European beech, which in the past covered most of the mountains. The PLA is typical by its mosaic of forests and highland meadows and pastures with hamlets scattered throughout all the mountains. In recent years bear and wolf sighting have become more frequent.

Altogether, 125 small, protected nature areas cover an area of 52 km^{2} or 20 sq mi. The most notable of them is the lime Šipka Cave near Štramberk, where remnants of a Neanderthal man were discovered in the late 19th century.

=== Places of interest ===
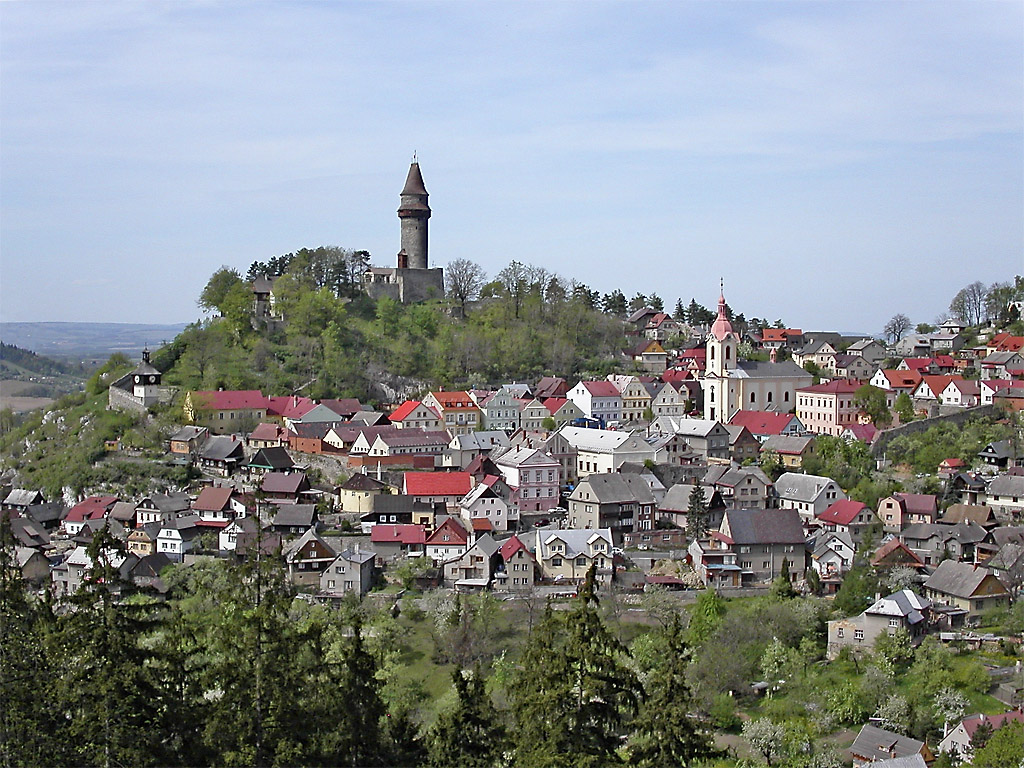
Štramberk

There are three towns with protected historical centers. Příbor, the birthplace of Sigmund Freud, was an important center of education for northern Moravia from the 17th century to the first half of the 20th. Nový Jičín, founded under the castle of Starý Jičín, has a well-preserved central square dating back to the 14th century, with the Žerotínský château nearby. Štramberk is a unique small town nestled in a valley between lime hills, with many timber houses and the Trúba Spire rising on a hill above the town.

Many castles and châteaus are in the region, the most famous being Hradec nad Moravicí, Raduň, Kravaře, and Fulnek. Hukvaldy, in a village of the same name under the Moravian-Silesian Beskids, is one of the region's many castle ruins, known for a musical festival dedicated to the composer Leoš Janáček, who was born there. Another well-known castle ruin is Sovinec under the Hrubý Jeseník.

Due to the importance of industry in the region, many museums display products of local technical development. The Automobile Museum in Kopřivnice exhibits the history of the Tatra cars, The Train Carriage Museum is in Studénka, and the Mining Museum and the former Michal Mine (Důl Michal) are in Ostrava.

== History ==
Until 2000, the current region did not exist as such, but was organized as part of a larger administrative unit called the North Moravian Region. Six of its districts, Bruntál, Frýdek-Místek, Karviná, Nový Jičín, Opava, and Ostrava, were in 2000 put into the newly established Moravian-Silesian Region. The old North Moravian Region still exists and jurisdiction of some administrative bodies is defined by its borders.

== See also ==
- Lach dialects
- Silesia Euroregion
