= Lubina (river) =

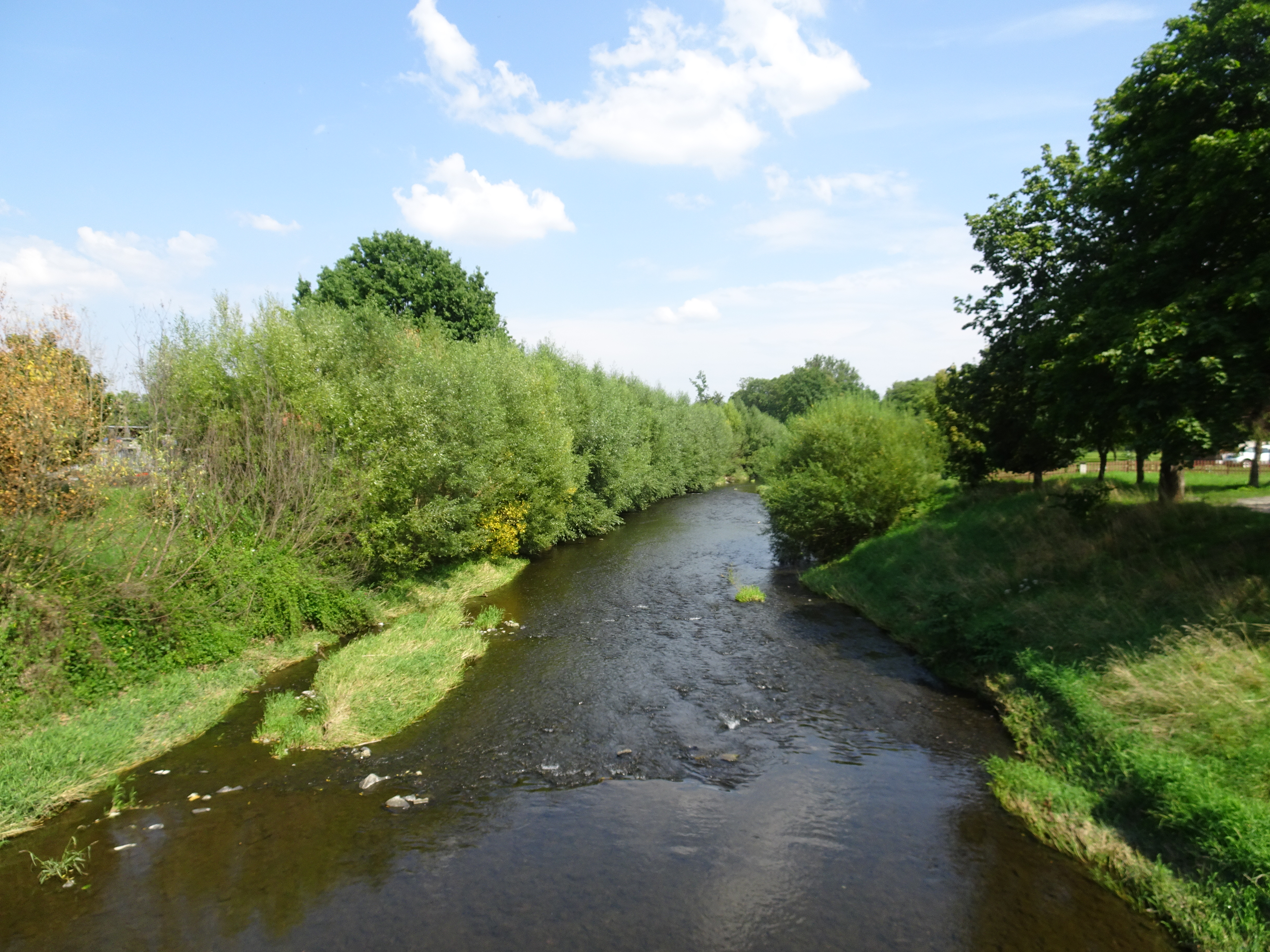
- The Lubina in Petřvald

Location
- Country: Czech Republic
- Region: Moravian-Silesian

Physical characteristics
- Source
  - location: Trojanovice, Moravian-Silesian Beskids
  - coordinates: 49°29′33″N 18°11′48″E
  - elevation: 674 m (2,211 ft)
- Mouth
  - location: Oder
  - coordinates: 49°44′47″N 18°10′16″E
  - elevation: 220 m (720 ft)
- Length: 36.8 km (22.9 mi)
- Basin size: 194.9 km^{2} (75.3 sq mi)
- Discharge
  - average: 2.50 m^{3}/s (88 cu ft/s) near estuary

Basin features
- Progression: Oder→ Baltic Sea

The Lubina is a river in the Czech Republic, a right tributary of the Oder River. It flows through the Moravian-Silesian Region. It is 36.8 km (22.9 mi) long.

== Name ==
The name of the river was first documented in the 13th century. The village of Lubina (today part of Kopřivnice) was named after the river.

== Characteristic ==
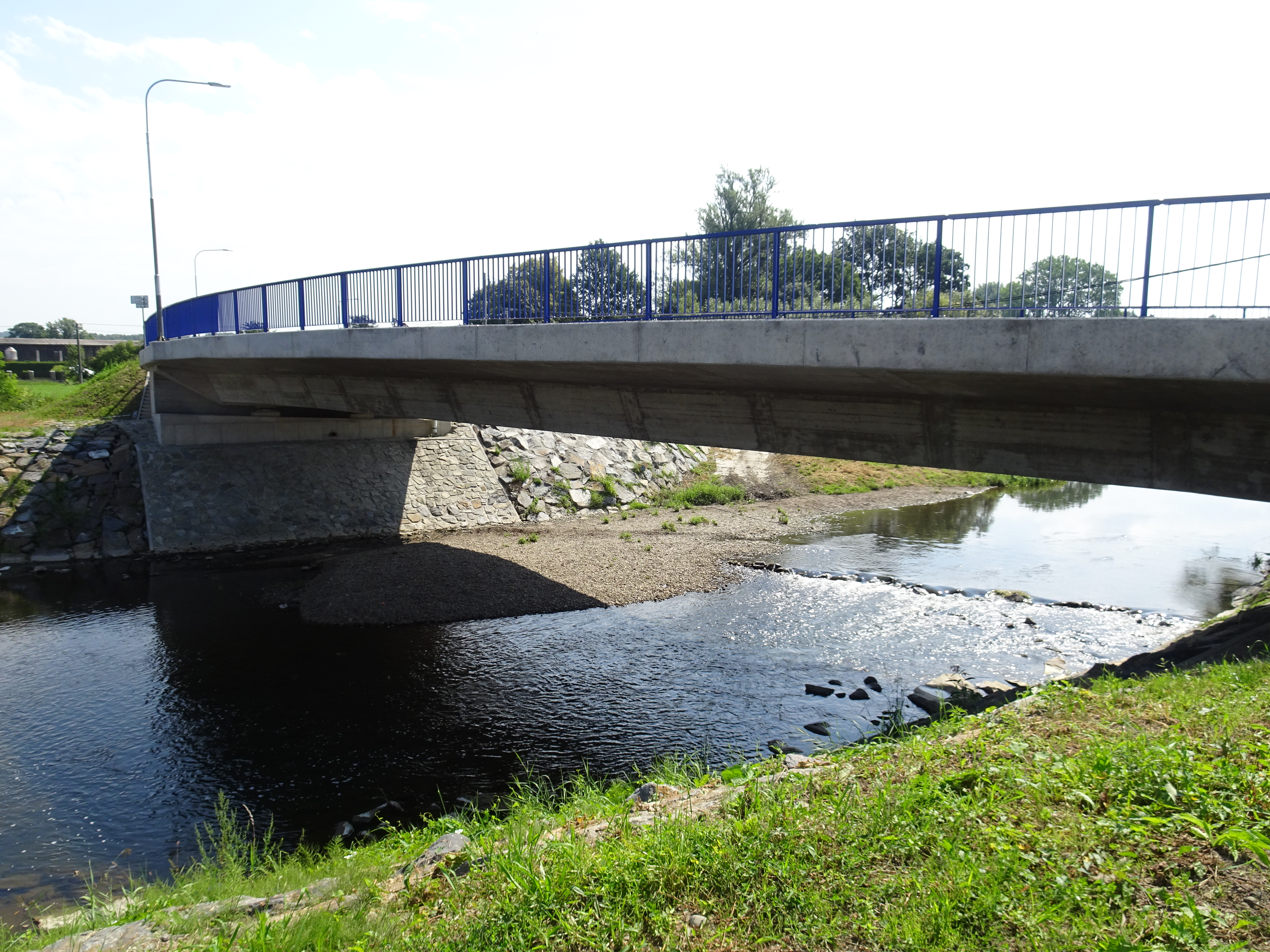
The Lubina in Stará Ves nad Ondřejnicí

The Lubina originates in the territory of Trojanovice in the Moravian-Silesian Beskids range at an elevation of 674 m (2,211 ft) and flows to Jistebník, where it enters the Oder River at an elevation of 220 m (720 ft). It is 36.8 km (22.9 mi) long. Its drainage basin has an area of 194.9 km^{2} (75.3 sq mi). The average discharge at 5.2 river km (before the confluence with the Trnávka) is 2.36 m^{3}/s (83 cu ft/s).

The longest tributaries of the Lubina are:

| Tributary | Length (km) | Side |
|---|---|---|
| Tichávka | 14.2 | right |
| Lomná | 11.5 | right |
| Trnávka | 10.0 | right |
| Kopřivnička | 7.3 | left |

== Course ==
The river flows through the municipal territories of Trojanovice, Frenštát pod Radhoštěm, Tichá, Lichnov, Kopřivnice, Příbor, Skotnice, Mošnov, Petřvald, Stará Ves nad Ondřejnicí and Jistebník.

== Nature ==
The mouth of the river is located within the Poodří Protected Landscape Area. Among the protected species of animals that live in the river are the European crayfish and the fish common minnow and alpine bullhead. The river is also a hunting ground for the Eurasian otter and common kingfisher.

== See also ==
- List of rivers of the Czech Republic
