= Trojanovice =

- Municipality
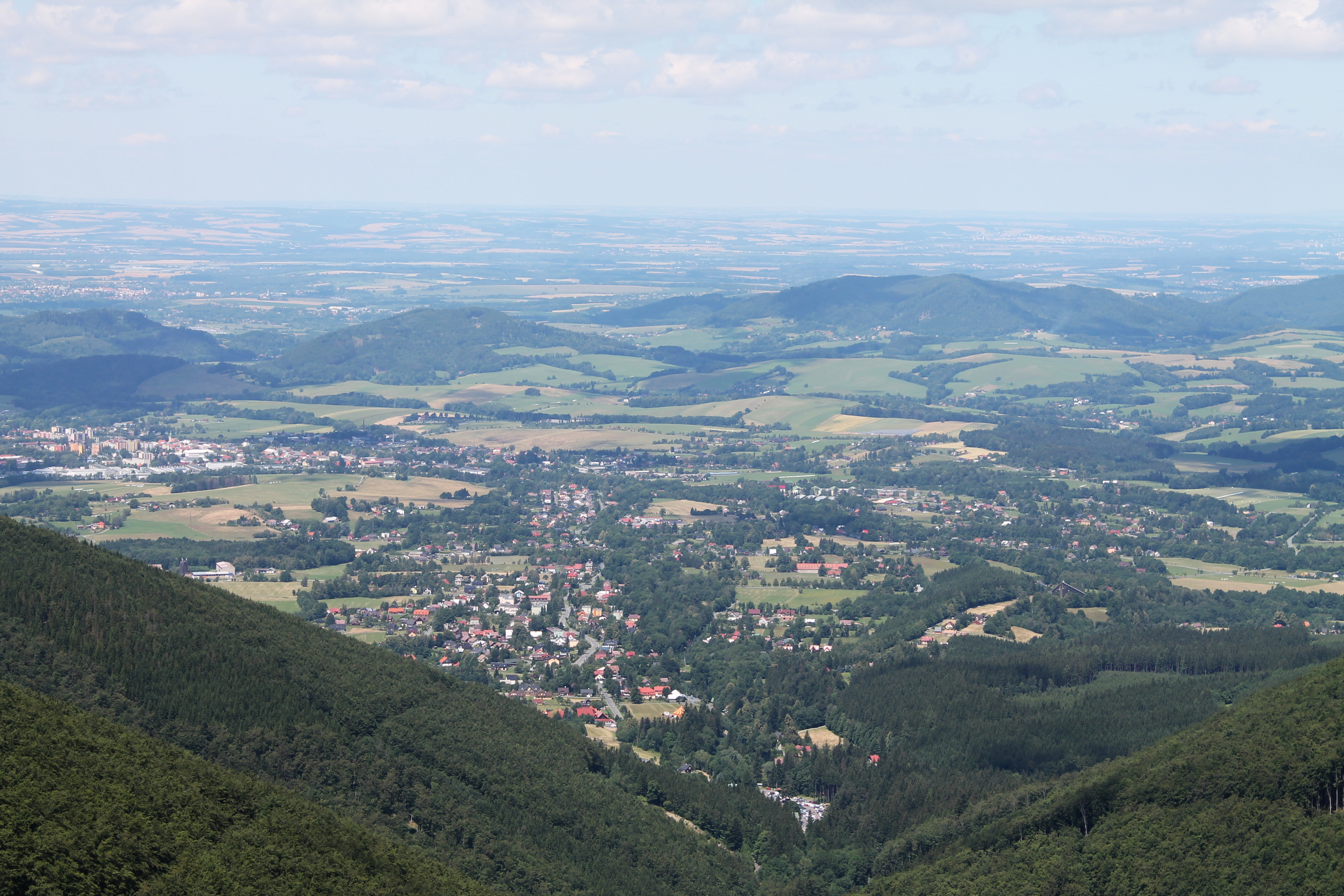
- Trojanovice seen from Radhošť

- Flag Coat of arms

- Location in the Czech Republic
- Coordinates: 49°31′13″N 18°14′17″E
- Country: Czech Republic
- Region: Moravian-Silesian
- District: Nový Jičín
- Founded: 1748

Area
  - Total: 35.85 km^{2} (13.84 sq mi)
- Elevation: 500 m (1,600 ft)

Population (2026-01-01)
  - Total: 2,710
  - Density: 75.6/km^{2} (196/sq mi)
- Time zone: UTC+1 (CET)
  - Summer (DST): UTC+2 (CEST)
- Postal code: 744 01
- Website: www.trojanovice.cz

Trojanovice is a municipality and village in Nový Jičín District in the Moravian-Silesian Region of the Czech Republic. It has about 2,700 inhabitants.

== Geography ==
Trojanovice is located about 18 kilometres (11 mi) southeast of Nový Jičín and 30 km (19 mi) south of Ostrava. It lies in the Moravian-Silesian Beskids mountain range. The highest point is the Radhošť mountain at 1,129 m (3,704 ft) above sea level, the summit of which lies on the southern municipal border.

The territory of Trojanovice is rich in watercourses. The Lomná River flows through the municipality. The Lubina River originates in the woods in the western part of the municipality.

== History ==
The colonisation of the area of Trojanovice by Vlachs began in the 16th century, when it belonged to Frenštát pod Radhoštěm. It was settled mostly by pastoralists. In 1748, it separated from Frenštát pod Radhoštěm as a self-governing municipality.

Between 1850 and 1900, almost 500 inhabitants of Trojanovice moved abroad, especially to Texas; their descendants live in Fayetteville, Weimar, Hostyn, Dubina and nearby.

== Demographics ==
Historical population

Year	Pop.	±%
1869	2,326	—
1880	2,190	−5.8%
1890	2,032	−7.2%
1900	2,088	+2.8%
1910	2,310	+10.6%

Year	Pop.	±%
1921	2,060	−10.8%
1930	2,178	+5.7%
1950	2,047	−6.0%
1961	2,117	+3.4%
1970	2,040	−3.6%

Year	Pop.	±%
1980	2,156	+5.7%
1991	1,953	−9.4%
2001	2,062	+5.6%
2011	2,261	+9.7%
2021	2,554	+13.0%

Source: Censuses

== Transport ==
The I/58 road from Ostrava to Rožnov pod Radhoštěm runs through the western part of the municipal territory.

== Sport ==
The Pustevny Ski Resort is located in the southern part of the municipality. The cable car that leads to the Pustevny mountain saddle was built in 1940 and was the first of its kind in the world.

== Sights ==
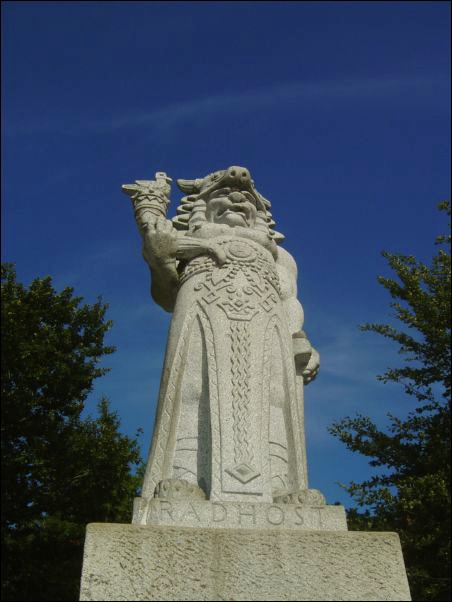
Radegast statue

On the Radhošť mountain there are located the Chapel of Saints Cyril and Methodius, and the Radegast statue by Albin Polasek (the original from 1929 was replaced with a copy in 1998).

The Velký Javorník mountain is one of the most visited tourist destination in the Moravian-Silesian Beskids. There is a 26 m (85 ft)-high wooden observation tower, a restaurant built in 1935, and a paragliding ramp.
