= Petřvald =

Petřvald may refer to places in the Czech Republic:

- Petřvald (Karviná District), a town in the Moravian-Silesian Region
- Petřvald (Nový Jičín District), a municipality and village in the Moravian-Silesian Region
