= Příbor =

- Town
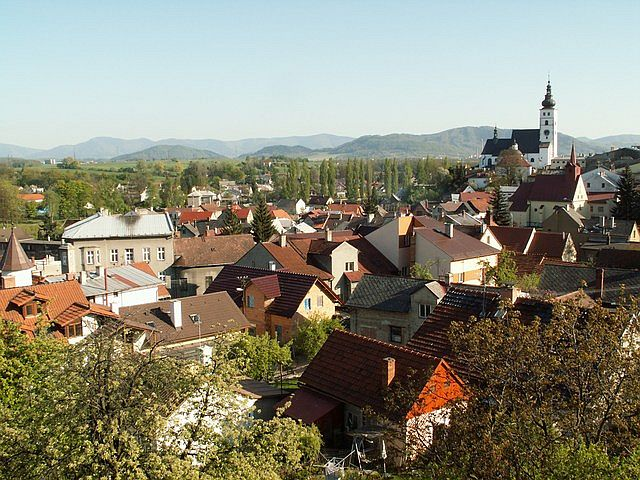
- General view of the town

- Flag Coat of arms

- Location in the Czech Republic
- Coordinates: 49°38′27″N 18°8′42″E
- Country: Czech Republic
- Region: Moravian-Silesian
- District: Nový Jičín
- First mentioned: 1251

Government
  - Mayor: Jiří Tuza

Area
  - Total: 22.15 km^{2} (8.55 sq mi)
- Elevation: 278 m (912 ft)

Population (2026-01-01)
  - Total: 8,311
  - Density: 375.2/km^{2} (971.8/sq mi)
- Time zone: UTC+1 (CET)
  - Summer (DST): UTC+2 (CEST)
- Postal code: 742 58
- Website: www.pribor.eu

Příbor (Czech pronunciation: [ˈpr̝̊iːbor]; German: Freiberg (in Mähren)) is a town in Nový Jičín District in the Moravian-Silesian Region of the Czech Republic. It has about 8,300 inhabitants. The town is located on the Lubina River in the Moravian-Silesian Foothills. It is known as the birthplace of neurologist Sigmund Freud, the founder of psychoanalysis.

Příbor was founded in 1251. The historic centre of Příbor is well preserved and is protected as an urban monument reservation. The main landmarks of the town are the Church of the Nativity of the Virgin Mary and the former Piarist monastery.

== Administrative division ==
Příbor consists of three municipal parts (in brackets population according to the 2021 census):

- Příbor (7,464)
- Hájov (494)
- Prchalov (264)

== Etymology ==
Although the name of the town literally means 'cutlery' in modern Czech, it is just a coincidence. It is not certain whether the Czech name Příbor originated earlier and the German name Freiberg was derived by transcription, or vice versa. If the Czech name is older, it was probably derived from při boru or při zboru, meaning 'at a pine forest' / 'at a ruin'. If the German name is older, the modern corruption Freiberg – originally rendered Vriburch or Freiburg – means 'free castle' or 'castle with free access'. Some German-language maps from the 19th century identify Příbor as Freyberg.

== Geography ==
Příbor is located about 10 kilometres (6 mi) east of Nový Jičín and 20 km (12 mi) southwest of Ostrava. It lies in the Moravian-Silesian Foothills. The highest point is at 370 m (1,214 ft) above sea level. The Lubina River flows through the town.

== History ==
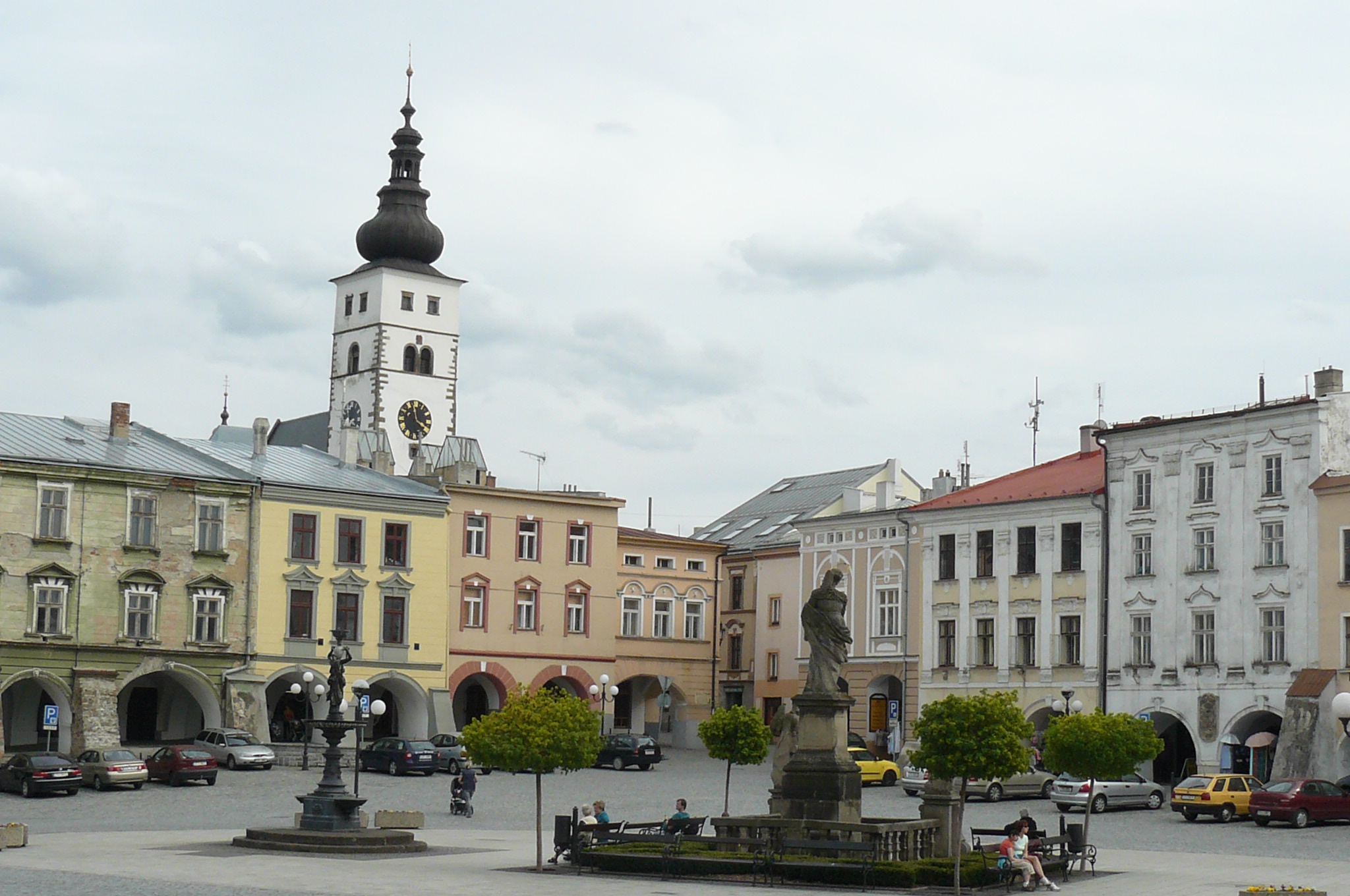
The square Náměstí Sigmunda Freuda

The town of Příbor was founded by Count Frank von Hückeswagen in 1251, which was confirmed in a deed of Moravian margrave Ottokar II from the same year, where the town was called Vriburch. The town square was founded right on an old trade route to Poland.

Count von Hückeswagen built here a solid castle. His descendants owned the town until 1359, when Příbor passed to the Bishops of Olomouc. The bishops liked the town, especially Franz von Dietrichstein, who granted it a number of privileges. During the Thirty Years' War, the town burned down three times. The most destructive was the invasion of the Swedish army in 1643. In the second half of the 17th century, the town recovered.

In 1694, a Piarist gymnasium was established and education was also available to the poorer people. Příbor developed to an important centre of education. From 1875 to 1938, the Czech Teacher Institute operated here, from which a number of significant pedagogues and experts in education and culture came.

== Demographics ==
Historical population

| Year | Pop. | ±% |
|---|---|---|
| 1869 | 6,281 | — |
| 1880 | 6,546 | +4.2% |
| 1890 | 6,634 | +1.3% |
| 1900 | 7,242 | +9.2% |
| 1910 | 8,354 | +15.4% |

| Year | Pop. | ±% |
|---|---|---|
| 1921 | 7,811 | −6.5% |
| 1930 | 7,701 | −1.4% |
| 1950 | 6,149 | −20.2% |
| 1961 | 7,409 | +20.5% |
| 1970 | 8,378 | +13.1% |

| Year | Pop. | ±% |
|---|---|---|
| 1980 | 9,878 | +17.9% |
| 1991 | 8,887 | −10.0% |
| 2001 | 8,754 | −1.5% |
| 2011 | 8,366 | −4.4% |
| 2021 | 8,222 | −1.7% |

Source: Censuses

== Transport ==
The D48 motorway (part of the European route E462) from Nový Jičín to the Czech–Polish border runs through the town.

Příbor is located on the railway line Ostrava–Veřovice.

== Sights ==
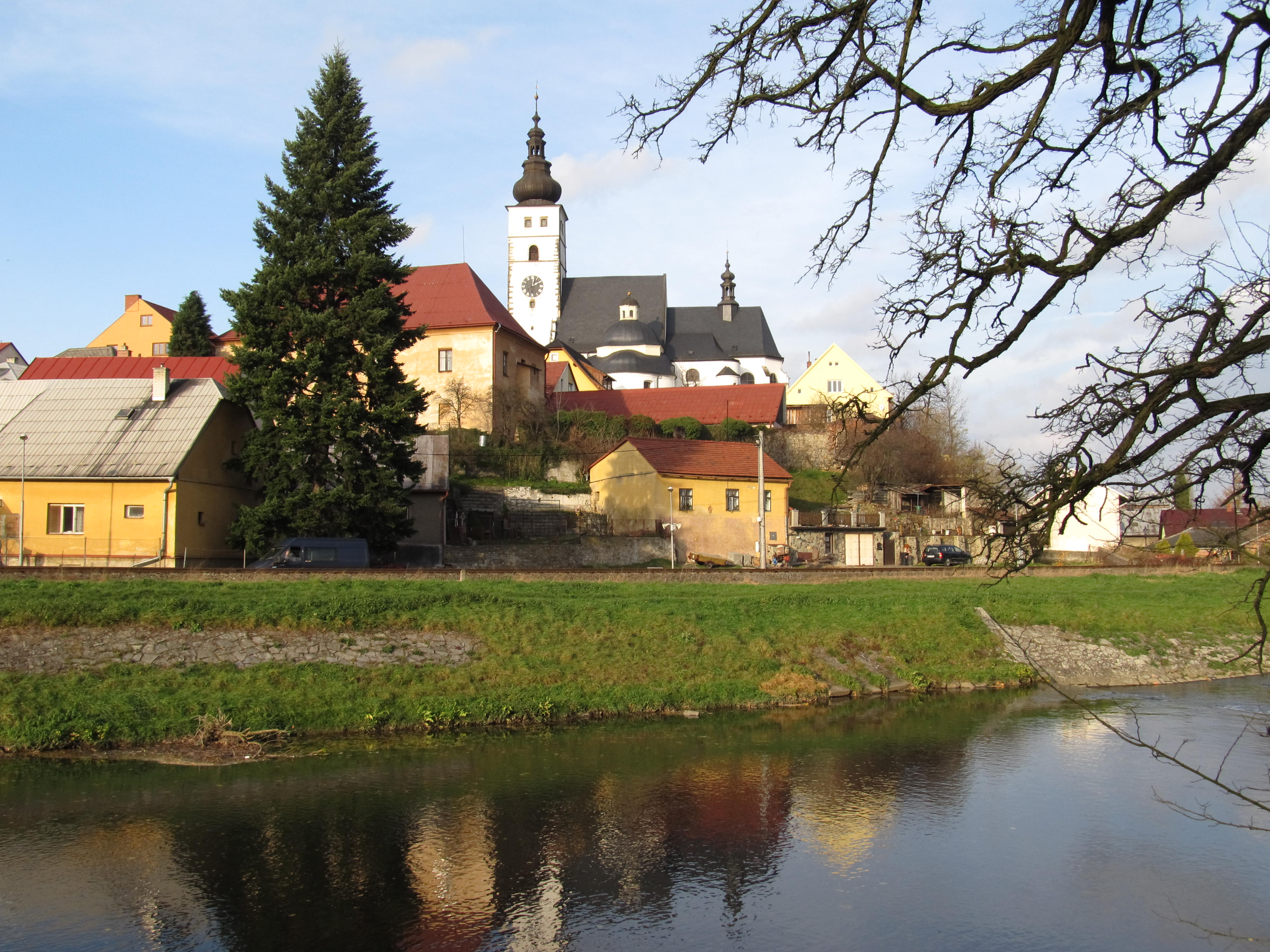
Church of the Nativity of the Virgin Mary

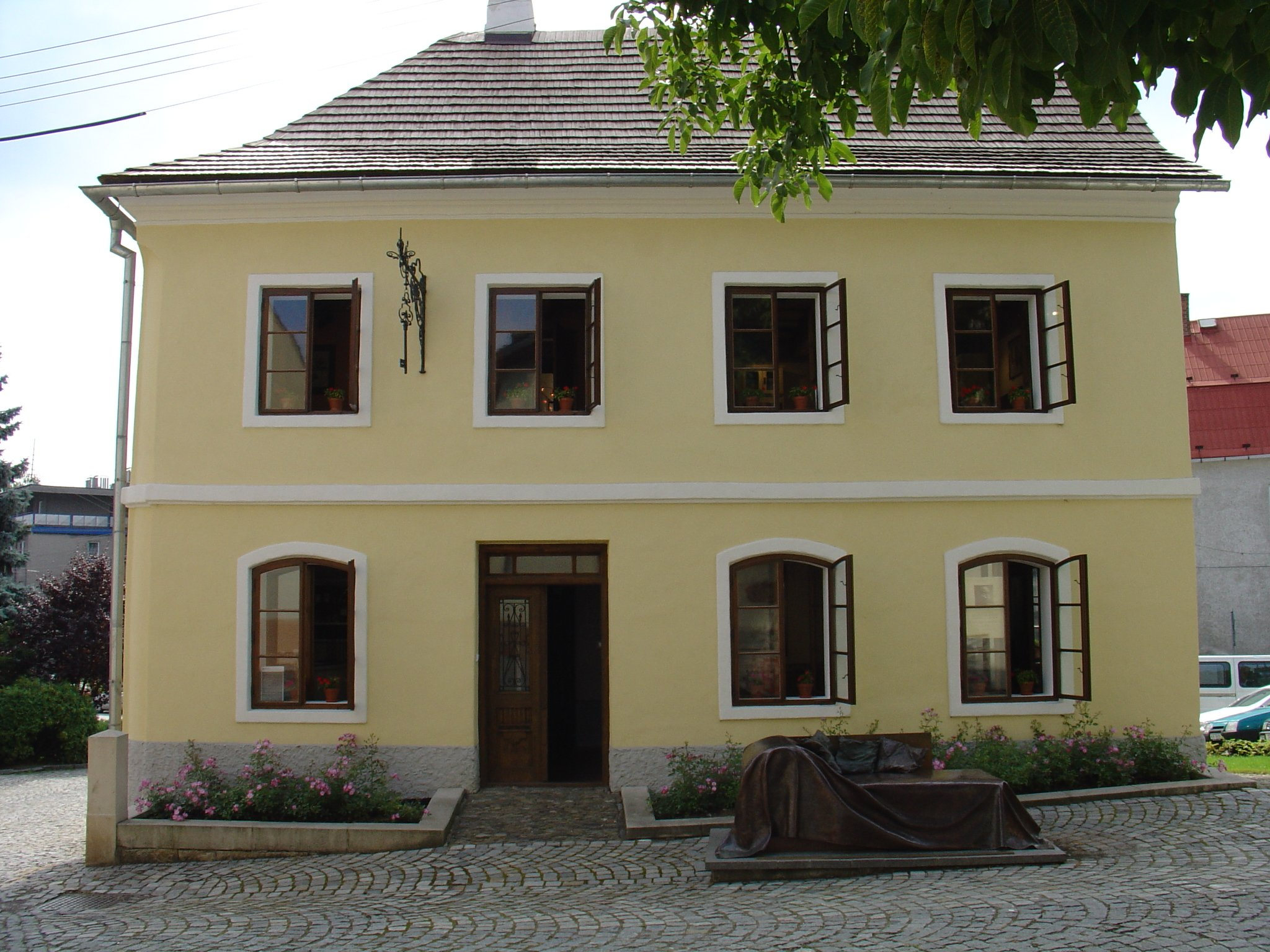
Birthplace of Sigmund Freud, now a museum

Příbor is one of the oldest towns in the region. The historic centre is formed by a regular town square lined with burgher houses, which are mainly Renaissance with Baroque alterations.

The Piarist monastery was founded here in 1694 by Karl II von Liechtenstein-Kastelkorn. It is a Baroque three-wing single-storey building. Today it houses the town museum, a library and a primary art school.

There are four churches in the town. The most important is the Church of the Nativity of the Virgin Mary. The Romanesque-Gothic parish church with later Renaissance and Baroque adaptations was founded together with the town, but the current brick building dates from the 14th century. It is a very rugged building with a number of elements added later, dominated by a slender tall tower. The interior contains valuable rococo furniture.

Other churches in the historic centre are the Church of the Holy Cross and the former Piarist Church of Saint Valentine. Outside the historic centre is located the Church of Saint Francis of Assisi.

The birthplace of Sigmund Freud is now a museum with an exhibition about his life and work.

== Notable people ==
- Jan Sarkander (1576–1620), Polish-Czech priest and saint; lived and studied here in 1589–1597
- Antonín Cyril Stojan (1851–1923), Archbishop of Olomouc; studied here and worked here as chaplain
- Sigmund Freud (1856–1939), Austrian neurologist and the founder of psychoanalysis
- Filip Panák (born 1995), footballer

== Twin towns – sister cities ==
Příbor is twinned with:

- Przedbórz, Poland
