= Jan Sarkander =

Polish-Czech Roman Catholic priest

Saint Jan Sarkander
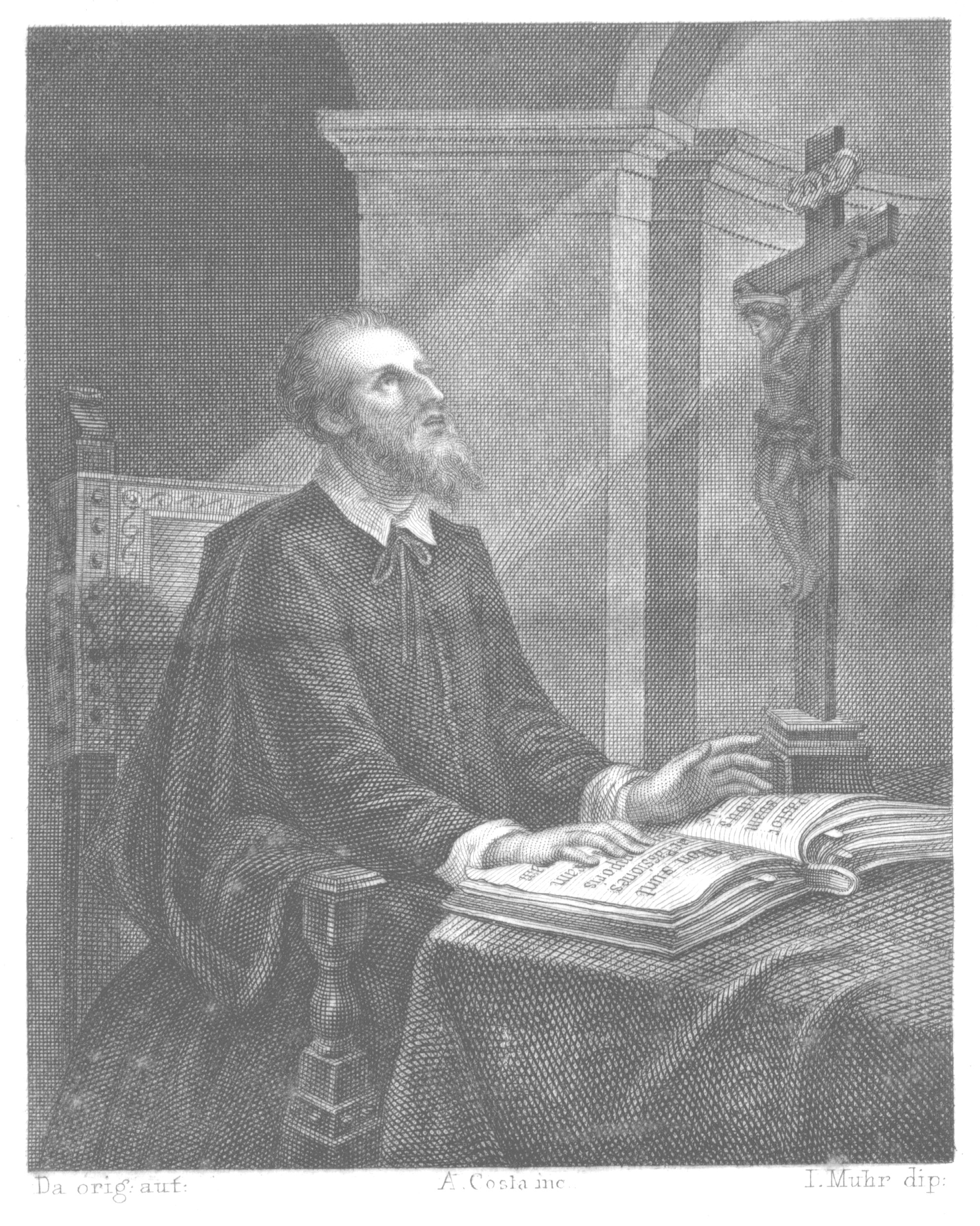
- Sketch from 1855

Martyr
- Born: 20 December 1576; Skoczów, Silesia, Crown of Bohemia (now Poland)
- Died: 17 March 1620 (aged 43); Olomouc, Moravia, Crown of Bohemia (now the Czech Republic)
- Venerated in: Roman Catholic Church
- Beatified: 6 May 1860, Saint Peter's Basilica by Pope Pius IX
- Canonized: 21 May 1995, Olomouc, Czech Republic by Pope John Paul II
- Feast: 17 March

Jan Sarkander (Czech and Polish: Jan Sarkander) (20 December 1576 – 17 March 1620) was a Polish-Czech Roman Catholic priest. Sarkander was married for a short period of time before he became widowed and pursued a path to the priesthood where he became active in defence of Catholicism during a period of anti-Catholic sentiment and conflict. He himself was arrested on false accusations as a means of silencing him and he refused to give in to his tormenters who tortured him for around a month before he died.

Pope Pius IX beatified Sarkander at Saint Peter's Basilica in 1860 and Pope John Paul II canonized him as a saint in 1995 on his visit to the Czech Republic.

== Life ==
Jan Sarkander was born on 20 December 1576 in Skoczów, Lands of Bohemian Crown (now in Poland) into a Silesian household as the son of Georg Mathias Sarkander and Helena Górecka. He had one sister and three other brothers: Nicholas (a priest himself), Paul, and Wenceslas. His father died in 1589 and so his family moved to Příbor. His mother remarried and gave birth to his half-brother Matthew. Sarkander intended to become a priest but dropped the idea and instead married. He and his wife then settled in Brno. The marriage was short-lived for his wife died one year later. There were no children. He then took up studies for the priesthood, convinced that God was calling him.

Sarkander studied at the Olomouc college from 1597 until 1600 due to the plague which forced him to transfer to the Charles University in Prague. He obtained his degree of master of philosophy at Prague in 1603. He continued theological studies in Austria from 1604. He later underwent theological studies at the University of Graz and passed his examinations on 21 December 1607. He was made a sub-deacon on 20 December 1608 and elevated into the diaconate on 16 March 1609.

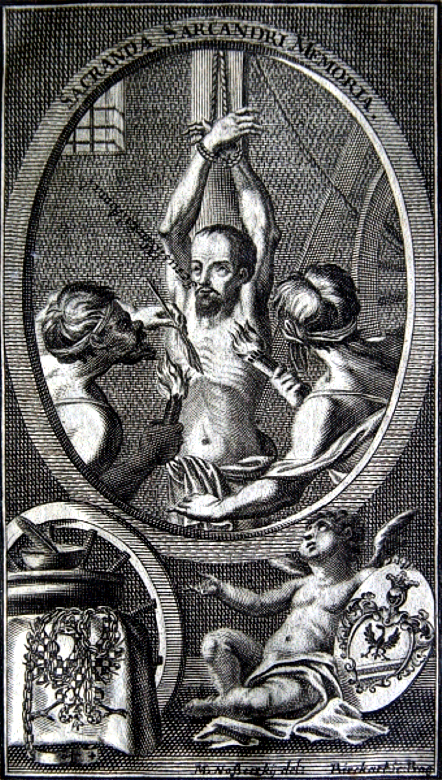
A 1715 etching depicting Sarkander's martyrdom encripted with "A sacred treasure of memory".

On 22 December 1607, he received the minor orders from Cardinal Franz von Dietrichstein. The bishop of Olomouc, Giovanni Battista Civalli, ordained him to the priesthood on 22 March 1609 in Graz. Sarkander was assigned to work as a parish priest in Boskovice and then sent to Holešov in 1616. Catholic noble Ladislav IV Popel of Lobkowicz supported Sarkander's efforts in the region but anti-Catholic nobleman Wenceslas Bítovský of Bítov opposed him to the extent that he wanted Sarkander killed. The Thirty Years War began in 1618 and it saw a bitter conflict between the Protestants and Catholics and this forced him to flee to Poland on 17 May 1619 for a brief period of time when the Protestants occupied Holešov. He made a pilgrimage to the Shrine of Our Lady of Czestochowa, and passed a few weeks of retreat with the Minims, who had a house there. He also spent a few months in Cracow. Then he returned home.

In February 1620 Polish auxiliary troops sent to the emperor by Sigismund III Vasa passed through Moravia and committed many depredations on the lands of the Protestants, but spared Holešov when Jan met them with the Blessed sacrament in his hands. The Jesuits helped him to reconcile 200 non-Catholics to the faith but other non-Catholics were severely angered by this.

During the ongoing Bohemian Revolt, Protestant Moravian Estates (under Wenceslas Bítovský of Bítov) accused Sarkander of collaborating with Lord Lobkowitz to bring the enemy into the territory. He was taken prisoner and brought to Olomouc where he was tortured. Sarkander was interrogated regarding who had called the troops into the country; what dealings had he in Poland, and with whom; and what had Lobkowitz confided to him in confession. He refused to divulge what was said under the seal of confession. The rack was used on him on 13 February and again on the 17th and 18th for up to three hours. Lit candles were applied to him and feathers soaked in oil, pitch, and sulphur strewn over his body and ignited. He lingered for a month, before dying from the effects in prison on March 17, 1620.

== Veneration ==
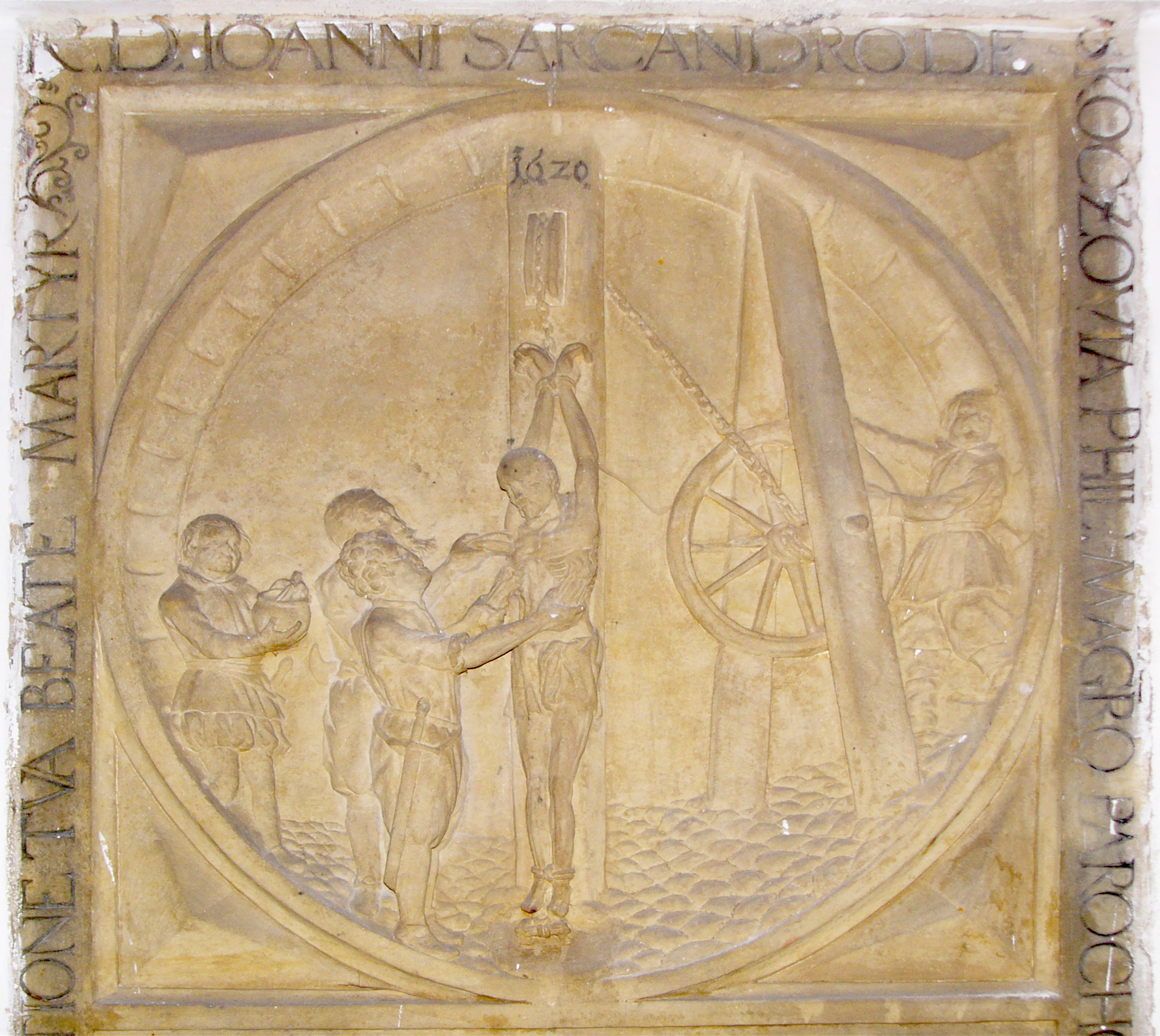
Relief of the torturing of Jan Sarkander on the torturing rack at Sarkander's gravestone.

The beatification process opened under Pope Benedict XIV, but the process was interrupted and thus remained inactive following this. Pope Pius IX approved the fact that Sarkander was killed in odium fidei ("in hatred of the faith") on 11 September 1859 and beatified him as a result on 6 May 1860. He is acknowledged as a martyr. Pope John Paul II approved a miracle due to the intercession of Sarkander on 2 April 1993 and canonized him on the occasion of his visit to the Czech Republic on 21 May 1995.

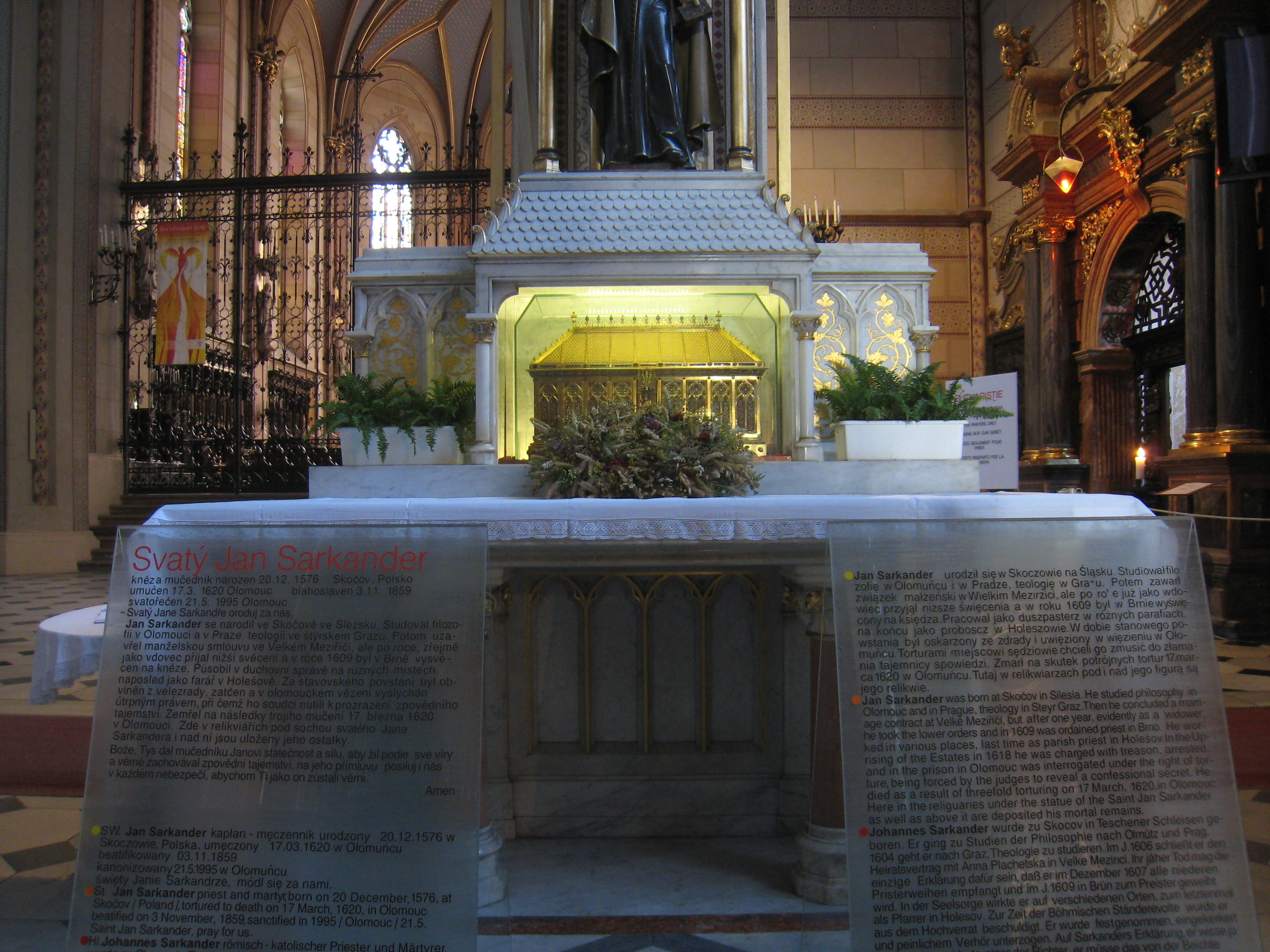
Relics of Sarkander in Olomouc

Jan Sarkander's relics lie in Saint Wenceslas Cathedral in Olomouc (Czech Republic).

A chapel dedicated to him stands at the top of Michael's Hill on the former site of the prison. The original torturing rack and Sarkander's gravestone are preserved here.
