= Stará Ves nad Ondřejnicí =

- Municipality
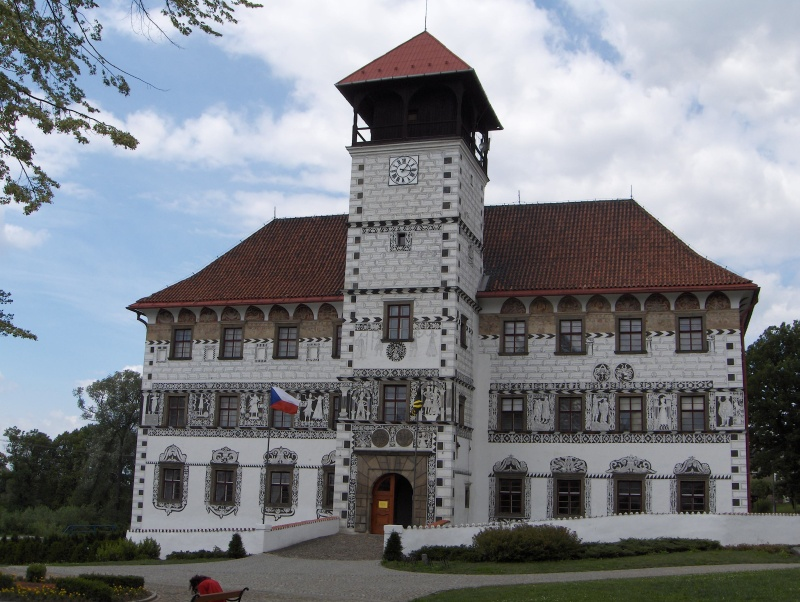
- Renaissance castle

- Flag Coat of arms

- Location in the Czech Republic
- Coordinates: 49°46′12″N 18°18′37″E
- Country: Czech Republic
- Region: Moravian-Silesian
- District: Ostrava-City
- First mentioned: 1267

Area
  - Total: 18.83 km^{2} (7.27 sq mi)
- Elevation: 240 m (790 ft)

Population (2026-01-01)
  - Total: 2,990
  - Density: 159/km^{2} (411/sq mi)
- Time zone: UTC+1 (CET)
  - Summer (DST): UTC+2 (CEST)
- Postal code: 739 23
- Website: www.staraves.cz

Stará Ves nad Ondřejnicí (German: Bruneswerde) is a municipality in Ostrava-City District in the Moravian-Silesian Region of the Czech Republic. It has about 3,000 inhabitants.

== Administrative division ==
Stará Ves nad Ondřejnicí consists of five municipal parts (in brackets population according to the 2021 census):

- Stará Ves (2,410)
- Košatka (343)

== Etymology ==
The name of the municipality means 'old village upon the Ondřejnice' in Czech.

== Geography ==
Stará Ves nad Ondřejnicí is located about 7 kilometres (4 mi) south of Ostrava. It lies on the border between the Moravian Gate and Moravian-Silesian Foothills. The Ondřejnice River flows through the Stará Ves village. It flows into the Oder, which flows along the northern municipal border. Another notable river is the Lubina, which flows through Košatka and then joins the Oder just outside the municipal territory. The northern part of the municipality lies within the Poodří Protected Landscape Area.

== History ==
The first written mention of Stará Ves is in the will of bishop Bruno von Schauenburg from 1267. The most important noble owners of the village were the Syrakovský of Pěrkov family. In the 16th century, they had built here a castle and a church. The development of the village ended with the Thirty Years' War. The Swedish army looted Stará Ves in 1643. During the war, the Prusinovský family acquired the village and owned it for almost 300 years.

== Demographics ==
Historical population

Year	Pop.	±%
1869	1,717	—
1880	1,893	+10.3%
1890	1,935	+2.2%
1900	2,231	+15.3%
1910	2,399	+7.5%

Year	Pop.	±%
1921	2,334	−2.7%
1930	2,621	+12.3%
1950	2,174	−17.1%
1961	2,349	+8.0%
1970	2,243	−4.5%

Year	Pop.	±%
1980	2,309	+2.9%
1991	2,380	+3.1%
2001	2,448	+2.9%
2011	2,559	+4.5%
2021	2,753	+7.6%

Source: Censuses

== Transport ==
The I/58 road from Ostrava to Rožnov pod Radhoštěm runs through the municipality.

== Sights ==
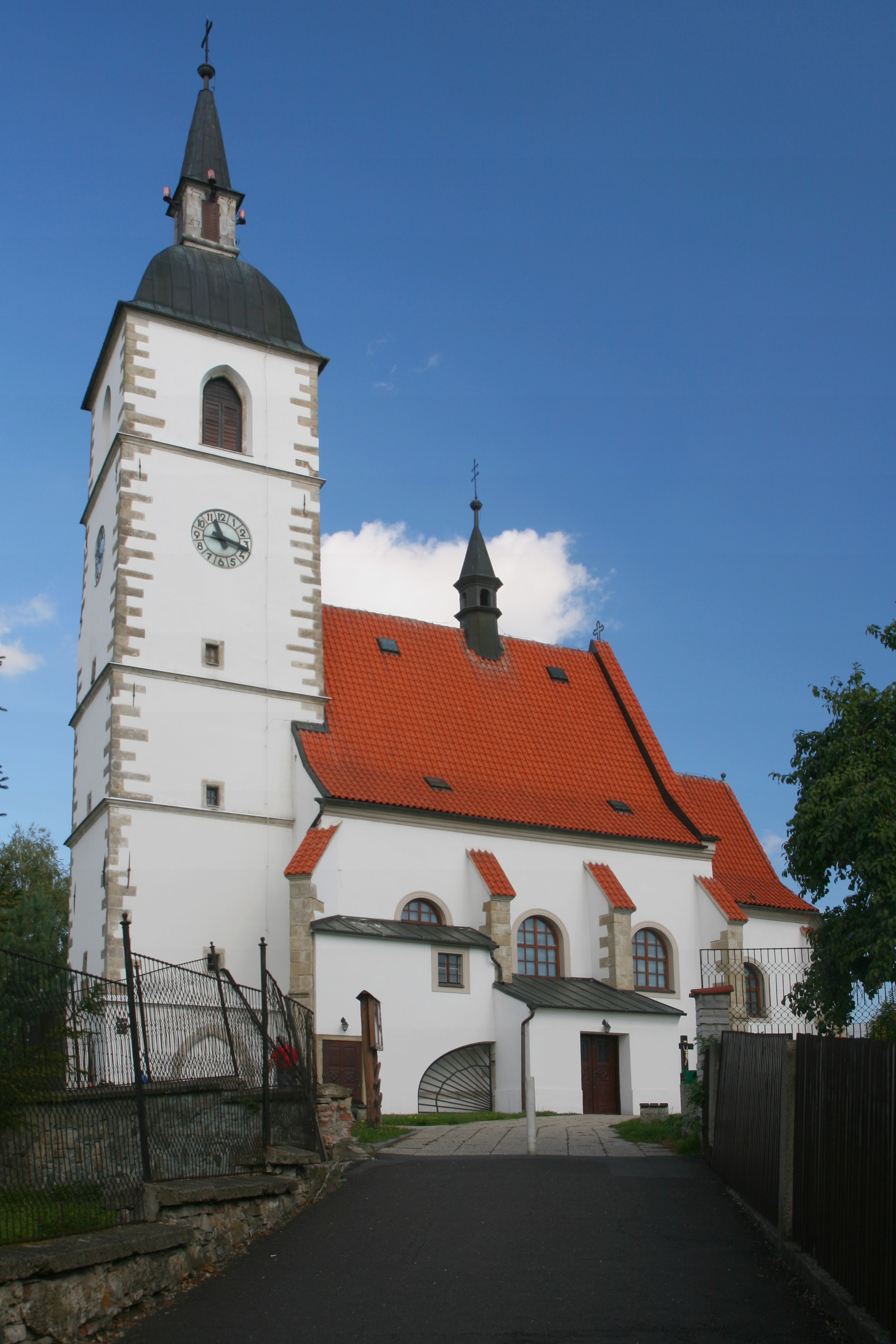
Church of Saint John the Baptist

The main landmark of Stará Ves nad Ondřejnicí is a Renaissance castle built in 1565–1570. It is a two-storey castle with a square floor plan, with a small inner courtyard decorated with open arcades and a tower. The castle is decorated by figural sgraffiti.

The Church of Saint John the Baptist was built in 1587–1589 and is the second most valuable building in the municipality. Near the church is a Baroque rectory.

== Twin towns – sister cities ==
Stará Ves nad Ondřejnicí is twinned with:

- Lipowa, Poland
- Raková, Slovakia
