= Lichnov (Nový Jičín District) =

- Municipality
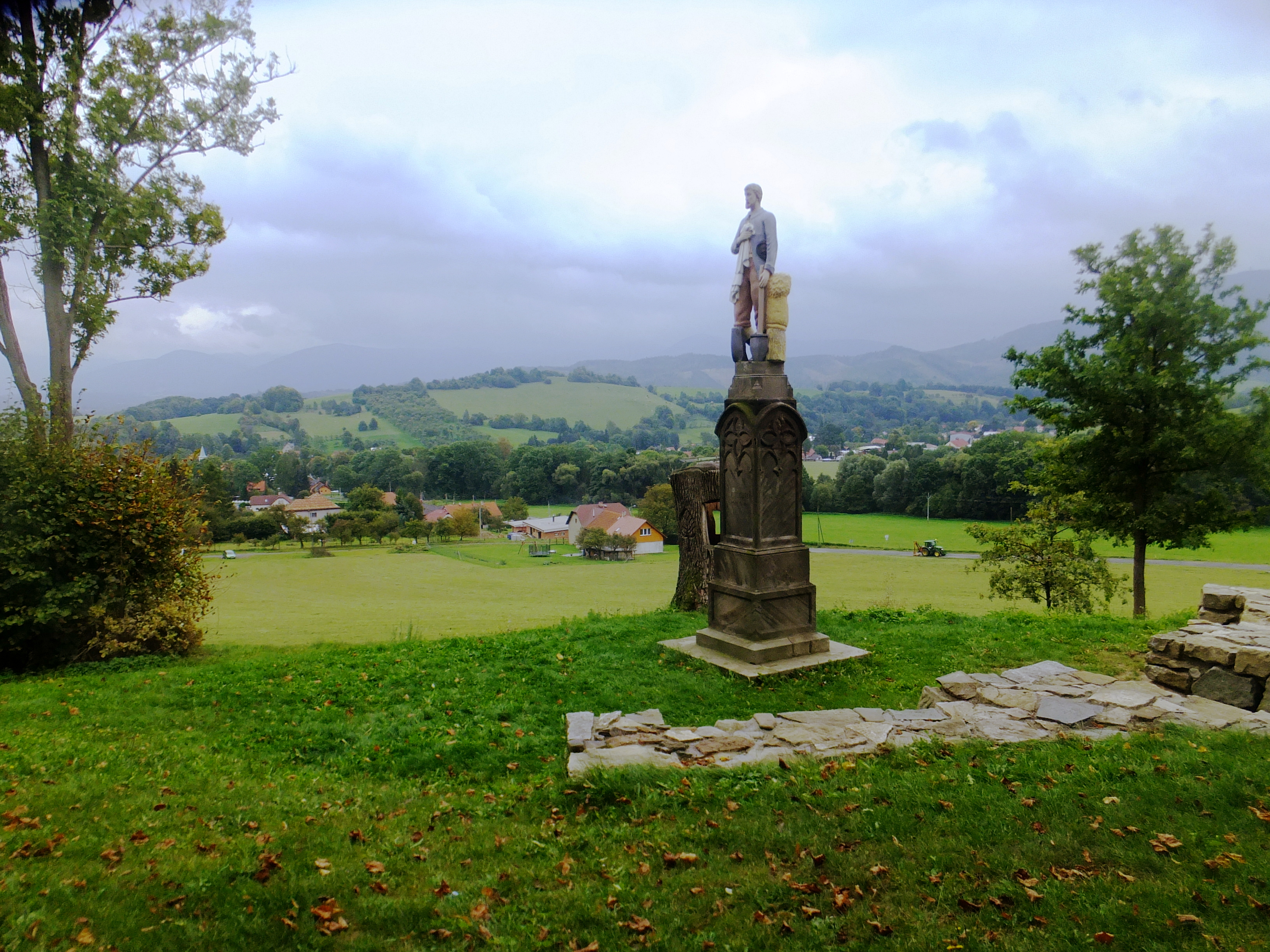
- View from the west

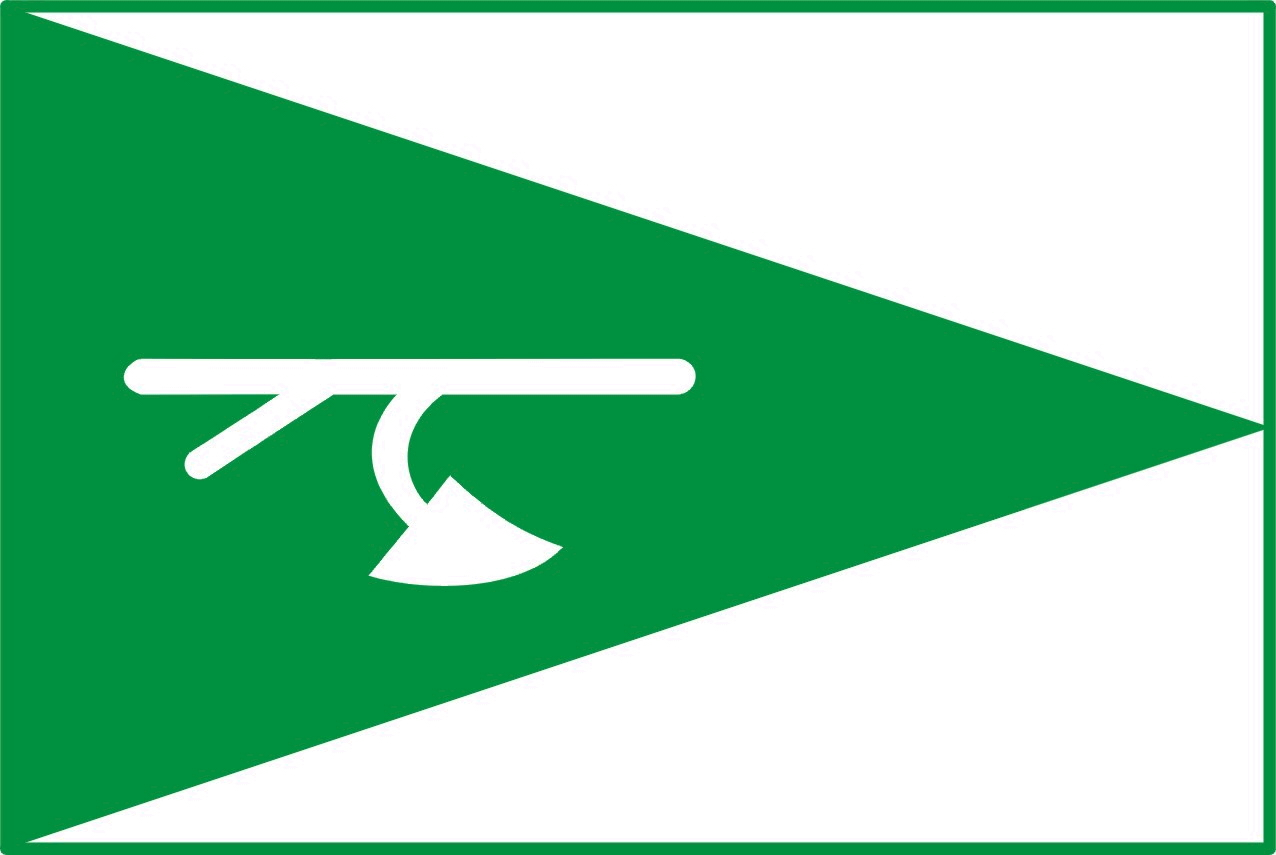
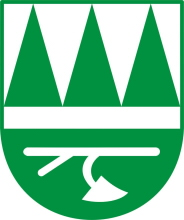
- Flag Coat of arms

- Location in the Czech Republic
- Coordinates: 49°33′51″N 18°10′8″E
- Country: Czech Republic
- Region: Moravian-Silesian
- District: Nový Jičín
- Founded: 1293

Area
  - Total: 12.10 km^{2} (4.67 sq mi)
- Elevation: 359 m (1,178 ft)

Population (2026-01-01)
  - Total: 1,604
  - Density: 132.6/km^{2} (343.3/sq mi)
- Time zone: UTC+1 (CET)
  - Summer (DST): UTC+2 (CEST)
- Postal code: 742 75
- Website: www.lichnov.cz

Lichnov (German: Lichnau) is a municipality and village in Nový Jičín District in the Moravian-Silesian Region of the Czech Republic. It has about 1,600 inhabitants.

== Etymology ==
The village was originally named Lichtenau ('light meadow') in German, referring to a light-filled place in dense vegetation. In the documents from the 16th century, the name was first transcribed into Czech as Lichtnov. From the 18th century onwards, the shortened form Lichnau was used in German, which led to the change of the Czech name to Lichnov.

== Geography ==
Lichnov is located about 12 kilometres (7 mi) east of Nový Jičín and 27 km (17 mi) south of Ostrava. It lies in the Moravian-Silesian Foothills. The highest point is the hill Červený kámen at 696 m (2,283 ft) above sea level. The Lubina River flows along the eastern municipal border. The stream Lichnovský potok flows across the municipality before it joins the Lubina just outside the territory of Lichnov.

== History ==
Lichnov was founded in 1293.

== Demographics ==
Historical population

Year	Pop.	±%
1869	1,175	—
1880	1,091	−7.1%
1890	1,187	+8.8%
1900	1,261	+6.2%
1910	1,387	+10.0%

Year	Pop.	±%
1921	1,344	−3.1%
1930	1,505	+12.0%
1950	1,454	−3.4%
1961	1,567	+7.8%
1970	1,437	−8.3%

Year	Pop.	±%
1980	1,393	−3.1%
1991	1,287	−7.6%
2001	1,317	+2.3%
2011	1,445	+9.7%
2021	1,513	+4.7%

Source: Censuses

== Transport ==
The I/58 road from Ostrava to Rožnov pod Radhoštěm runs along the eastern municipal border.

The railway line Valašské Meziříčí–Frýdlant nad Ostravicí passes through the southern part of the municipality, but there is no train station.

== Sport ==
Part of the annual Gracia–Orlová women's staged cycle race runs through the municipality.

== Sights ==
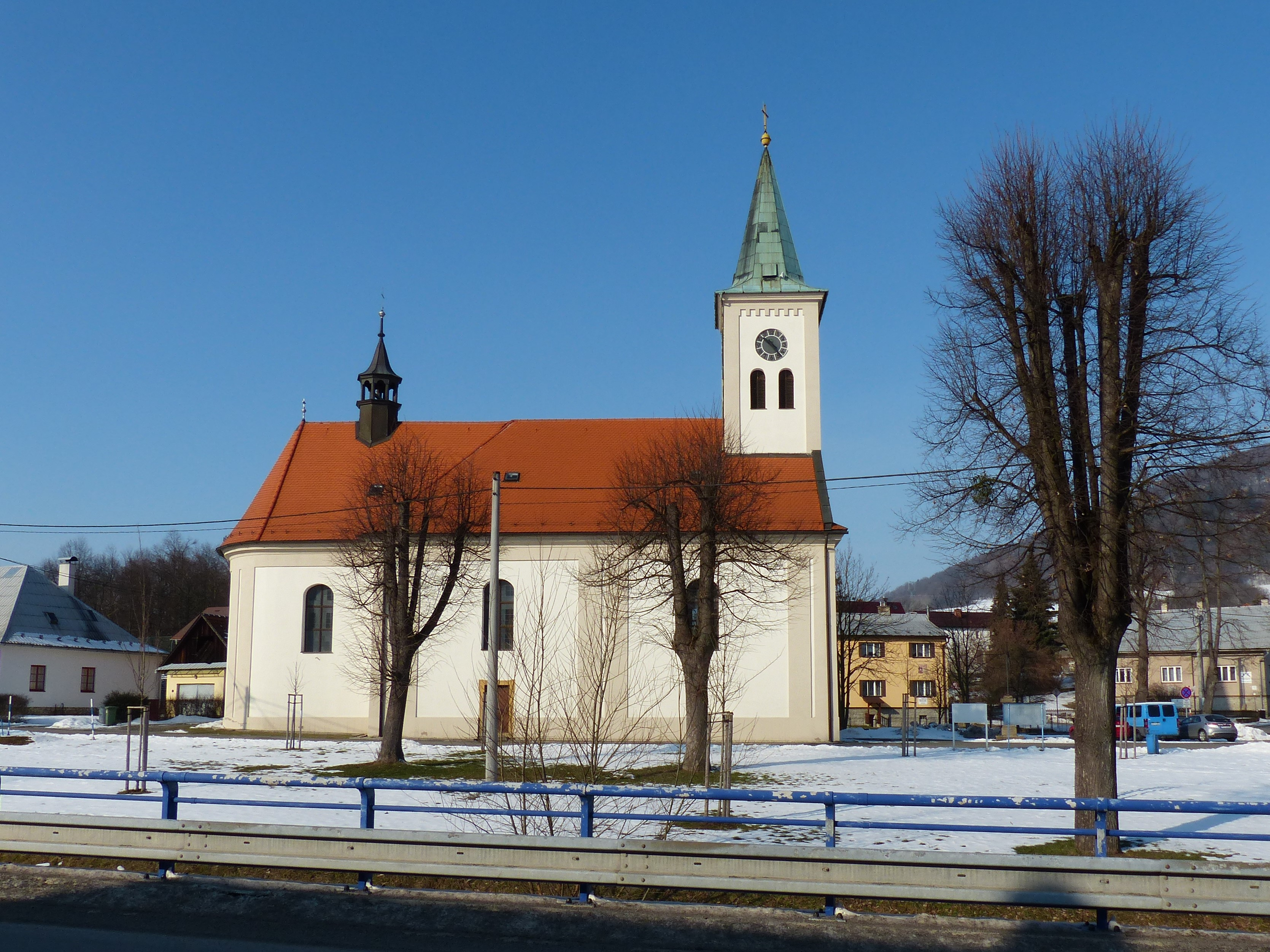
Church of Saints Peter and Paul

The main landmark of Lichnov is the Church of Saints Peter and Paul. It was built in the late Baroque style in 1794. In the second half of the 19th century, it was modified in the Historicist style.
