= Birthplace of Sigmund Freud =

Historical house in Příbor, Czech Republic

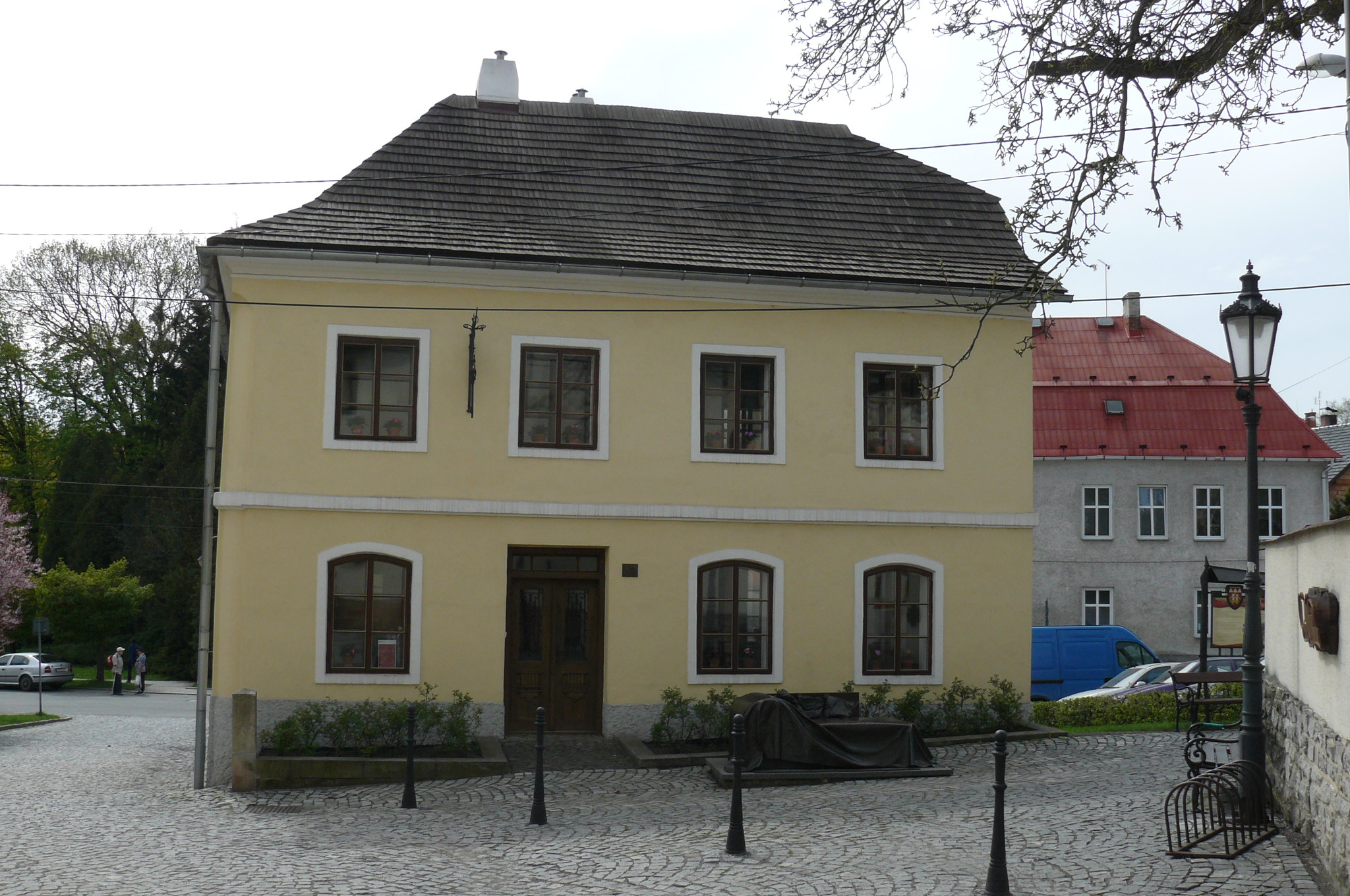
- Front view
- Established: 27 May 2006; 20 years ago
- Location: Příbor, Moravian-Silesian Region, Czech Republic
- Coordinates: 49°38′21.7″N 18°8′33.1″E
- Website: www.freudmuseum.cz

The Birthplace of Sigmund Freud (Czech: Rodný dům Sigmunda Freuda) is a historic building in Příbor, Moravian-Silesian Region, Czech Republic. It is the birthplace of the psychologist, neurologist, and psychoanalyst Sigmund Freud, who was born in 1856. He lived in this house with his family until he was three years old before moving elsewhere. The house was designated a cultural monument in 2005 and opened as a museum in 2006.

== History ==
The house was built in the first quarter of the 19th century at 117 Zámečnická Street. In the 1850s, the second floor, located above a blacksmith's shop on the first floor, was leased by the family of Sigmund Freud and his mother, Amalia Freud.

This house was the only building preserved during the demolition of the entire old Zámečnická Street in 1975.

This house was designated as a cultural monument in 2005. In 2006, it was purchased by the town of Příbor to be restored to its original 19th-century appearance in order to establish a museum honouring Sigmund Freud. The museum was officially opened on 27 May 2006, the 150th anniversary of Freud's birth, in the presence of his descendants and President Václav Klaus.
