= Tichá =

- Municipality
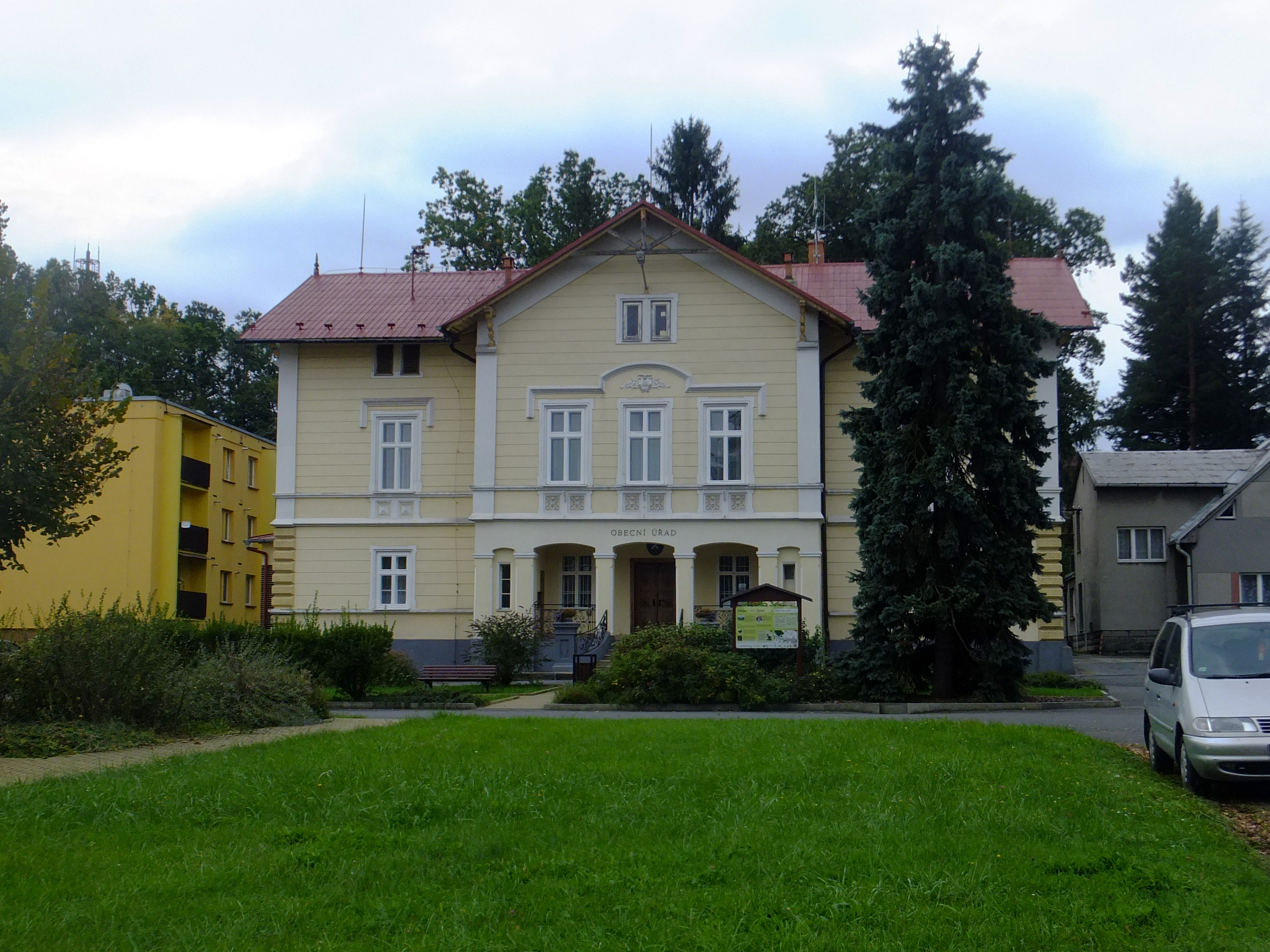
- Municipal office in the centre of Tichá

- Flag Coat of arms

- Location in the Czech Republic
- Coordinates: 49°34′12″N 18°13′17″E
- Country: Czech Republic
- Region: Moravian-Silesian
- District: Nový Jičín
- First mentioned: 1359

Area
  - Total: 16.45 km^{2} (6.35 sq mi)
- Elevation: 355 m (1,165 ft)

Population (2026-01-01)
  - Total: 2,002
  - Density: 121.7/km^{2} (315.2/sq mi)
- Time zone: UTC+1 (CET)
  - Summer (DST): UTC+2 (CEST)
- Postal code: 742 74
- Website: www.ticha.cz

Tichá is a municipality and village in Nový Jičín District in the Moravian-Silesian Region of the Czech Republic. It has about 2,000 inhabitants.

== Etymology ==
The name literally means 'silent' in Czech.

== Geography ==
Tichá is located about 15 kilometres (9 mi) east of Nový Jičín and 25 km (16 mi) south of Ostrava. It lies in the Moravian-Silesian Foothills. The highest point is the hill Tichavská hůrka at 543 m (1,781 ft) above sea level. The Tichávka Stream flows through the municipality. The Lubina River flows along the western municipal border.

== History ==
The first written mention of Tichá is from 1359.

== Demographics ==
Historical population

Year	Pop.	±%
1869	1,562	—
1880	1,474	−5.6%
1890	1,430	−3.0%
1900	1,463	+2.3%
1910	1,553	+6.2%

Year	Pop.	±%
1921	1,487	−4.2%
1930	1,669	+12.2%
1950	1,571	−5.9%
1961	1,695	+7.9%
1970	1,565	−7.7%

Year	Pop.	±%
1980	1,511	−3.5%
1991	1,493	−1.2%
2001	1,557	+4.3%
2011	1,690	+8.5%
2021	1,813	+7.3%

Source: Censuses

== Transport ==
The I/58 road from Ostrava to Rožnov pod Radhoštěm runs through the western part of the municipality.

== Sights ==
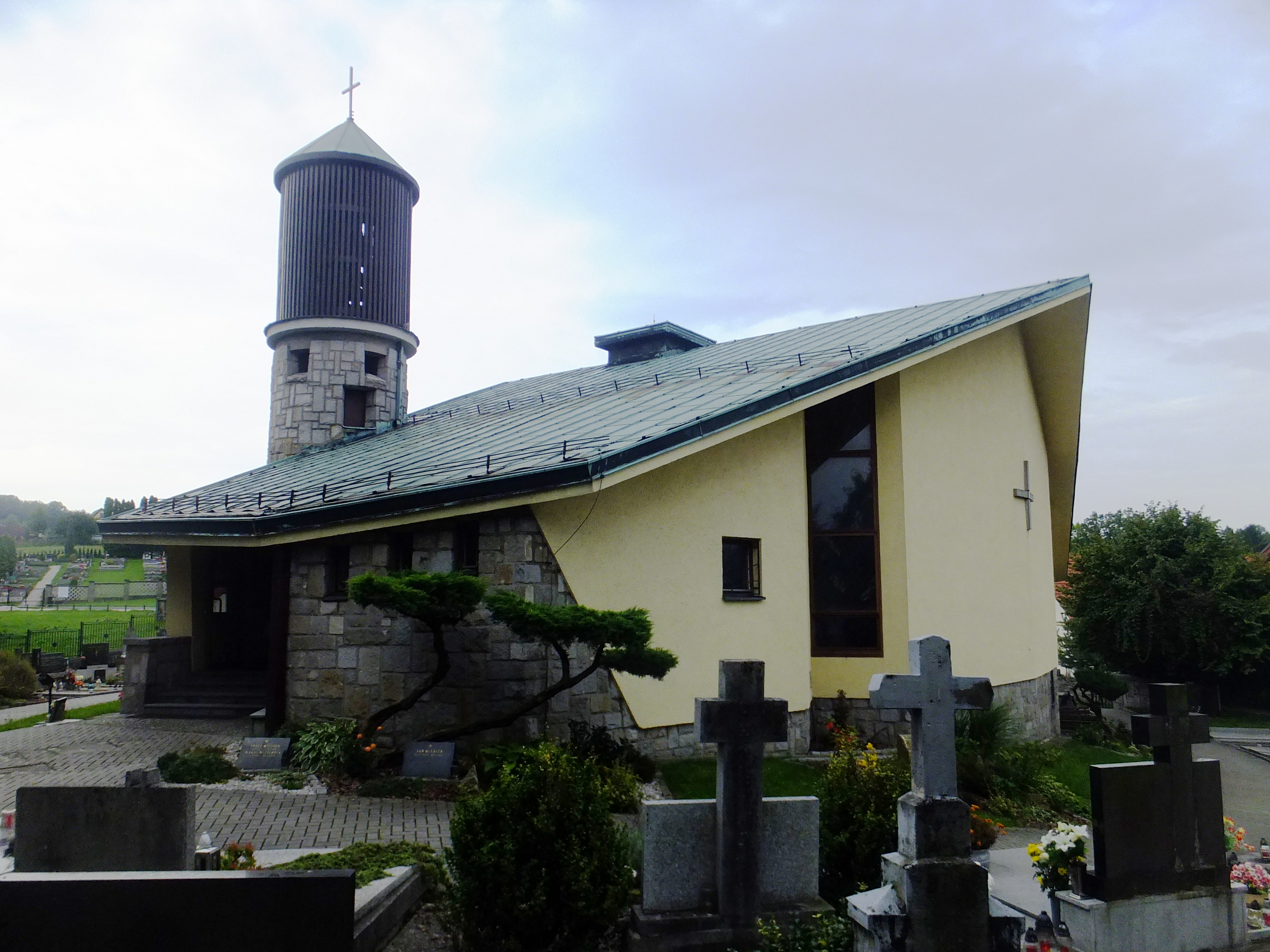
Church of Saint Nicholas

The main landmark of Tichá is the Church of Saint Nicholas. It was originally a wooden church from the first quarter of the 16th century, but it burned down in 1964 after being struck by lightning. In 1976, the current modern church was built on its site.

Among the protected cultural monuments in the municipality are a sandstone column shrine from 1647, a late Baroque sandstone cross from 1770, and the Smuteční píseň sculptural group from 1959.
