= Frenštát pod Radhoštěm =

- Town
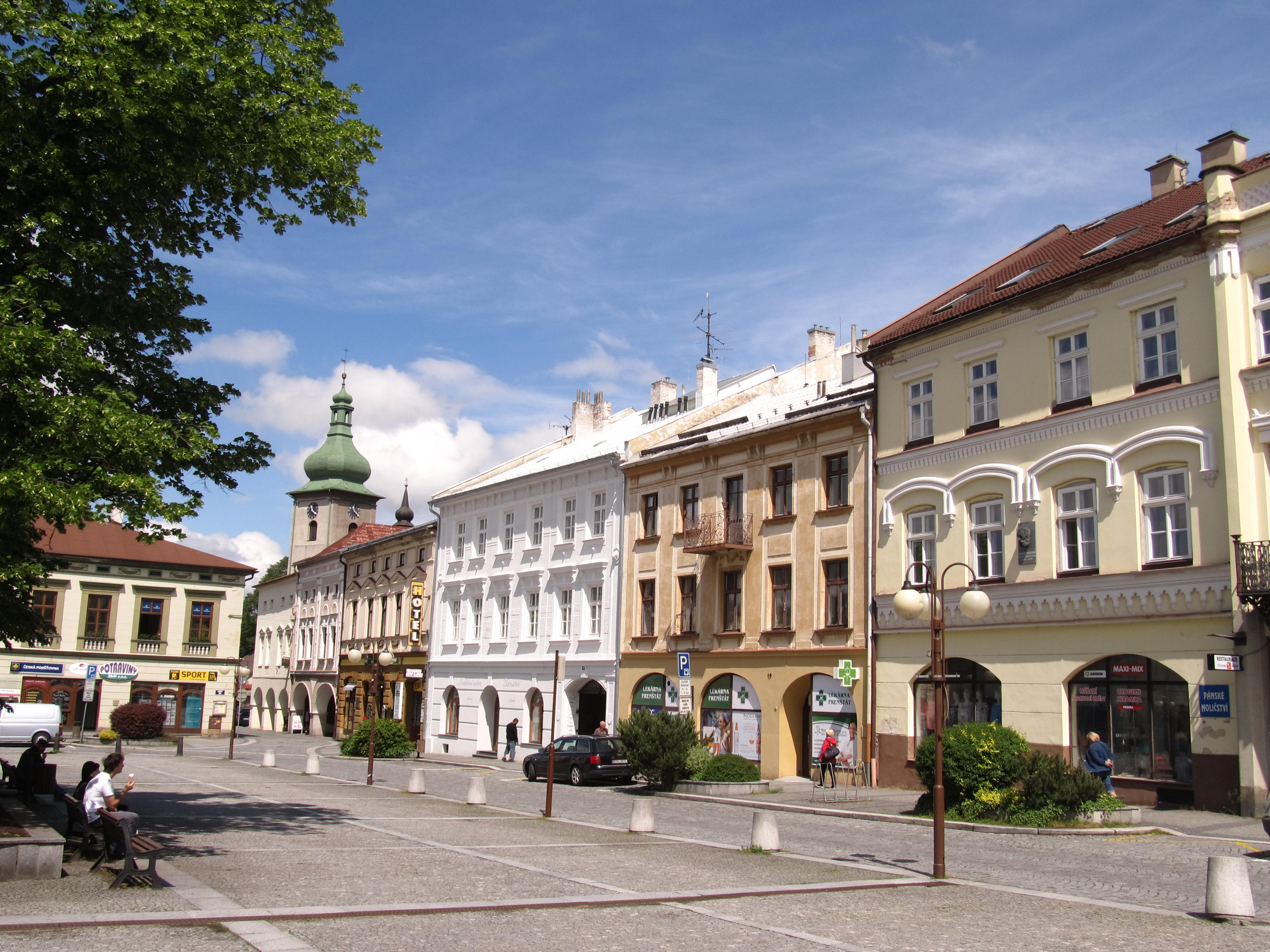
- The square Náměstí Míru

- Flag Coat of arms

- Location in the Czech Republic
- Coordinates: 49°32′54″N 18°12′39″E
- Country: Czech Republic
- Region: Moravian-Silesian
- District: Nový Jičín
- First mentioned: 1382

Government
  - Mayor: Jan Rejman

Area
  - Total: 11.43 km^{2} (4.41 sq mi)
- Elevation: 401 m (1,316 ft)

Population (2026-01-01)
  - Total: 10,495
  - Density: 918.2/km^{2} (2,378/sq mi)
- Time zone: UTC+1 (CET)
  - Summer (DST): UTC+2 (CEST)
- Postal code: 744 01
- Website: www.mufrenstat.cz

Frenštát pod Radhoštěm (Czech pronunciation: [ˈfrɛnʃtaːt ˈpod radɦoʃcɛm]; German: Frankstadt) is a town in Nový Jičín District in the Moravian-Silesian Region of the Czech Republic. It has about 10,000 inhabitants. The town is located on the Lubina River, on the border between the Moravian-Silesian Foothills and the mountain range Moravian-Silesian Beskids.

Frenštát pod Radhoštěm was founded at the turn of the 13th and 14th centuries. The historic town centre is well preserved and is protected as an urban monument zone.

== Geography ==
Frenštát pod Radhoštěm is located about 15 kilometres (9 mi) southeast of Nový Jičín and 27 km (17 mi) south of Ostrava. It lies mostly in the Moravian-Silesian Foothills. The western part of the municipal territory extends into the Moravian-Silesian Beskids mountain range and contains the highest point of Frenštát pod Radhoštěm, the hill Vlčina at 532 m (1,745 ft) above sea level. The mountain of Radhošť, contained in the name of the town, is located south of the town (outside the municipal territory). The town is situated at the confluence of the Lubina River and Lomná Stream.

=== Climate ===
Frenštát pod Radhoštěm's climate is classified as humid continental climate (Köppen: Dfb; Trewartha: Dcbo). Among them, the annual average temperature is 8.5 °C (47.3 °F), the hottest month in July is 18.3 °C (64.9 °F), and the coldest month is −1.5 °C (29.3 °F) in January. The annual precipitation is 1,002.6 millimetres (39.47 in), of which July is the wettest with 139.5 millimetres (5.49 in), while January is the driest with only 50.5 millimetres (1.99 in). The extreme temperature throughout the year ranged from −31.0 °C (−23.8 °F) on 1 February 1956 to 35.6 °C (96.1 °F) on 28 August 1992.

Climate data for Frenštát pod Radhoštěm, 1991–2020 normals, extremes 1903–present
| Month | Jan | Feb | Mar | Apr | May | Jun | Jul | Aug | Sep | Oct | Nov | Dec | Year |
|---|---|---|---|---|---|---|---|---|---|---|---|---|---|
| Record high °C (°F) | 18.1 (64.6) | 19.0 (66.2) | 23.0 (73.4) | 28.0 (82.4) | 31.5 (88.7) | 34.6 (94.3) | 35.3 (95.5) | 35.6 (96.1) | 31.8 (89.2) | 27.1 (80.8) | 21.1 (70.0) | 16.6 (61.9) | 35.6 (96.1) |
| Mean daily maximum °C (°F) | 1.5 (34.7) | 3.2 (37.8) | 7.5 (45.5) | 14.0 (57.2) | 18.6 (65.5) | 22.2 (72.0) | 24.3 (75.7) | 24.1 (75.4) | 18.5 (65.3) | 13.2 (55.8) | 7.6 (45.7) | 2.6 (36.7) | 13.1 (55.6) |
| Daily mean °C (°F) | −1.5 (29.3) | −0.3 (31.5) | 3.0 (37.4) | 8.4 (47.1) | 12.9 (55.2) | 16.6 (61.9) | 18.3 (64.9) | 17.8 (64.0) | 13.1 (55.6) | 8.8 (47.8) | 4.4 (39.9) | −0.1 (31.8) | 8.5 (47.3) |
| Mean daily minimum °C (°F) | −4.8 (23.4) | −4.1 (24.6) | −1.2 (29.8) | 2.6 (36.7) | 6.9 (44.4) | 10.5 (50.9) | 12.2 (54.0) | 11.8 (53.2) | 8.4 (47.1) | 4.8 (40.6) | 1.2 (34.2) | −3.4 (25.9) | 3.8 (38.8) |
| Record low °C (°F) | −28.5 (−19.3) | −31.0 (−23.8) | −25.4 (−13.7) | −12.9 (8.8) | −5.0 (23.0) | −0.6 (30.9) | 2.5 (36.5) | 1.8 (35.2) | −4.2 (24.4) | −9.7 (14.5) | −23.3 (−9.9) | −28.4 (−19.1) | −31.0 (−23.8) |
| Average precipitation mm (inches) | 50.5 (1.99) | 53.1 (2.09) | 63.7 (2.51) | 68.7 (2.70) | 117.5 (4.63) | 118.5 (4.67) | 139.5 (5.49) | 96.8 (3.81) | 104.3 (4.11) | 74.5 (2.93) | 60.7 (2.39) | 55.1 (2.17) | 1,002.6 (39.47) |
| Average snowfall cm (inches) | 37.1 (14.6) | 40.2 (15.8) | 23.9 (9.4) | 6.7 (2.6) | 0.0 (0.0) | 0.0 (0.0) | 0.0 (0.0) | 0.0 (0.0) | trace | 1.8 (0.7) | 17.1 (6.7) | 34.2 (13.5) | 161.0 (63.4) |
| Average relative humidity (%) | 82.9 | 79.5 | 76.5 | 70.7 | 73.6 | 75.0 | 75.1 | 76.7 | 81.7 | 81.6 | 81.9 | 82.9 | 78.2 |
| Mean monthly sunshine hours | 43.3 | 66.1 | 122.6 | 174.3 | 159.6 | 196.0 | 224.6 | 206.8 | 136.0 | 108.3 | 63.2 | 43.5 | 1,544.2 |
Source: Czech Hydrometeorological Institute

== History ==
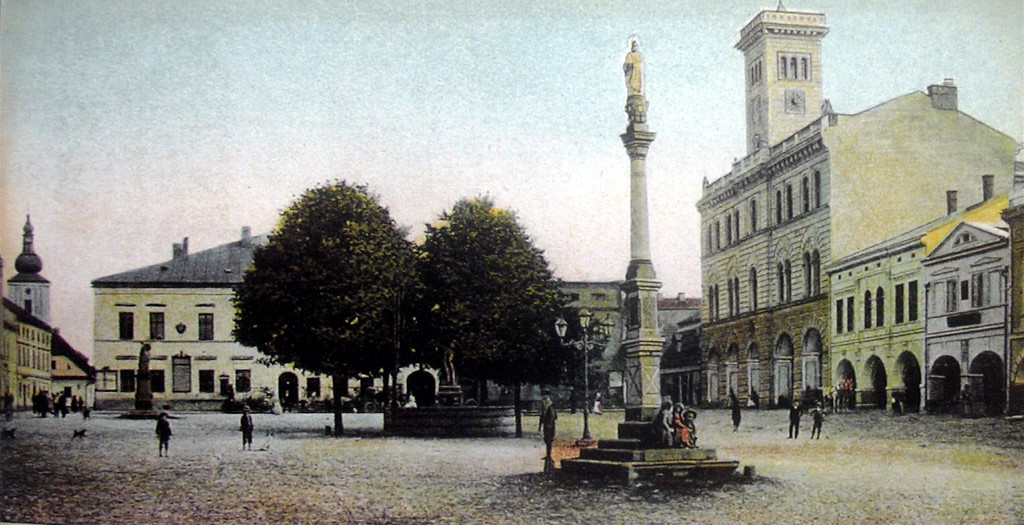
Frenštát pod Radhoštěm in 1909

The first written mention of Frenštát is from 1382. It was probably founded during the colonisation between 1293 and 1316. In 1473, it was first referred to as a market town. In the 16th century, it became a prosperous market town with developed trade and handicrafts.

The Thirty Years' War affected the town severely as it was burned down in 1626, and occupied by the Swedes in 1646. The plague epidemic also affected Frenštát. In the 17th century, the economy grew, possibly due to being colonised by the Wallachians. In 1781, Frenštát was promoted to a town.

In the second half of the 19th century, the industrialisation occurred. Weaving switched to mechanical factory production. Other important industries were dyeing, hosiery and the production of bentwood furniture. The development was supported by the opening of the railway in 1888. In 1921, Frenštát was renamed Frenštát pod Radhoštěm. The development ended with World War II as the town was occupied by the Axis, but was liberated on 6 May 1945. After the war there was an extensive housing construction.

== Demographics ==
Historical population

| Year | Pop. | ±% |
|---|---|---|
| 1869 | 6,563 | — |
| 1880 | 6,107 | −6.9% |
| 1890 | 5,767 | −5.6% |
| 1900 | 5,757 | −0.2% |
| 1910 | 6,178 | +7.3% |

| Year | Pop. | ±% |
|---|---|---|
| 1921 | 5,432 | −12.1% |
| 1930 | 5,691 | +4.8% |
| 1950 | 6,348 | +11.5% |
| 1961 | 7,754 | +22.1% |
| 1970 | 8,582 | +10.7% |

| Year | Pop. | ±% |
|---|---|---|
| 1980 | 9,853 | +14.8% |
| 1991 | 11,166 | +13.3% |
| 2001 | 11,361 | +1.7% |
| 2011 | 10,915 | −3.9% |
| 2021 | 10,576 | −3.1% |

Source: Censuses

== Transport ==
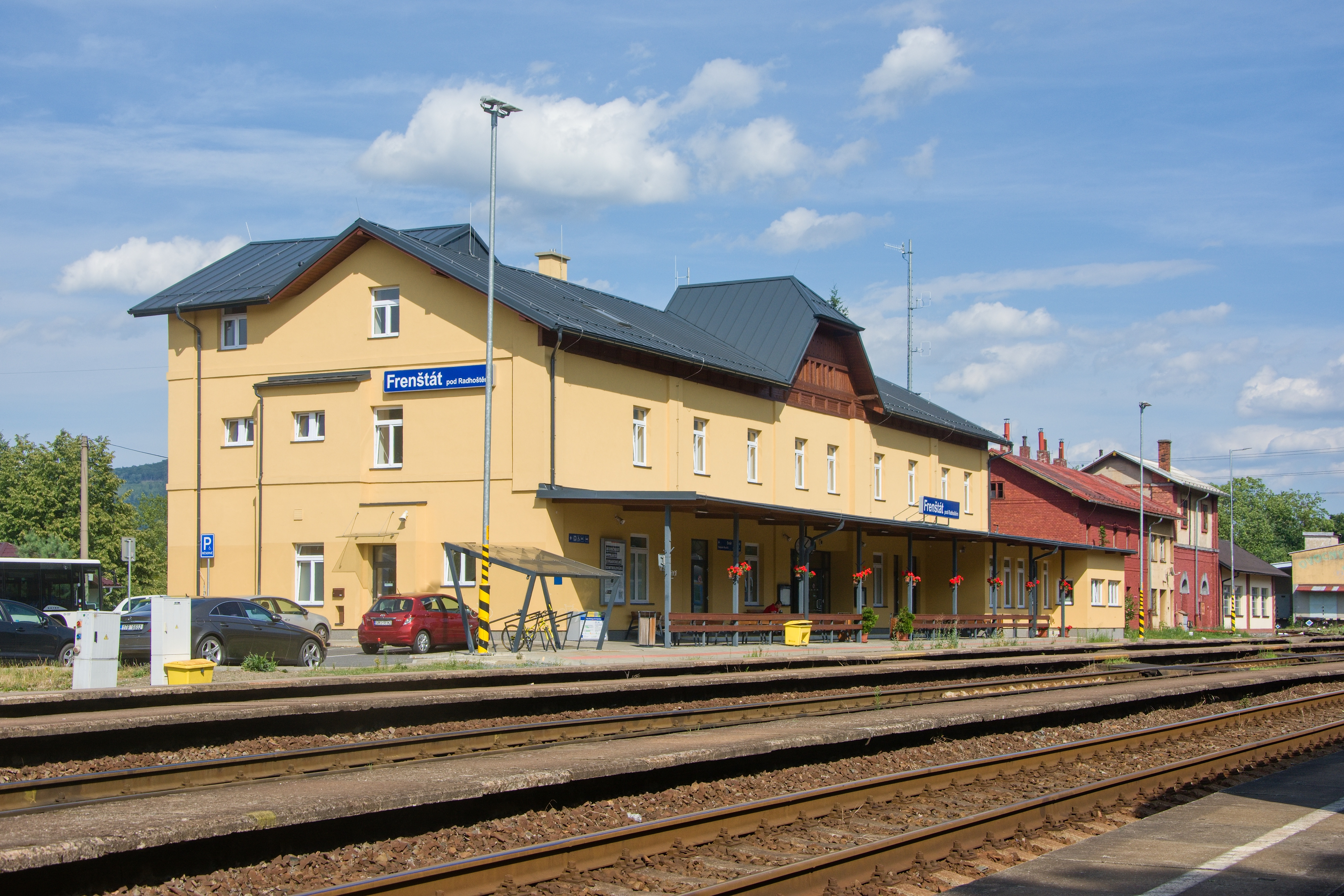
Train station

The I/58 road from Ostrava to Rožnov pod Radhoštěm passes through the town.

Frenštát pod Radhoštěm is located on the railway lines Ostrava–Frenštát pod Radhoštěm and Valašské Meziříčí–Frýdlant nad Ostravicí.

== Sport ==
Frenštát pod Radhoštěm is known as a ski centre. There is a complex with four ski jumps.

Frenštát pod Radhoštěm is home to the football team SK Beskyd Frenštát pod Radhoštěm, which competes in lower amateur tiers.

== Sights ==
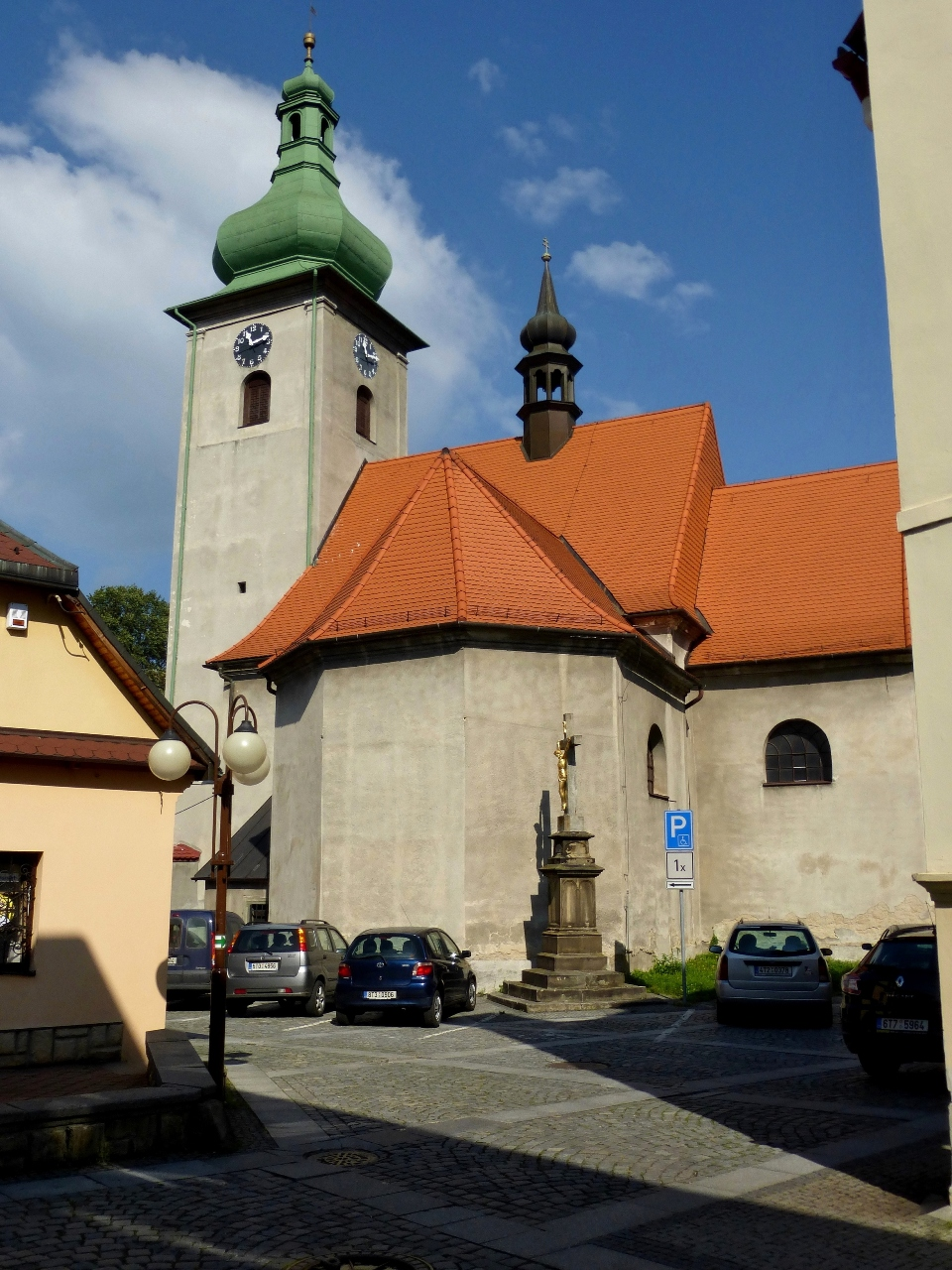
Church of Saint Martin

The town square is lined by preserved burgher houses. The main landmark of the square is the two-storey Neorenaissance town hall. It was built in the Italianising spirit in 1889–1891 on the site of an older town hall from 1796, and has an accessible tower. The interior is decorated by several valuable sculptures, including the original of the sculpture of the Slavic god Radegast, created by Albin Polasek in 1929 and originally placed on Radhošť.

The Church of Saint Martin was built in the early Baroque style in 1661. The Baroque chapels of St. Barbara and St. John of Nepomuk were added in around 1740.

The boys' middle-class school from 1876 was the second Czech school in Moravia. Today the building is a cultural monument and houses the town museum.

A technical monument is a fruit dryer built according to the design of Dušan Jurkovič in 1899.

== Notable people ==
- Albin Polasek (1879–1965), Czech-American sculptor and educator
- Bohuslav Fiala (1890–1964), brigadier general
- Břetislav Bartoš (1893–1926), painter
- Záviš Kalandra (1902–1950), historian and theorist
- Zdeněk Parma (1925–2006), alpine skier
- Ladislav Adamec (1926–2007), politician, Prime Minister of Czechoslovakia in 1988–1989
- Jiří Raška (1941–2012), ski jumper, Olympic winner
- Karel Loprais (1949–2021), rally raid driver; lived here
- Jiří Parma (born 1963), ski jumper
- Iveta Bartošová (1966–2014), singer; grew up here

== Twin towns – sister cities ==
Frenštát pod Radhoštěm is twinned with:

- Harrachov, Czech Republic
- Krásno nad Kysucou, Slovakia
- La Grange, United States
- Ustroń, Poland

== Gallery ==
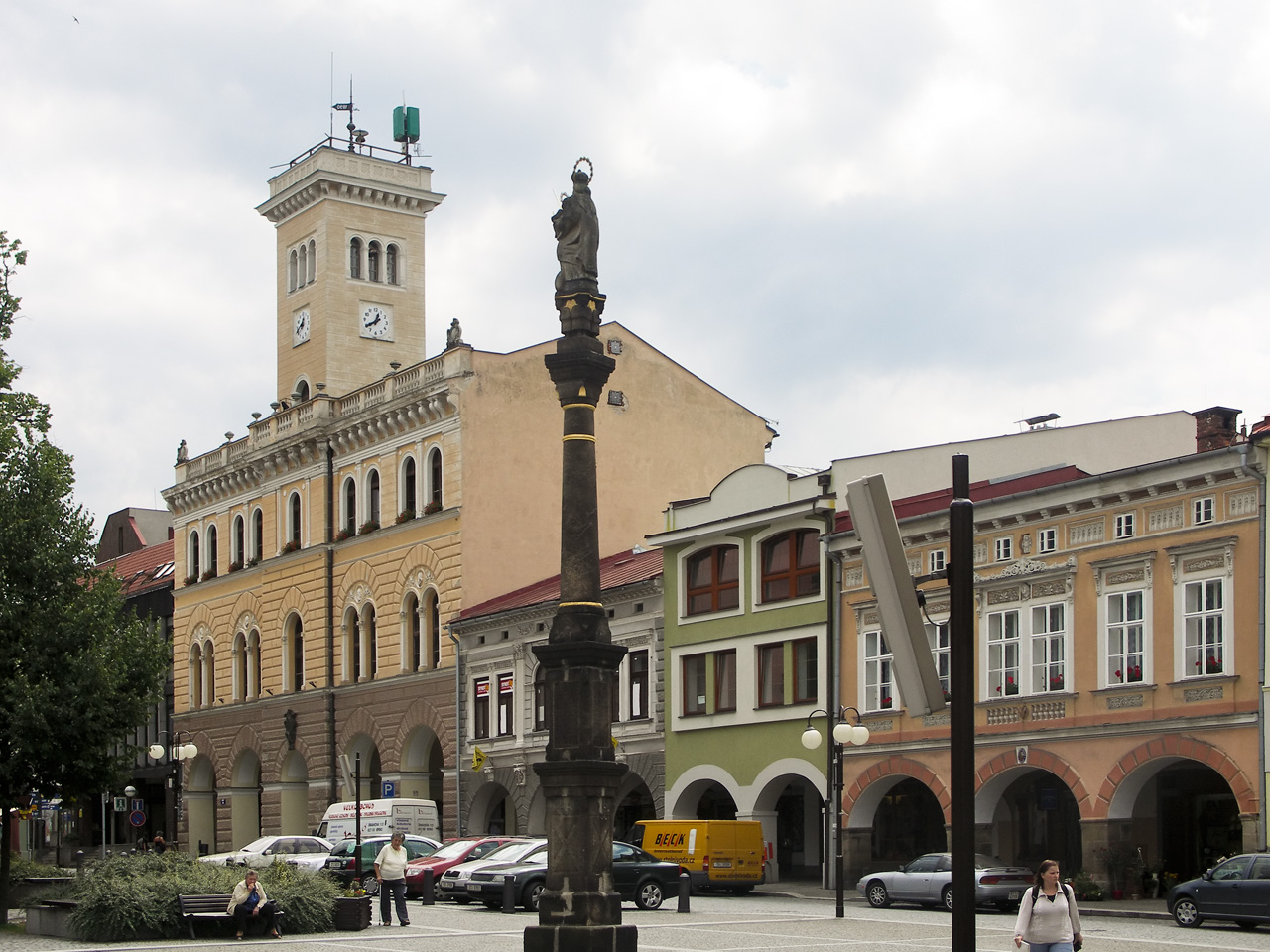
Town hall and Marian column at the square Náměstí Míru

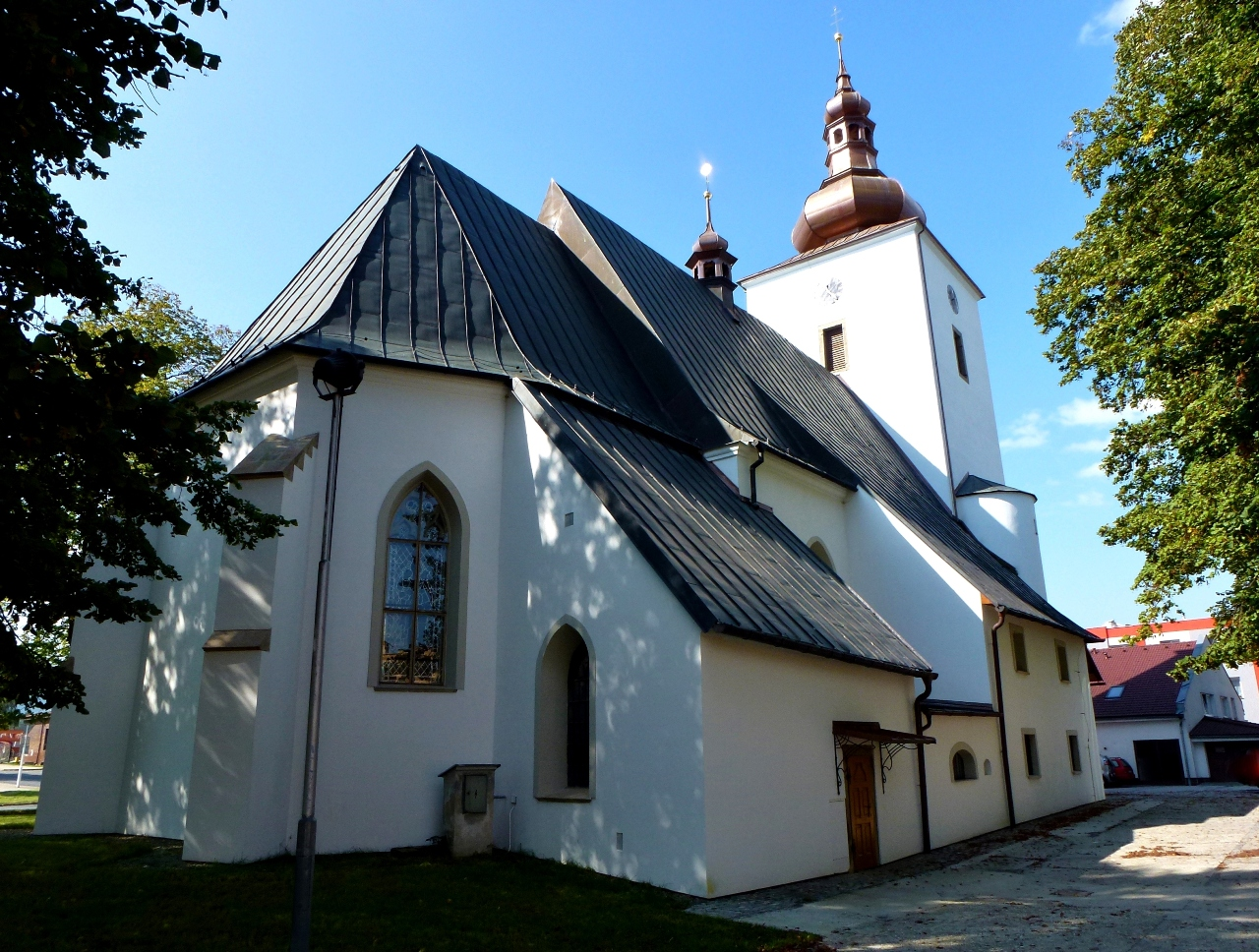
Church of Saint John the Baptist
