= Jistebník =

- Municipality
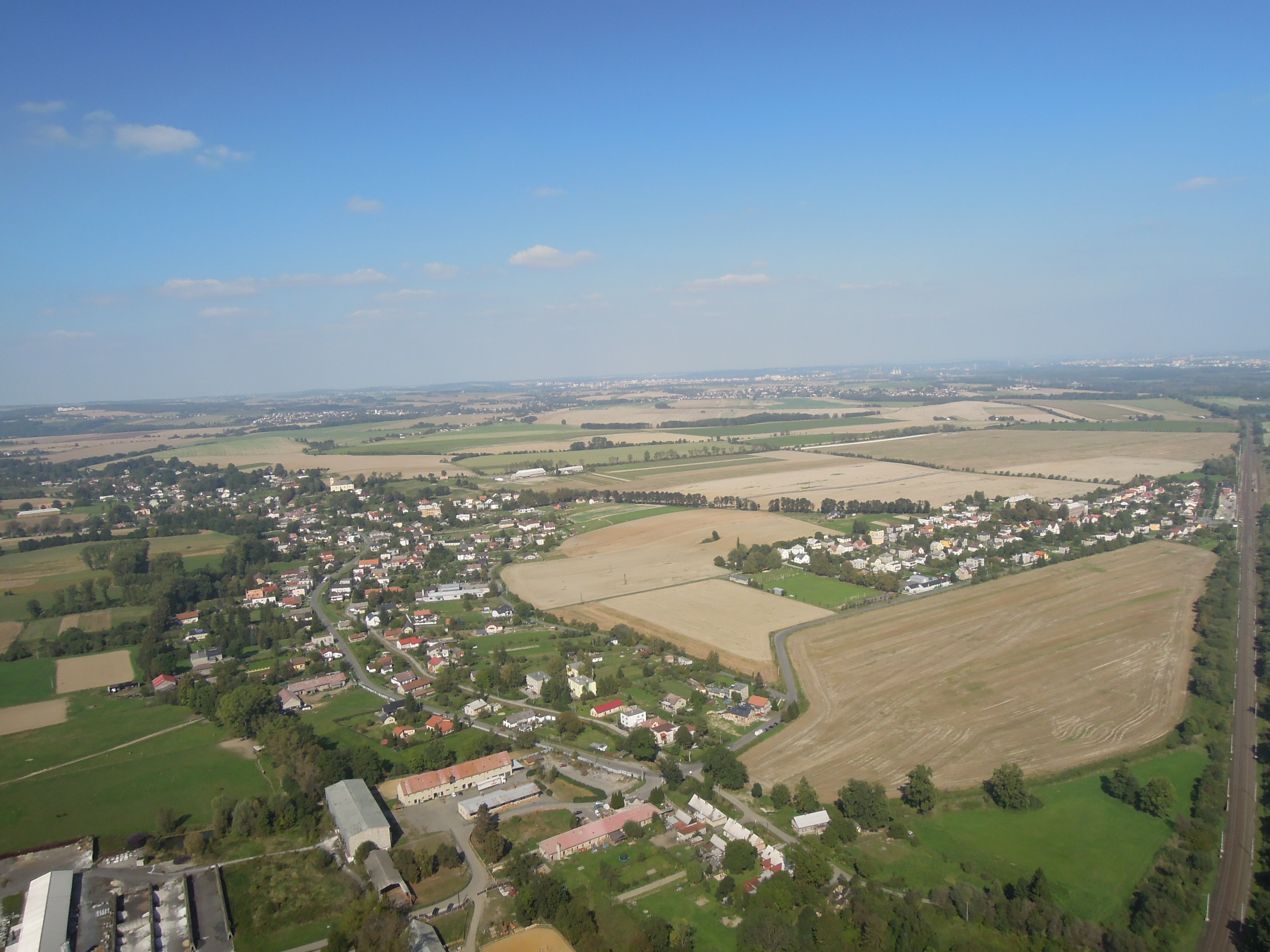
- Aerial view

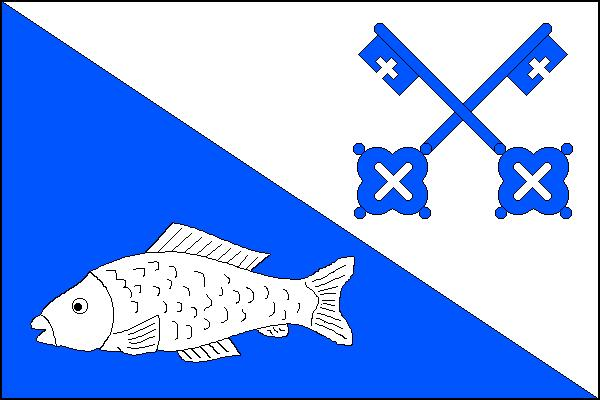
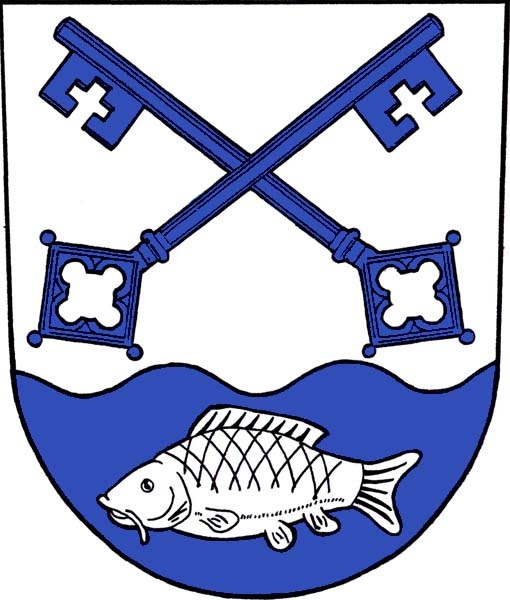
- Flag Coat of arms

- Location in the Czech Republic
- Coordinates: 49°45′14″N 18°7′50″E
- Country: Czech Republic
- Region: Moravian-Silesian
- District: Nový Jičín
- First mentioned: 1373

Area
  - Total: 15.85 km^{2} (6.12 sq mi)
- Elevation: 238 m (781 ft)

Population (2026-01-01)
  - Total: 1,814
  - Density: 114.4/km^{2} (296.4/sq mi)
- Time zone: UTC+1 (CET)
  - Summer (DST): UTC+2 (CEST)
- Postal code: 742 82
- Website: www.jistebnik.cz

Jistebník (German: Stiebnig) is a municipality and village in Nový Jičín District in the Moravian-Silesian Region of the Czech Republic. It has about 1,800 inhabitants.

== History ==
The first written mention of Jistebník is from 1373.

== Demographics ==
Historical population
Year	Pop.	±%
1869	1,307	—
1880	1,310	+0.2%
1890	1,384	+5.6%
1900	1,460	+5.5%
1910	1,659	+13.6%
1921	1,821	+9.8%
1930	2,222	+22.0%
1950	1,600	−28.0%
1961	1,711	+6.9%
1970	1,561	−8.8%
1980	1,517	−2.8%
1991	1,456	−4.0%
2001	1,463	+0.5%
2011	1,484	+1.4%
2021	1,622	+9.3%
Source: Censuses
