= Petřvald (Nový Jičín District) =

- Municipality
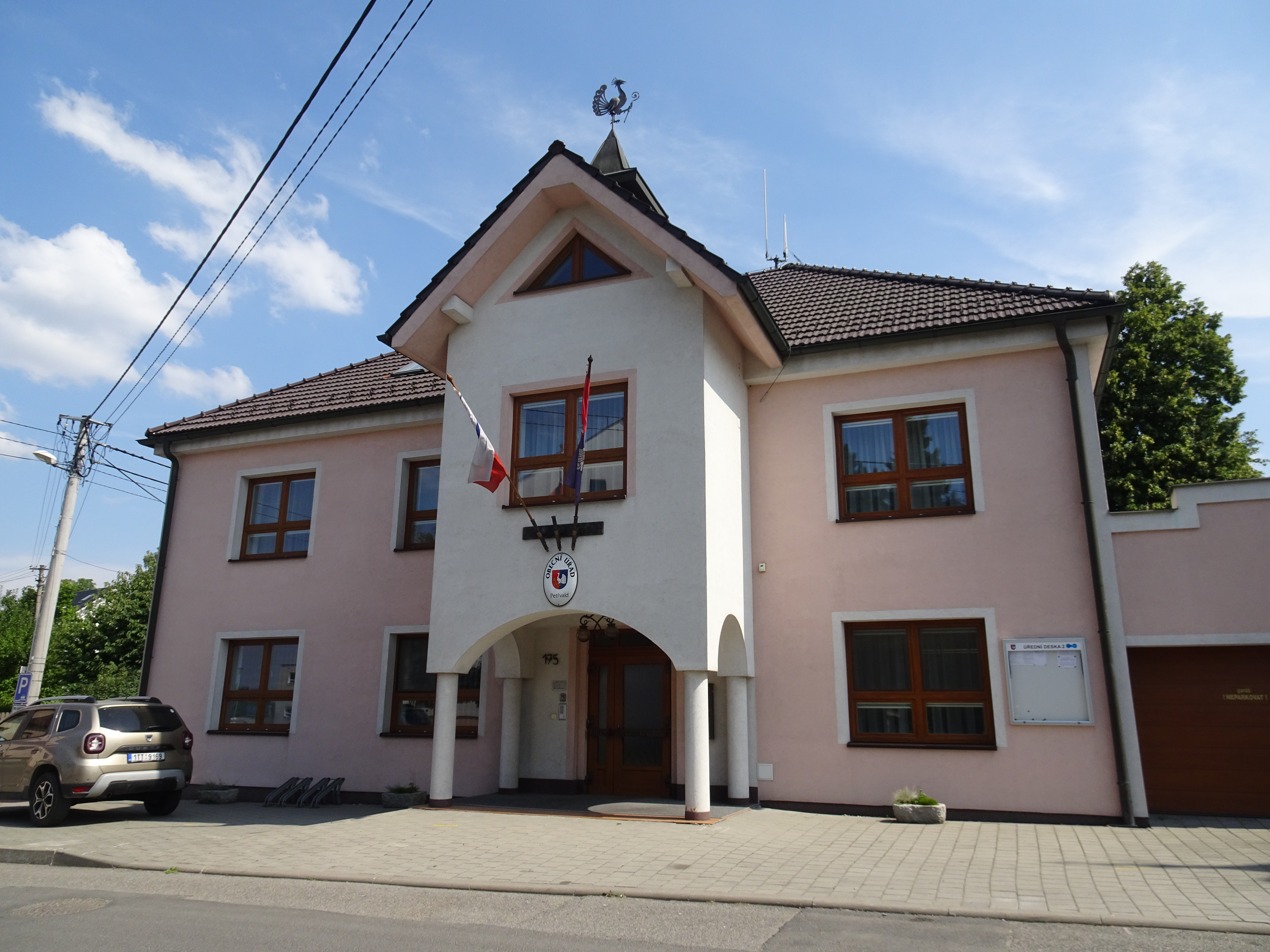
- Municipal office

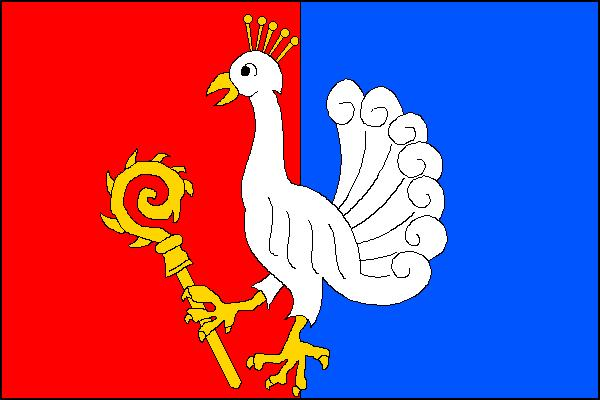
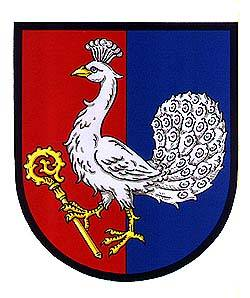
- Flag Coat of arms

- Location in the Czech Republic
- Coordinates: 49°42′31″N 18°9′26″E
- Country: Czech Republic
- Region: Moravian-Silesian
- District: Nový Jičín
- First mentioned: 1267

Area
  - Total: 12.51 km^{2} (4.83 sq mi)
- Elevation: 233 m (764 ft)

Population (2026-01-01)
  - Total: 1,728
  - Density: 138.1/km^{2} (357.8/sq mi)
- Time zone: UTC+1 (CET)
  - Summer (DST): UTC+2 (CEST)
- Postal code: 742 60
- Website: www.petrvaldobec.cz

Petřvald (German: Gross Peterswald) is a municipality and village in Nový Jičín District in the Moravian-Silesian Region of the Czech Republic. It has about 1,700 inhabitants.

== Administrative division ==
Petřvald consists of two municipal parts (in brackets population according to the 2021 census):

- Petřvald 1-Petřvald (1,398)
- Petřvald 2-Petřvaldík (252)

== History ==
The first written mention of Petřvald is from 1267.

== Demographics ==
Historical population
Year	Pop.	±%
1869	1,444	—
1880	1,430	−1.0%
1890	1,595	+11.5%
1900	1,646	+3.2%
1910	1,795	+9.1%
1921	1,634	−9.0%
1930	1,717	+5.1%
1950	1,464	−14.7%
1961	1,635	+11.7%
1970	1,639	+0.2%
1980	1,710	+4.3%
1991	1,727	+1.0%
2001	1,727	+0.0%
2011	1,761	+2.0%
2021	1,650	−6.3%
Source: Censuses
