= Bílá (Frýdek-Místek District) =

- Municipality
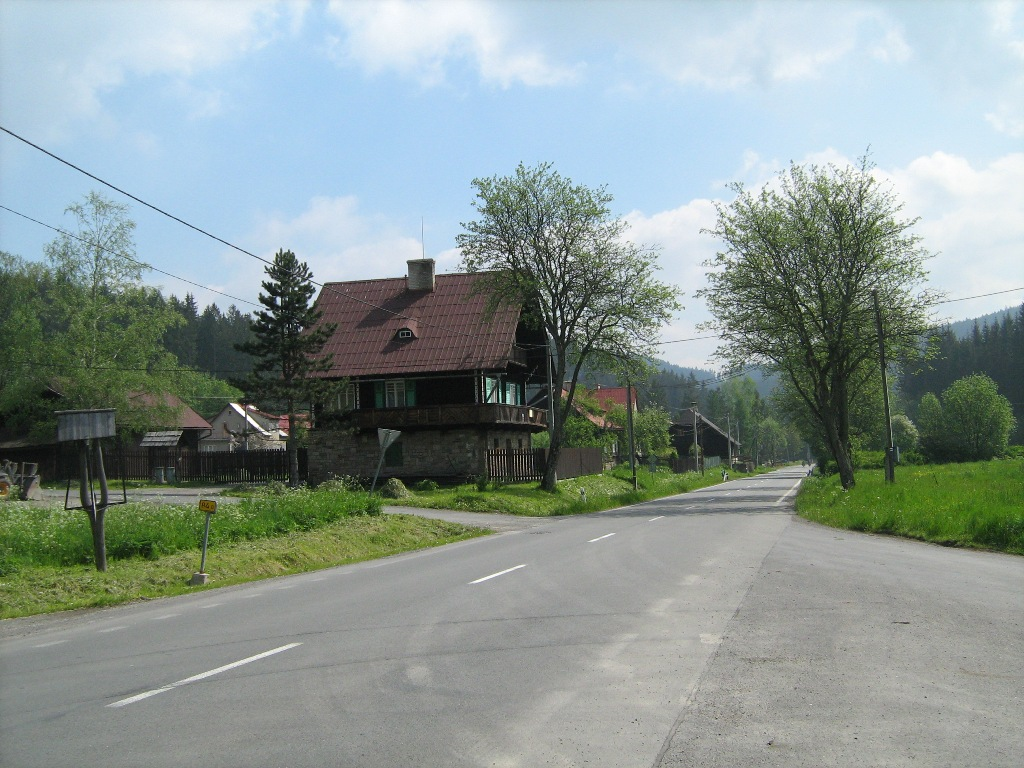
- Main road

- Flag Coat of arms

- Location in the Czech Republic
- Coordinates: 49°26′31″N 18°27′11″E
- Country: Czech Republic
- Region: Moravian-Silesian
- District: Frýdek-Místek
- Founded: 1817

Area
  - Total: 56.52 km^{2} (21.82 sq mi)
- Elevation: 546 m (1,791 ft)

Population (2026-01-01)
  - Total: 278
  - Density: 4.92/km^{2} (12.7/sq mi)
- Time zone: UTC+1 (CET)
  - Summer (DST): UTC+2 (CEST)
- Postal code: 739 15
- Website: www.obecbila.cz

Bílá is a municipality and village in Frýdek-Místek District in the Moravian-Silesian Region of the Czech Republic. It has about 300 inhabitants.

== Etymology ==
The name literally means 'white' in Czech.

== Geography ==
Bílá is located about 26 kilometres (16 mi) south of Frýdek-Místek and 40 km (25 mi) south of Ostrava, on the border with Slovakia. It lies in the Moravian-Silesian Beskids. The highest point is the Trojačka mountain at 987 m (3,238 ft) above sea level. The easternmost point of Moravia is located in the municipal territory.

The Bílá Ostravice River flows through the village and the Černá Ostravice River flows along the northern municipal border. They merge there and form the Ostravice River.

== History ==
Bílá was originally a small hamlet founded in 1817. In 1951, when the boundaries of the municipalities of Staré Hamry and Ostravice were redefined, Bílá was separated and became an independent municipality. Between 1974 and 1991, it was part of Staré Hamry. Since 1991, it has been independent again.

== Demographics ==
Historical population

| Year | Pop. | ±% |
|---|---|---|
| 1869 | 626 | — |
| 1880 | 713 | +13.9% |
| 1890 | 821 | +15.1% |
| 1900 | 822 | +0.1% |
| 1910 | 883 | +7.4% |

| Year | Pop. | ±% |
|---|---|---|
| 1921 | 855 | −3.2% |
| 1930 | 984 | +15.1% |
| 1950 | 729 | −25.9% |
| 1961 | 670 | −8.1% |
| 1970 | 559 | −16.6% |

| Year | Pop. | ±% |
|---|---|---|
| 1980 | 481 | −14.0% |
| 1991 | 371 | −22.9% |
| 2001 | 344 | −7.3% |
| 2011 | 290 | −15.7% |
| 2021 | 242 | −16.6% |

Source: Censuses

== Transport ==
In the southwestern part of the municipality is the road border crossing Bílá-Bumbálka / Makov to Slovakia. The border crossing is connected with Valašské Meziříčí and Olomouc by the I/35 road (part of the European route E442). The I/56 road connects the I/35 with the village of Bílá and continues to Frýdek-Místek.

== Sport ==
Bílá is known for its ski area suitable for both downhill skiing and cross-country skiing.

== Sights ==
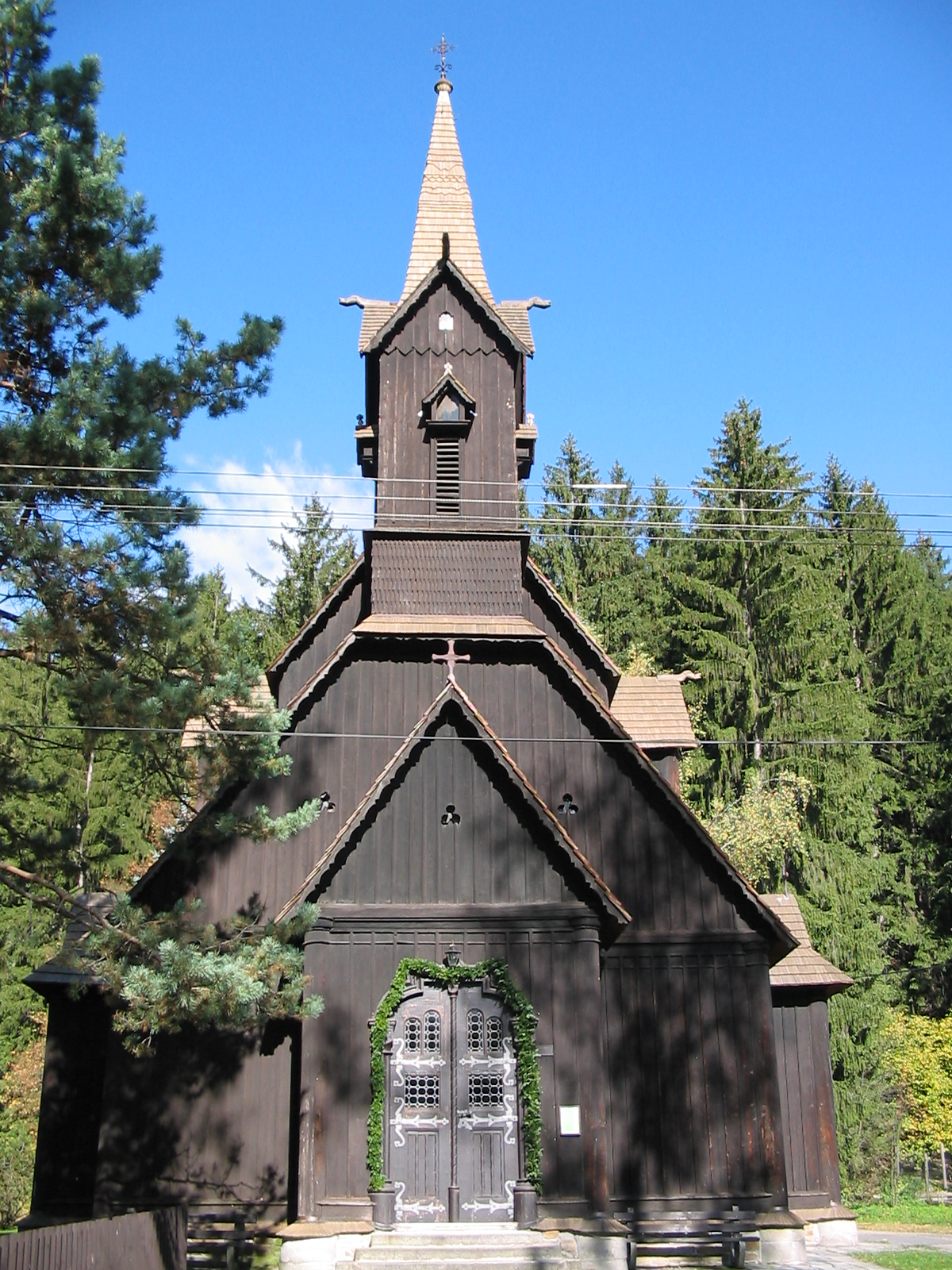
Church of Saint Frederick

The main landmark is the Church of Saint Frederick. This wooden Roman Catholic church was built at the expense of archbishop Friedrich Egon von Fürstenberg in 1873–1874.
