= Otakar Bystřina =

Czech writer (1861–1931)

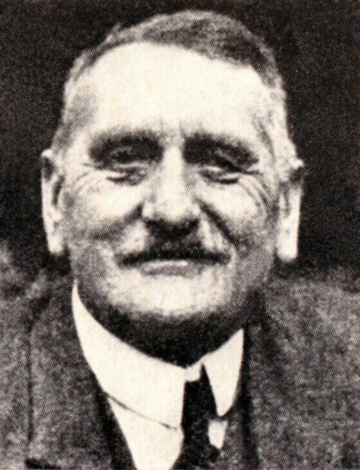
- Bystřina in 1929
- Born: Ferdinand Dostál; 23 May 1861; Věrovany, Moravia, Austrian Empire
- Died: 18 July 1931 (aged 70); Ostravice, Czechoslovakia
- Occupation: Writer

Otakar Bystřina (real name Ferdinand Dostál; 23 May 1861 – 18 July 1931) was a Czech writer and lawyer. He wrote humorous stories related to the Moravian ethnographic regions, especially to his native region of Haná.

== Biography ==
Otakar Bystřina was born Ferdinand Dostál on 23 May 1861 in Věrovany, Moravia, Austrian Empire, to the innkeeper's family. He studied at a gymnasium in Olomouc, but in 1878 he was expelled from school for disorderly conduct and completed his studies in Chrudim. His stepfather wanted him to study theology, but Bystřina preferred to break up with his family and entered the Faculty of Law of Charles University in Prague, from which he graduated in 1885. During his studies, he earned money in various ways, including as a typist and as a literary contributor to various magazines (e.g. Květy, Zlatá Praha and Švanda dudák).

After school, he was a trainee at the court and then worked as a legal assistant and attorney in various Moravian cities and towns. He is most closely associated with Nový Jičín, where he had a law office in 1893–1921 and in 1927–1931. In 1921, he and his family moved to Brno, but due to a lack of legal cases, he returned to Nový Jičín.

A close friend of Bystřina was the poet Petr Bezruč, other his friends included Joža Uprka and Josef Svatopluk Machar. Bystřina and Bezruč together bought a house in Staré Hamry in 1920, where they went for the summer months. Bystřina died on 18 July 1931 in Ostravice while on a hiking trip with Bezruč, at the age of 70.

== Work ==
Otakar Bystřina was primarily interested in writing humorous short stories. Most of his books are collections of these short stories. He drew inspiration mainly from his native ethnographic region of Haná, but also from other Moravian regions (Moravian Slovakia and Moravian Wallachia). The Haná dialect is often used in his works. The short story Hanácká legenda ('Hanakian Legend'; first published in 1904) is often considered the pinnacle of Bystřina's work.

His works include:

- Na vsi (1889) – collection of short stories
- Hanácké figurky (1890) – collection of short stories
- Hanačka v Praze (1896)
- Hanácká legenda (1904) – short story
- Pápení (1912) – collection of short stories; extended in 1926 and published as Přes tři řeky
- Bystřinův smích (first part 1917, second part 1926) – two collections of short stories
- Jak se naši škádlívají (1924) – collection of short stories
- Súchovská republika (1926) – collection of feuilletons inspired by the story of the painter Joža Uprka
- Humor Otakara Bystřiny z jeho spisů (1927)

== Honours ==
A street in Brno-Královo Pole is named Bystřinova after Otakar Bystřina.
