= Smrk =

Smrk may refer to:

- Smrk (Jizera Mountains), a mountain in the Jizera Mountains of Bohemia, Czech Republic
- Smrk (Moravian-Silesian Beskids), a mountain in the Moravian-Silesian Beskids range in the Czech Republic
- Smrk (Třebíč District), Vysočina, Czech Republic
