= Staré Hamry =

- Municipality
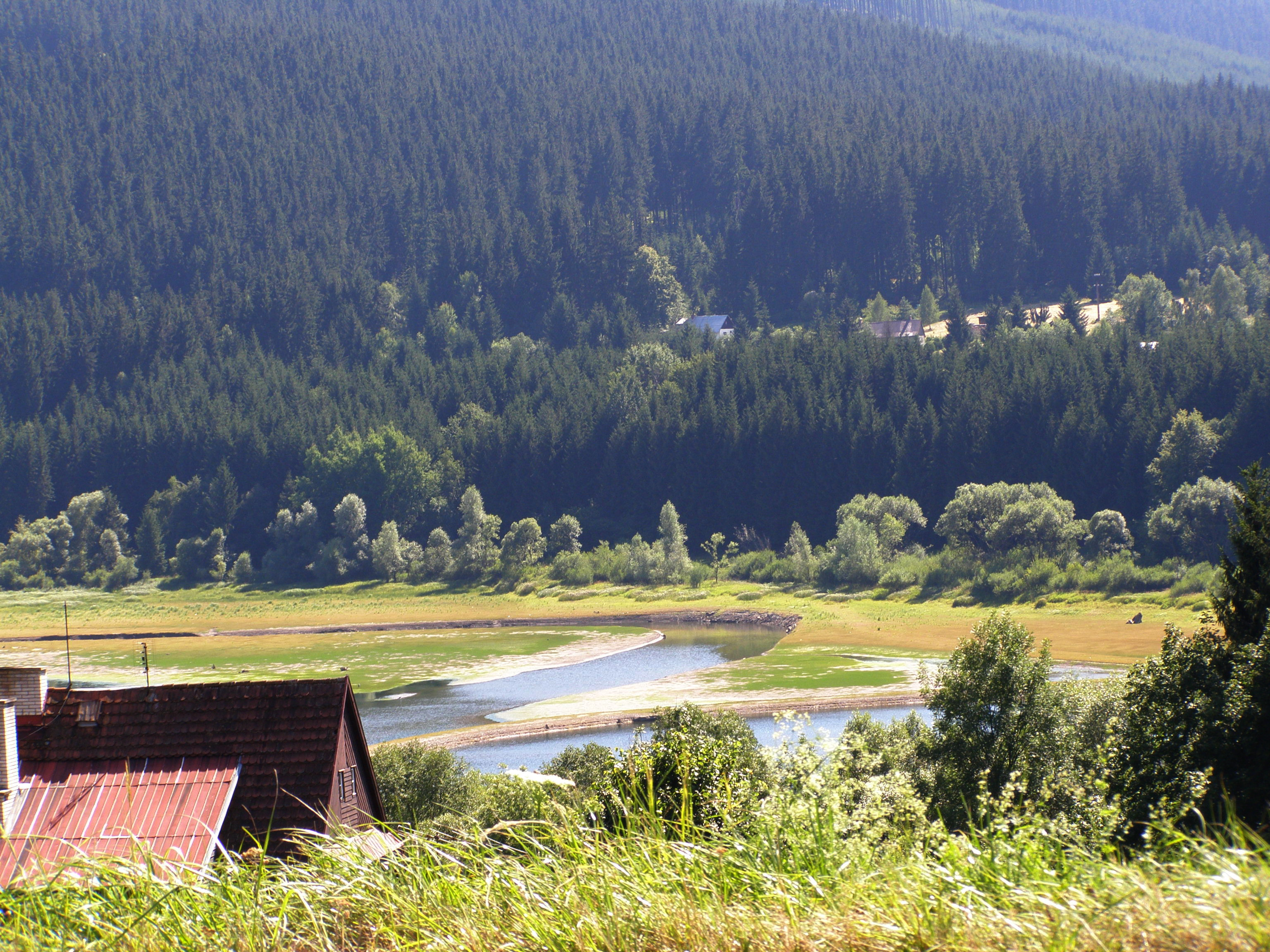
- Šance Reservoir

- Flag Coat of arms

- Location in the Czech Republic
- Coordinates: 49°28′21″N 18°26′45″E
- Country: Czech Republic
- Region: Moravian-Silesian
- District: Frýdek-Místek
- First mentioned: 1639

Area
  - Total: 84.64 km^{2} (32.68 sq mi)
- Elevation: 500 m (1,600 ft)

Population (2026-01-01)
  - Total: 541
  - Density: 6.39/km^{2} (16.6/sq mi)
- Time zone: UTC+1 (CET)
  - Summer (DST): UTC+2 (CEST)
- Postal code: 739 15
- Website: www.stare-hamry.cz

Staré Hamry (German: Althammer) is a municipality and village in the Frýdek-Místek District in the Moravian-Silesian Region of the Czech Republic. It has about 500 inhabitants.

== Etymology ==
The name Staré Hamry literally means 'old hammer mills' and refers to the hammer mills that were here in the 17th century. The settlement was initially called only Hamry; the prefix Staré was added later after hammer mills in Baška ("new hammer mills") were founded.

== Geography ==
Staré Hamry is located about 23 kilometres (14 mi) south of Frýdek-Místek and 38 km (24 mi) south of Ostrava. It lies in the Moravian-Silesian Beskids mountain range. The highest point is the Smrk mountain at 1,276 m (4,186 ft) above sea level, located on the northern municipal border. Most of the municipality is forested. The municipality is situated around the Šance Reservoir, which lies on the Ostravice River.

== History ==
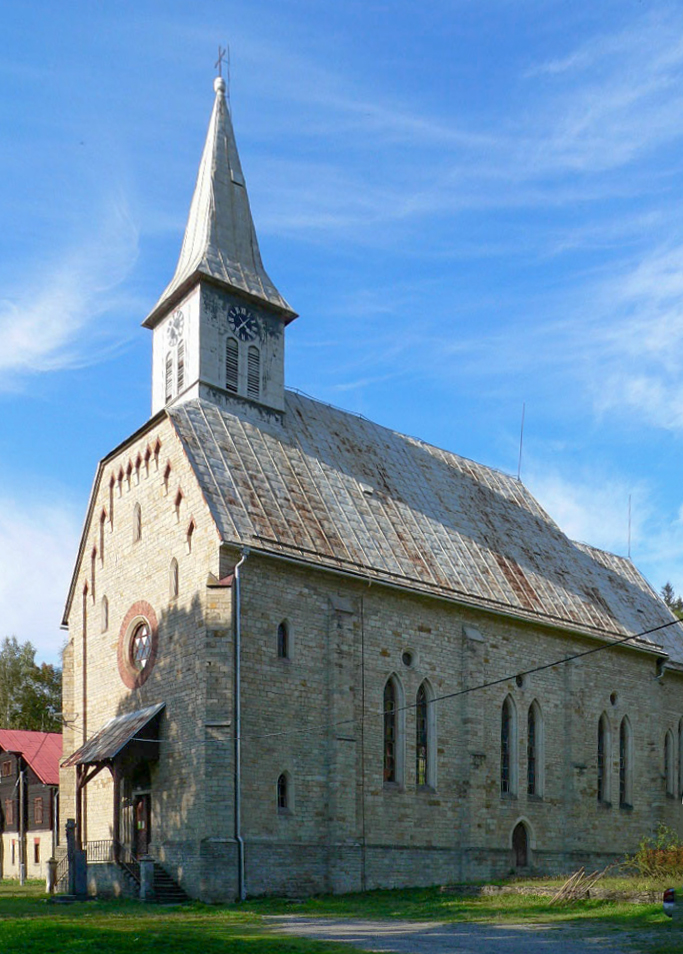
Church of Saint Henry

Staré Hamry was founded between 1636 and 1639, which is the period from which its first land book came. Politically, it was a part of the Friedek state country, which was a part of the Kingdom of Bohemia. The first hammer mill was built in 1638 and disappeared at the end of the 17th century.

The greatest development of the municipality was at the turn of the 19th and 20th centuries, when it became a recreation area.

After World War I, it became part of Czechoslovakia. In March 1939, it became part of Protectorate of Bohemia and Moravia. After World War II, it was restored to Czechoslovakia.

Initially, the village was located only on the right bank of the Ostravice, which formed the border between Czech Silesia and Moravia. In 1951, the northern part of the municipality was split from Staré Hamry and joined with Ostravice; whereas the southern part of Ostravice was split from it and joined with Staré Hamry. Both municipalities now lie on both banks of the Ostravice. In 1969, the Šance Reservoir was built.

== Demographics ==
Historical population

Year	Pop.	±%
1869	2,315	—
1880	2,509	+8.4%
1890	2,594	+3.4%
1900	2,369	−8.7%
1910	2,339	−1.3%

Year	Pop.	±%
1921	2,362	+1.0%
1930	2,528	+7.0%
1950	2,490	−1.5%
1961	2,023	−18.8%
1970	987	−51.2%

Year	Pop.	±%
1980	787	−20.3%
1991	698	−11.3%
2001	571	−18.2%
2011	539	−5.6%
2021	531	−1.5%

Source: Censuses

== Transport ==
The I/56 from Ostrava to Bílá runs through the municipality.

== Sights ==
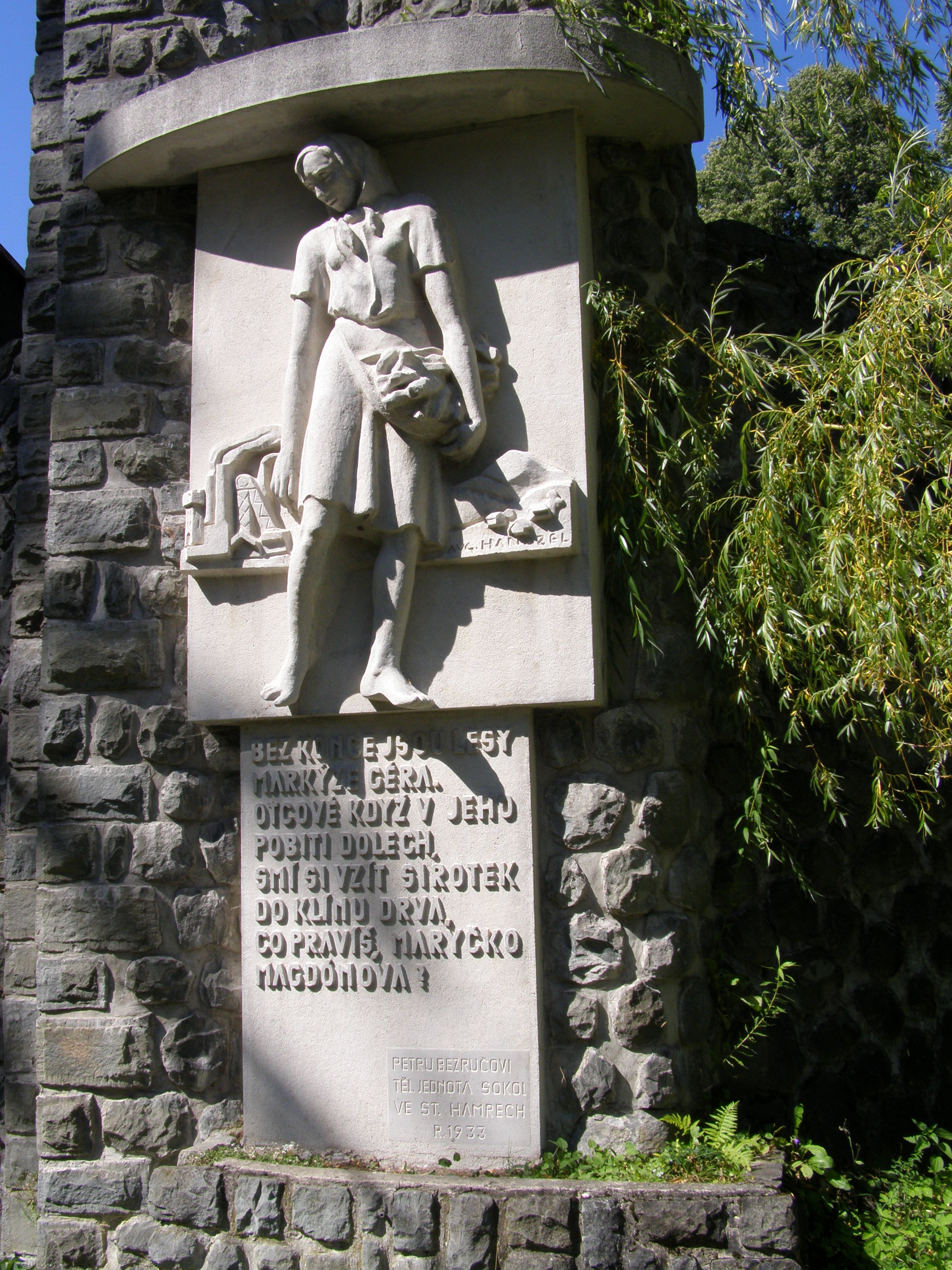
Monument to Maryčka Magdónova

The main landmark of the village is the Church of Saint Henry, built in 1863–1865. A monument on the outside of the cemetery wall from 1933 commemorates the social poem Maryčka Magdónova by Petr Bezruč.

In the hamlet of Gruň is the Church of the Virgin Mary. It is a wooden church, built in 1887–1890.

== Notable people ==
- Petr Bezruč (1867–1958), poet; often visited Staré Hamry and worked here
