= Šance Reservoir =

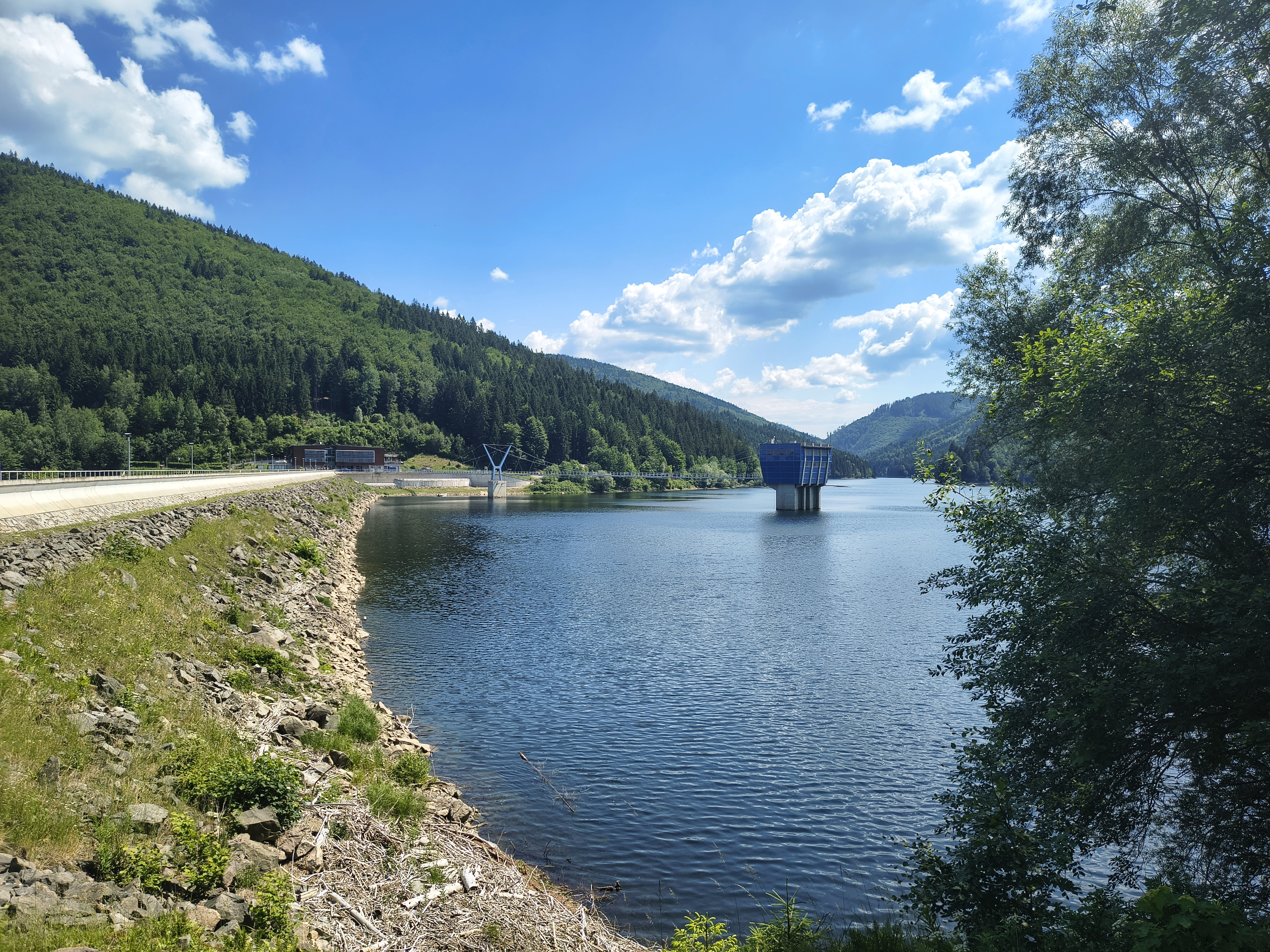
- View from the southeast

- Location within Czech Republic
- Coordinates: 49°30′37″N 18°24′57″E
- Type: reservoir
- Primary inflows: Ostravice
- Primary outflows: Ostravice
- Basin countries: Czech Republic
- Surface area: 3.37 km^{2} (1.30 sq mi)
- Surface elevation: 500 m (1,600 ft)

Šance Reservoir (Czech: vodní nádrž Šance) is a water reservoir and dam in Staré Hamry in the Moravian-Silesian Region of the Czech Republic. It is situated in the Moravian-Silesian Beskids mountain range. The reservoir is built on the upper course of the Ostravice River and has a surface area of 3.37 km^{2} (1.30 sq mi).

It was constructed in 1964–1969 and began operating in 1974. Part of the village of Staré Hamry was demolished and subsequently flooded during the construction. The name of the reservoir comes from the hill that overlooks the reservoir.

The reservoir is used mainly to supply drinking water to nearby towns and villages and to subdue floods on the Ostravice River.
