= Lubno (Frýdlant nad Ostravicí) =

Coordinates: 49°36′04″N 18°22′37″E

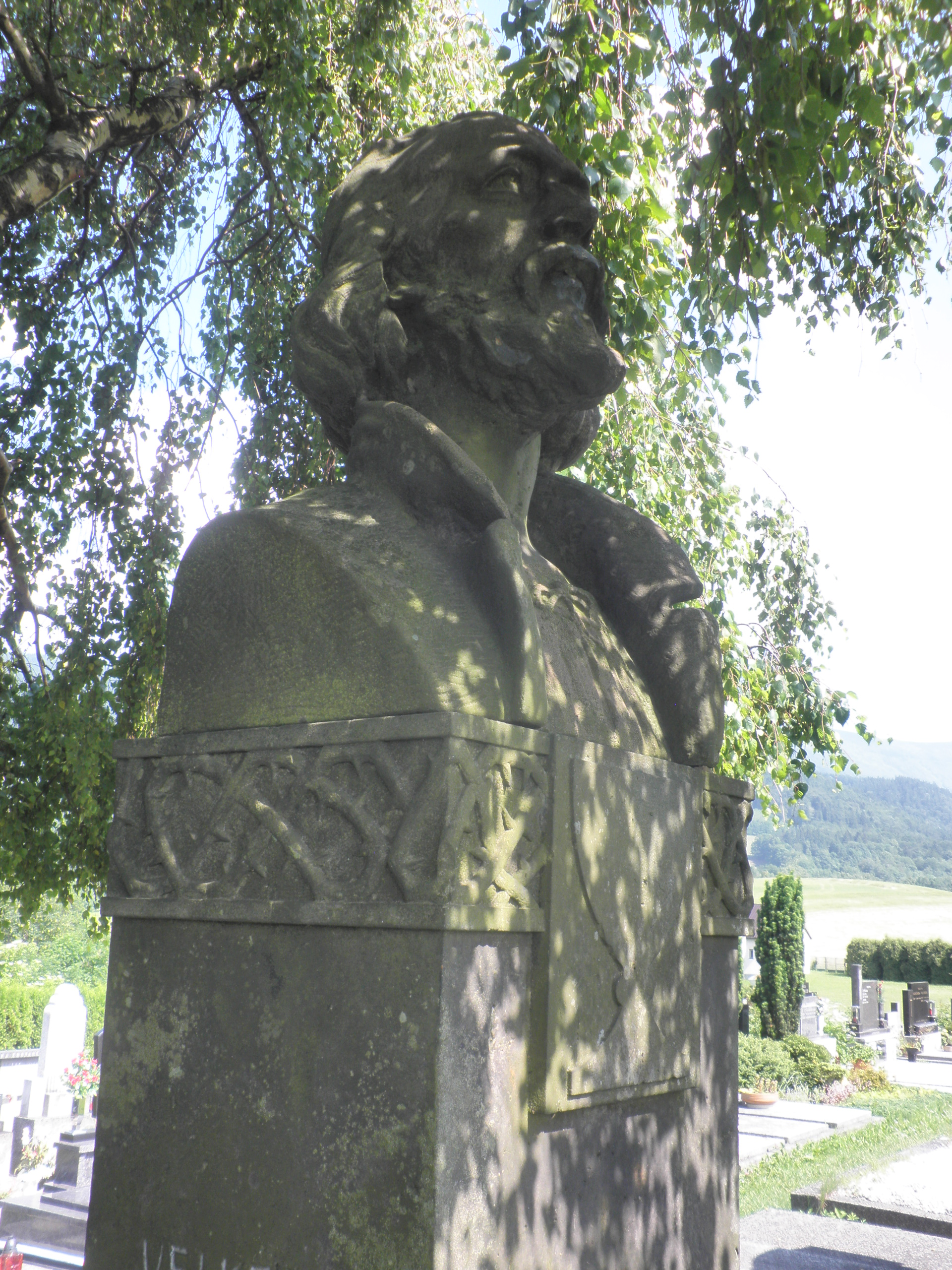
Jan Hus memorial in Lubno from 1921

Lubno (previously also Lubna) is a village within municipal borders of the town of Frýdlant nad Ostravicí in Frýdek-Místek District, Moravian-Silesian Region, Czech Republic. The village lies in the historical region of Těšín Silesia as opposed to Moravian Frýdlant. It has a population of around 520.

== History ==
The village was first mentioned in a written document in 1281 in the Latin sentence: magnos a terminis ville, que Lubna dicitur, circa terminos Moravie iusta fluvios Ostraviam. The village lay on the right bank of the Ostravice river (fluvios Ostraviam), which was in 1261 agreed by a special treaty to be a local border between Upper Silesia and Moravia. Since then area east of the river belonged politically to the Duchy of Opole and Racibórz and the Castellany of Cieszyn, which was in 1290 formed in the process of feudal fragmentation of Poland into the Duchy of Teschen, ruled by a local branch of Silesian Piast dynasty. In 1327 the duchy became a fee of the Kingdom of Bohemia, which after 1526 became a part of the Habsburg monarchy. In 1573 it was sold as one of 16 villages and the town of Friedeck and formed a state country split from the Duchy of Teschen.

It was inhabited by Lach-speaking Czech population. After World War I and fall of Austria-Hungary it became a part of Czechoslovakia. In March 1939 it became a part of Protectorate of Bohemia and Moravia. After World War II it was restored to Czechoslovakia.
