= Smrk (Moravian-Silesian Beskids) =

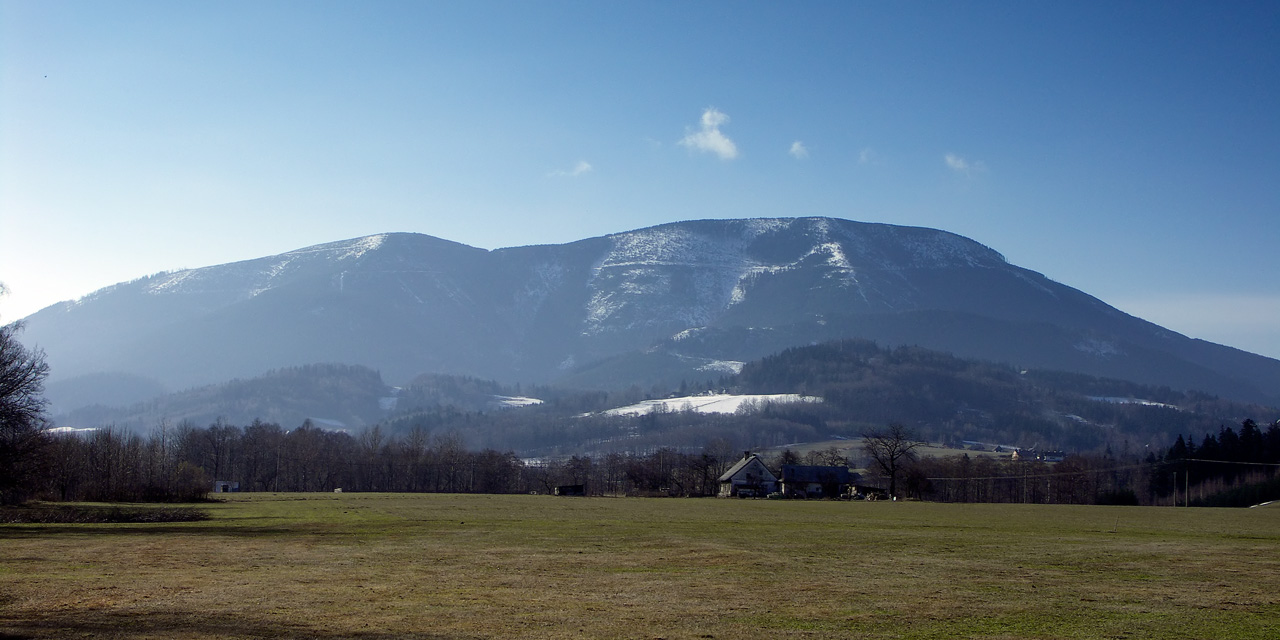

Highest point
- Elevation: 1,276.3 m (4,187 ft)
- Prominence: 591 m (1,939 ft)
- Isolation: 6.8 km (4.2 mi)
- Coordinates: 49°30′30″N 18°22′20″E

Geography
- Location within Czech Republic
- Location: Frýdlant nad Ostravicí, Moravian-Silesian Region, Czech Republic
- Parent range: Moravian-Silesian Beskids

Geology
- Mountain type: Godulian sandstone

Smrk is a massif and a mountain in the Moravian-Silesian Beskids range in the Czech Republic. With a height of 1,276 m (4,186 ft) it is the second highest summit of the range after Lysá hora. Its Northern slope steeply rises from the surrounding lowlands and is separated from the rest of the mountains by the deep Ostravice River (in the East) and Čeladenka (in the West) river valleys; in the South it merges in the lower Zadní hory (i.e. Rear mountains) area.

Although its name (which means spruce) suggests differently, it was originally covered mainly in beech and fir forests, with a higher share of spruce closer to the summit. During the industrial revolution in the region under the mountains in the 18th and 19th centuries when many ironworks were established, with a center in Frýdlant nad Ostravicí, there was a high demand for firewood and the original forests were felled out and replaced by secondary spruce plantations. These were heavily damaged by industrial fall-out from the Ostrava region also because non-natives spruce varieties, which were not well adapted to the local climate, were planted there. Thus everyone coming to Smrk from North will see a mountain stripped of trees in its upper parts. Other slopes were not so heavily damaged and are still forested in most places. Especially in the Čeladenka river valley there any many stretches of preserved or newly planted beech trees.

There are limited views from the summit which is covered in most places by also secondary (non-native to the Moravian-Silesian Beskids) mountain pines. Next to the secondary summit of Malý Smrk (i.e. Little Spruce) there are John Lennon and Jan Palach memorials.

Smrk is in the Beskydy Landscape Protected Area (Czech: Chráněná krajinná oblast Beskydy). Its summit lies partly in the first (most protected) zone. The Smrk and Malý Smrk Reserves (Czech: Přírodní rezervace Smrk and Czech: Přírodní rezervace Malý Smrk) are the best-preserved areas of both summits.
