= Skalice (Frýdek-Místek) =

Coordinates: 49°39′0″N 18°24′0″E

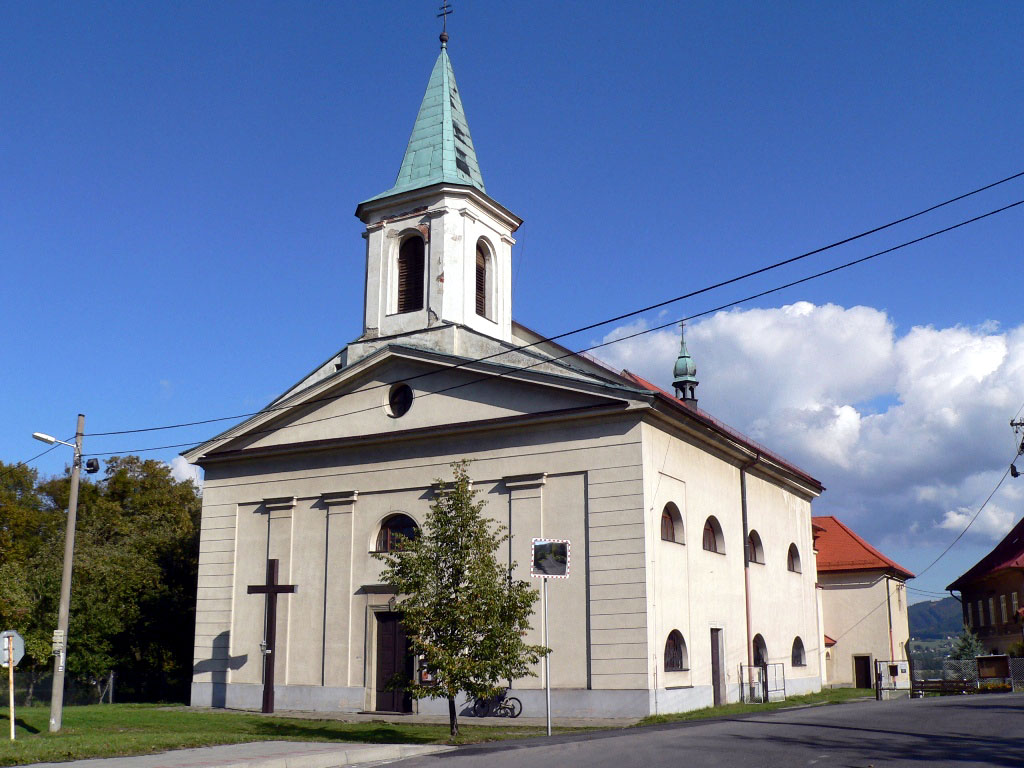
St. Martin Church

Skalice (Polish: Skalica, German: Skalitz) is a village and administrative part of Frýdek-Místek in the Moravian-Silesian Region of the Czech Republic. It was a separate municipality but became administratively a part of Frýdek-Místek in 1980. It has about 1,400 inhabitants. It lies in the historical region of Cieszyn Silesia.

== History ==
The village was first mentioned in a Latin document of Diocese of Wrocław called Liber fundationis episcopatus Vratislaviensis from around 1305 as item in Scali(c)za. It meant that the village was in the process of location (the size of land to pay a tithe from was not yet precised). The creation of the village was a part of a larger settlement campaign taking place in the late 13th century on the territory of what will be later known as Upper Silesia.

Politically the village belonged initially to the Duchy of Teschen, formed in 1290 in the process of feudal fragmentation of Poland and was ruled by a local branch of Piast dynasty. In 1327 the duchy became a fee of Kingdom of Bohemia, which after 1526 became part of the Habsburg monarchy.

In 1573, it was sold as one of 16 villages and the town of Friedeck and formed a state country split from the Duchy of Teschen.

After World War I and fall of Austria-Hungary it became a part of Czechoslovakia. In March 1939 it became a part of Protectorate of Bohemia and Moravia. After World War II it was restored to Czechoslovakia.
