= Staré Město (Frýdek-Místek District) =

- Municipality
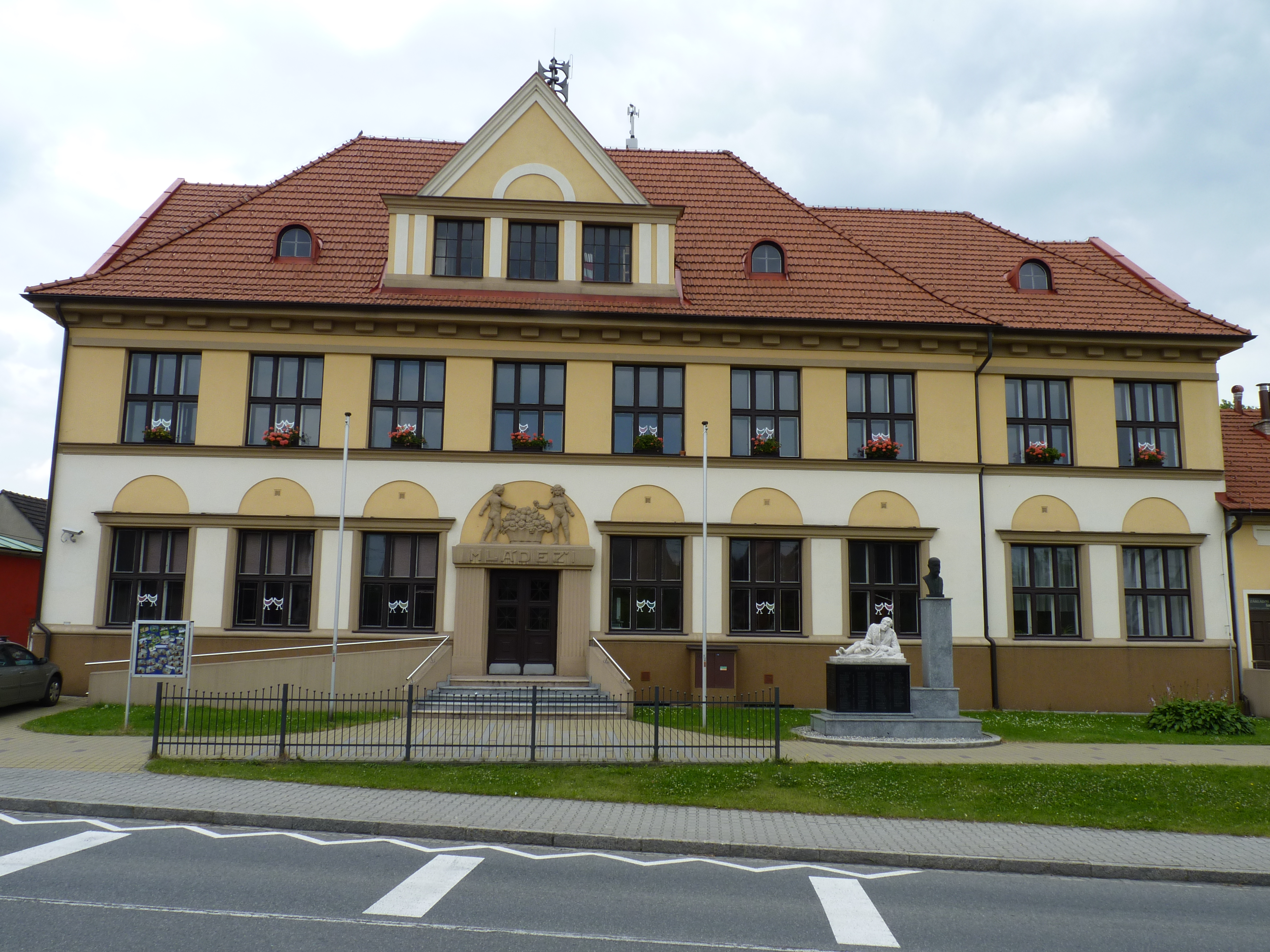
- Primary school

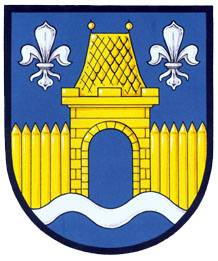
- Flag Coat of arms

- Location in the Czech Republic
- Coordinates: 49°40′12″N 18°21′49″E
- Country: Czech Republic
- Region: Moravian-Silesian
- District: Frýdek-Místek
- First mentioned: 1434

Area
  - Total: 4.68 km^{2} (1.81 sq mi)
- Elevation: 301 m (988 ft)

Population (2026-01-01)
  - Total: 1,494
  - Density: 319/km^{2} (827/sq mi)
- Time zone: UTC+1 (CET)
  - Summer (DST): UTC+2 (CEST)
- Postal code: 738 01
- Website: www.stare-mesto.cz

Staré Město (German: Altstadt, Polish: Stare Miasto) is a municipality and village in Frýdek-Místek District in the Moravian-Silesian Region of the Czech Republic. It has about 1,500 inhabitants.

== Etymology ==
In Czech, the name literally means 'old town'. It was used to distinguish from the newly established town of Frýdek.

== Geography ==
Staré Město is located south of Frýdek-Místek and is urbanistically fused with this city. It is located about 16 kilometres (10 mi) south of Ostrava, in the historical region of Cieszyn Silesia. It lies in the Moravian-Silesian Foothills. The municipality is situated at the confluence of the Ostravice and Morávka rivers.

== History ==
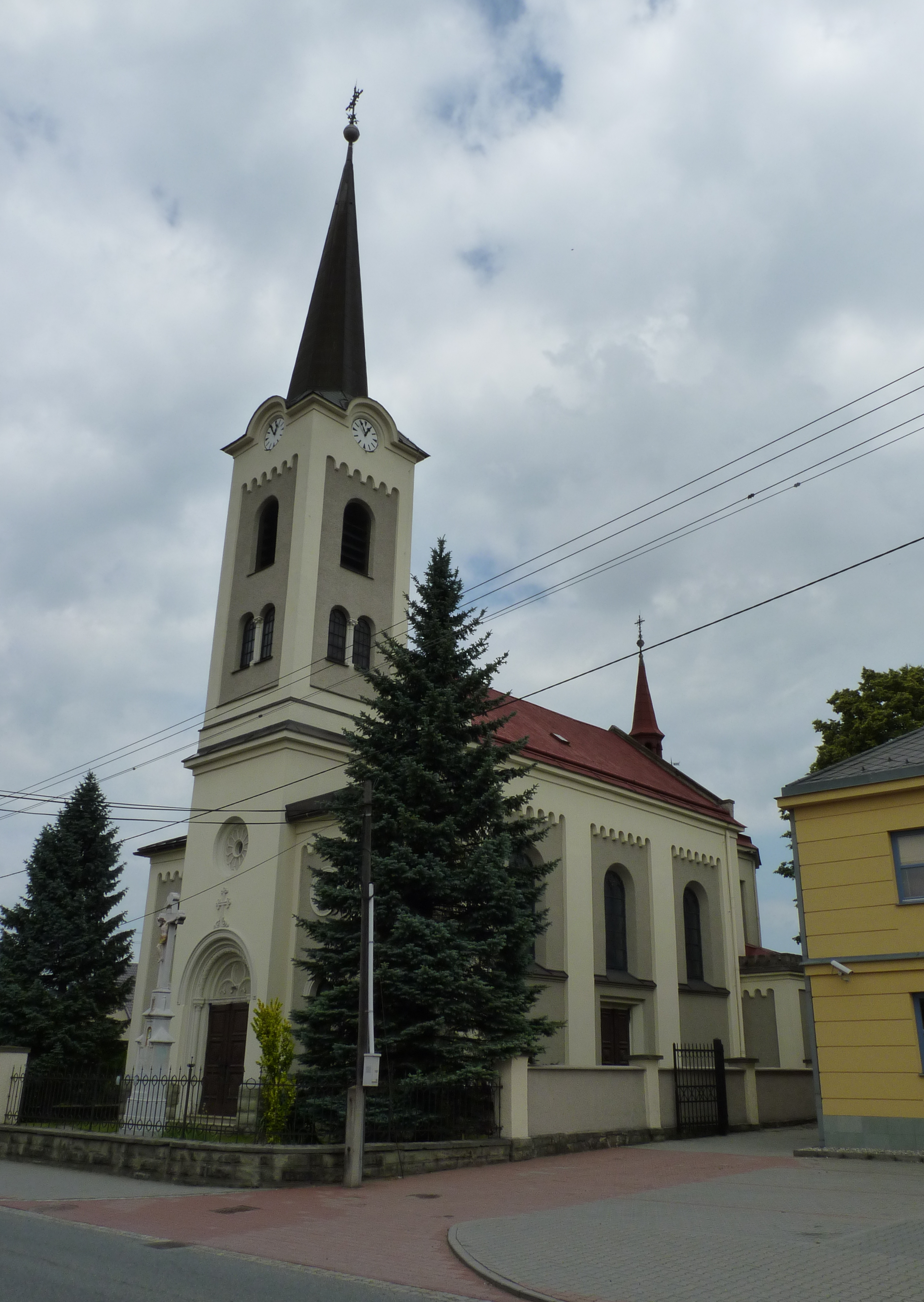
Church of Saint Joseph

The predecessor of Staré Město was a village called Jemnice, which was first mentioned in a deed of bishop Wawrzyniec from 1223. Later, the town of Frýdek was founded in the vicinity, first mentioned in 1386, and absorbed Jemnice. The village in the area of Jemnice was first mentioned as Staremiesto in 1434.

Politically the village belonged initially to the Duchy of Teschen. In 1327 the duchy became a fee of Kingdom of Bohemia. In 1573 it was sold as one of 16 villages and the town of Frýdek and formed a state country split from the Duchy of Teschen.

After World War I and fall of Austria-Hungary, it became a part of Czechoslovakia. In March 1939 it became a part of Protectorate of Bohemia and Moravia. After World War II it was restored to Czechoslovakia. Staré Město was later merged into the town of Frýdek-Místek, but after a petition it separated as an independent municipality on 24 November 1990.

== Demographics ==
Historical population

Year	Pop.	±%
1869	790	—
1880	1,033	+30.8%
1890	1,329	+28.7%
1900	1,726	+29.9%
1910	1,940	+12.4%

Year	Pop.	±%
1921	2,088	+7.6%
1930	2,373	+13.6%
1950	2,062	−13.1%
1961	1,912	−7.3%
1970	1,509	−21.1%

Year	Pop.	±%
1980	1,472	−2.5%
1991	1,162	−21.1%
2001	1,175	+1.1%
2011	1,429	+21.6%
2021	1,440	+0.8%

Source: Censuses

== Transport ==
The D48 motorway (part of the European route E462) from Nový Jičín to the Czech–Polish border in Chotěbuz runs through the municipality.

== Sights ==
The main landmark of Staré Město is the Church of Saint Joseph. It was built in the neo-Romanesque style in 1902–1904.
