= Věrovany =

- Municipality
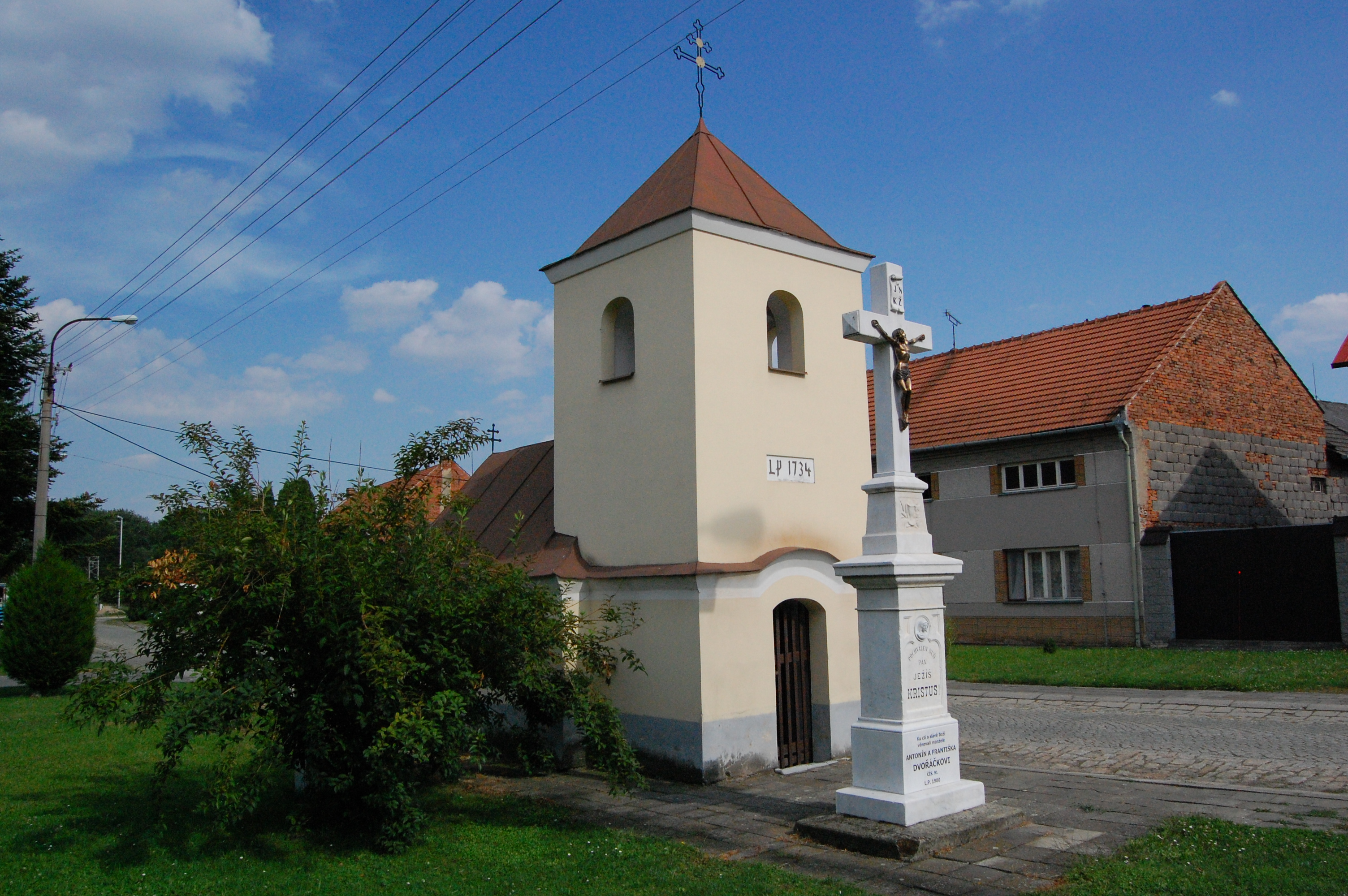
- Chapel of Saint John of Nepomuk

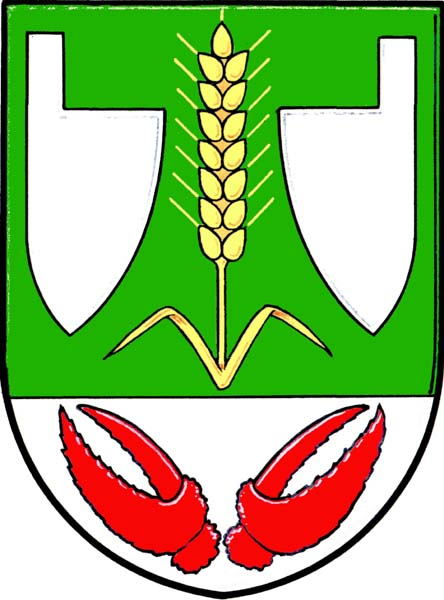
- Flag Coat of arms

- Location in the Czech Republic
- Coordinates: 49°27′40″N 17°17′17″E
- Country: Czech Republic
- Region: Olomouc
- District: Olomouc
- First mentioned: 1131

Area
  - Total: 17.81 km^{2} (6.88 sq mi)
- Elevation: 206 m (676 ft)

Population (2026-01-01)
  - Total: 1,405
  - Density: 78.89/km^{2} (204.3/sq mi)
- Time zone: UTC+1 (CET)
  - Summer (DST): UTC+2 (CEST)
- Postal code: 783 76
- Website: www.verovany.cz

Věrovany (German: Wierowan, Werowan) is a municipality and village in Olomouc District in the Olomouc Region of the Czech Republic. It has about 1,400 inhabitants.

Věrovany lies approximately 16 kilometres (10 mi) south of Olomouc and 218 km (135 mi) east of Prague.

== Administrative division ==
Věrovany consists of three municipal parts (in brackets population according to the 2021 census):

- Věrovany (570)
- Nenakonice (375)
- Rakodavy (415)

== Demographics ==
Historical population
Year	Pop.	±%
1869	1,396	—
1880	1,567	+12.2%
1890	1,617	+3.2%
1900	1,582	−2.2%
1910	1,671	+5.6%
1921	1,696	+1.5%
1930	1,623	−4.3%
1950	1,368	−15.7%
1961	1,431	+4.6%
1970	1,297	−9.4%
1980	1,329	+2.5%
1991	1,303	−2.0%
2001	1,300	−0.2%
2011	1,346	+3.5%
2021	1,360	+1.0%
Source: Censuses

== Notable people ==
- Otakar Bystřina (1861–1931), writer
