= Frýdek, Frýdek-Místek =

Former town, now neighborhood of Frýdek-Místek

Coordinates: 49°41′8″N 18°21′2″E

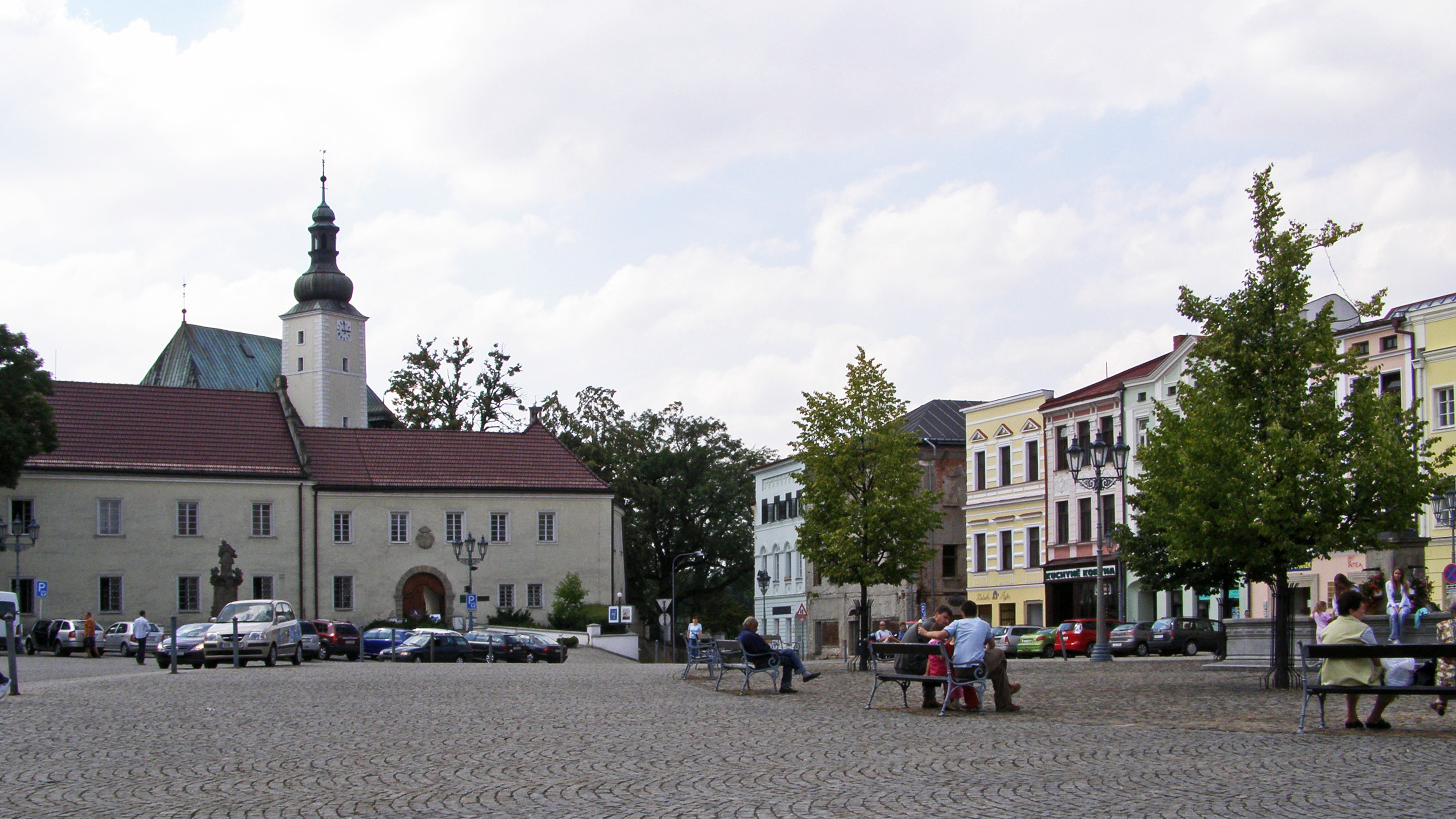
A Market Square and a castle in Frýdek

Frýdek (Latin: Fridecca, German: Friedek, Friedeck, Polish: Frydek) was an independent town in Silesia that was joined with the Moravian town of Místek on 1 January 1943 to form the town of Frýdek-Místek. It lies on the western border of the Cieszyn Silesia region.

== History ==
Frýdek lies on the right bank of the Ostravice River, that was agreed in 1261 by a special treaty between Władysław Opolski, Duke of Opole and Racibórz and Ottokar II of Bohemia to be a local border between their states. In 1290 in the process of feudal fragmentation of Poland the Duchy of Teschen was formed, and the border on the Ostravice was then confirmed in 1297.

The border from the Silesian side was protected by a small gord around which a small town emerged called Jamnice/Jamnica. It could have been first mentioned in a Latin document of Diocese of Wrocław called Liber fundationis episcopatus Vratislaviensis from around 1305 as item in Jannutha. Surely both the town and a gord were later mentioned in 1327 as Jemnicz when Casimir I, Duke of Cieszyn became a vassal of the King of Bohemia. The term oppidum used to describe it in the accompanying document was used in contrary to civitates ruling themselves under German rights of Cieszyn, Bielsko and Fryštát. It probably meant that Jemnicz was ruled under Polish (ducal) traditional rights.

The town Frýdek was first mentioned in 1386 as Fridek and later in 1416 as Fredeck. The town had to be established under German rights between 1327 and 1386 on the grounds of Jemnicz, which was later absorbed by Frýdek. (Note: The village Staré Město is a remnant of it.) The church in Jemnicz stayed a parish church for Frýdek for some time in the 14th century, but the parish was then moved to a newly built church in Frýdek, that was then mentioned in the register of Peter's Pence payment from 1447 among 50 parishes of Teschen deaconry as Fredek. During the location of Frýdek the castle was also built, as part of the new town's defensive walls, where afterwards resided a ducal clerk, responsible for collecting taxes. The castle was expanded in the 15th century by Casimir II, Duke of Cieszyn. In that century the town together with the surrounding villages was a few times pawned. In 1526 the Kingdom of Bohemia became part of the Habsburg monarchy. In 1573 Frýdek together with 16 nearby villages (Note: As they are retrospectively listed in the document from 1584: Baška, Bruzovice, Dobrá, Janovice, Lískovec, Lubno, Nižní Lhoty, Nošovice, Pazderna, Pržno, Raškovice, Sedliště, Skalice, Staré Město, Vojkovice, Vyšní Lhoty. Later also another villages were established within its territory, like: Kaňovice, Malenovice, Morávka, Nová Ves or Krásná.) were sold and split from the Duchy of Teschen and formed a separate state country. The state country, with the Frýdek castle as its administrative centre, was then owned by several noble families. In the 18th century first Jews settled in the town. In the late 18th century textile industry developed in Frýdek. In 1848 the town became a seat of a political county, one of seven in the Austrian Silesia (later abolished, and reestablished in 1901). In 1871 the railway reached the town.

In 1864–1865 a Jewish synagogue was built here, and in 1911 a Lutheran church was also built. According to the Austrian census of 1910 the town had 9879 inhabitants living in 734 buildings. The census asked people their native language, and results show that 5,123 (51.9%) were German-speaking, 4,033 (40.8%) were Czech-speaking and 574 (5.8%) was Polish-speaking. The dominant religious groups were Roman Catholics with 9,199 (93.1%), followed by Protestants with 353 (3.6%) and the Jews with 353 (3.6%).

After World War I, fall of Austria-Hungary it became a part of Czechoslovakia. In March 1939 it became a part of Protectorate of Bohemia and Moravia. On 1 January 1943 the towns of Frýdek and Místek and several other villages were joined to form a single town. After the war it was restored to Czechoslovakia.

== Gallery ==
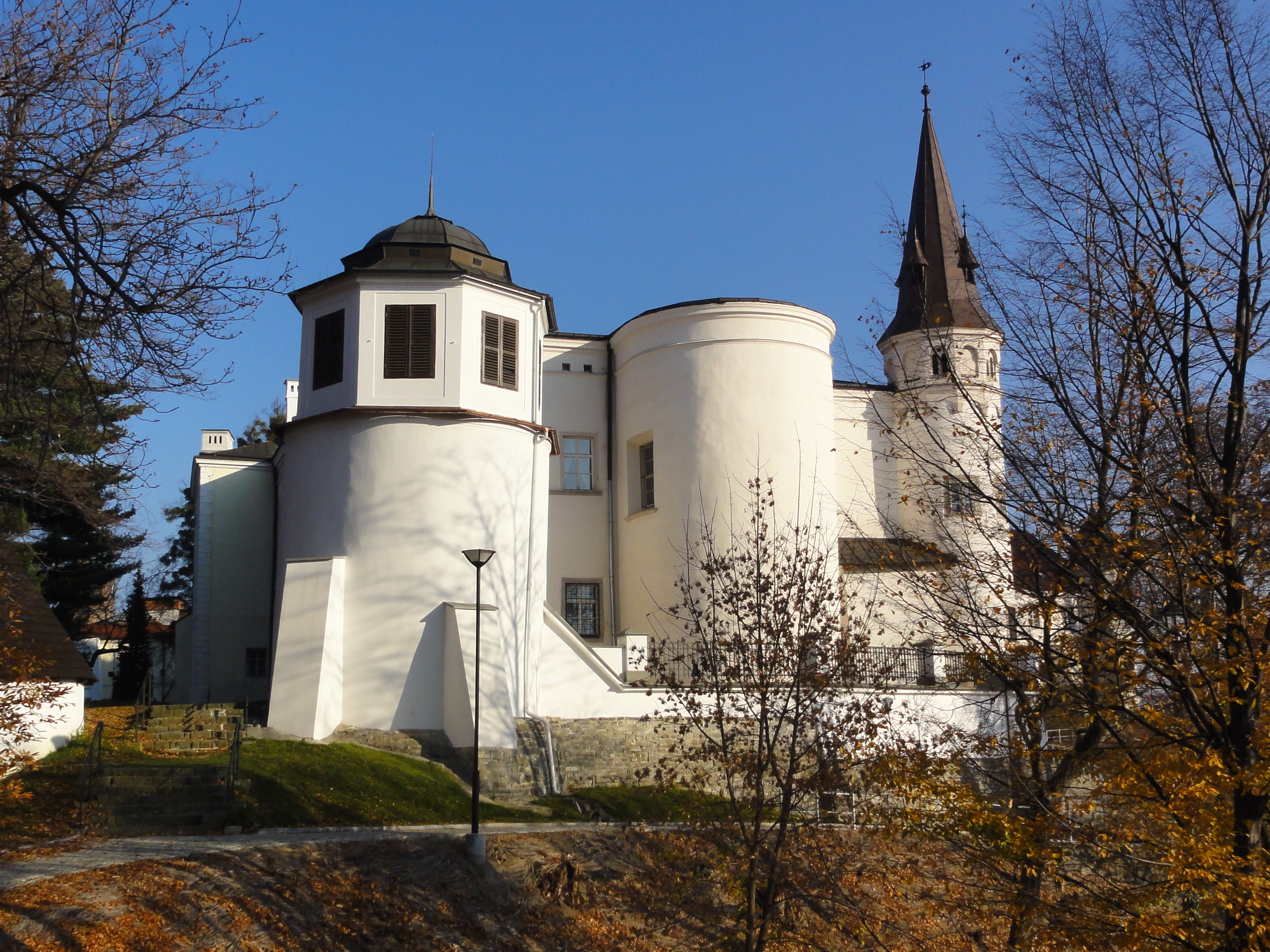
Frýdek castle

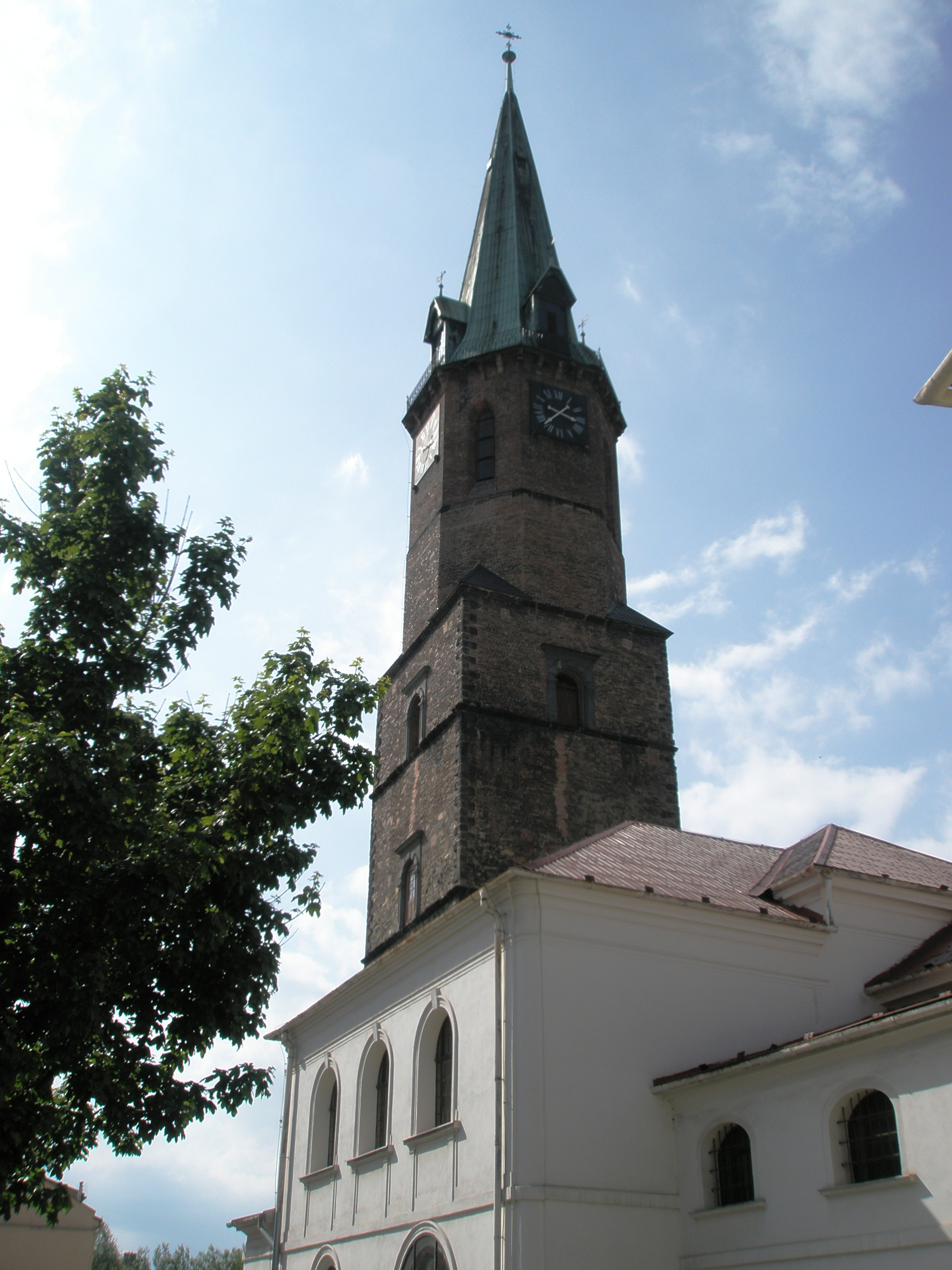
Catholic parish church

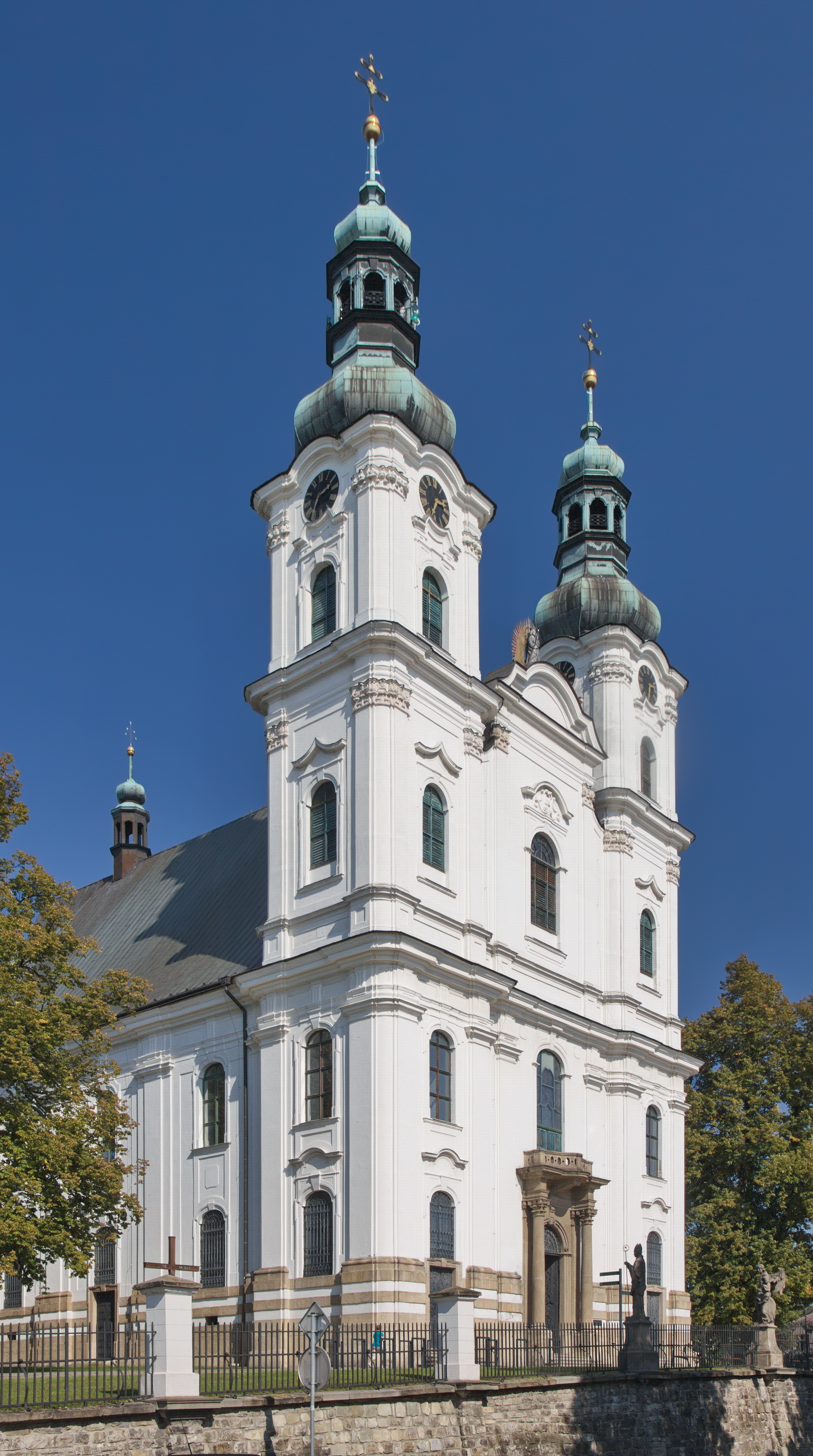
Basilica of the Visitation of Our Lady

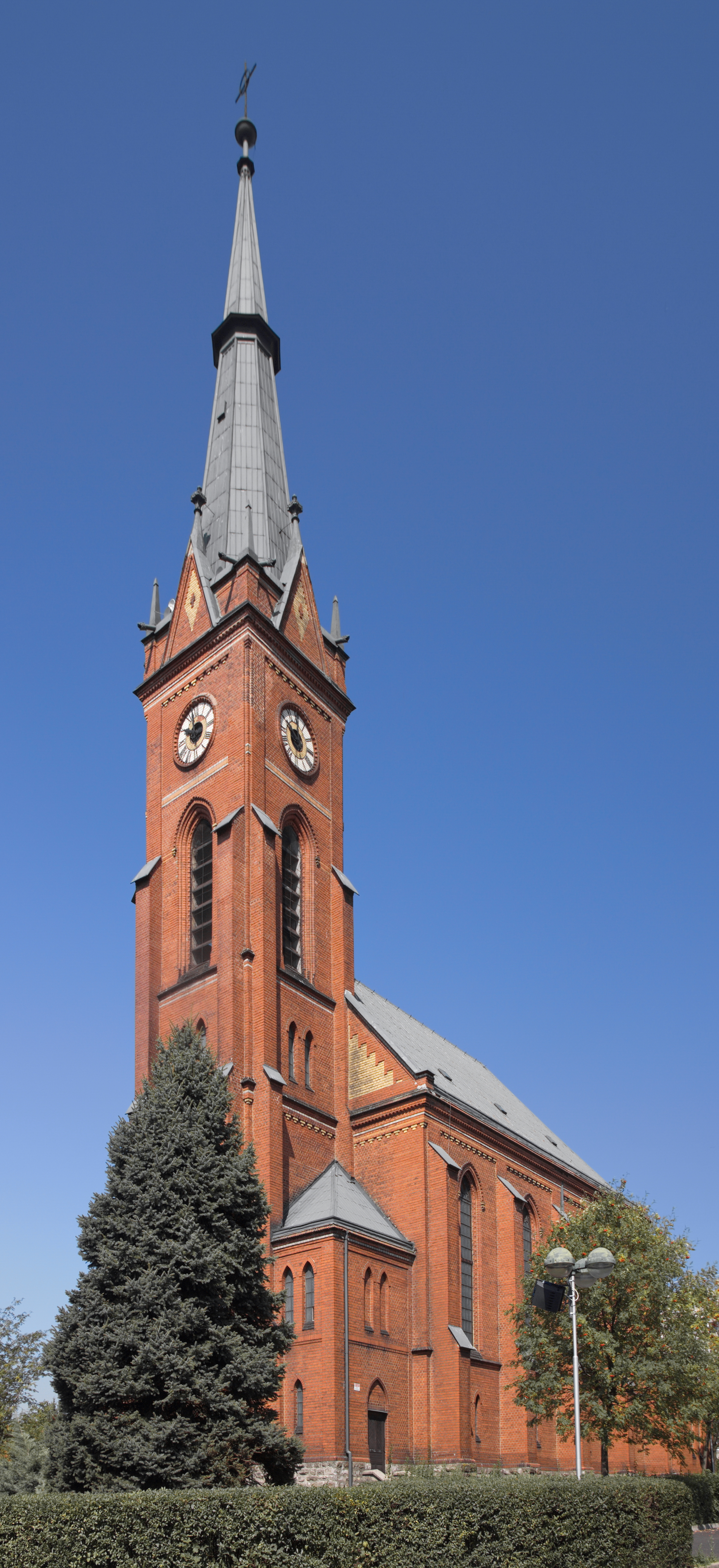
Lutheran church

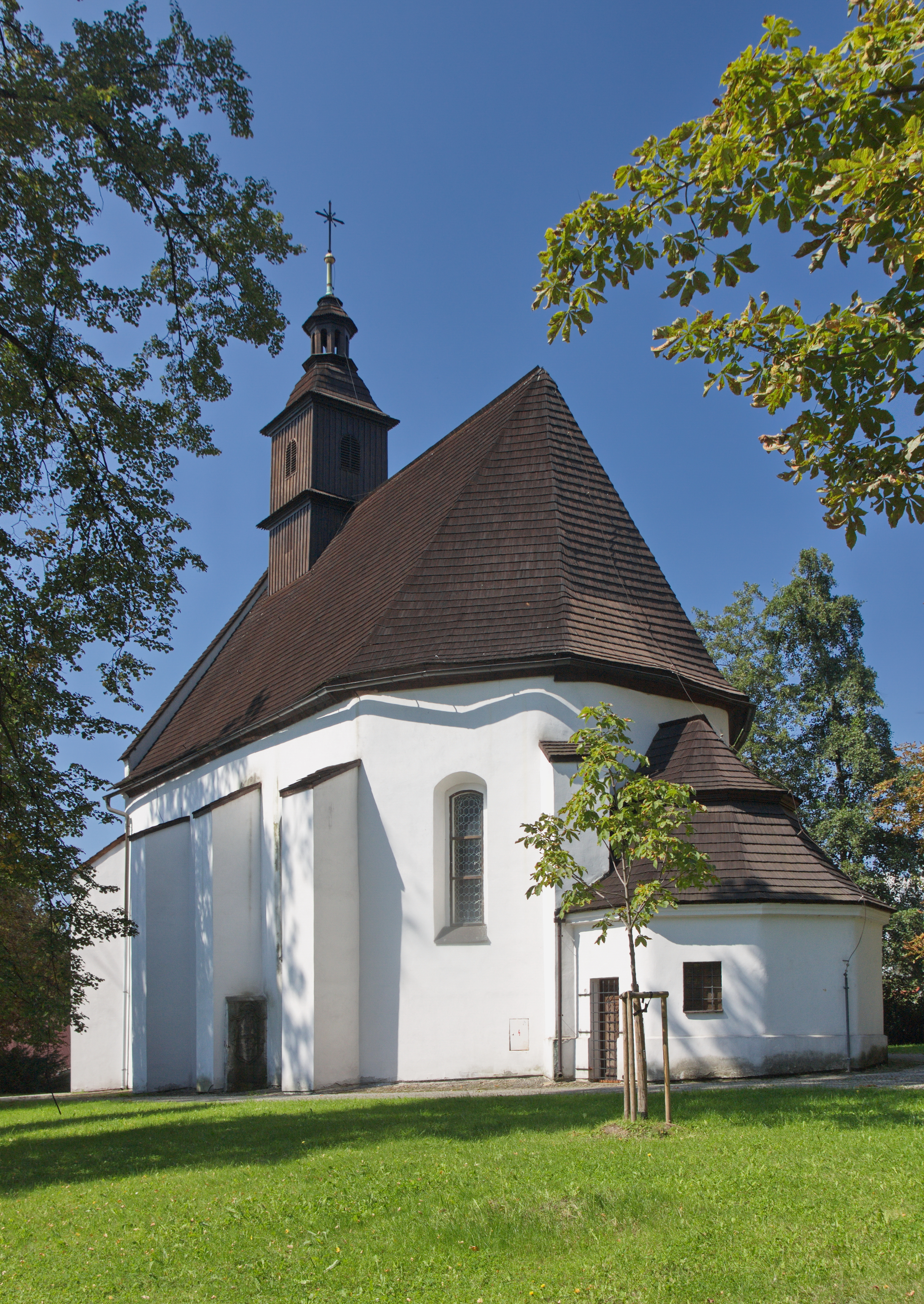
Church of Saint Judoc

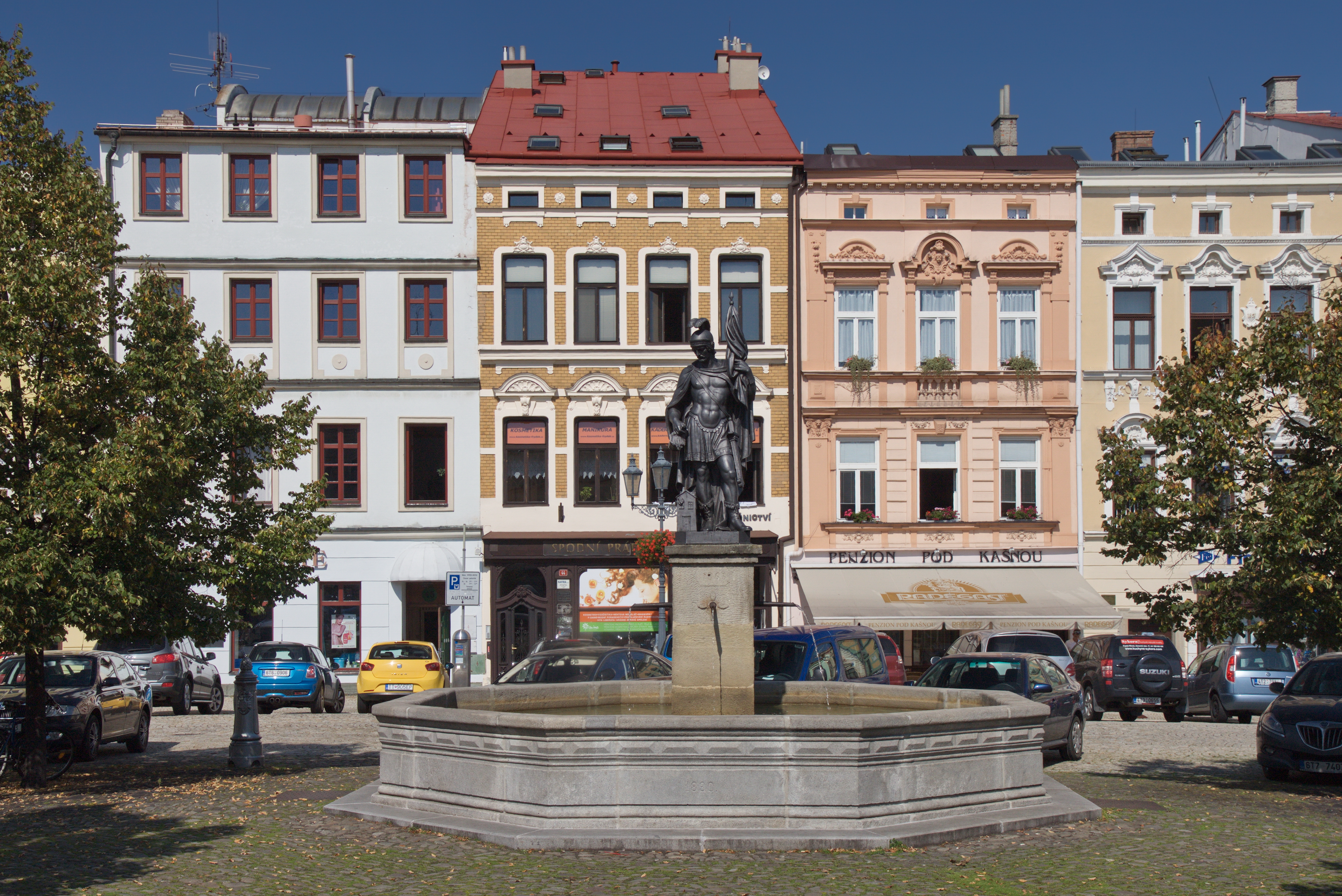
Fountain of St. Florian on Zámecké Square

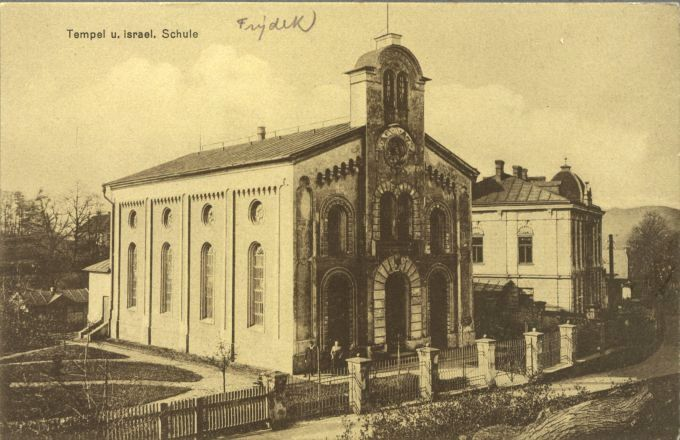
Synagogue
