= Ostravice =

- Municipality
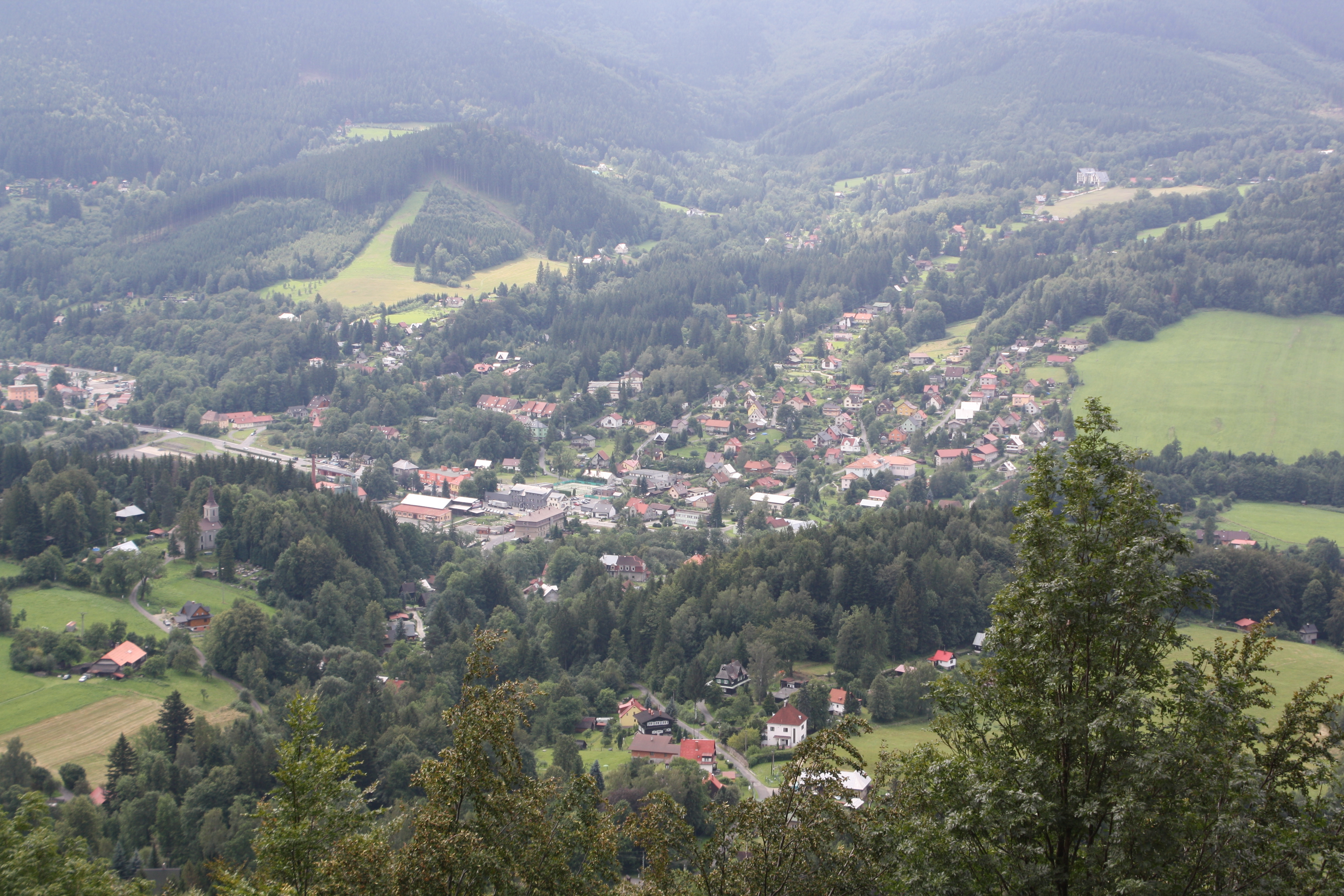
- General view

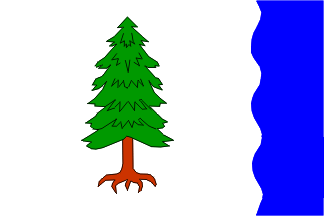
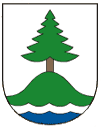
- Flag Coat of arms

- Location in the Czech Republic
- Coordinates: 49°32′23″N 18°23′29″E
- Country: Czech Republic
- Region: Moravian-Silesian
- District: Frýdek-Místek
- First mentioned: 1581

Area
  - Total: 27.71 km^{2} (10.70 sq mi)
- Elevation: 415 m (1,362 ft)

Population (2026-01-01)
  - Total: 2,558
  - Density: 92.31/km^{2} (239.1/sq mi)
- Time zone: UTC+1 (CET)
  - Summer (DST): UTC+2 (CEST)
- Postal code: 739 14
- Website: www.obec-ostravice.cz

Ostravice (German: Ostrawitz, Polish: Ostrawica) is a municipality and village in Frýdek-Místek District in the Moravian-Silesian Region of the Czech Republic. It has about 2,600 inhabitants.

== Geography ==
Ostravice is located about 15 kilometres (9 mi) south of Frýdek-Místek and 30 km (19 mi) south of Ostrava. It lies in the Moravian-Silesian Beskids. The highest point is next to the top of Lysá hora at 1,322 m (4,337 ft) above sea level. The municipality is situated in the valley of the Ostravice River.

== History ==
The first written mention of Ostravice is from 1581, when it was part of the Hukvaldy estate.

In 1951, the territory of Ostravice and neighbouring Staré Hamry was newly divided.

== Demographics ==
Historical population

Year	Pop.	±%
1869	1,805	—
1880	2,050	+13.6%
1890	2,077	+1.3%
1900	1,974	−5.0%
1910	2,250	+14.0%

Year	Pop.	±%
1921	2,145	−4.7%
1930	2,154	+0.4%
1950	2,236	+3.8%
1961	2,359	+5.5%
1970	2,438	+3.3%

Year	Pop.	±%
1980	2,508	+2.9%
1991	2,413	−3.8%
2001	2,308	−4.4%
2011	2,307	−0.0%
2021	2,488	+7.8%

Source: Censuses

== Economy ==
Ostravice serves year-round as a tourist resort.

== Transport ==
The I/56 road (which connects Frýdek-Místek with the I/35 road near the Czech–Slovak border) runs through the municipality.

Ostravice is the terminus and starting point of a short local railway line to Frýdlant nad Ostravicí. The municipality is served by two train stations.

== Sights ==
The main landmark of Ostravice is the Church of the Holy Trinity. It is a simple rural church, built in the Neoclassical style in 1788–1789.
