= Baška (Frýdek-Místek District) =

- Municipality
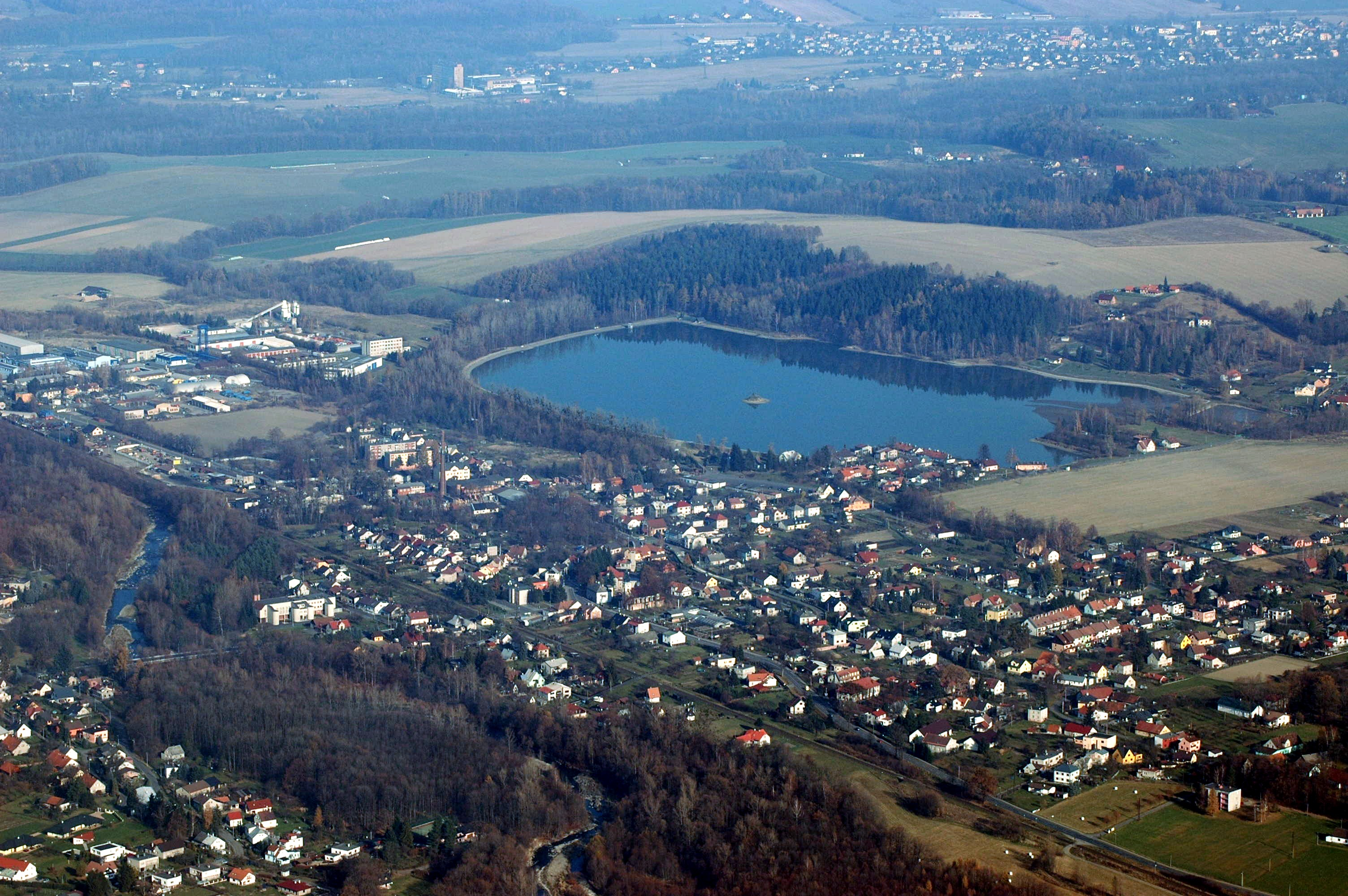
- Aerial view

- Flag Coat of arms

- Location in the Czech Republic
- Coordinates: 49°38′45″N 18°22′21″E
- Country: Czech Republic
- Region: Moravian-Silesian
- District: Frýdek-Místek
- First mentioned: 1434

Area
  - Total: 12.83 km^{2} (4.95 sq mi)
- Elevation: 313 m (1,027 ft)

Population (2026-01-01)
  - Total: 4,056
  - Density: 316.1/km^{2} (818.8/sq mi)
- Time zone: UTC+1 (CET)
  - Summer (DST): UTC+2 (CEST)
- Postal code: 739 01
- Website: www.baska.cz

Baška (Czech pronunciation: [ˈbaʃka]; Polish: Baszka) is a municipality and village in Frýdek-Místek District in the Moravian-Silesian Region of the Czech Republic. It has about 4,100 inhabitants.

== Administrative division ==
Baška consists of three municipal parts (in brackets population according to the 2021 census):

- Baška (1,850)
- Hodoňovice (728)
- Kunčičky u Bašky (1,304)

== Etymology ==
The name is probably derived from personal name Baška. According to less probable theories, the name is derived from the folk name for the sheep that were bred here.

== Geography ==
Baška Reservoir, drained during its reconstruction

Baška is located about 3 kilometres (2 mi) south of Frýdek-Místek and 17 km (11 mi) south of Ostrava. It is situated on both sides of the historical border between Moravia and Silesia; Hodoňovice and Kunčičky u Bašky lies in Moravia and the village of Baška in Silesia. It lies in the Moravian-Silesian Foothills on the Ostravice River.

On the northeast edge of the municipality is the Baška Reservoir. It was built on the Baštice stream in 1958–1961, on an area of 33 ha (82 acres). The reservoir is used for recreational purposes and as a water source for industry in case of emergency.

== History ==
The first written mention of Baška is from 1434. The village was probably founded several decades earlier. Politically it belonged to the Duchy of Teschen, a fee of the Kingdom of Bohemia, which after 1526 became part of the Habsburg monarchy. In 1573 it was sold as one of 16 villages and the town of Frýdek, and formed a state country split from the Duchy of Teschen.

In 1961, the municipalities of Hodoňovice and Kunčičky u Bašky were joined to Baška.

== Demographics ==
Historical population

Year	Pop.	±%
1869	1,892	—
1880	2,172	+14.8%
1890	2,183	+0.5%
1900	2,440	+11.8%
1910	2,588	+6.1%

Year	Pop.	±%
1921	2,335	−9.8%
1930	3,127	+33.9%
1950	3,034	−3.0%
1961	3,264	+7.6%
1970	3,186	−2.4%

Year	Pop.	±%
1980	3,076	−3.5%
1991	2,874	−6.6%
2001	3,157	+9.8%
2011	3,526	+11.7%
2021	3,882	+10.1%

Source: Censuses

== Transport ==
Baška is located on the Ostrava–Frýdlant nad Ostravicí railway line.

== Sights ==
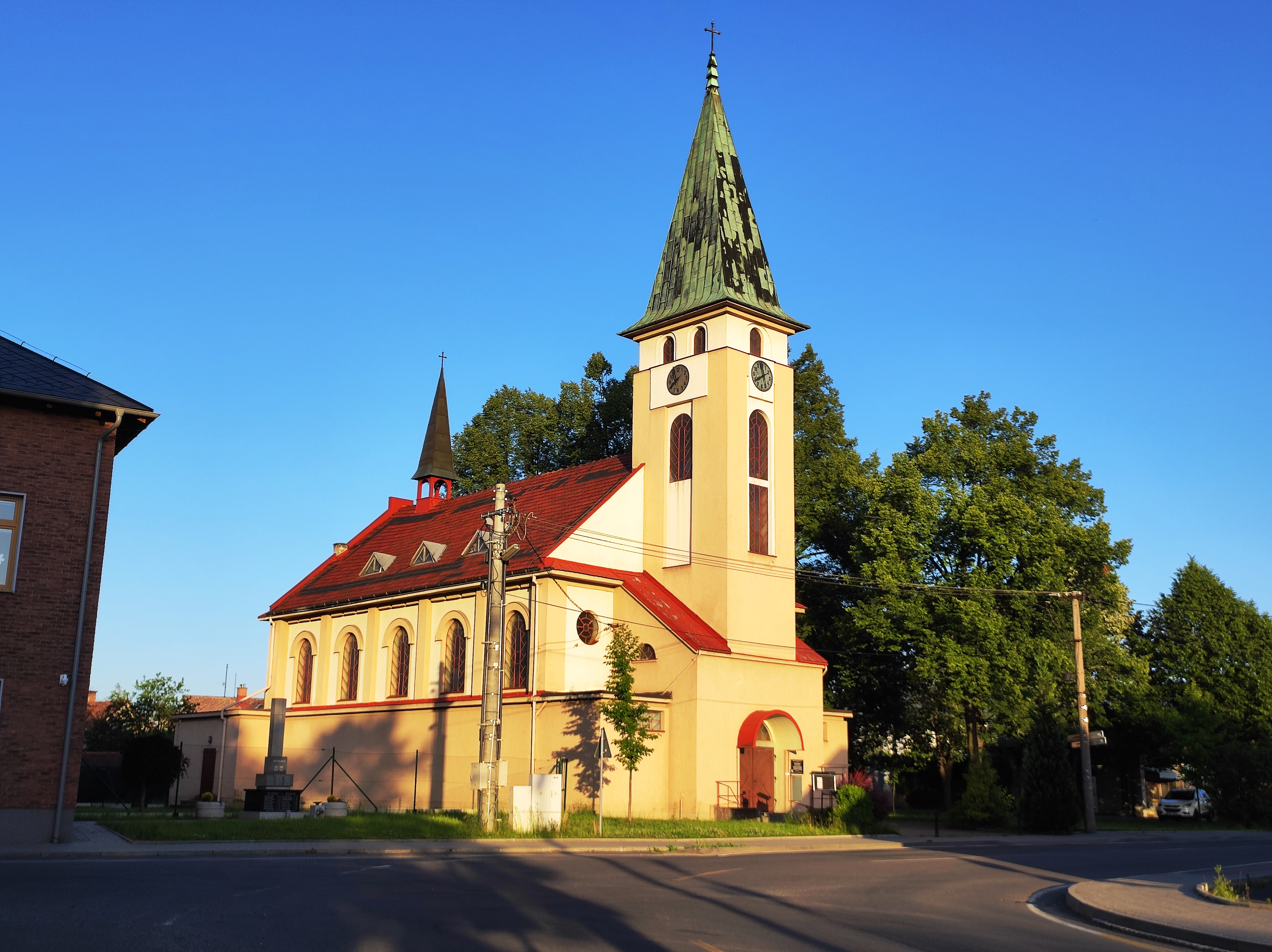
Church of Saint Wenceslaus

The main landmark of Baška is the Church of Saint Wenceslaus. It is a modern church built in 1931–1932.
