= Smrk (Třebíč District) =

- Municipality
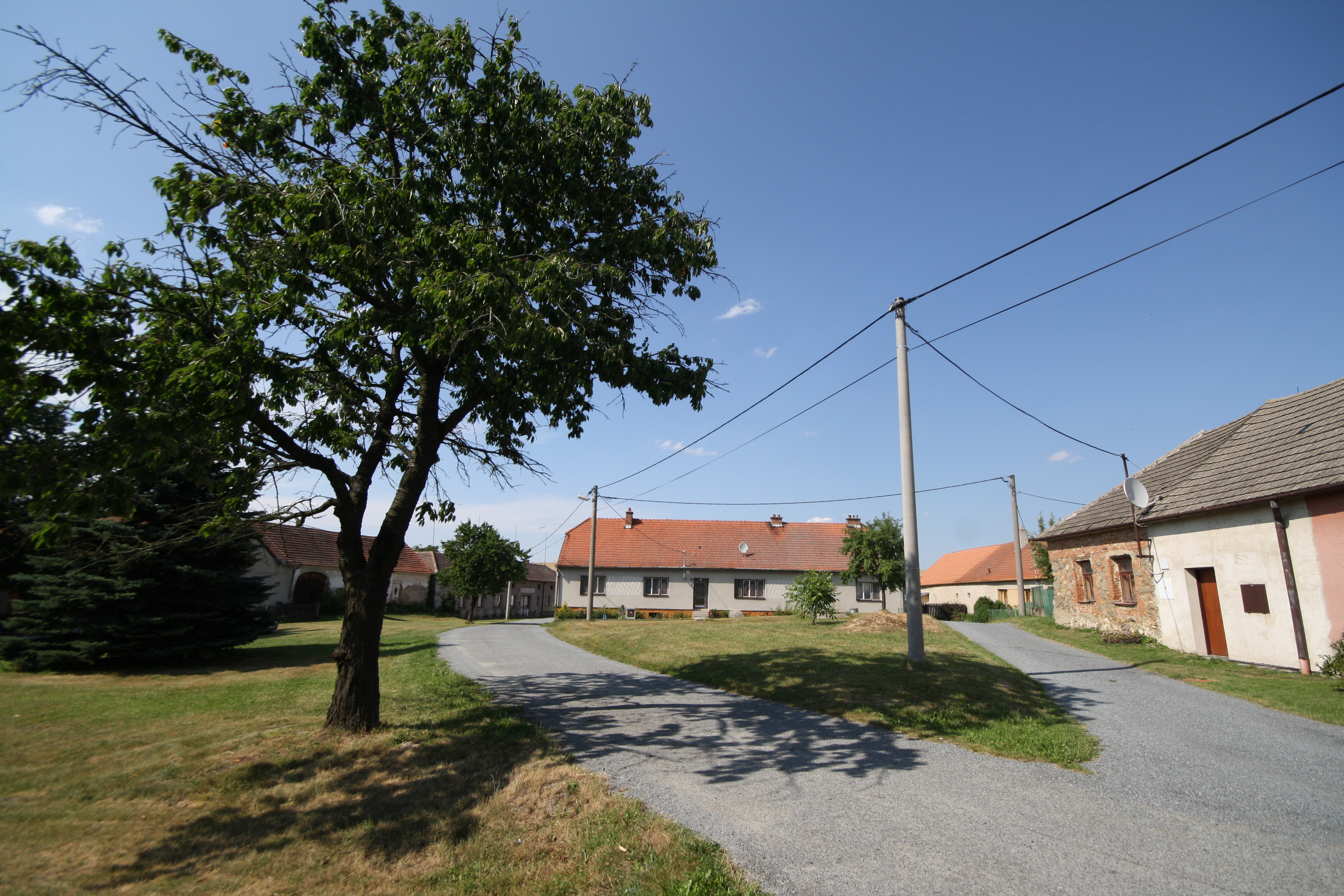
- Centre of Smrk

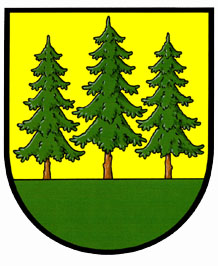
- Flag Coat of arms

- Location in the Czech Republic
- Coordinates: 49°13′32″N 16°0′7″E
- Country: Czech Republic
- Region: Vysočina
- District: Třebíč
- First mentioned: 1104

Area
  - Total: 6.80 km^{2} (2.63 sq mi)
- Elevation: 464 m (1,522 ft)

Population (2026-01-01)
  - Total: 292
  - Density: 42.9/km^{2} (111/sq mi)
- Time zone: UTC+1 (CET)
  - Summer (DST): UTC+2 (CEST)
- Postal code: 675 01
- Website: www.obec-smrk.cz

Smrk is a municipality and village in Třebíč District in the Vysočina Region of the Czech Republic. It has about 300 inhabitants.

Smrk lies approximately 10 kilometres (6 mi) east of Třebíč, 35 km (22 mi) south-east of Jihlava, and 148 km (92 mi) south-east of Prague.

== Demographics ==
Historical population
Year	Pop.	±%
1869	229	—
1880	254	+10.9%
1890	274	+7.9%
1900	273	−0.4%
1910	252	−7.7%
1921	269	+6.7%
1930	288	+7.1%
1950	256	−11.1%
1961	318	+24.2%
1970	317	−0.3%
1980	325	+2.5%
1991	304	−6.5%
2001	271	−10.9%
2011	236	−12.9%
2021	251	+6.4%
Source: Censuses
