= Čeladenka =

River in Czech Republic

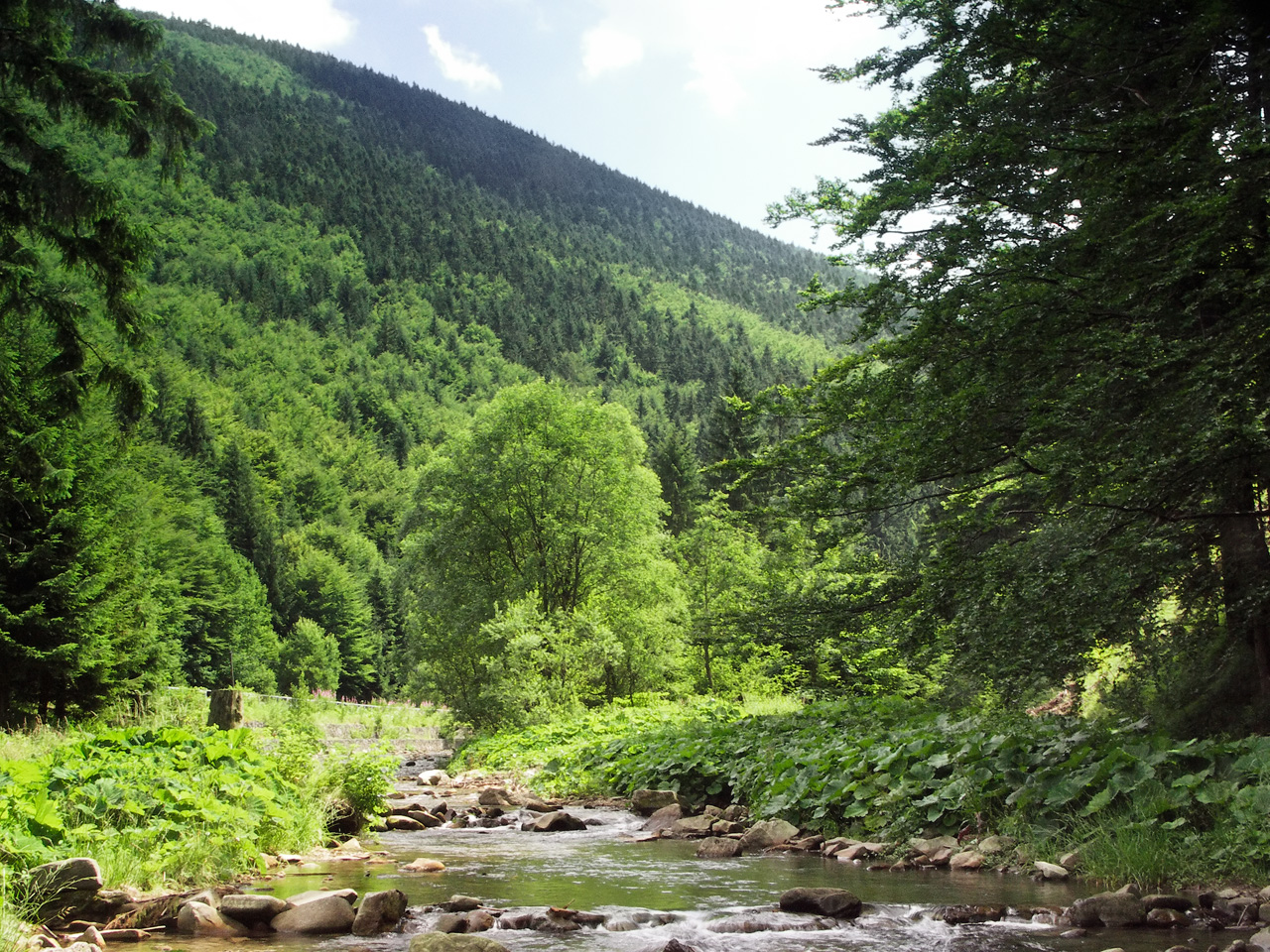
- The Čeladenka under Smrk mountain

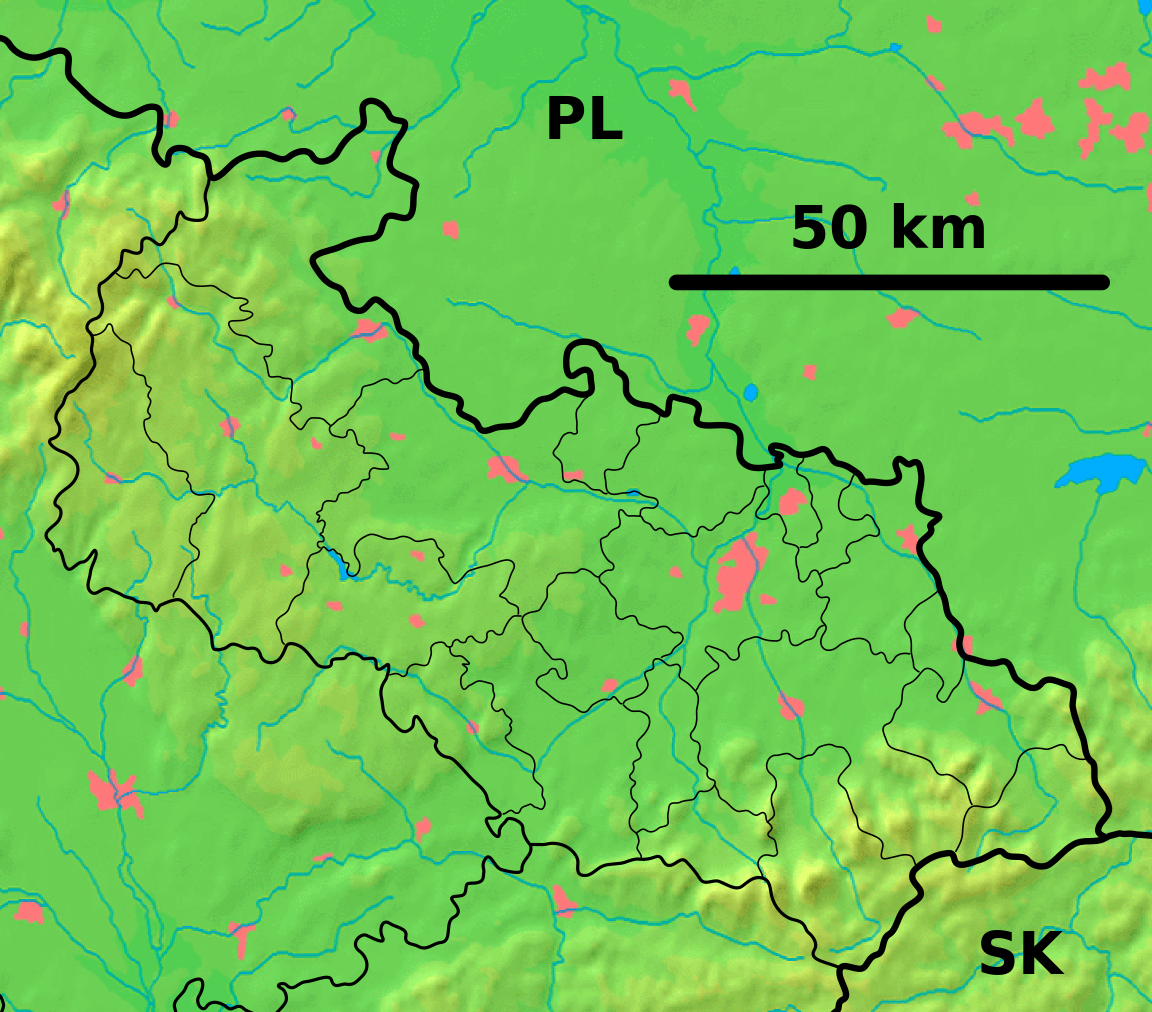
- Location of the mouth of the river Čeladenka (Czech Republic)

Location
- Country: Czech Republic
- Region: Moravian-Silesian

Physical characteristics
- Source
  - location: Moravian-Silesian Beskids
  - coordinates: 49°27′13.5″N 18°22′16.5″E
  - elevation: 850 m (2,790 ft)
- Mouth: Ostravice
  - location: Frýdlant nad Ostravicí
  - coordinates: 49°34′7.3″N 18°21′52.2″E
  - elevation: 375 m (1,230 ft)
- Length: 17 km (11 mi)
- Basin size: 43 km^{2} (17 sq mi)
- Discharge
  - location: mouth
  - average: 1.08 m^{3}/s (38 cu ft/s)

Basin features
- Progression: Ostravice→ Oder→ Baltic Sea

The Čeladenka is a small river in the Moravian-Silesian Region of the Czech Republic, with its source in the Moravian-Silesian Beskids. It flows through the village of Čeladná and enters the Ostravice at Frýdlant nad Ostravicí.

== Sources ==
- Moravskoslezské Beskydy. Tourist map 1:50 000. Shocart: Zlín 2002 ISBN 8072241818
- Najbrt Přemysl: Beskydy a Valašsko. Průvodce. Olympia: Praha 1974
- Beskydy. Turistický průvodce ČSSR, vol. 8. Olympia: Praha 1982
