= Ostravice (river) =

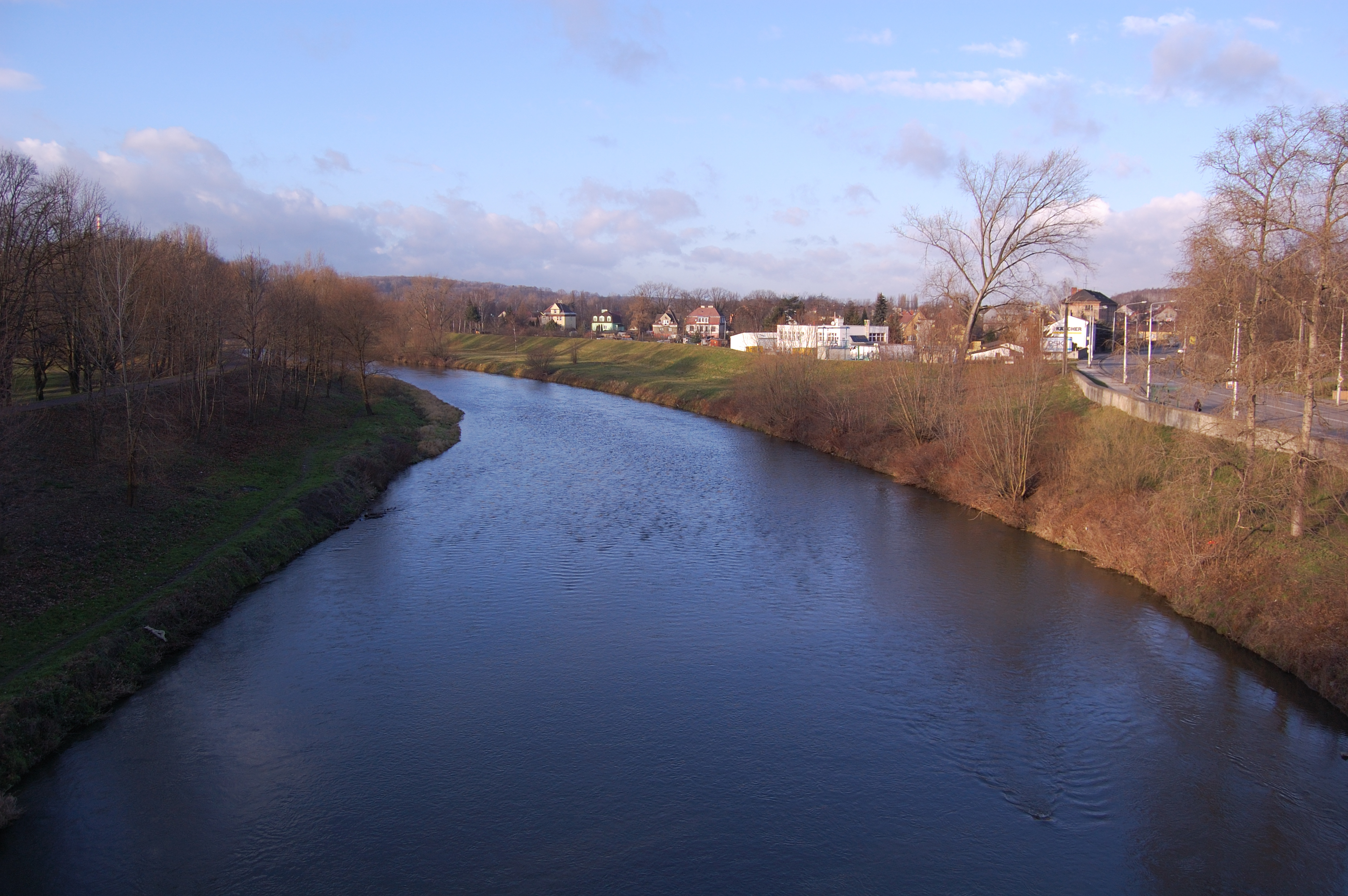
- The Ostravice in Ostrava

Location
- Country: Czech Republic
- Region: Moravian-Silesian

Physical characteristics
- Source: Bílá Ostravice
  - location: Bílá, Hostýn-Vsetín Mountains
  - coordinates: 49°24′45″N 18°22′17″E
  - elevation: 751 m (2,464 ft)
- Mouth
  - location: Oder
  - coordinates: 49°52′10″N 18°16′50″E
  - elevation: 199 m (653 ft)
- Length: 64.7 km (40.2 mi)
- Basin size: 826.7 km^{2} (319.2 sq mi)
- Discharge
  - average: 15.4 m^{3}/s (540 cu ft/s) near estuary

Basin features
- Progression: Oder→ Baltic Sea

The Ostravice (Czech pronunciation: [ˈostravɪtsɛ]; Polish: Ostrawica, German: Ostrawitza) is a river in the Czech Republic, a right tributary of the Oder River. It flows through the Moravian-Silesian Region. It is formed by the confluence of the Bílá Ostravice and Černá Ostravice streams. Together with the Bílá Ostravice, which is its main source, the Ostravice is 64.7 km (40.2 mi) long. Without the Bílá Ostravice, it is 54.8 km (34.1 mi) long.

== Etymology ==
The name is derived from the Czech word ostrá (literally 'sharp', but here figuratively meaning 'fast flowing'). The river was initially called Ostrá. The city of Ostrava was named after the river.

The sources of the river are called Bílá Ostravice ('white Ostravice') and Černá Ostravice ('black Ostravice'). The colours in the names of the rivers most often appeared according to the nature of the river bed (white = stony river bed, black = muddy river bed).

== Characteristic ==
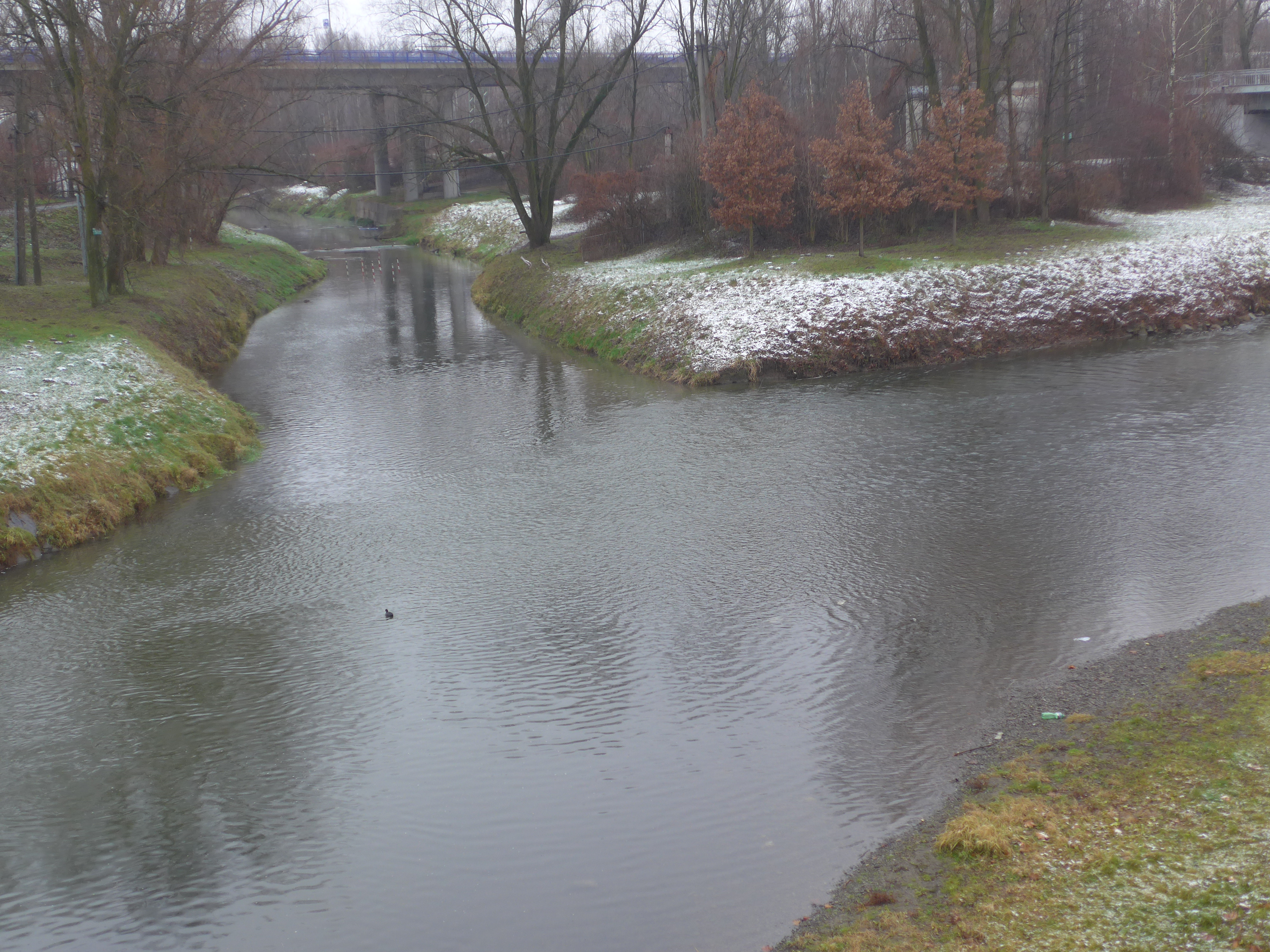
Confluence of the Ostravice (right) and Lučina

From a water management point of view, the Ostravice and Bílá Ostravice are two different rivers with separate numbering of river kilometres. In a broader point of view, the Ostravice (as Bílá Ostravice) originates in the territory of Bílá on the border between the Hostýn-Vsetín Mountains and Moravian-Silesian Beskids at an elevation of 751 m (2,464 ft) and flows to Ostrava, where it enters the Oder River at an elevation of 199 m (653 ft). It is 64.7 km (40.2 mi) long. Its drainage basin has an area of 826.7 km^{2} (319.2 sq mi). The name Ostravice is used from the confluence of the Bílá Ostravice with the Černá Ostravice on the municipal border of Bílá and from this point to the confluence with the Oder, the river is 54.8 km (34.1 mi) long.

The sources and longest tributaries of the Ostravice are:

Tributary	Length (km)	River km	Side
Lučina	38.6	4.5	right
Morávka	29.6	24.9	right
Olešná	21.5	15.2	left
Čeladenka	17.3	37.1	left
Baštice	11.9	25.9	right
Bystrý potok	10.8	27.2	right
Bílá Ostravice	9.9	54.8	–
Černá Ostravice	9.4	54.8	right

== Course ==
The largest settlement on the river is the city of Ostrava. The river flows through the municipal territories of Bílá, Staré Hamry, Ostravice, Frýdlant nad Ostravicí, Pržno, Baška, Staré Město, Frýdek-Místek, Sviadnov, Žabeň, Paskov, Řepiště, Vratimov and Ostrava.

In terms of natural regions, the river flows through the Moravian-Silesian Beskids, Moravian-Silesian Foothills and Ostrava Basin. The Bílá Ostravice springs in the area of the Hostýn-Vsetín Mountains, but immediately leaves this region.

== Bodies of water ==
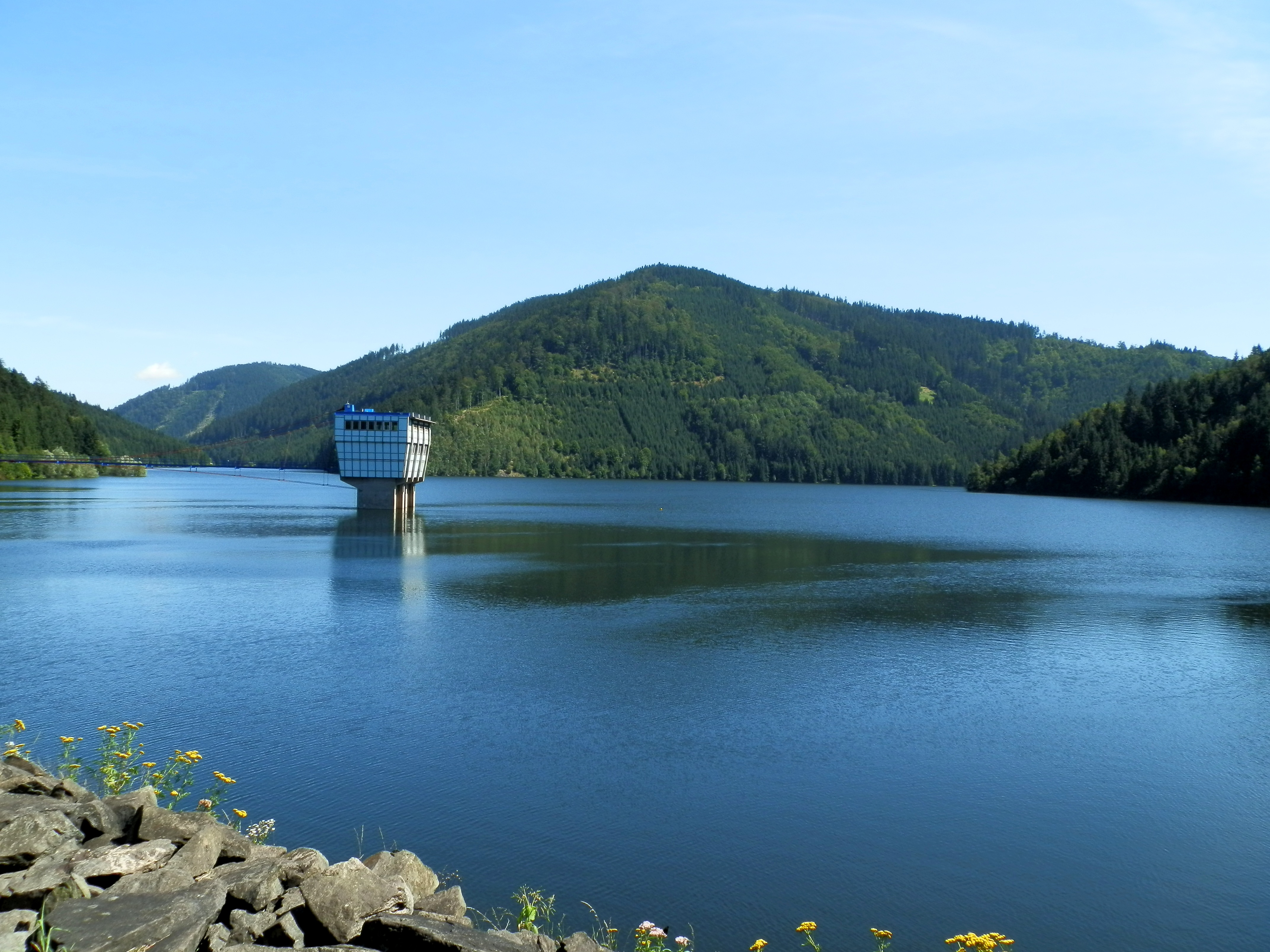
Šance Reservoir

There are 598 bodies of water in the basin area. The largest of them is the Šance Reservoir with an area of 306 ha (760 acres), built on the Ostravice. It was built in 1964–1969 and its primary purpose is to supply Ostrava and its surroundings with drinking water and protect the area behind the reservoir against floods.

== Fauna ==
Common species of fish in the river are trout, grayling and common barbel. Among the protected animal species are the common minnow, burbot, European bullhead, alpine bullhead and brook lamprey. The river is a nesting place for the common kingfisher. The Eurasian otter rarely occurs on the middle course of the river.

== History ==
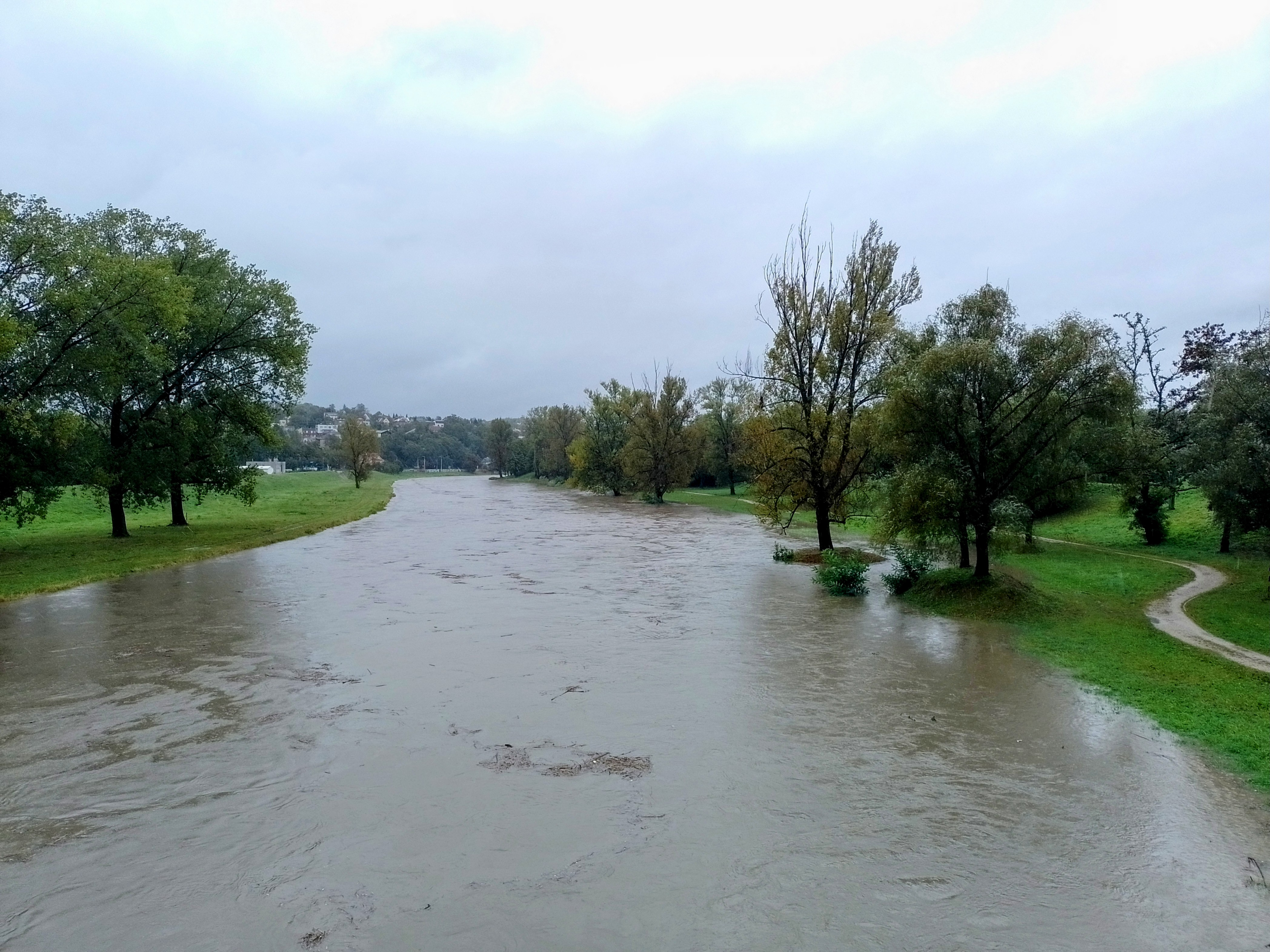
The Ostravice in Ostrava during the 2024 floods

The Ostravice partly formed the border between historical lands of Moravia (left bank) and Cieszyn Silesia (right bank). It was first agreed as such in 1261 by a special treaty between Duke Władysław Opolski and King Ottokar II. Later it was confirmed on 2 August 1297 between Duke Mieszko I and Dětřich, bishop of Olomouc. It lost importance as a state border in 1327, when the Duchy of Teschen became a fee of the Kingdom of Bohemia.

Before the construction of reservoirs in the basin, the Ostravice was one of the most fluctuating rivers in the Czech Republic in terms of flow, and its high peak flows in combination with the relief were the cause of catastrophic floods. Among the worst floods were those in 1902 and 1903, and after them came a period of gradual flow regulation, culminating in the construction of the Šance Reservoir on the Ostravice, Žermanice Reservoir on the Lučina, Morávka Reservoir on the Morávka and Olešná Reservoir onn the Olešná.

== Tourism ==
The Ostravice is suitable for river tourism only when water is released from Šance Reservoir, which is once or twice a year. About 7 km (4.3 mi) of the river is navigable.

== See also ==
- List of rivers of the Czech Republic
