= Moravian-Silesian Beskids =

Mountain range in the Czech Republic and Slovakia

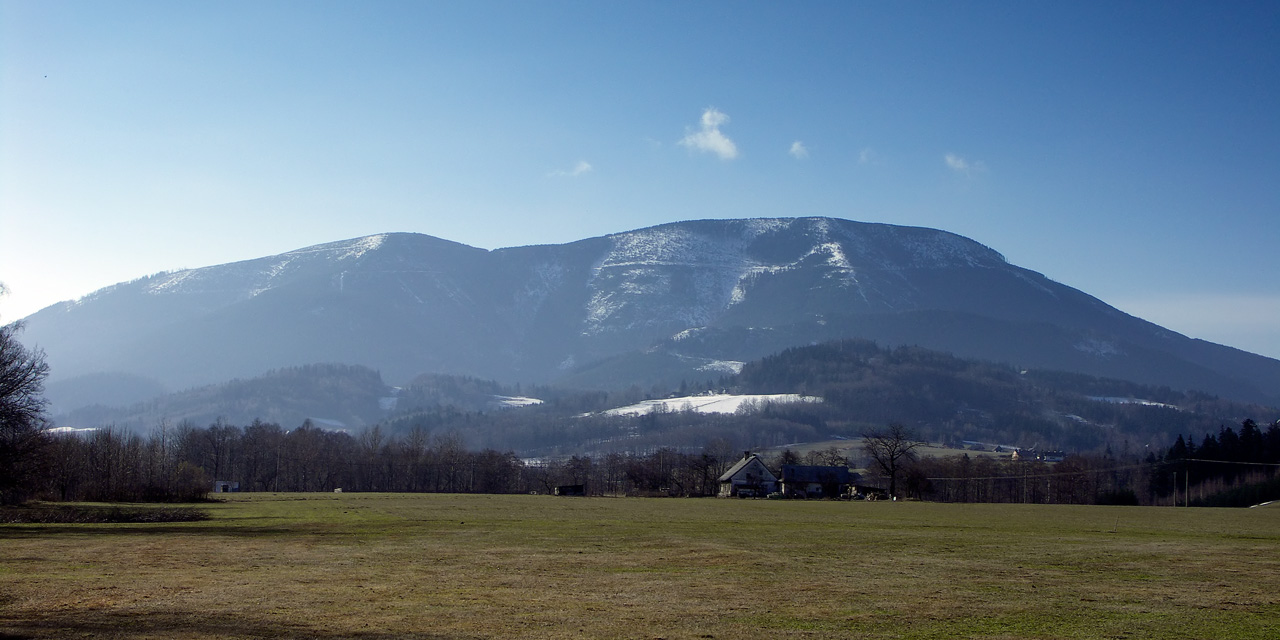
- Smrk mountain in early spring

Highest point
- Peak: Lysá hora
- Elevation: 1,323 m (4,341 ft)
- Coordinates: 49°32′45″N 18°26′51″E

Naming
- Native name: Moravskoslezské Beskydy (Czech)

Geography
- Location within Czech Republic
- Countries: Czech Republic and Slovakia
- Regions: Moravian-Silesian, Czech Republic and Žilina, Slovakia
- Parent range: Western Beskids

Geology
- Orogeny: Alpine
- Rock age: Miocene
- Rock type: Godulian sandstone

The Moravian-Silesian Beskids (Czech: Moravskoslezské Beskydy, Slovak: Moravsko-sliezske Beskydy) is a mountain range in the Czech Republic with a small part reaching to Slovakia. It lies on the historical division between Moravia and Silesia, hence the name. It is part of the Western Beskids within the Outer Western Carpathians.

== Background ==
The mountains were created during the Alpine Orogeny in the Cenozoic. Geologically, they consist mainly of flysch deposits. In the north, they steeply rise nearly 1,000 m (3,300 ft) over a rather flat landscape; in the south, they slowly merge with the Javorníky. In the south-west, they are separated from the Vsetínské vrchy by the Rožnovská Bečva valley; in the north-east, the Jablunkov Pass separates them from the Silesian Beskids.

The highest point is Lysá hora mountain at 1,323 m (4,341 ft), which is one of the rainiest places in the Czech Republic with around 1,500 mm (59 in) of precipitation a year. Many legends are bound to Radhošť Mountain, 1,129 m (3,704 ft), which is one of the most visited places in the mountains together with the nearby Pustevny resort.

Smrk, with a height of 1,276 m (4,186 ft), is the second highest summit of the range. Its northern slope steeply rises from the surrounding lowlands and is separated from the rest of the mountains by the deep Ostravice River (in the east) and Čeladenka (in the west) river valleys; in the south, it merges in the lower Zadní hory (i.e. Rear mountains) area.

The Moravian-Silesian Beskids create the largest part of the Beskydy Landscape Protected Area. The mountains are 80% forested, though mainly by plantations of spruce which were in some parts severely damaged by emissions from the Ostrava industrial region. Originally, the mountains were covered by mixed forest with dominant beech which are preserved in many places. Recently, permanent occurrence of all three large Central European carnivores – lynx, bear and wolf – have been confirmed in the area.

There are many popular holiday resorts for both winter and summer activities, with centers in the towns under the mountains (Frýdlant nad Ostravicí, Frenštát pod Radhoštěm, Rožnov pod Radhoštěm) and also in smaller resorts, hamlets and chalets throughout the mountains, especially on the ridges. Parts of two euroregions, the Beskydy/Beskidy and Těšínské Slezsko/Śląsk Cieszyński, reach into the Moravian-Silesian Beskids.

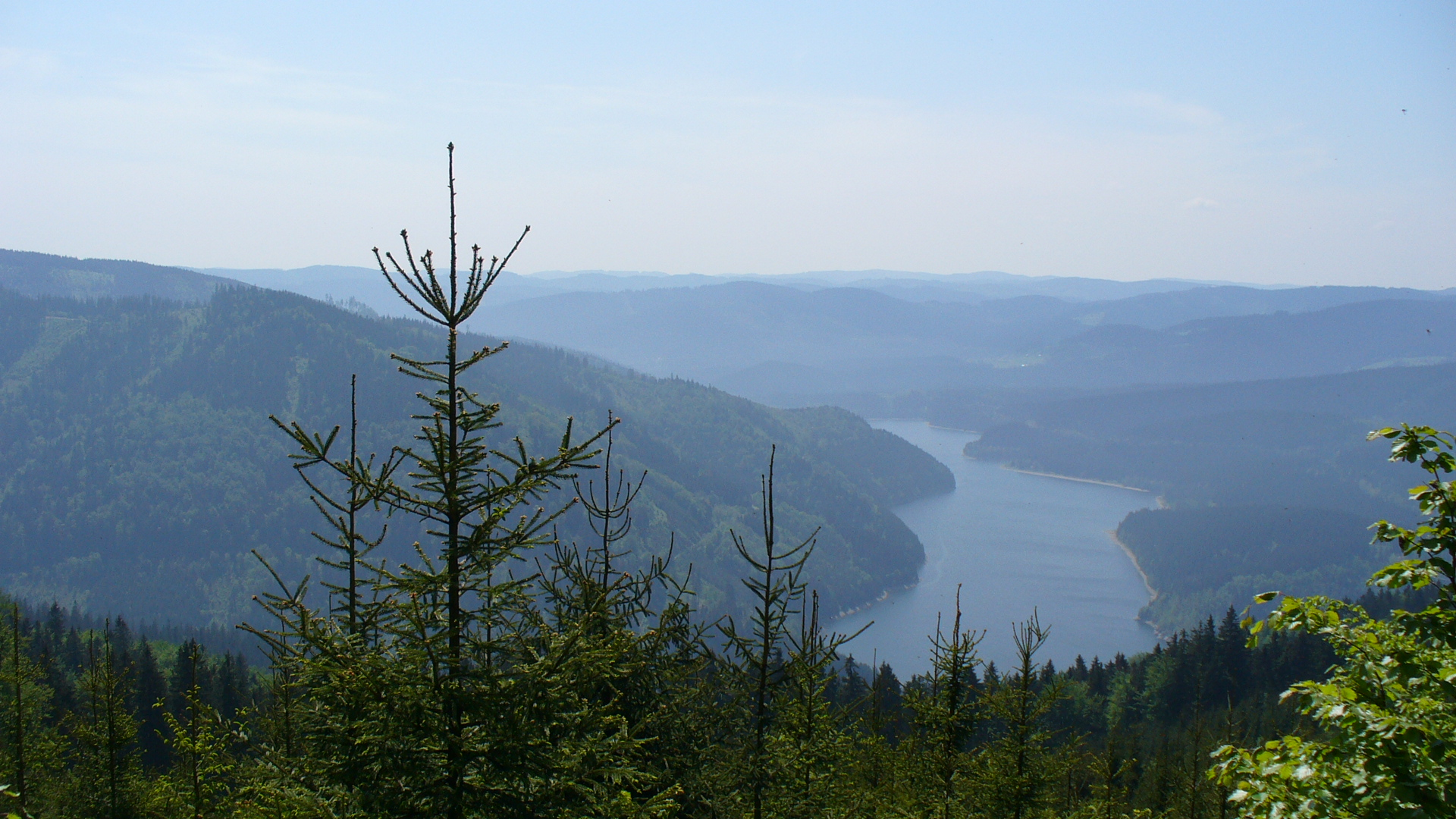
Šance Reservoir on the Ostravice River in the Moravian-Silesian Beskids

== Bibliography ==
- Ludvík, Marcel (1987). Beskydy, Turistický průvodce ČSSR. Prague: Olympia. 27-031-87.
- Rohlík, Jiří (2001). Moravskoslezské Beskydy, Soubor turistických map 1:50 000. Prague: TRASA, s.r.o. ISBN 80-85999-29-3.
- CHKO Beskydy Management (15 February 2003). "Chráněná krajinná oblast Beskydy". Archived from the original on 6 April 2003.
