= Pražmo =

- Municipality
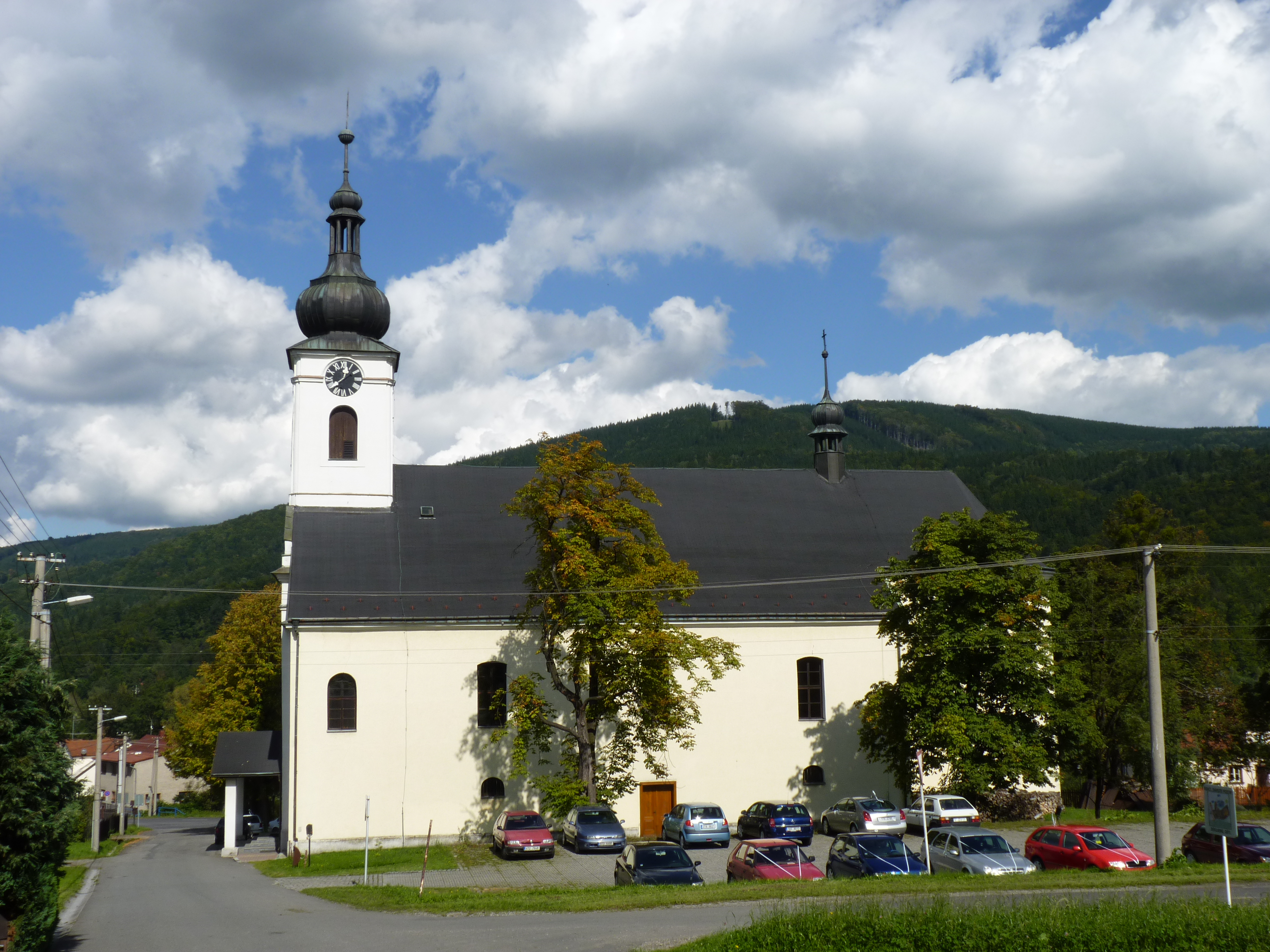
- Church of Saint John of Nepomuk

- Flag Coat of arms

- Location in the Czech Republic
- Coordinates: 49°36′31″N 18°29′10″E
- Country: Czech Republic
- Region: Moravian-Silesian
- District: Frýdek-Místek
- Founded: 1777

Area
  - Total: 3.55 km^{2} (1.37 sq mi)
- Elevation: 435 m (1,427 ft)

Population (2026-01-01)
  - Total: 890
  - Density: 250/km^{2} (650/sq mi)
- Time zone: UTC+1 (CET)
  - Summer (DST): UTC+2 (CEST)
- Postal code: 739 04
- Website: www.prazmo.cz

Pražmo is a municipality and village in Frýdek-Místek District in the Moravian-Silesian Region of the Czech Republic. It has about 900 inhabitants.

== Geography ==
Pražmo is located about 12 kilometres (7 mi) southeast of Frýdek-Místek and 26 km (16 mi) southeast of Ostrava, in the historical region of Cieszyn Silesia. It lies mostly in the Moravian-Silesian Beskids, only the northern part lies in the Moravian-Silesian Foothills. The highest point is the mountain Obora at 709 m (2,326 ft) above sea level. The municipality is situated between the Morávka and Mohelnice rivers near their confluence, however, none of this rivers flows through the municipal territory.

== History ==
Pražmo was established in between Raškovice and Morávka in 1777 of the initiative of the owner of the Friedek state country, Jan Nepomuk of Pražma, hence the name of the village. After World War I and fall of Austria-Hungary, it became a part of Czechoslovakia.

== Demographics ==
Historical population

Year	Pop.	±%
1869	619	—
1880	548	−11.5%
1890	546	−0.4%
1900	530	−2.9%
1910	471	−11.1%

Year	Pop.	±%
1921	462	−1.9%
1930	478	+3.5%
1950	464	−2.9%
1961	468	+0.9%
1970	476	+1.7%

Year	Pop.	±%
1980	735	+54.4%
1991	1,023	+39.2%
2001	1,017	−0.6%
2011	951	−6.5%
2021	878	−7.7%

Source: Censuses

== Transport ==
There are no railways or major roads passing through the municipality.

== Sights ==
The main landmark of Pražmo is the Church of Saint John of Nepomuk. It was built in 1807–1817.

== Twin towns – sister cities ==
Pražmo is twinned with:

- Niemodlin, Poland
