= Nošovice =

- Municipality
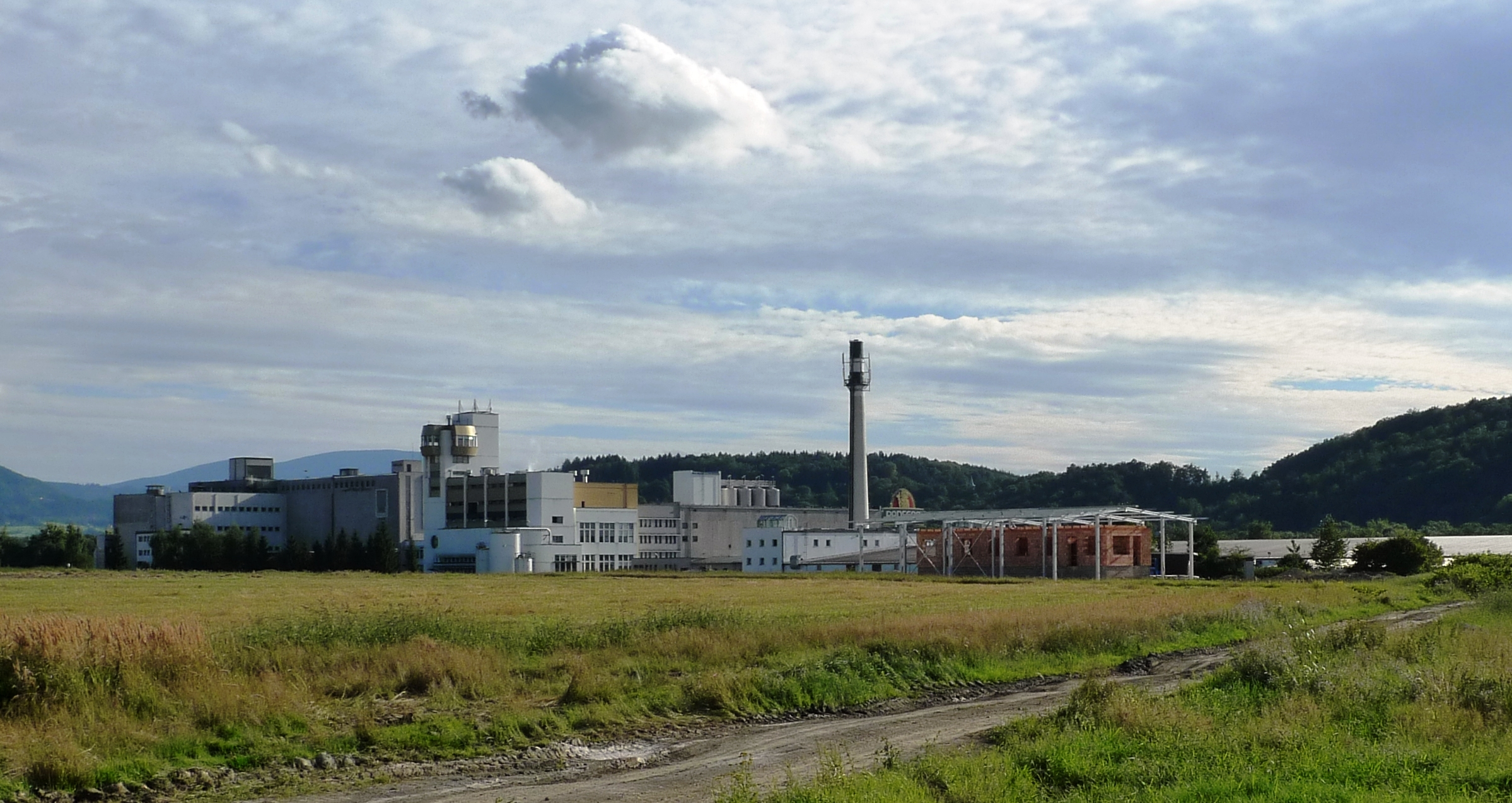
- Radegast Brewery

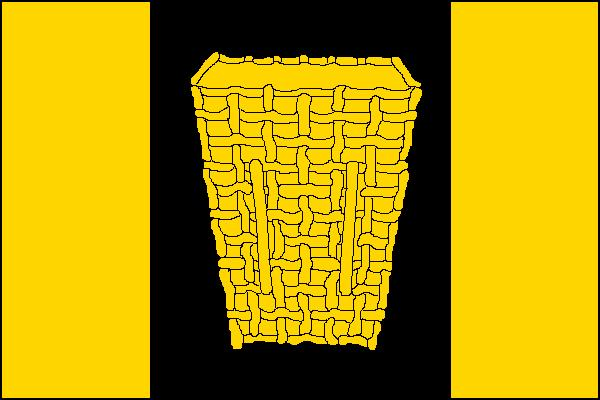
- Flag Coat of arms

- Location in the Czech Republic
- Coordinates: 49°39′39″N 18°25′35″E
- Country: Czech Republic
- Region: Moravian-Silesian
- District: Frýdek-Místek
- First mentioned: 1573

Area
  - Total: 6.47 km^{2} (2.50 sq mi)
- Elevation: 346 m (1,135 ft)

Population (2026-01-01)
  - Total: 1,032
  - Density: 160/km^{2} (413/sq mi)
- Time zone: UTC+1 (CET)
  - Summer (DST): UTC+2 (CEST)
- Postal code: 739 51
- Website: www.nosovice.cz

Nošovice (German: Noschowitz, Polish: Noszowice) is a municipality and village in Frýdek-Místek District in the Moravian-Silesian Region of the Czech Republic. It has about 1,000 inhabitants.

== Etymology ==
The name originates from lokator Potmienoss, who settled with his people in a desolate place between the villages Nižní Lhoty and Dobrá and founded the settlement. Later the leading Potmie- part of the name was dropped.

== Geography ==
Nošovice is located about 5 kilometres (3 mi) east of Frýdek-Místek and 18 km (11 mi) southeast of Ostrava. It lies in the historical region of Cieszyn Silesia, in the Moravian-Silesian Foothills. The village is located on the right bank of the Morávka River. The area between the river and the village is protected as the Skalická Morávka National Nature Monument.

== History ==
The first written mention of Nošovice (as Potmienossowicze or Potměnošovice) is from 1573, when it a part of the Friedeck state country and the country was split from the Duchy of Teschen, however settlement of the village and deforestation began around 1447. Politically the Friedeck state country was a part of the Kingdom of Bohemia. The name of Nošovice was used for the first time in 1664, when it was a village with about 220 inhabitants.

Nošovice was traditionally an agricultural village. Linen was also woven here and in the early 19th century, there was a factory for military bottles.

After World War I and fall of Austria-Hungary, Nošovice became a part of Czechoslovakia. In March 1939, it became a part of Protectorate of Bohemia and Moravia. After World War II, it was restored to Czechoslovakia.

== Demographics ==
Historical population

Year	Pop.	±%
1869	665	—
1880	707	+6.3%
1890	745	+5.4%
1900	793	+6.4%
1910	818	+3.2%

Year	Pop.	±%
1921	821	+0.4%
1930	815	−0.7%
1950	785	−3.7%
1961	903	+15.0%
1970	830	−8.1%

Year	Pop.	±%
1980	975	+17.5%
1991	921	−5.5%
2001	948	+2.9%
2011	937	−1.2%
2021	972	+3.7%

Source: Censuses

== Economy ==
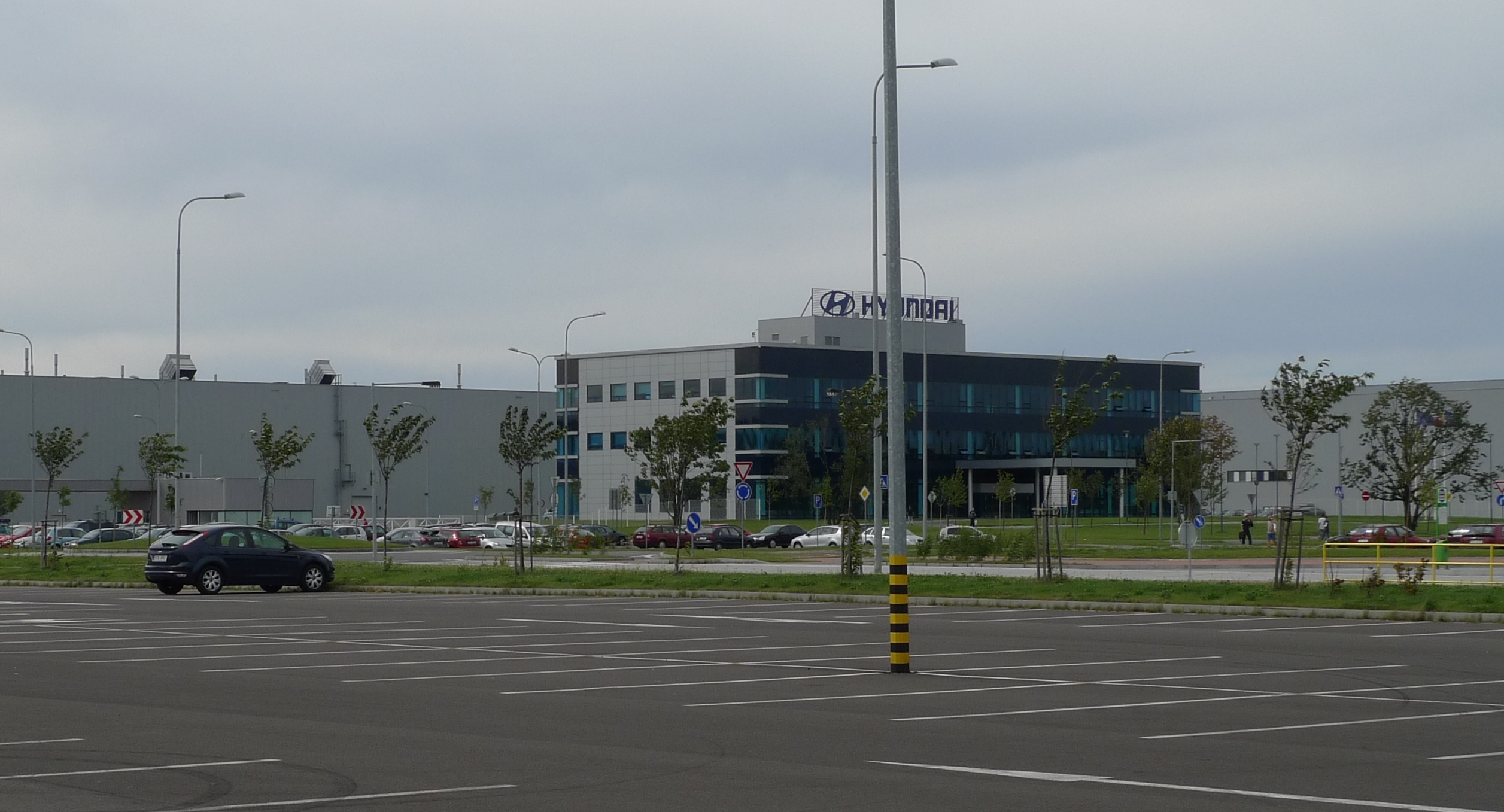
Factory of the Hyundai Motor Company

The factory of the Hyundai Motor Company was built here in 2006. The branch known as Hyundai Motor Manufacturing Czech is one of the main employers in the region.

Nošovice is also known for agriculture and the food and beverage industry. The Radegast brewery is located here, and the local agricultural cooperative focuses on the production of milk, pork, potatoes and sauerkraut. Nošovice Sauerkraut has been a protected designation of origin since 2010.

== Transport ==
The D48 motorway (part of the European route E462) from Frýdek-Místek to Český Těšín runs through the northern part of the municipality.

== Sights ==
There are no protected cultural monuments in the municipality. Among the monuments of local importance are a memorial of fallen in World Wars, three small chapels, a column shrine and a stone cross.
