= Příbram meteorite =

1959 meteorite in Czechoslovakia

Coordinates: 49°39′38.26″N 14°11′47.64″E

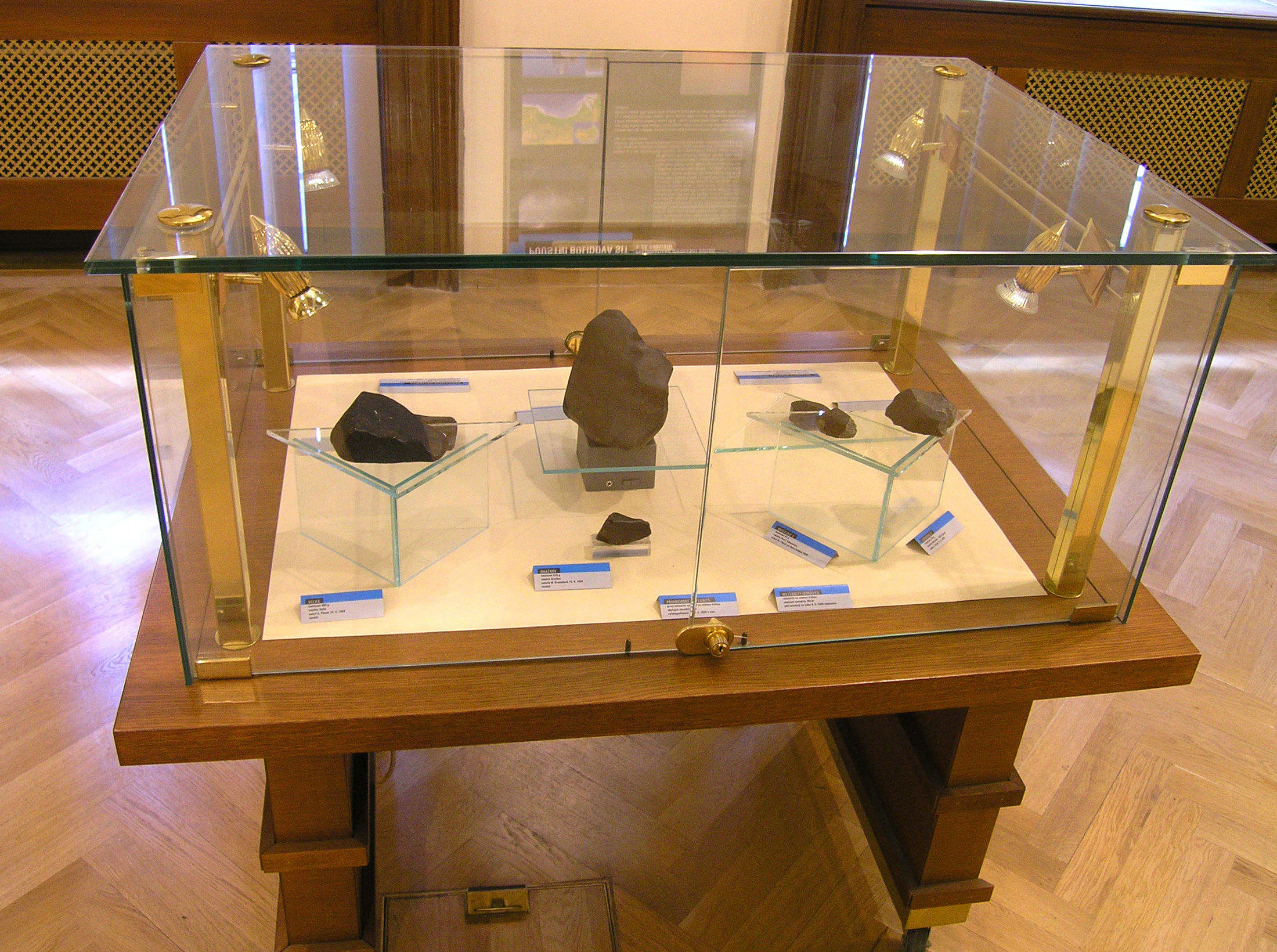
- Pieces of Příbram and Morávka meteorites
- Type: Chondrite
- Class: Ordinary chondrite
- Group: H5
- Country: Czechoslovakia
- Region: near Příbram
- Observed fall: Yes
- Fall date: 1959-04-07 19:30
- Found date: 1959-04-09 (Luhy)
- TKW: 5.73 kilograms (12.6 lb)

The Příbram meteorite fell on 7 April 1959 east of Příbram, former Czechoslovakia (now the Czech Republic). Four pieces were found, the largest having a mass of 4.425 kilograms (9.76 lb) (near the village of Luhy, Dolní Hbity municipality).

Příbram was the first meteorite whose trajectory was tracked by multiple cameras recording the associated fireball. This allowed its trajectory to be calculated leading to a determination of its orbit and aiding its recovery.

== Pieces ==
Four pieces were found with a total weight of 5.730 kg (12.63 lb) out of an estimated 53 kg (117 lb) weight before break-up. The largest piece found was probably only the second-largest overall. These four pieces were subsequently named after the villages near which they were found:

- 4.425 kilograms (9.76 lb) Luhy (Dolní Hbity municipality)
- 0.772 kilograms (1.70 lb) Velká (Kamýk nad Vltavou municipality)
- 0.428 kilograms (0.94 lb) Hojšín (Svatý Jan municipality)
- 0.105 kilograms (0.23 lb) Drážkov (Svatý Jan municipality)

All pieces are on display in the Czech National Museum in Prague.

== History ==
The fall was preceded by a bright bolide seen throughout what was then western Czechoslovakia. The light extended to 50 km (31 mi). At an altitude around 13 km (8.1 mi), the meteor broke up. One loud and several quieter explosions were heard. The meteorite was found to have penetrated ploughed land to a depth of 20 cm (7.9 in), bounced, and fallen 30 cm (12 in) further on.

== See also ==
- Glossary of meteoritics
- Morávka meteorite – 2020 meteorite in Czechia
