= Komorní Lhotka =

Komorní Lhotka Ligotka Kameralna
- Municipality
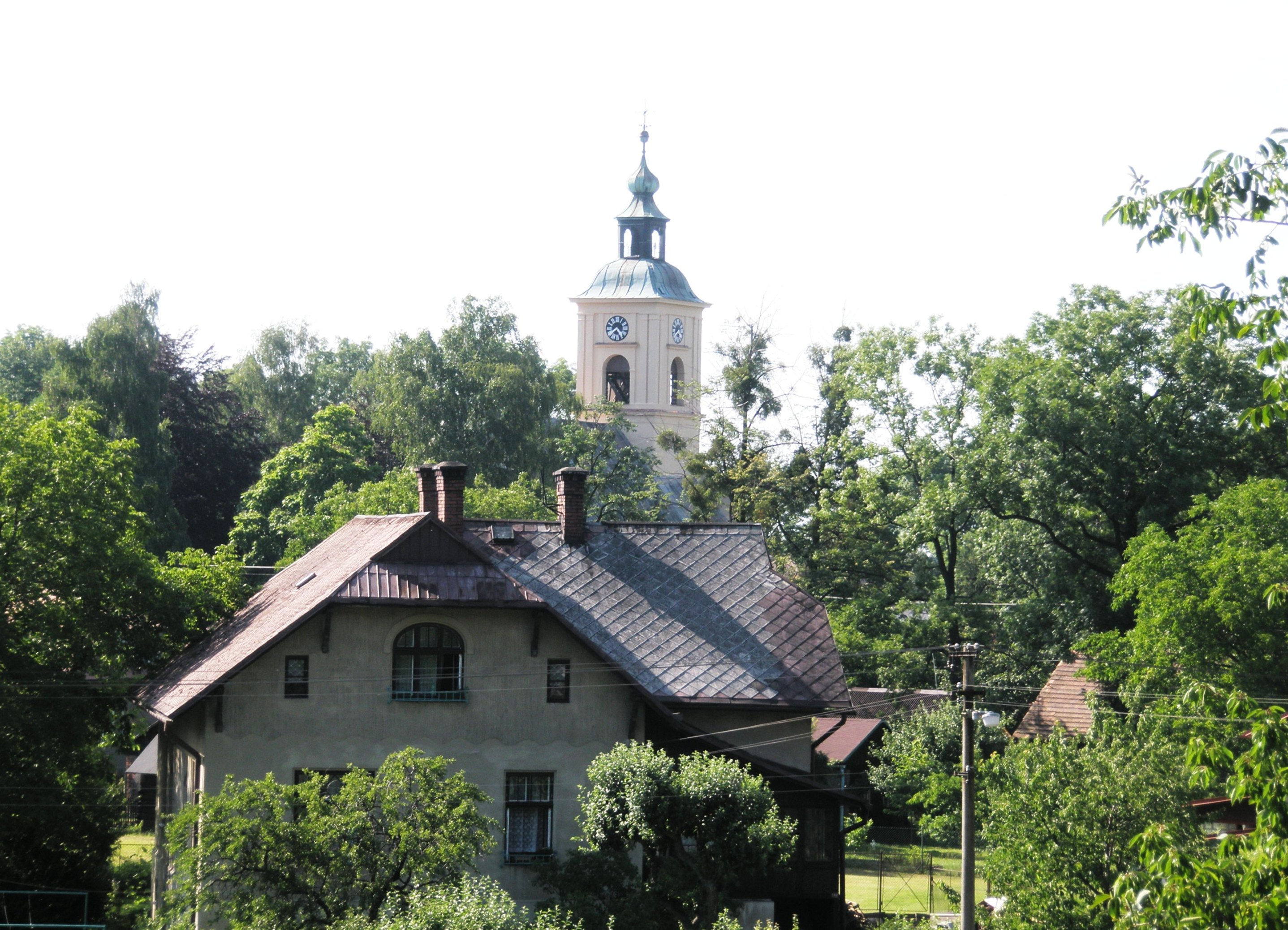
- View of Komorní Lhotka

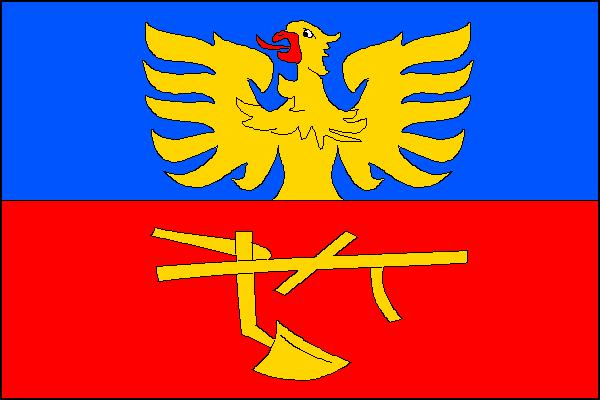
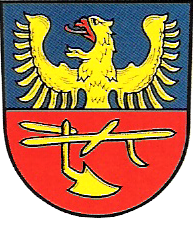
- Flag Coat of arms

- Location in the Czech Republic
- Coordinates: 49°39′29″N 18°31′40″E
- Country: Czech Republic
- Region: Moravian-Silesian
- District: Frýdek-Místek
- First mentioned: 1455

Area
  - Total: 19.88 km^{2} (7.68 sq mi)
- Elevation: 410 m (1,350 ft)

Population (2026-01-01)
  - Total: 1,517
  - Density: 76.31/km^{2} (197.6/sq mi)
- Time zone: UTC+1 (CET)
  - Summer (DST): UTC+2 (CEST)
- Postal code: 739 53
- Website: www.komorni-lhotka.cz

Komorní Lhotka (Polish: Ligotka Kameralna, German: Kameral Ellgoth) is a municipality and village in Frýdek-Místek District in the Moravian-Silesian Region of the Czech Republic. It has about 1,500 inhabitants. The municipality has a significant Polish minority. The folk architecture in the village is well preserved and is protected as a village monument zone.

== Etymology ==
Lhotka is a diminutive form of Lhota, which is a common name for villages in both Czech Republic and western Poland. The word refers to the medieval custom of village founders being exempt from paying duties to their lords for a period of 5–8 years. Komorní Lhotka was first mentioned as Buczkowa Lhota, meaning "Buczek's Lhota". Later the attribute was replaced or dropped and eventually in the 19th century, it became known as Komorní (Polish Kameralna and German Cammeral) as it was belonging to Teschener Kammer.

== Geography ==
Komorní Lhotka is located about 12 kilometres (7 mi) east of Frýdek-Místek and 22 km (14 mi) southeast of Ostrava. It lies in the historical region of Cieszyn Silesia. About three quarters of the municipality lies in the Moravian-Silesian Beskids and within the Beskydy Protected Landscape Area. The northern part of the municipality lies in the Moravian-Silesian Foothills. The highest point is the mountain Ropičanka at 918 km (570 mi) above sea level. The Stonávka River originates in the municipal territory and flows across the municipality.

== History ==
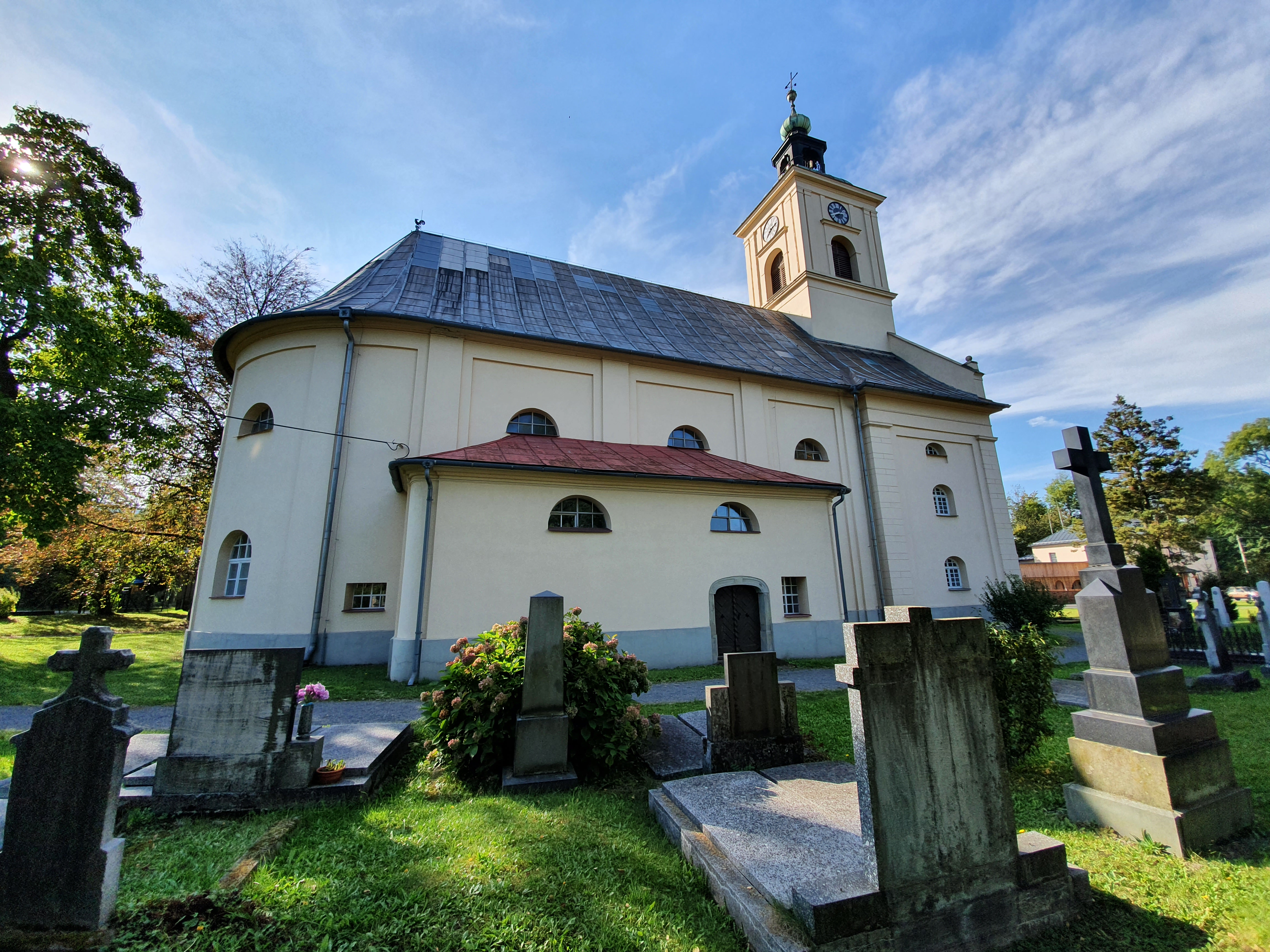
Lutheran church

The first written mention of Komorní Lhotka is from 1455. Politically the village belonged initially to the Duchy of Teschen. In the second half of the 17th century, the village was colonised by the Vlachs. The livelihood of the population was agriculture (especially flax growing) and pastoralism. in the 19th century, agriculture gradually disappeared. A railway was introduced into the municipality. Residents began working in the surrounding towns, especially in steelworks and mines.

After issuing the Patent of Toleration in 1781 the local citizens subsequently organised a local Lutheran parish as one of over ten in the region.

After Revolutions of 1848 in the Austrian Empire, a modern municipal division was introduced in the re-established Austrian Silesia. The village as a municipality was subscribed to the political and legal district of Cieszyn. According to the censuses conducted in 1880–1910 the population of the municipality dropped from 1,164 in 1880 to 1,038 in 1910 with a majority being native Polish-speakers (99.2–100%) accompanied by a small German-speaking minority (at most 12 or 1.3% in 1880). In terms of religion in 1910 the majority were Protestants (88.2%), followed by Roman Catholics (11.2%) and Jews (3 people).

After World War I, Polish–Czechoslovak War and the division of Cieszyn Silesia in 1920, the municipality became a part of Czechoslovakia. Following the Munich Agreement, in October 1938 together with the Trans-Olza region it was annexed by Poland, administratively adjoined to Cieszyn County of Silesian Voivodeship. It was then annexed by Nazi Germany at the beginning of World War II. After the war it was restored to Czechoslovakia.

== Demographics ==
According to the 2021 Census, Polish minority makes up 13.8% of the population.

Historical population

Year	Pop.	±%
1869	1,146	—
1880	1,164	+1.6%
1890	1,129	−3.0%
1900	1,020	−9.7%
1910	1,038	+1.8%

Year	Pop.	±%
1921	1,054	+1.5%
1930	1,066	+1.1%
1950	1,063	−0.3%
1961	1,082	+1.8%
1970	1,095	+1.2%

Year	Pop.	±%
1980	1,111	+1.5%
1991	996	−10.4%
2001	1,097	+10.1%
2011	1,250	+13.9%
2021	1,521	+21.7%

Source: Censuses

== Economy ==
Since 1860, Komorní Lhotka has been known for its minor spa, using herbal baths for treating problems with back and cervical vertebrae.

== Transport ==
There are no railways or major roads passing through the municipality.

== Sights ==
There are two church buildings in the municipality. The Lutheran church was built in 1782. The Church of the Divine Heart of the Lord is a Catholic church, built in 1885 for summer visitors.

The historic centre of the village is protected as a village monument zone. There are preserved wooden houses from the 19th century in the local folk architecture.
