= Vyšní Lhoty =

- Municipality
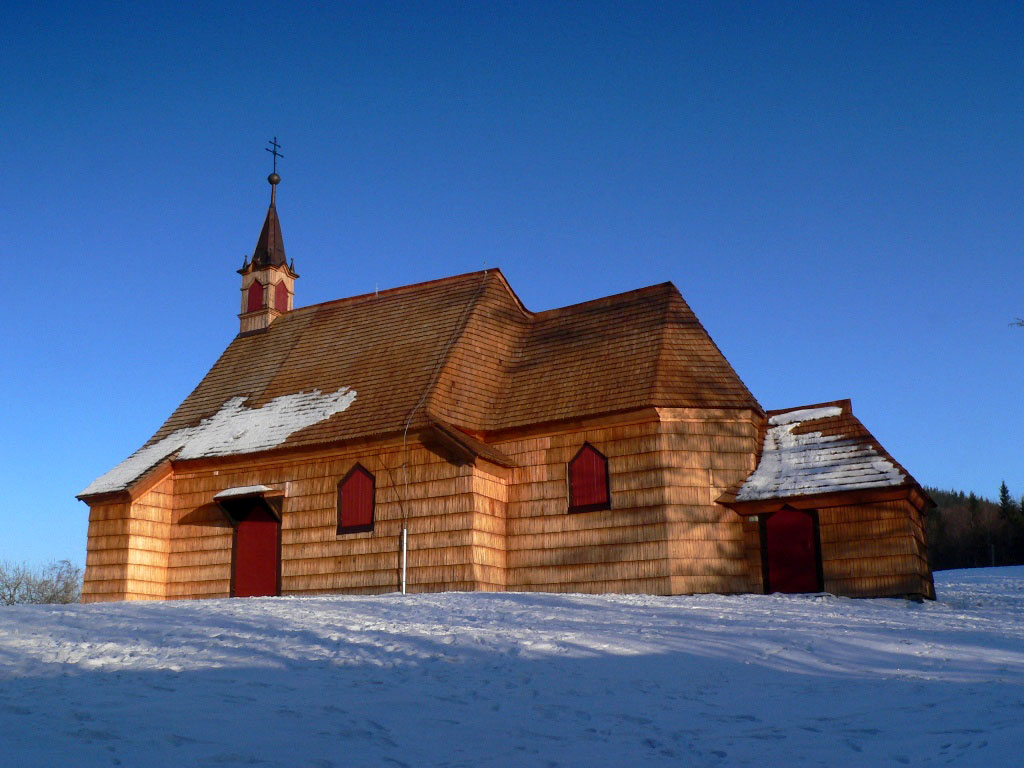
- Church of Saint Anthony of Padua

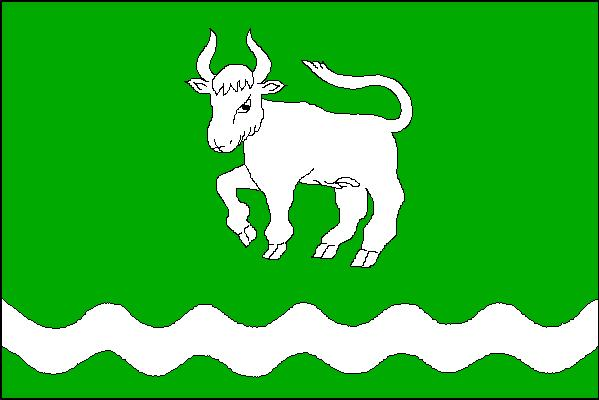
- Flag Coat of arms

- Location in the Czech Republic
- Coordinates: 49°38′9″N 18°27′25″E
- Country: Czech Republic
- Region: Moravian-Silesian
- District: Frýdek-Místek
- First mentioned: 1524

Area
  - Total: 11.47 km^{2} (4.43 sq mi)
- Elevation: 375 m (1,230 ft)

Population (2026-01-01)
  - Total: 903
  - Density: 78.7/km^{2} (204/sq mi)
- Time zone: UTC+1 (CET)
  - Summer (DST): UTC+2 (CEST)
- Postal code: 739 51
- Website: www.vysnilhoty.cz

Vyšní Lhoty (German: Ober Ellgoth, Polish: Ligota Górna) is a municipality and village in Frýdek-Místek District in the Moravian-Silesian Region of the Czech Republic. It has about 900 inhabitants.

== Etymology ==
The name Lhoty is the plural of Lhota, which a very common name of Slavic settlements, derived from lhůta (i.e. 'period'). The adjective Vyšní, originally Hornÿ (i.e. 'upper') was used to differentiate it from the older nearby sister settlement called originally Dolny neb Spodny Lhota, today Nižní Lhoty ('lower Lhoty').

== Geography ==
Vyšní Lhoty is located about 8 kilometres (5 mi) southeast of Frýdek-Místek and 22 km (14 mi) southeast of Ostrava, in the historical region of Cieszyn Silesia. The southeastern half of the municipality lies in the Moravian-Silesian Beskids; the northwestern half lies in the Moravian-Silesian Foothills. The highest point is the mountain Čupel at 872 m (2,861 ft) above sea level. The municipality is situated on the right bank of the Morávka River.

== History ==
The first written mention of a village called Warmnuthowitz, which could be the predecessor of Vyšní Lhoty, is from 1292, when the probable founder of the village Pašek Mudrý Warmund was mentioned. This village itself was then mentioned in a Latin document of Diocese of Wrocław called Liber fundationis episcopatus Vratislaviensis from around 1305, however it is disputed by some historians if it really is today's Vyšní Lhoty. Moudreho Lhota mentioned in 1524 still leaves doubts. (Note: This leaves the question what happened to Warmnuthowitz, as it indeed lay somewhere in the vicinity but is now considered lost. It was probably absorbed by another nearby village, but not necessarily by Vyšní Lhoty. Compare: I. Panic, 2015, p. 298.) The oldest record with the names of settlers is from 1580. Surely it was mentioned in 1584 as Hornÿ Lhota in the document sealing the selling of Friedeck state country by Stanislav II Pavlovský, Bishop of Olomouc, to Bartholomew of Wrbno.

The Friedeck state country was split from the Duchy of Teschen in 1573 when the village must have already existed. It was a part of the Kingdom of Bohemia and the Habsburg monarchy. After World War I, the municipality became a part of Czechoslovakia. In March 1939 it became a part of Protectorate of Bohemia and Moravia. After World War II, it was restored to Czechoslovakia.

== Demographics ==
Historical population

Year	Pop.	±%
1869	1,263	—
1880	1,304	+3.2%
1890	1,216	−6.7%
1900	1,203	−1.1%
1910	1,145	−4.8%

Year	Pop.	±%
1921	1,035	−9.6%
1930	1,055	+1.9%
1950	984	−6.7%
1961	981	−0.3%
1970	906	−7.6%

Year	Pop.	±%
1980	806	−11.0%
1991	686	−14.9%
2001	737	+7.4%
2011	811	+10.0%
2021	841	+3.7%

Source: Censuses

== Transport ==
There are no railways or major roads passing through the municipality.

== Sights ==
The most important monument is the Church of Saint Anthony of Padua, located on the mountain Malá Prašivá. It is a wooden church, built in 1640. The sacristy was added in 1779 and the small tower was added in 1860.
