= Provodovice =

- Municipality
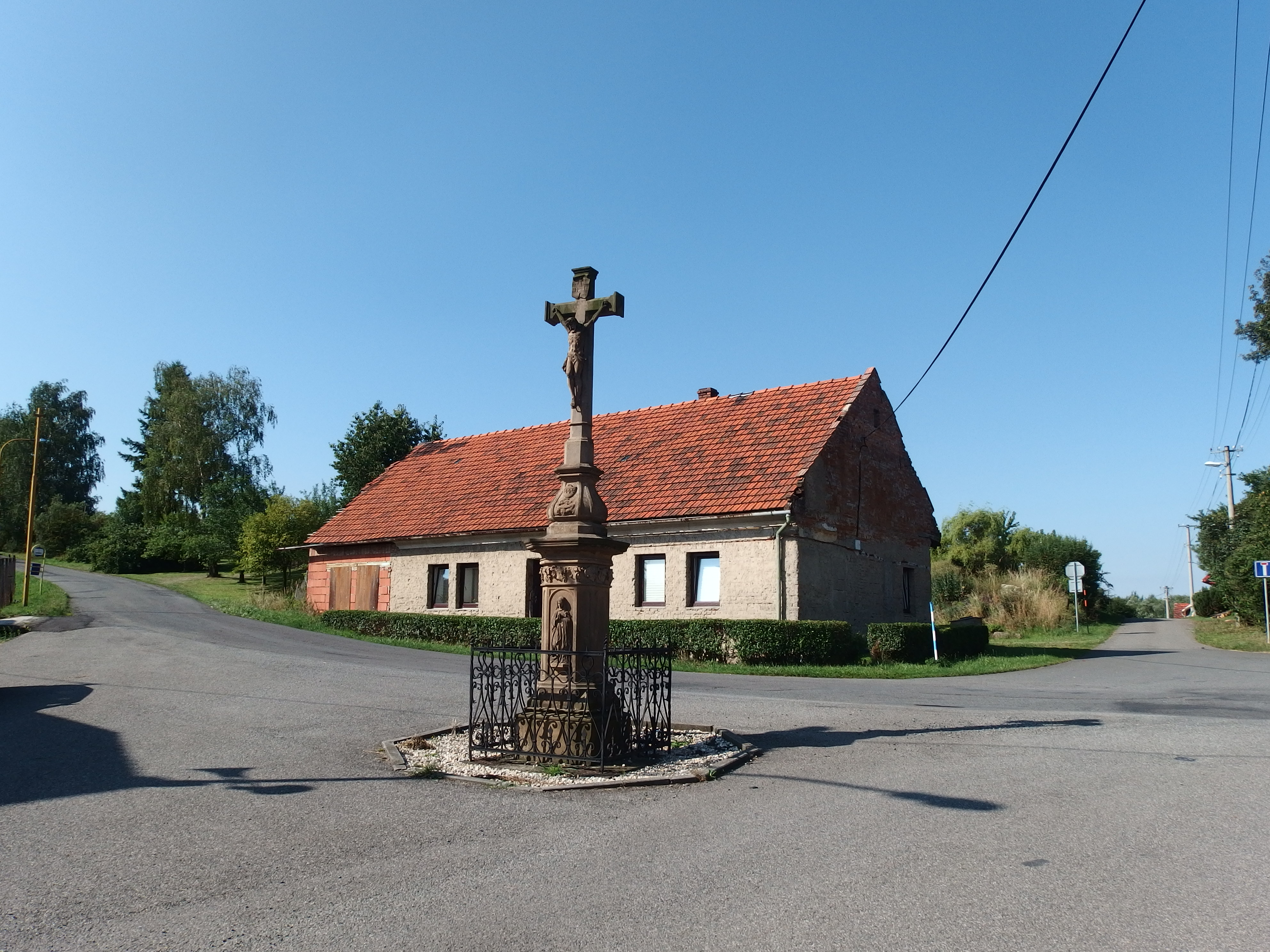
- Cross by the main road

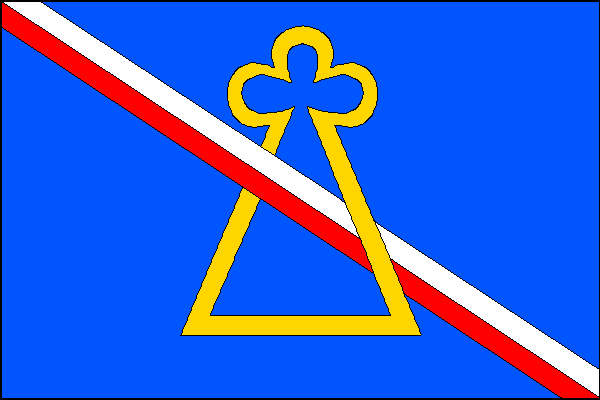
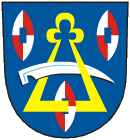
- Flag Coat of arms

- Location in the Czech Republic
- Coordinates: 49°27′3″N 17°46′6″E
- Country: Czech Republic
- Region: Olomouc
- District: Přerov
- First mentioned: 1302

Area
  - Total: 3.28 km^{2} (1.27 sq mi)
- Elevation: 355 m (1,165 ft)

Population (2026-01-01)
  - Total: 165
  - Density: 50.3/km^{2} (130/sq mi)
- Time zone: UTC+1 (CET)
  - Summer (DST): UTC+2 (CEST)
- Postal code: 753 53
- Website: www.provodovice.cz

Provodovice is a municipality and village in Přerov District in the Olomouc Region of the Czech Republic. It has about 200 inhabitants.

== Etymology ==
The name is derived from the personal name Provod, meaning "the village of Provod's people".

== Geography ==
Provodovice is located about 22 km (14 mi) west of Přerov and 39 km (24 mi) southeast of Olomouc. It lies in the Moravian-Silesian Foothills. The highest point is at 392 m (1,286 ft) above sea level. The Juhyně Stream flows along the western and northern municipal border.

== History ==
The first written mention of Provodovice is from 1302.

== Demographics ==
Historical population

Year	Pop.	±%
1869	253	—
1880	314	+24.1%
1890	289	−8.0%
1900	249	−13.8%
1910	235	−5.6%

Year	Pop.	±%
1921	214	−8.9%
1930	233	+8.9%
1950	225	−3.4%
1961	231	+2.7%
1970	217	−6.1%

Year	Pop.	±%
1980	189	−12.9%
1991	148	−21.7%
2001	125	−15.5%
2011	146	+16.8%
2021	150	+2.7%

Source: Censuses

== Transport ==
There are no railways or major roads passing through the municipality.

== Sights ==
There are no protected cultural monuments in the municipality. The only landmarks are two wayside crosses and a statue of Saint John of Nepomuk.
