= Radegast (beer) =

Czech beer

- Founded: 1970; 56 years ago
- Headquarters: Nošovice, Czech Republic
- Parent: Asahi Breweries
- Website: Official site in Czech

Radegast is a Czech beer brewed in Nošovice, Moravian-Silesian Region, Czech Republic since 1970. The beer is named after the Slavic god Radegast. Stemming from the name for the beer is the slogan: "Život je hořký: Bohudík", a Czech phrase which translates into English as "Life is bitter: Thank God" (in reference to the beer's "bitter" taste).

The brewery is owned by Pilsner Urquell (since 1999), which is, in turn, owned by Asahi Breweries. Radegast is the most popular beer in Moravia.

== Products ==
The company brews the following different varieties of beer:

Brew	Description
Radegast Rázná 10	A pale draught beer with 4.1% ABV (in Czech: 10° or Výčepní)
Radegast Ryze hořká 12	A pale bitter lager with 5.1% ABV (in Czech: 12° or Hořký ležák)
Radegast Gloomy Bitter	A semi-dark bitter lager with 5.2% ABV (in Czech: 12° or Temně hořký ležák)
Radegast Unfiltered	An unfiltered, unpasteurized yeast pale lager with 5.1% ABV (in Czech: Nefiltrované)
Radegast Extra Bitter	An extra bitter special edition beer with 6.5% ABV and 42 IBU (in Czech: 15° or Extra hořké)
Radegast Ratar	The bitterest Radegast beer with 4.3% ABV and 50 IBU
Birell (non-alcoholic)	A pale non-alcoholic beer
Birell Polotmavý (non-alcoholic)	A semi-dark non-alcoholic beer
Birell Green Barley (non-alcoholic)	A flavored pale non-alcoholic beer

== Gallery ==
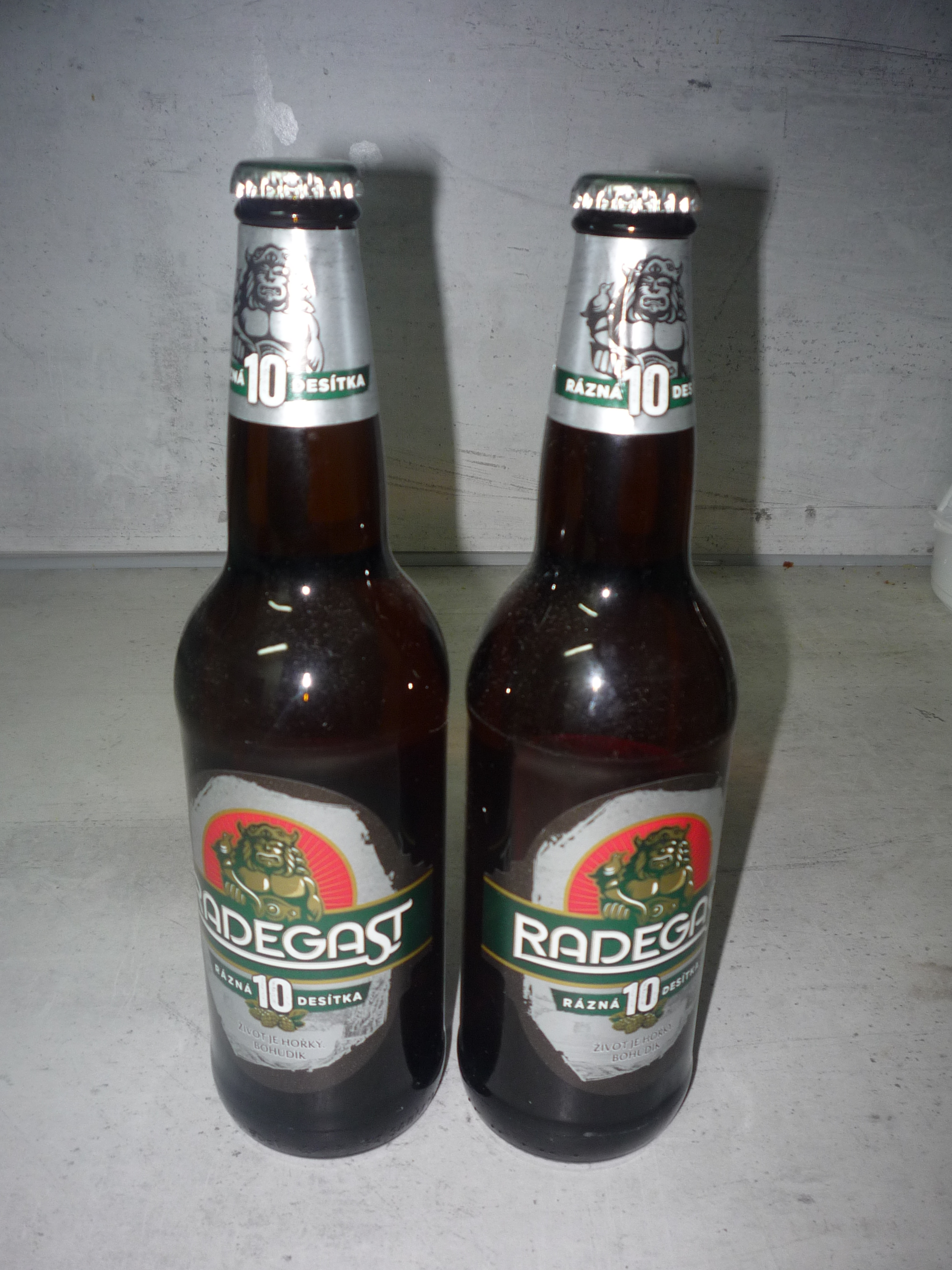
Radegast Rázná 10

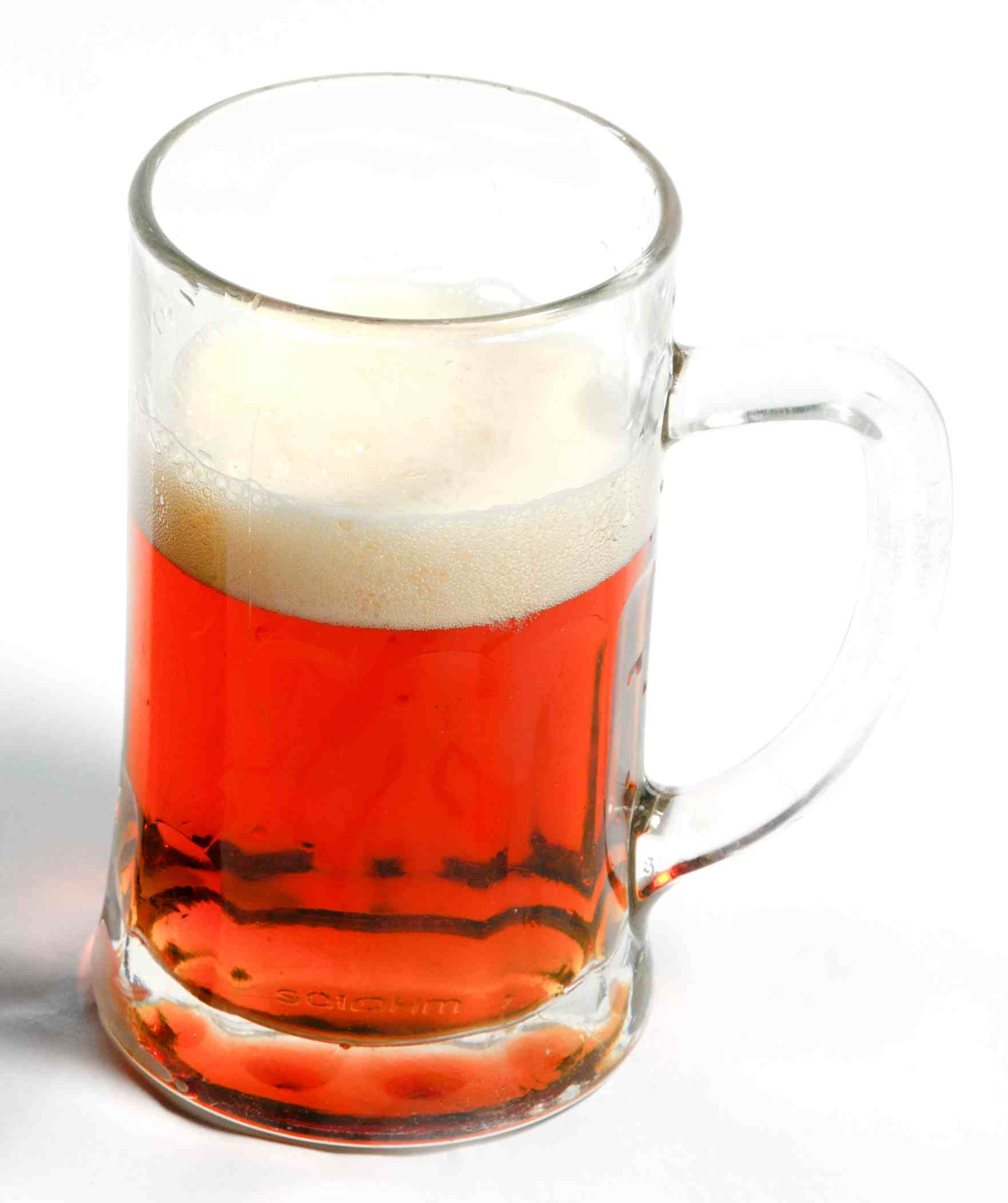
Radegast Temně hořký 12

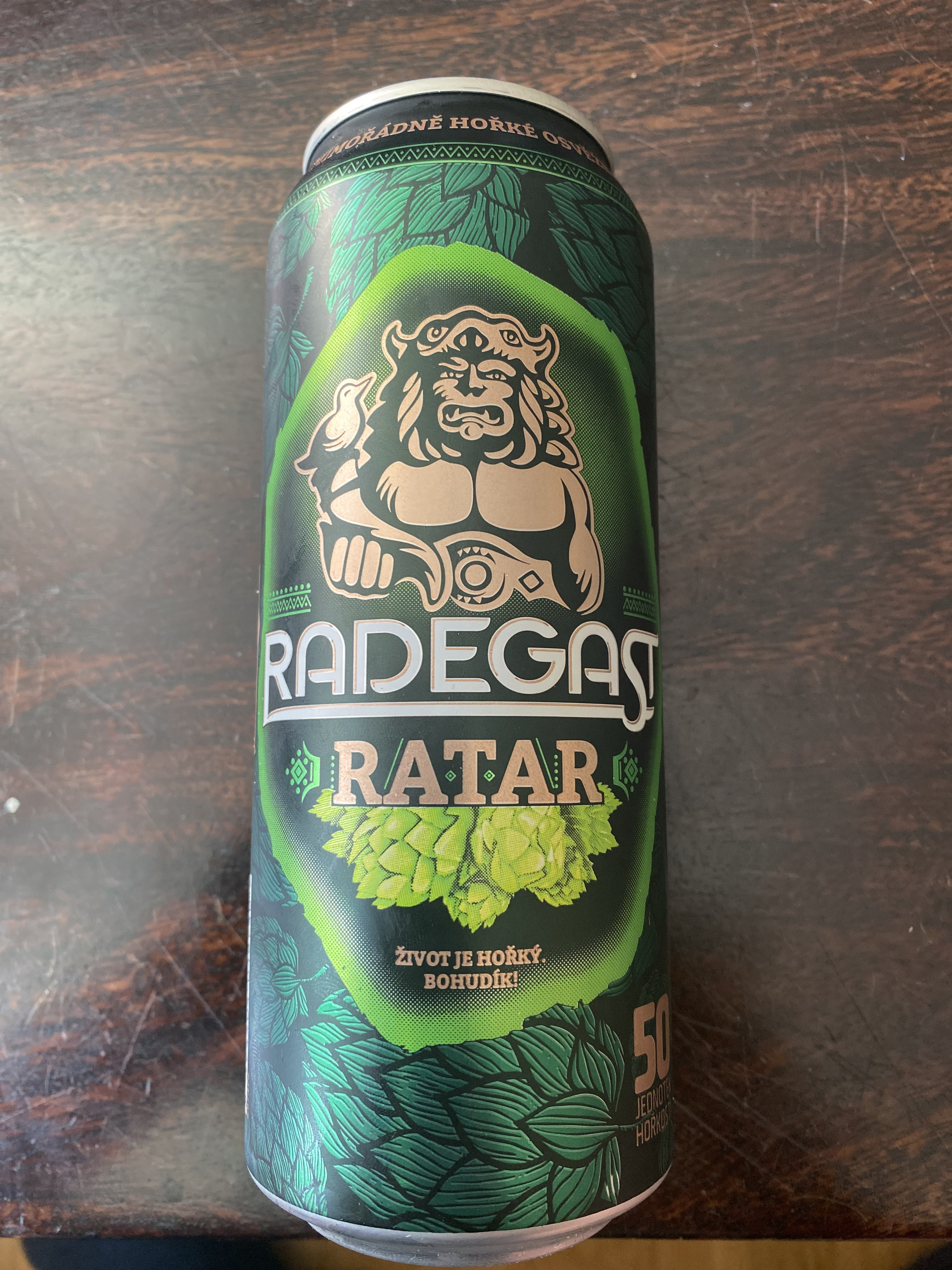
Radegast Ratar

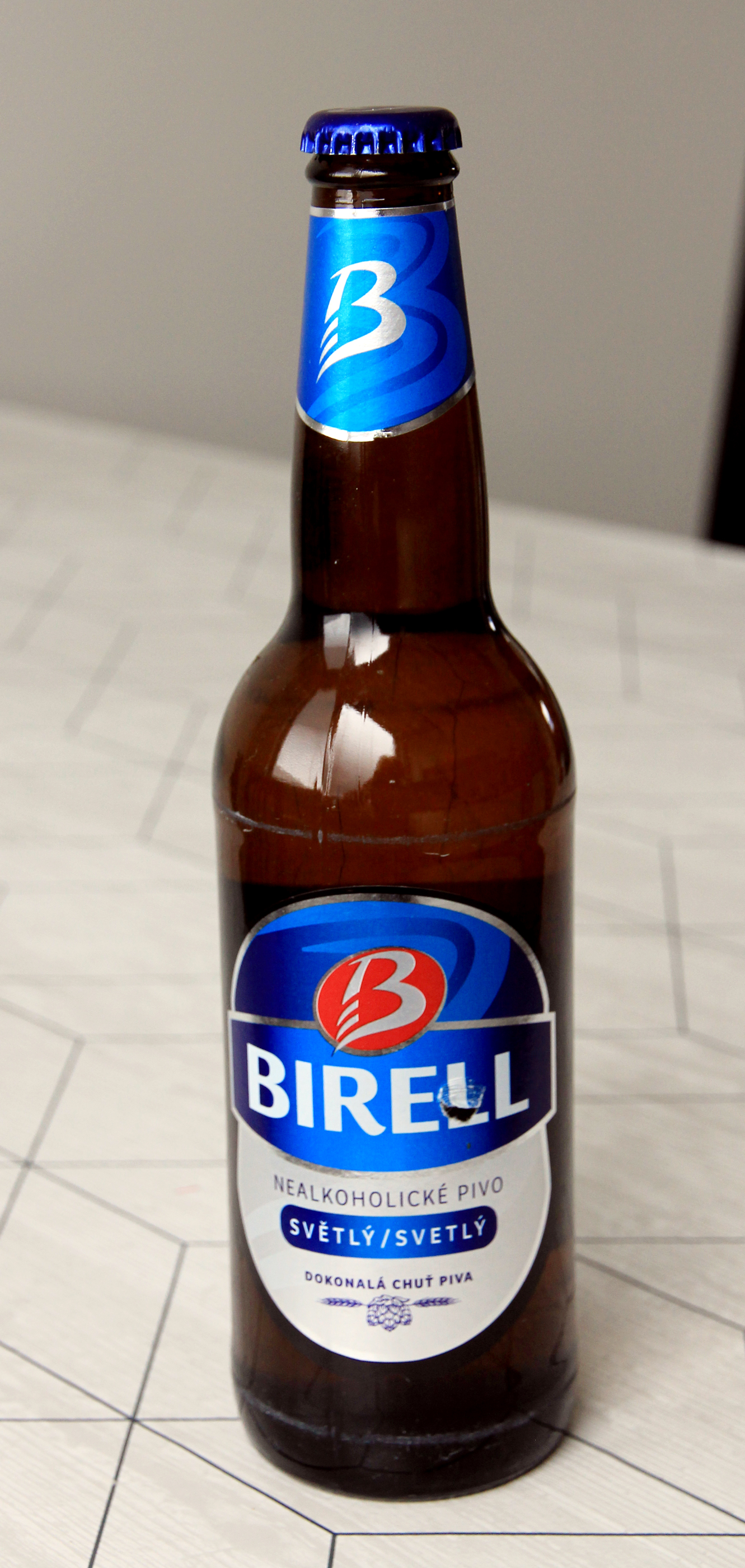
Birell, pale non-alcoholic beer

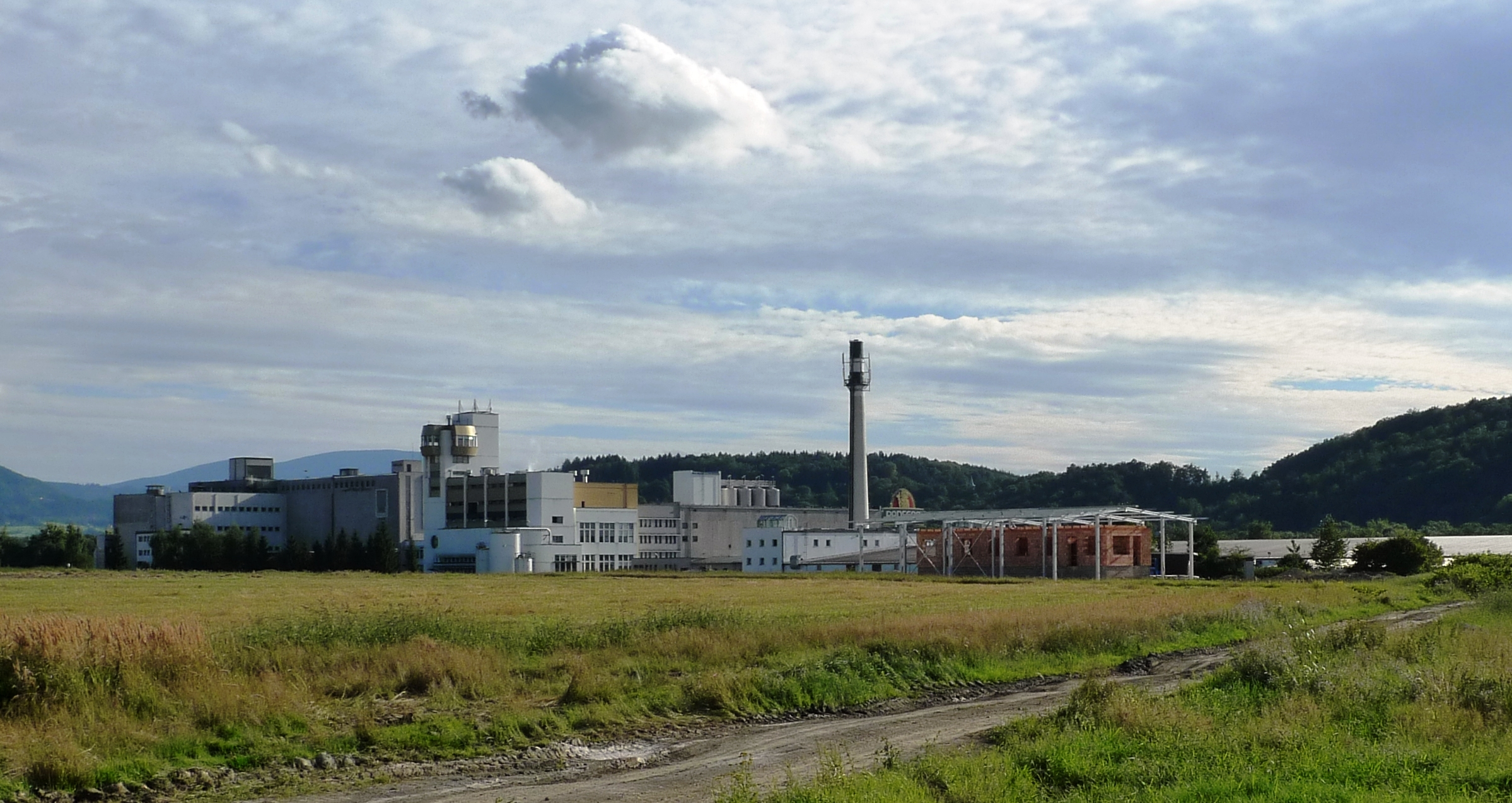
Radegast Brewery in Nošovice

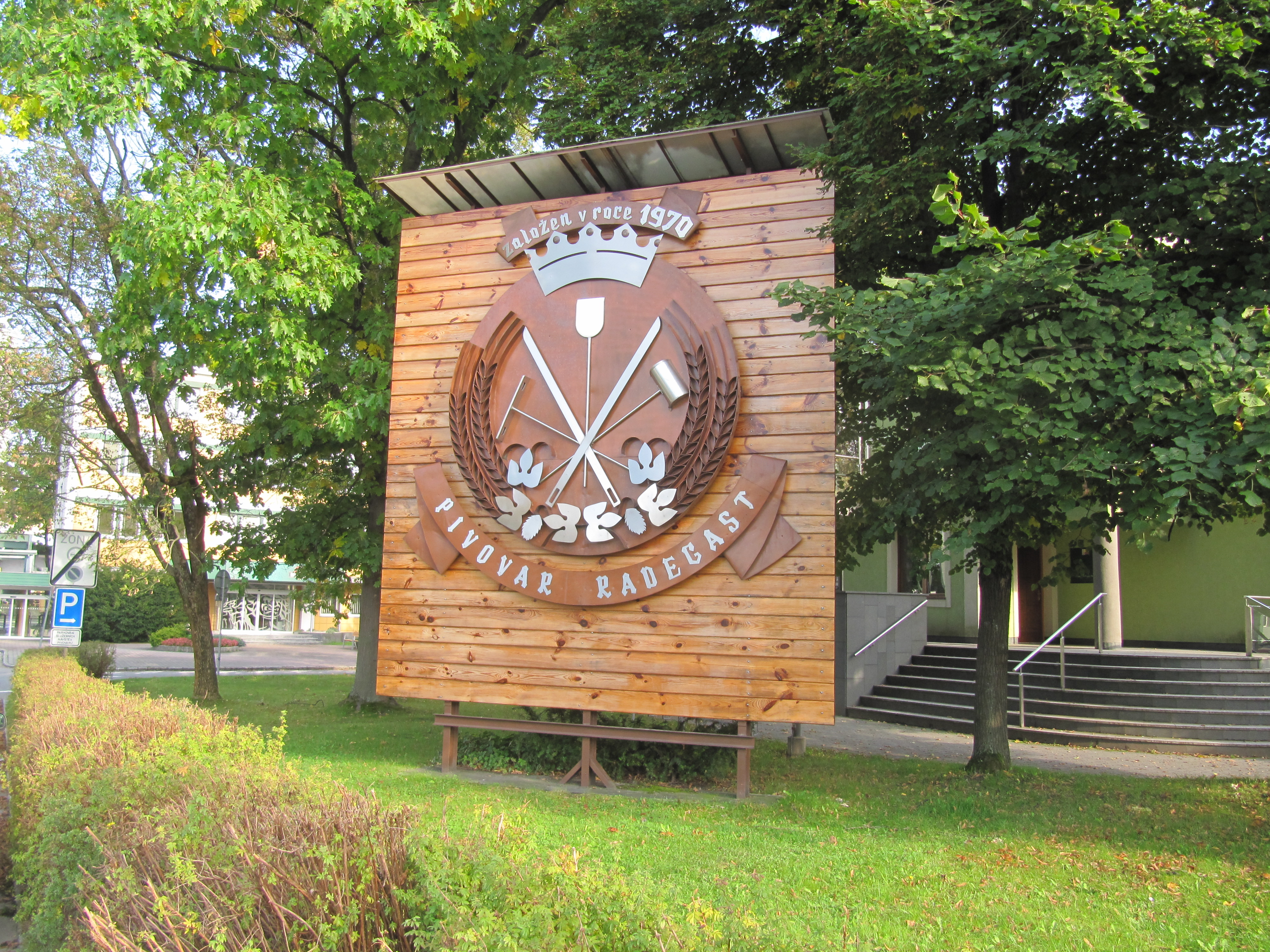
Radegast logo in brewery

== See also ==
- Beer in the Czech Republic
