= Morávka Reservoir =

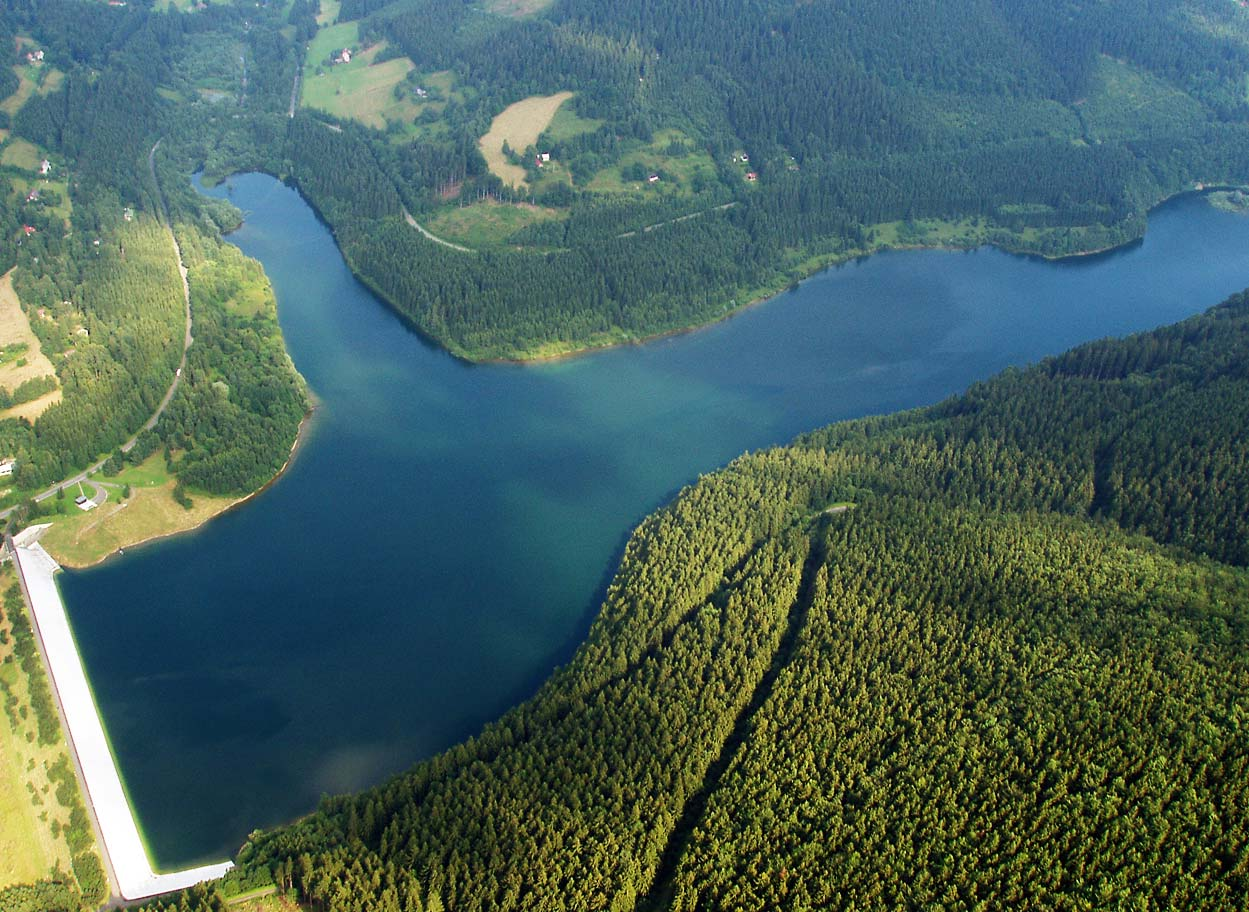
- Aerial view

- Location within Czech Republic
- Coordinates: 49°34′50″N 18°32′15″E
- Type: reservoir
- Primary inflows: Morávka
- Primary outflows: Morávka
- Catchment area: 63.3 km^{2} (24.4 sq mi)
- Basin countries: Czech Republic
- Surface area: 79.5 ha (196 acres)
- Water volume: 500,000 m^{3} (410 acre⋅ft)
- Surface elevation: 518 m (1,699 ft)

Morávka Reservoir (Czech: vodní nádrž Morávka) is a water reservoir and dam in Morávka in the Moravian-Silesian Region of the Czech Republic. The reservoir is built on the Morávka River and has a surface of 79.5 ha (196 acres). It was constructed in 1961–1967.

The main purpose of the reservoir is to supply drinking water to nearby towns and to subdue floods on the Morávka and Ostravice rivers. It is one of the highest quality sources of drinking water in the entire Moravian-Silesian Region. For these reasons, recreational activities are prohibited on the reservoir, and fish farming is only carried out on a limited scale so as not to endanger the water quality.
