= Morávka meteorite =

2000 meteorite in the Czech Republic

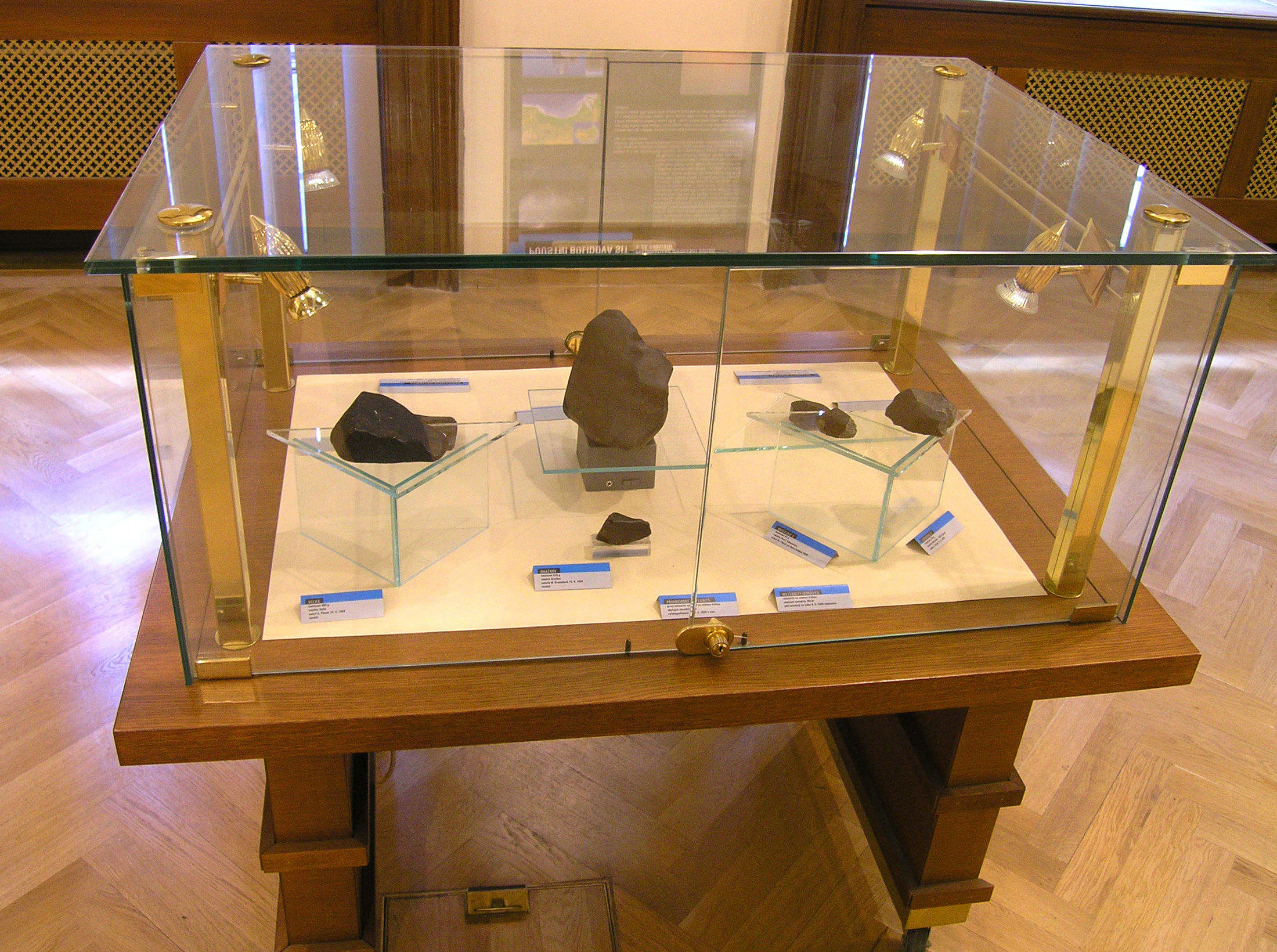
- Pieces of Příbram and Morávka meteorites
- Type: Chondrite
- Class: Ordinary chondrite
- Group: H5–6
- Country: Czech Republic
- Coordinates: 49.6°N 18.53333°E
- Observed fall: Yes
- Fall date: 6 May 2000, 11:51:52 UTC
- TKW: 1.4 kilograms (3.1 lb)

The Morávka meteorite is a meteorite which fell on 6 May 2000 near Morávka in northern Moravia, Czech Republic. Six pieces were recovered, with a total mass of 1.4 kg and characterized as H5–6 ordinary chondrites.

== Observation ==
The fireball, with a visual magnitude of −20, was observed during daytime by thousands of people in the Czech Republic, Poland, and Slovakia and videotaped by 3 witnesses. A sonic boom was heard in northern Moravia and recorded by 16 seismic stations.

== Orbit ==
Based on the observations, Morávka became only the sixth meteorite whose pre-impact orbit was calculated: its semimajor axis was 1.85 AU, the perihelion distance was 0.982 AU, and the inclination was 32.2 degrees.

== See also ==
- Příbram meteorite – 1959 meteorite in Czechoslovakia
