= Nižní Lhoty =

- Municipality
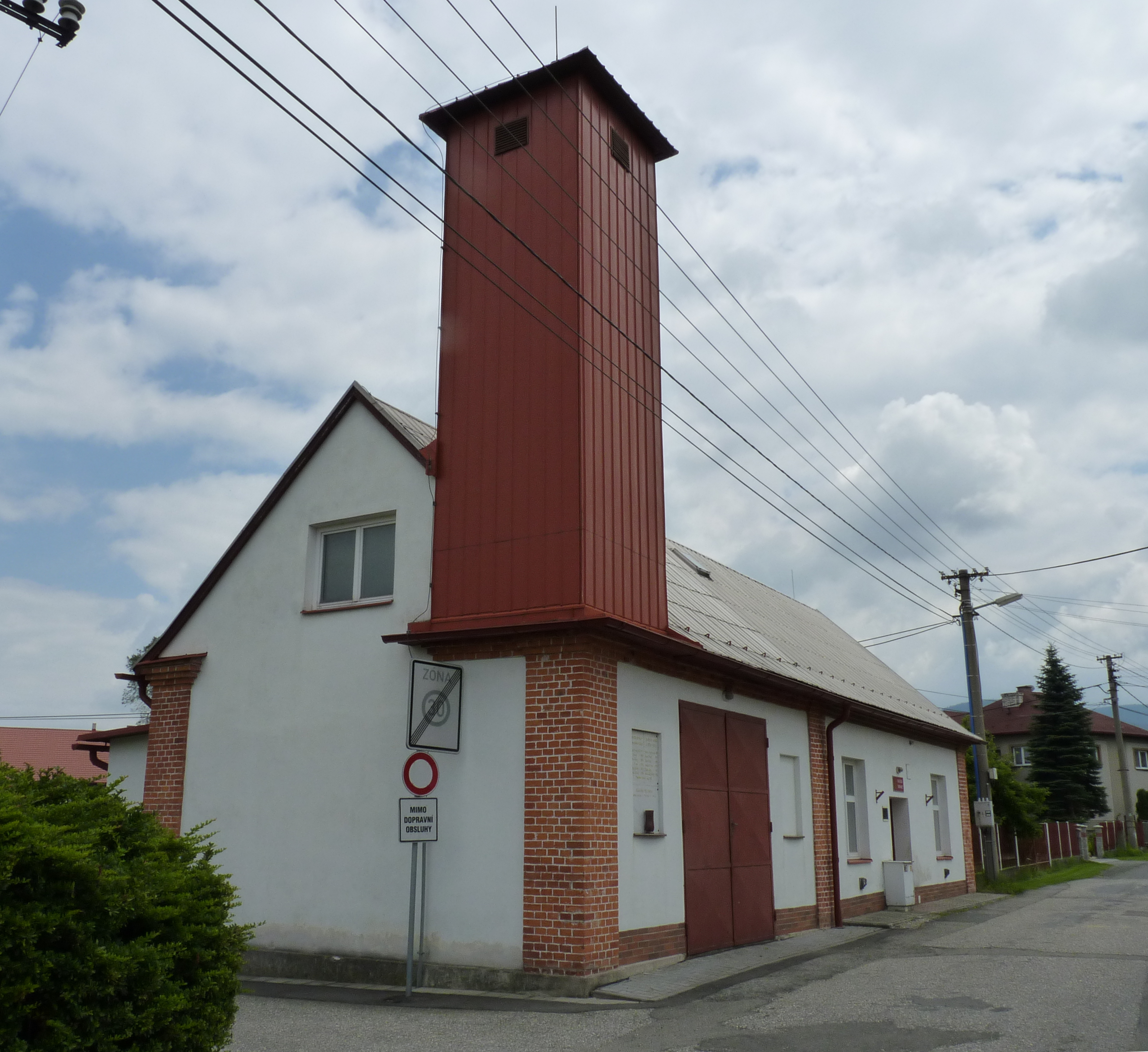
- Fire station

- Flag Coat of arms

- Location in the Czech Republic
- Coordinates: 49°38′46″N 18°26′12″E
- Country: Czech Republic
- Region: Moravian-Silesian
- District: Frýdek-Místek
- First mentioned: 1434

Area
  - Total: 3.79 km^{2} (1.46 sq mi)
- Elevation: 359 m (1,178 ft)

Population (2026-01-01)
  - Total: 296
  - Density: 78.1/km^{2} (202/sq mi)
- Time zone: UTC+1 (CET)
  - Summer (DST): UTC+2 (CEST)
- Postal code: 739 51
- Website: www.niznilhoty.cz

Nižní Lhoty (Polish: Ligota Dolna, German: Unter Ellgoth) is a municipality and village in Frýdek-Místek District in the Moravian-Silesian Region of the Czech Republic. It has about 300 inhabitants.

== Etymology ==
The name Lhoty is the plural of Lhota, which a very common name of Slavic settlements, derived from lhůta (i.e. 'period'). The adjective Nižní, originally Dolny neb Spodny (i.e. 'lower') was used to differentiate it from the younger nearby sister settlement called originally Hornÿ, today Vyšní Lhoty ('upper Lhoty').

== Geography ==
Nižní Lhoty is located about 6 kilometres (4 mi) southeast of Frýdek-Místek and 20 km (12 mi) southeast of Ostrava. It lies in the historical region of Cieszyn Silesia, in the western part of the Moravian-Silesian Foothills. The municipality is situated on the right bank of the Morávka River.

== History ==
Some sources state that the village was first mentioned in a Latin document of Diocese of Wrocław called Liber fundationis episcopatus Vratislaviensis from around 1305 as item Rudgeri villa, however it is very unlikely and disputed. (Note: This leaves the question what happened to Rudgeri villa, as it indeed lay somewhere in the vicinity but is now considered lost. It was probably absorbed by another nearby village, but not necessarily by Nižní Lhoty.) Far more likely it was later mentioned in 1434 as Lhoty and in 1450 as Rozkowa Lhota. Later up the Morávka river the sister settlement of Vyšní Lhoty was established. They were then both mentioned in 1584. The name Nižní Lhoty was first used in 1573.

Politically the village belonged initially to the Duchy of Teschen. In 1573 it was sold as one of 16 villages and the town of Friedeck and formed a state country split from the Duchy of Teschen.

The village had a typical agricultural and pastoral character. In the 18th century, the road leading through the valley to the mountain area led outside the built-up part of the village, which led to the isolation of the village and only a very slow development of business and trade.

After World War I and fall of Austria-Hungary, it became a part of Czechoslovakia. In March 1939, it became a part of Protectorate of Bohemia and Moravia. After World War II, it was restored to Czechoslovakia.

== Demographics ==
Historical population

Year	Pop.	±%
1869	449	—
1880	436	−2.9%
1890	413	−5.3%
1900	420	+1.7%
1910	405	−3.6%

Year	Pop.	±%
1921	410	+1.2%
1930	457	+11.5%
1950	390	−14.7%
1961	363	−6.9%
1970	334	−8.0%

Year	Pop.	±%
1980	269	−19.5%
1991	246	−8.6%
2001	249	+1.2%
2011	255	+2.4%
2021	290	+13.7%

Source: Censuses

== Transport ==
There are no railways or major roads passing through the municipality.

== Sights ==
There are no protected cultural monuments in the municipality.
