= Raškovice =

- Municipality
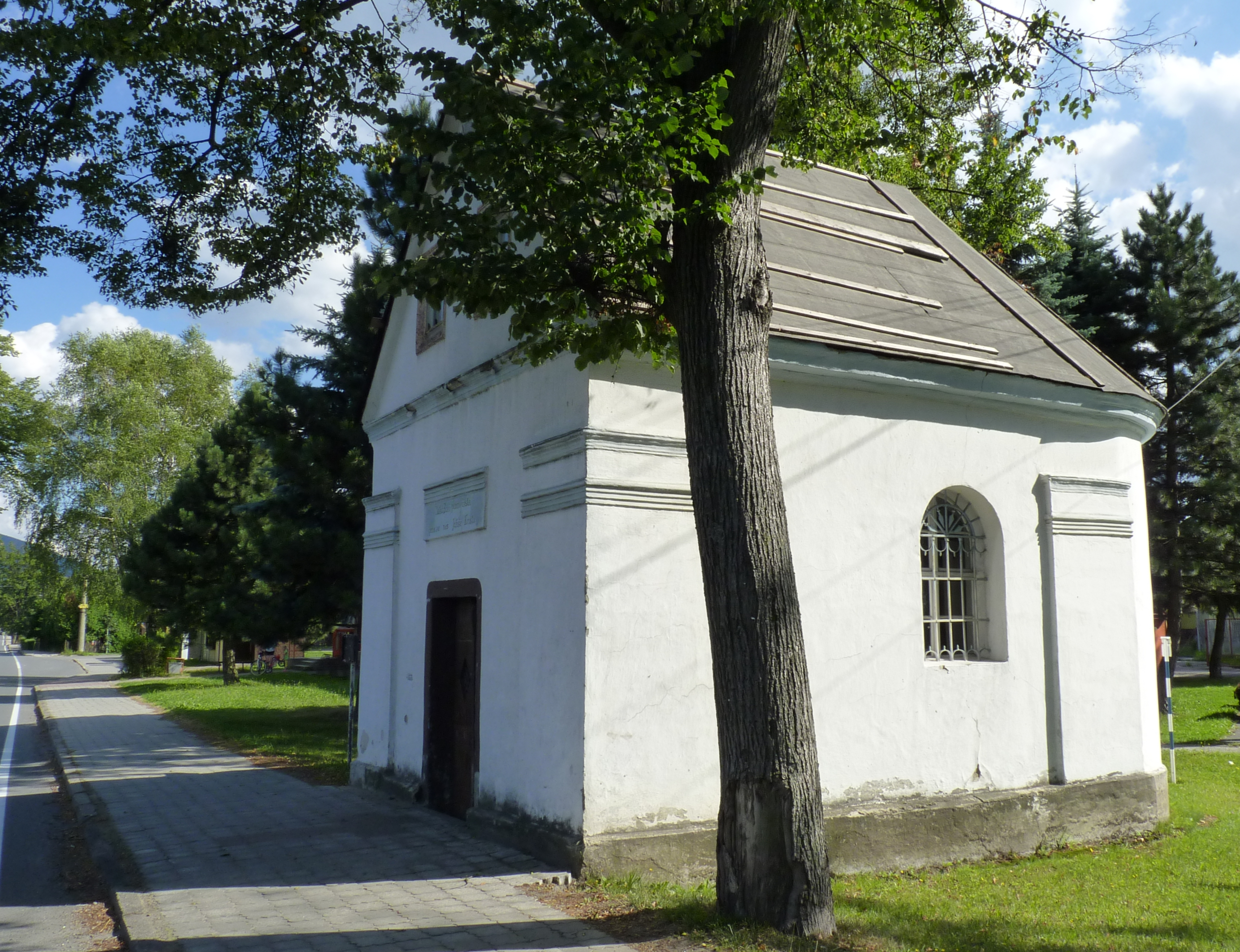
- Chapel of the Virgin Mary

- Flag Coat of arms

- Location in the Czech Republic
- Coordinates: 49°37′11″N 18°28′22″E
- Country: Czech Republic
- Region: Moravian-Silesian
- District: Frýdek-Místek
- First mentioned: 1305

Area
  - Total: 8.63 km^{2} (3.33 sq mi)
- Elevation: 395 m (1,296 ft)

Population (2026-01-01)
  - Total: 2,043
  - Density: 237/km^{2} (613/sq mi)
- Time zone: UTC+1 (CET)
  - Summer (DST): UTC+2 (CEST)
- Postal code: 739 04
- Website: www.raskovice.cz

Raškovice (Polish: Raszkowice) is a municipality and village in Frýdek-Místek District in the Moravian-Silesian Region of the Czech Republic. It has about 2,000 inhabitants.

== Etymology ==
The name was probably derived from the personal name Raška.

== Geography ==
Raškovice is located about 11 kilometres (7 mi) southeast of Frýdek-Místek and 25 km (16 mi) southeast of Ostrava, in the historical region of Cieszyn Silesia. It lies in the Moravian-Silesian Foothills. The highest point is at 525 m (1,722 ft) above sea level. The municipality is situated on the left bank of the Morávka River.

== History ==
The first written mention of Raškovice is from 1305 under the names Holzmul and Rudgeri villa. The village under its current name was first mentioned in 1573. It was part of the Frýdek estate.

== Demographics ==
Historical population

Year	Pop.	±%
1869	1,135	—
1880	1,304	+14.9%
1890	1,246	−4.4%
1900	1,184	−5.0%
1910	1,206	+1.9%

Year	Pop.	±%
1921	1,284	+6.5%
1930	1,494	+16.4%
1950	1,496	+0.1%
1961	1,547	+3.4%
1970	1,725	+11.5%

Year	Pop.	±%
1980	1,767	+2.4%
1991	1,785	+1.0%
2001	1,738	−2.6%
2011	1,739	+0.1%
2021	1,987	+14.3%

Source: Censuses

== Transport ==
There are no railways or major roads passing through the municipality.

== Sights ==
There are no protected cultural monuments in the municipality.
