= Svatý Jan =

- Municipality
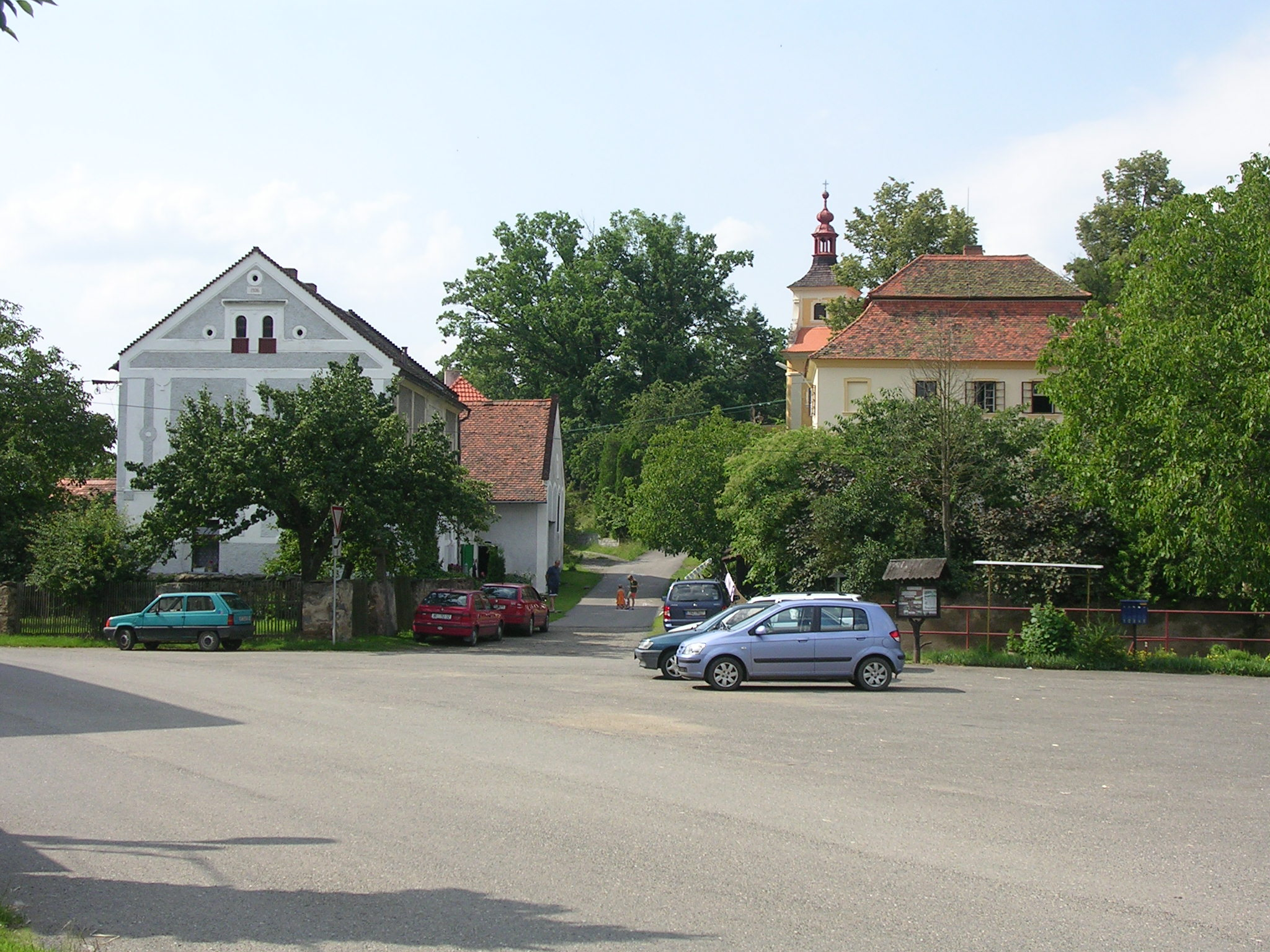
- Centre of Svatý Jan

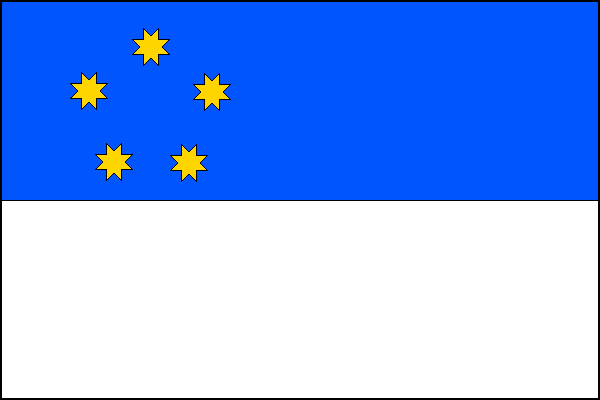
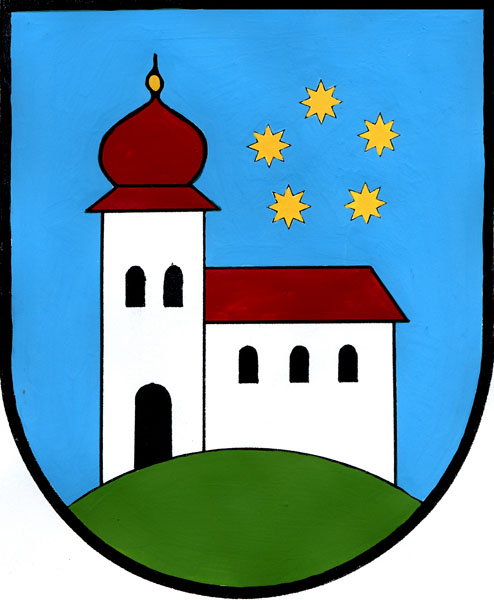
- Flag Coat of arms

- Location in the Czech Republic
- Coordinates: 49°38′13″N 14°18′40″E
- Country: Czech Republic
- Region: Central Bohemian
- District: Příbram
- First mentioned: 1720

Area
  - Total: 21.63 km^{2} (8.35 sq mi)
- Elevation: 409 m (1,342 ft)

Population (2026-01-01)
  - Total: 636
  - Density: 29.4/km^{2} (76.2/sq mi)
- Time zone: UTC+1 (CET)
  - Summer (DST): UTC+2 (CEST)
- Postal codes: 262 56, 262 63
- Website: www.svatyjan-obec.cz

Svatý Jan is a municipality and village in Příbram District in the Central Bohemian Region of the Czech Republic. It has about 600 inhabitants.

== Administrative division ==
Svatý Jan consists of eight municipal parts (in brackets population according to the 2021 census):

- Svatý Jan (84)
- Bražná (46)
- Brzina (14)
- Drážkov (112)
- Hojšín (64)
- Hrachov (248)
- Řadovy (36)
- Skrýšov (78)

== Etymology ==
The name Svatý Jan means 'Saint John' in Czech.

== Geography ==
Svatý Jan is located about 23 kilometres (14 mi) east of Příbram and 45 km (28 mi) south of Prague. It lies in the Benešov Uplands. The highest point is the hill Černá skála at 508 m (1,667 ft) above sea level. The Vltava River forms the northern municipal border. The Brzina Stream flows through the municipality into the Vltava.

== History ==
Svatý Jan is among the youngest villages in the region. There was a spring of water in what is today the village's area, which people considered to be healing, and a chapel was built near it in 1705. The first written mention of Svatý Jan is from 1720.

== Demographics ==
Historical population

Year	Pop.	±%
1869	1,450	—
1880	1,441	−0.6%
1890	1,480	+2.7%
1900	1,457	−1.6%
1910	1,346	−7.6%

Year	Pop.	±%
1921	1,271	−5.6%
1930	1,199	−5.7%
1950	888	−25.9%
1961	801	−9.8%
1970	732	−8.6%

Year	Pop.	±%
1980	630	−13.9%
1991	656	+4.1%
2001	662	+0.9%
2011	652	−1.5%
2021	682	+4.6%

Source: Censuses

== Transport ==
The I/18 road (the section from Příbram to Sedlčany) runs through the northern part of the municipality.

== Sights ==
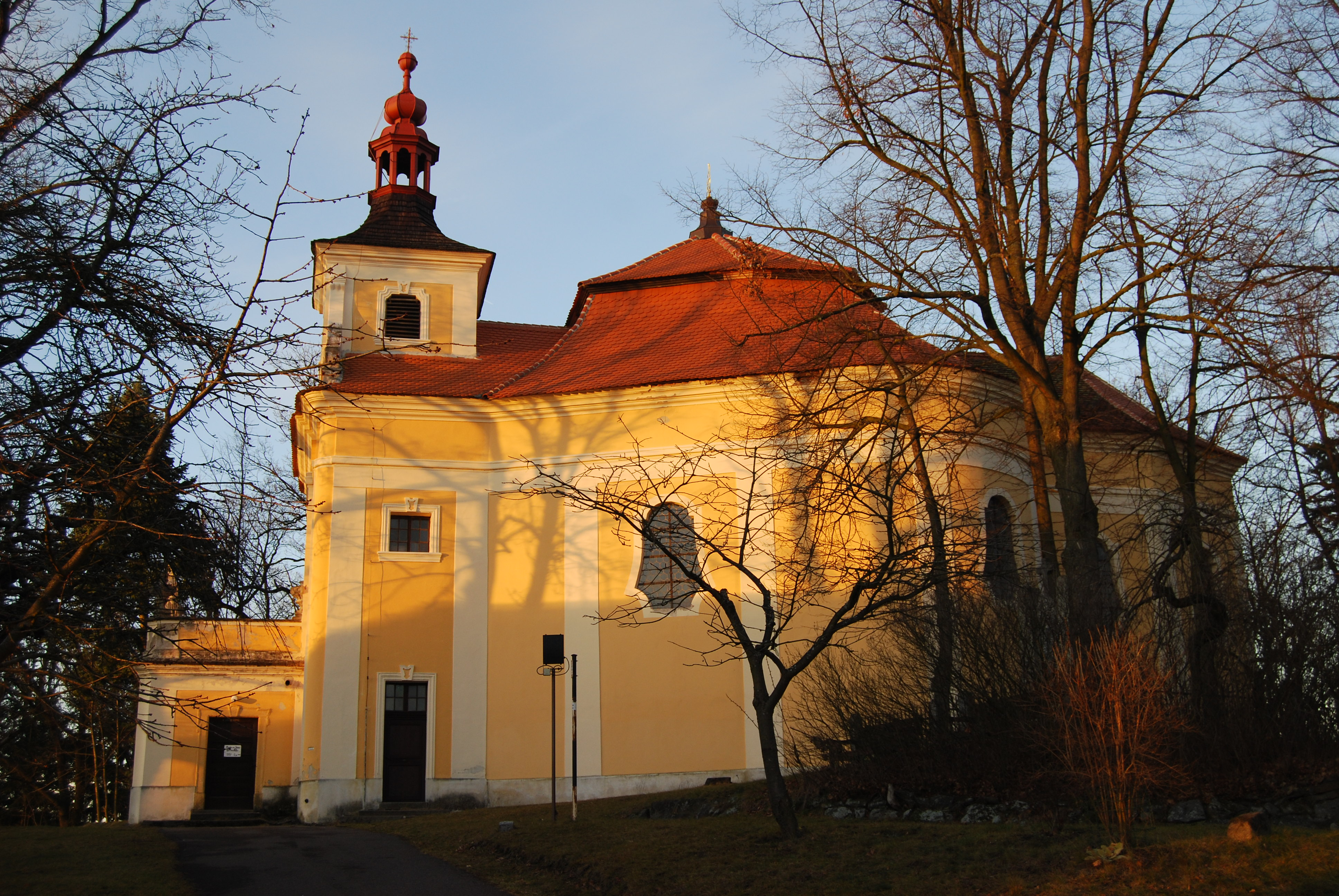
Church of Saint John of Nepomuk

The main landmark of Svatý Jan is the Church of Saint John of Nepomuk. It was built in the Baroque style in 1760–1764.

A historical landmark of Skrýšov is the Skrýšov Castle. It was originally a Renaissance fortress, rebuilt into a small Baroque castle around 1760. Today it is privately owned and inaccessible.

There is a valuable Jewish cemetery in the forests near Řadovy. Most of the Baroque and Neoclassical tombstones date from the 18th and early 19th centuries. The oldest legible tombstone is from 1681.
