= Stonávka =

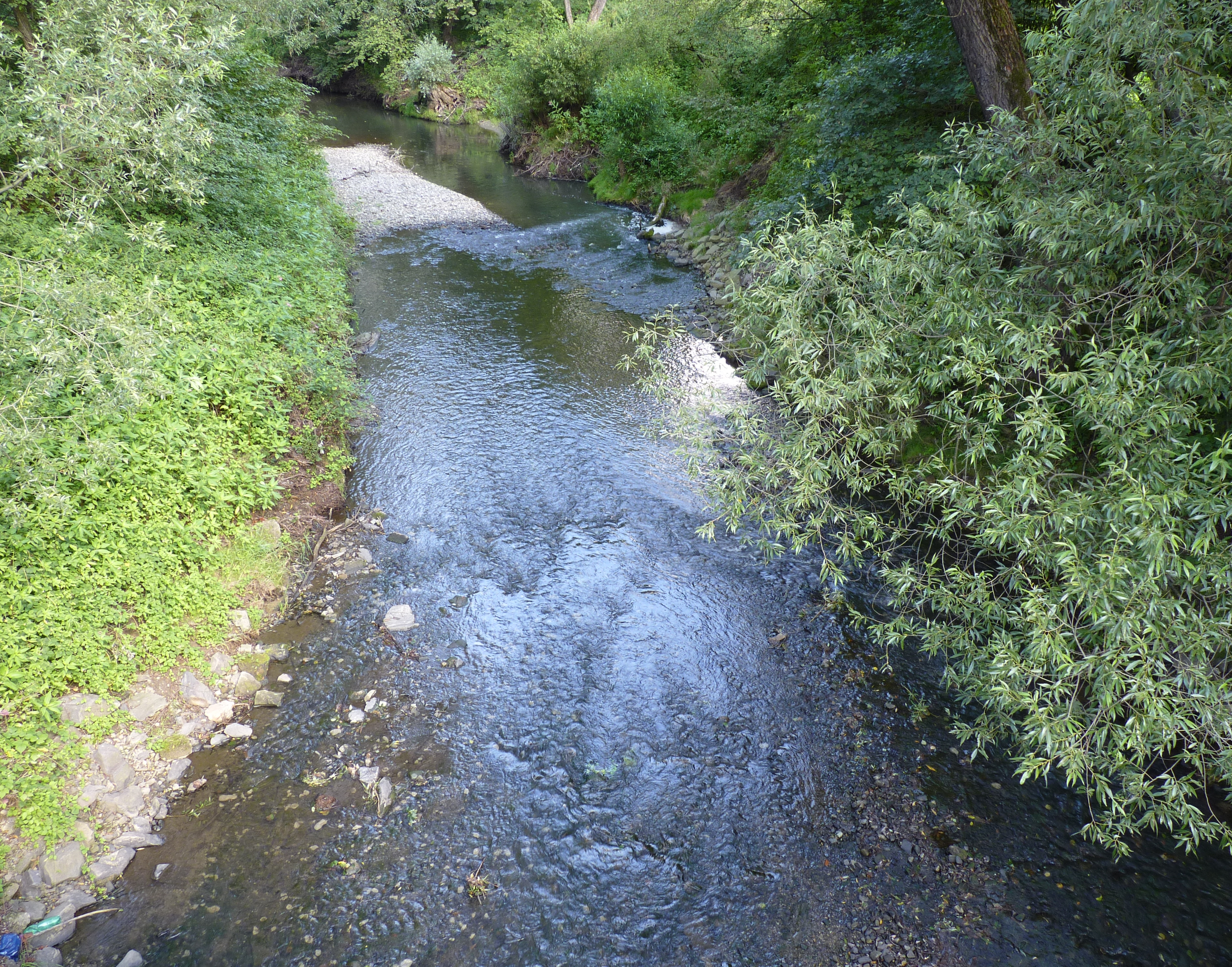
- The Stonávka in Stonava

Location
- Country: Czech Republic
- Region: Moravian-Silesian

Physical characteristics
- Source
  - location: Komorní Lhotka, Moravian-Silesian Beskids
  - coordinates: 49°37′33″N 18°31′3″E
  - elevation: 691 m (2,267 ft)
- Mouth
  - location: Olza
  - coordinates: 49°51′3″N 18°30′45″E
  - elevation: 220 m (720 ft)
- Length: 33.7 km (20.9 mi)
- Basin size: 131.3 km^{2} (50.7 sq mi)
- Discharge
  - average: 1.47 m^{3}/s (52 cu ft/s) near estuary

Basin features
- Progression: Olza→ Oder→ Baltic Sea

The Stonávka (Polish: Stonawka) is a river in the Czech Republic, a left tributary of the Olza. It flows through the Moravian-Silesian Region. It is 33.7 km (20.9 mi) long.

== Etymology ==
The name is derived from the Czech word sténat ('to groan'), meaning 'murmuring river'.

== Characteristic ==
The Stonávka originates in the territory of Komorní Lhotka in the Moravian-Silesian Beskids at an elevation of 691 m (2,267 ft) and flows to Karviná, where it merges with the Olza River at an elevation of 220 m (720 ft). It is 33.7 km (20.9 mi) long. Its drainage basin has an area of 131.3 km^{2} (50.7 sq mi). The average discharge at its mouth is 1.47 m3/s.

The longest tributaries of the Stonávka are:

Tributary	Length (km)	Side
Chotěbuzka	9.5	right
Černý potok	7.6	right
Mušalec	6.0	left
Ráztoka	5.5	right

== Course ==
The river flows through the municipal territories of Komorní Lhotka, Hnojník, Třanovice, Těrlicko, Albrechtice, Stonava and Karviná.

== Bodies of water ==
The Těrlicko Reservoir is built on the river.

== Fauna ==
Protected fish that live in the river include the common minnow. The middle and lower course of the river are home to the Eurasian otter and common kingfisher. The occurrence of the Eurasian beaver was also recorded.

== See also ==
- List of rivers of the Czech Republic
