= Těrlicko Reservoir =

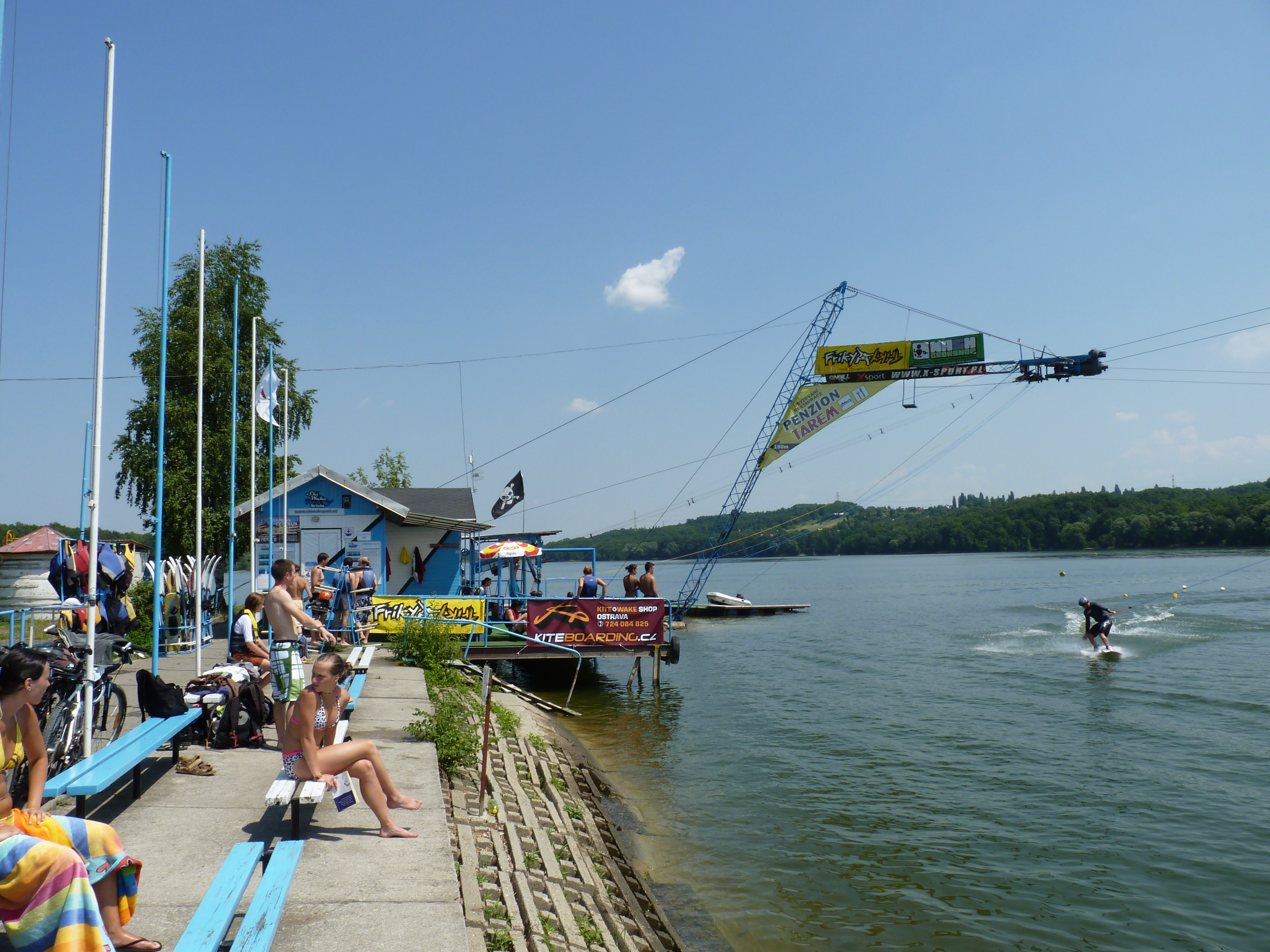

- Location within Czech Republic
- Coordinates: 49°45′17″N 18°29′46″E
- Type: reservoir
- Primary inflows: Stonávka
- Primary outflows: Stonávka
- Basin countries: Czech Republic
- Surface area: 2.68 km^{2} (1.03 sq mi)

Těrlicko Reservoir (Czech: vodní nádrž Těrlicko) is a water reservoir and dam in Těrlicko in the Moravian-Silesian Region of the Czech Republic. It was built on the Stonávka River in 1955–1964 on an area of 2.68 km^{2} (1.03 sq mi).

Construction of the dam had major impact on the municipality of Těrlicko. 141 buildings were sunk, including many community buildings and also a church. Těrlicko was eventually transformed into a village with many tourist attractions. Many recreational centres were built. The reservoir is a popular spot for water sports, and is also used to supply water for nearby coal mines and Třinec Iron and Steel Works.
