= Morávka (river) =

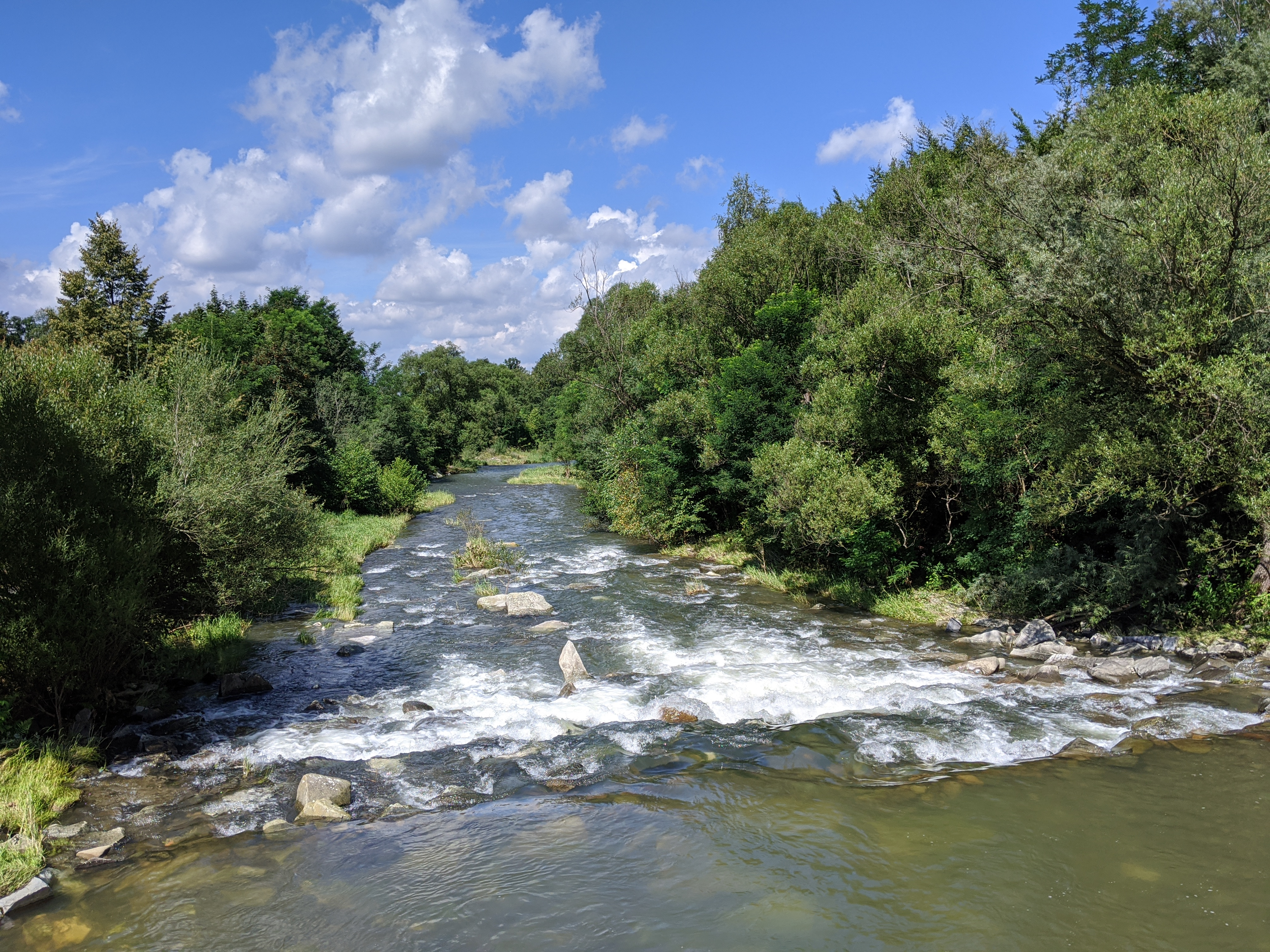
- The Morávka in Raškovice

Location
- Country: Czech Republic
- Region: Moravian-Silesian

Physical characteristics
- Source
  - location: Morávka, Moravian-Silesian Beskids
  - coordinates: 49°30′8″N 18°32′34″E
  - elevation: 861 m (2,825 ft)
- Mouth
  - location: Ostravice
  - coordinates: 49°40′19″N 18°21′25″E
  - elevation: 288 m (945 ft)
- Length: 29.6 km (18.4 mi)
- Basin size: 149.3 km^{2} (57.6 sq mi)
- Discharge
  - average: 3.73 m^{3}/s (132 cu ft/s) near estuary

Basin features
- Progression: Ostravice→ Oder→ Baltic Sea

The Morávka (Polish: Morawka) is a river in the Czech Republic, a right tributary of the Ostravice. It flows through the Moravian-Silesian Region. It is 29.6 km (18.4 mi) long.

== Etymology ==
The name is a diminutive form of Morava.

== Characteristic ==
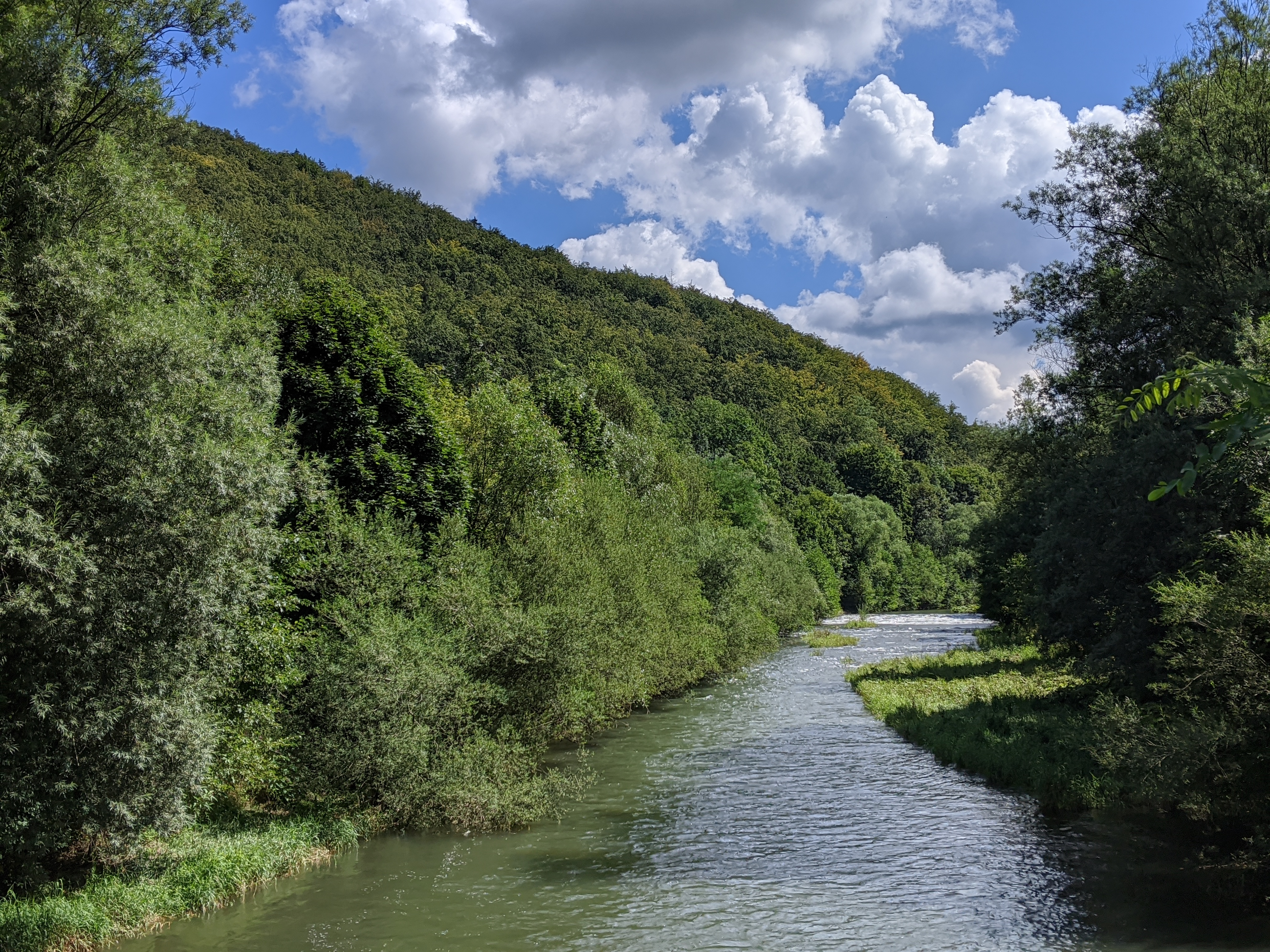
The Morávka next to the Kršle Nature Reserve

The Morávka originates in the territory of Morávka in the Moravian-Silesian Beskids at an elevation of 861 m (2,825 ft) and flows to Staré Město, where it merges with the Ostravice River at an elevation of 288 m (945 ft). It is 29.6 km (18.4 mi) long. Its drainage basin has an area of 149.3 km^{2} (57.6 sq mi).

The longest tributaries of the Morávka are:

Tributary	Length (km)	Side
Mohelnice	12.8	left
Skalka	7.9	right
Slavíč	7.9	right

== Course ==
The river flows through the municipal territories of Morávka, Pražmo, Vyšní Lhoty, Raškovice, Nižní Lhoty, Frýdek-Místek (Skalice exclave), Nošovice, Dobrá and Staré Město.

In Vyšní Lhoty, part of the river divides and flows through the Morávka–Žermanice canal (also called Vyšní Lhoty–Žermanice canal), which connects the Morávka with the Lučina River. The canal was built in 1953–1958 and has a length of 7.5 km (4.7 mi). Its purpose is to strengthen the flood protection of settlements on the lower course of the Morávka.

== Bodies of water ==
The Morávka Reservoir is built on the river. It was constructed in 1961–1967.

== Nature ==
The upper and middle course of the river is located within the Beskydy Protected Landscape Area.

== See also ==
- List of rivers of the Czech Republic
