= Morávka (Frýdek-Místek District) =

- Municipality
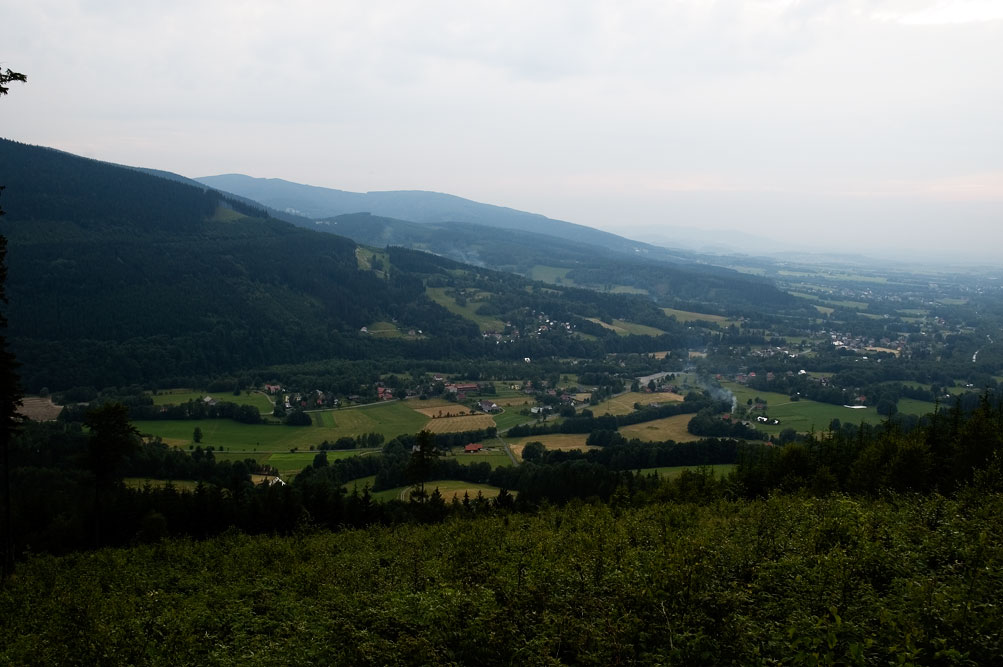
- Lower part of Morávka

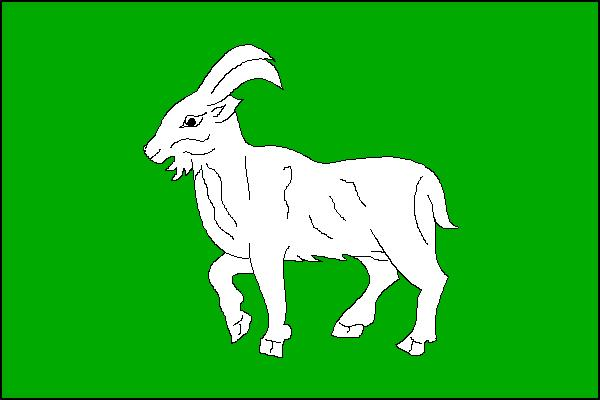
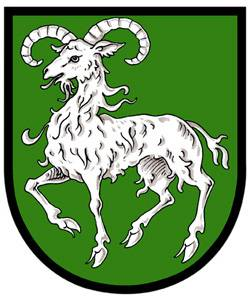
- Flag Coat of arms

- Location in the Czech Republic
- Coordinates: 49°35′46″N 18°31′29″E
- Country: Czech Republic
- Region: Moravian-Silesian
- District: Frýdek-Místek
- Founded: 1615

Area
  - Total: 87.29 km^{2} (33.70 sq mi)
- Elevation: 520 m (1,710 ft)

Population (2026-01-01)
  - Total: 1,266
  - Density: 14.50/km^{2} (37.56/sq mi)
- Time zone: UTC+1 (CET)
  - Summer (DST): UTC+2 (CEST)
- Postal code: 739 04
- Website: www.moravka.info

Morávka (German: Morawka, Polish: Morawka) is a municipality and village in Frýdek-Místek District in the Moravian-Silesian Region of the Czech Republic. It has about 1,300 inhabitants.

== Geography ==
Morávka is located about 15 kilometres (9 mi) southeast of Frýdek-Místek and 30 km (19 mi) southeast of Ostrava. It lies in the historical region of Cieszyn Silesia, on the border with Slovakia. The municipality lies in the Moravian-Silesian Beskids. The highest point is the mountain Malý Travný at 1,100 m (3,609 ft) above sea level.

The Morávka River originates here and flows across the entire municipal territory. The Morávka Reservoir was built on the river within the municipality in 1961–1967.

== History ==
Morávka was established in 1615. It was then a part of the Friedek state country that was split from the Duchy of Teschen in 1573, which was a part of the Kingdom of Bohemia. After World War I and fall of Austria-Hungary, it became a part of Czechoslovakia.

During World War II, the inhabitants of the municipality took part in the anti-Nazi resistance. In December 1944, the Nazis captured the guerrilla group and after interrogation and torture they obtained information about their supporters: 14 people of the village were executed, 10 were deported into a concentration camp.

== Demographics ==
Historical population

Year	Pop.	±%
1869	4,019	—
1880	4,558	+13.4%
1890	4,348	−4.6%
1900	3,839	−11.7%
1910	3,597	−6.3%

Year	Pop.	±%
1921	3,470	−3.5%
1930	3,507	+1.1%
1950	2,611	−25.5%
1961	2,560	−2.0%
1970	1,764	−31.1%

Year	Pop.	±%
1980	1,304	−26.1%
1991	1,007	−22.8%
2001	1,021	+1.4%
2011	1,049	+2.7%
2021	1,189	+13.3%

Source: Censuses

== Transport ==
There are no railways or major roads passing through the municipal territory.

== Sights ==
Noční přechod ('night passage') is the name of the monument to the partisan movement, created in 1968. Since 1978, it has been protected as a national cultural monument.

== See also ==
- Morávka meteorite, a 2000 meteorite
