= Moravian-Silesian Foothills =

Hills in the Czech Republic

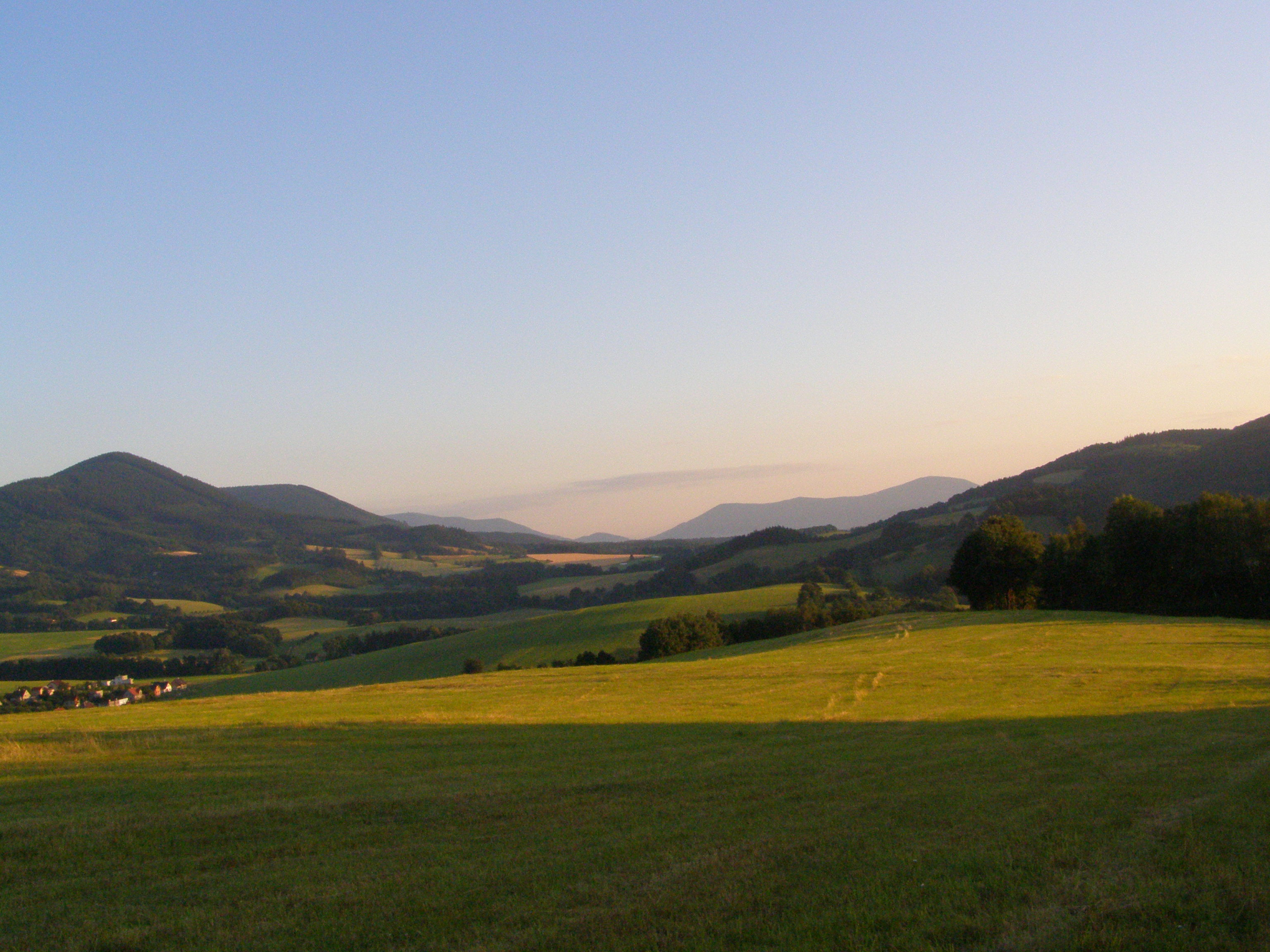
- View towards Ondřejník

Highest point
- Peak: Skalka
- Elevation: 964 m (3,163 ft)

Dimensions
- Length: 92 km (57 mi)
- Area: 1,508 km^{2} (582 mi^{2})

Geography
- Moravian-Silesian Foothills, marked in red and labeled as D1
- Country: Czech Republic
- Region: Moravian-Silesian, Olomouc, Zlín
- Range coordinates: 49°33′N 18°3′E
- Parent range: Western Beskidian Foothills

Geology
- Rock type(s): Flysch, sedimentary rock

Moravian-Silesian Foothills (Czech: Podbeskydská pahorkatina) are foothills and a geomorphological mesoregion of the Czech Republic.

== Geomorphology ==
The Moravian-Silesian Foothills is a mesoregion of the Western Beskidian Foothills macroregion within the Outer Western Carpathians subprovince. It is bordered by the Moravian-Silesian Beskids and Hostýn-Vsetín Mountains on the south and by the Moravian Gate on the north. The landscape is characterized by a erosional-denudational relief based on a deeply denuded nappe structure with numerous nappe debris, remnants of leveled surfaces, breakthrough valleys and cryogenic forms resulting from continental glaciation. The foothills are further subdivided into the microregions of Kelč Uplands, Maleník, Příbor Uplands, Štramberk Highlands, Frenštát Furrow, Třinec Furrow, and Těšín Uplands.

There are a lot of low mountains or high hills. The highest peaks of the Moravian-Silesian Foothills are:

- Skalka, 964 m (3,163 ft)
- Stanovec, 899 m (2,949 ft)
- Ondřejník, 890 m (2,920 ft)
- Suché úbočí, 864 m (2,835 ft)
- Červený kámen, 695 m (2,280 ft)
- Kubánkov, 660 m (2,170 ft)
- Opálená, 641 m (2,103 ft)
- Holý vrch, 631 m (2,070 ft)
- Babí hora, 619 m (2,031 ft)
- Ostružná, 616 m (2,021 ft)

== Geography ==
Moravian-Silesian Foothills are located in the east of the Czech Republic. The territory has an elongated shape, stretching from west to east. Most of the foothills lie in the Moravian-Silesian Region, about one third lies in the Olomouc Region, and a small southwestern part extends into the Zlín Region. The area of the foothills is 1,508 km^{2} (582 sq mi) and the average height is 353 metres (1,158 ft).

The most important rivers are the Olza, Ostravice, Bečva, Stonávka, and Morávka. The largest bodies of water are the Těrlicko and Žermanice reservoirs.

The most populated settlements which lie entirely in the territory are Třinec, Český Těšín, Nový Jičín and Kopřivnice. The cities of Frýdek-Místek and Přerov and the town of Valašské Meziříčí are also partly located there.

== Gallery ==
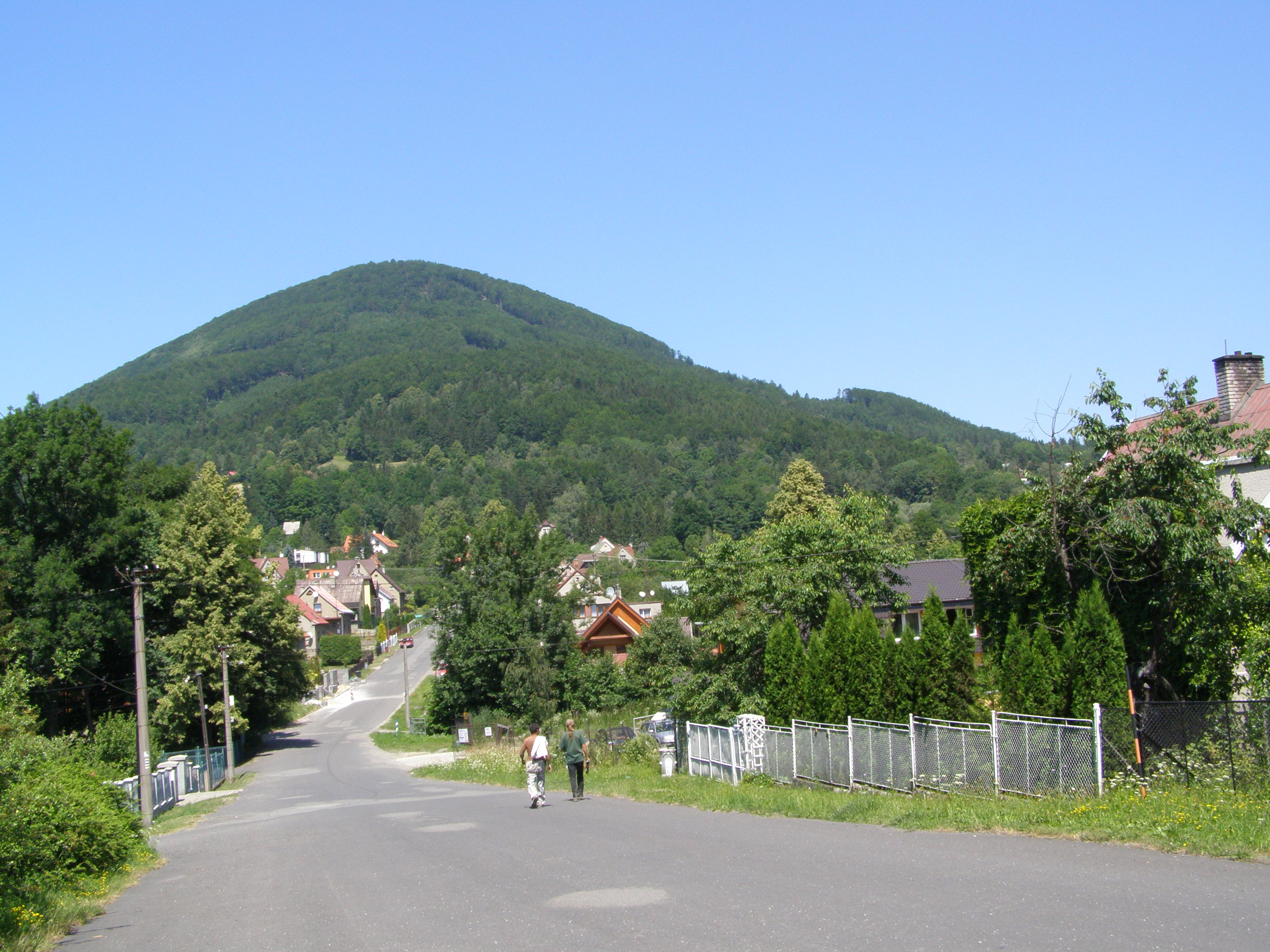
Skalka, the highest mountain

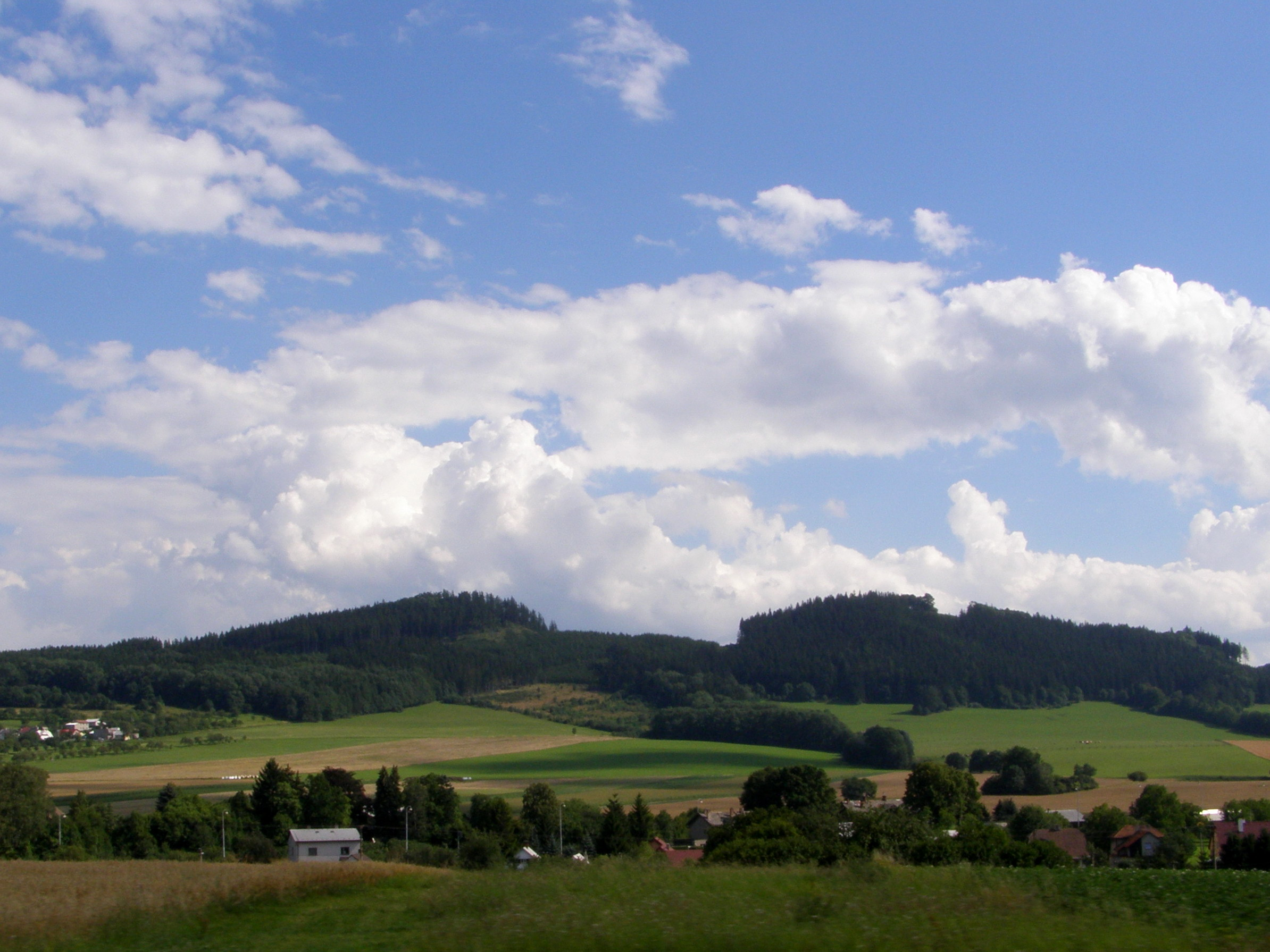
View from Loučka (Vsetín District) to the north

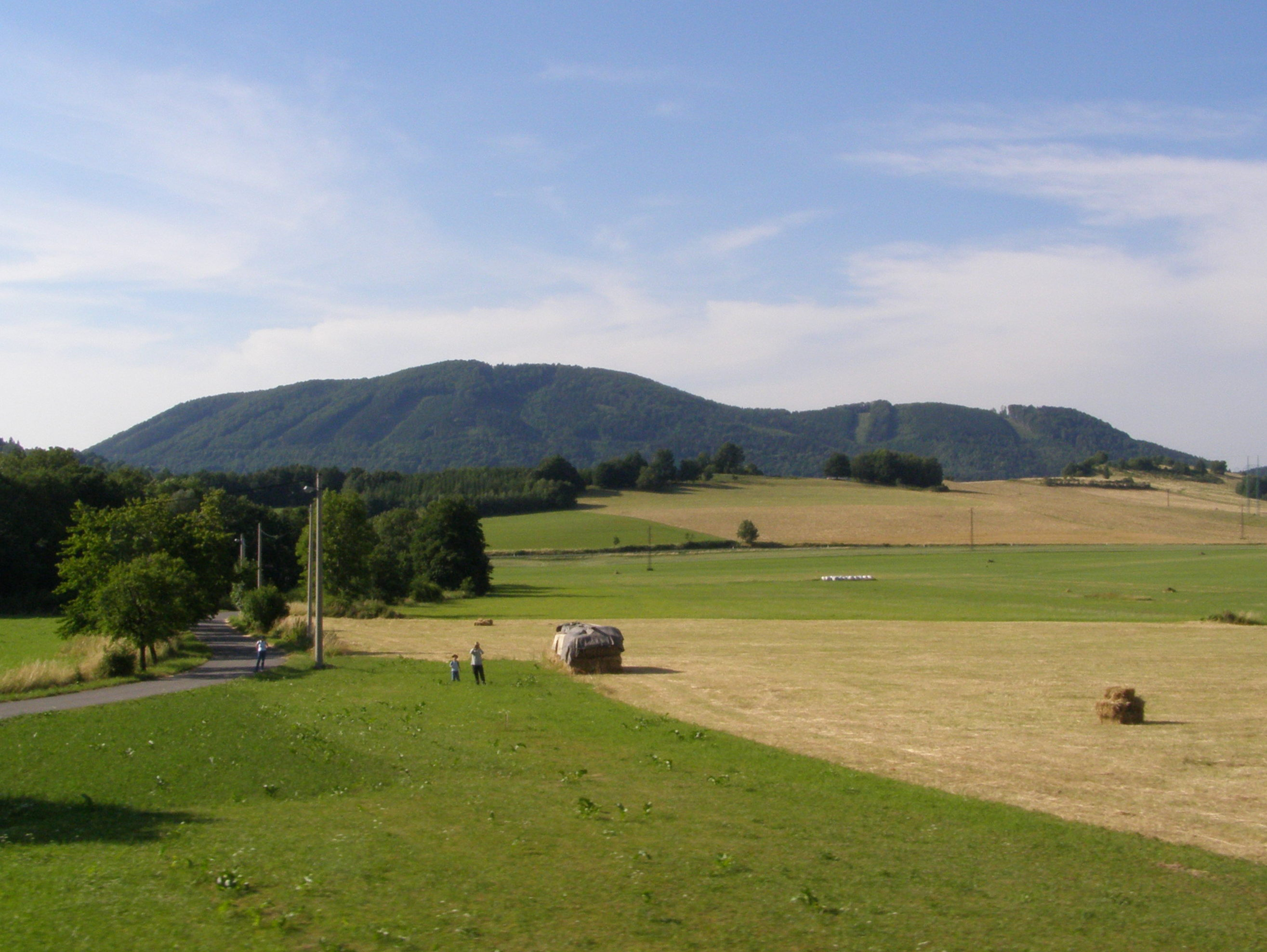
Červený kámen

== See also ==
- Silesian Foothills
