= Sviadnov =

- Municipality
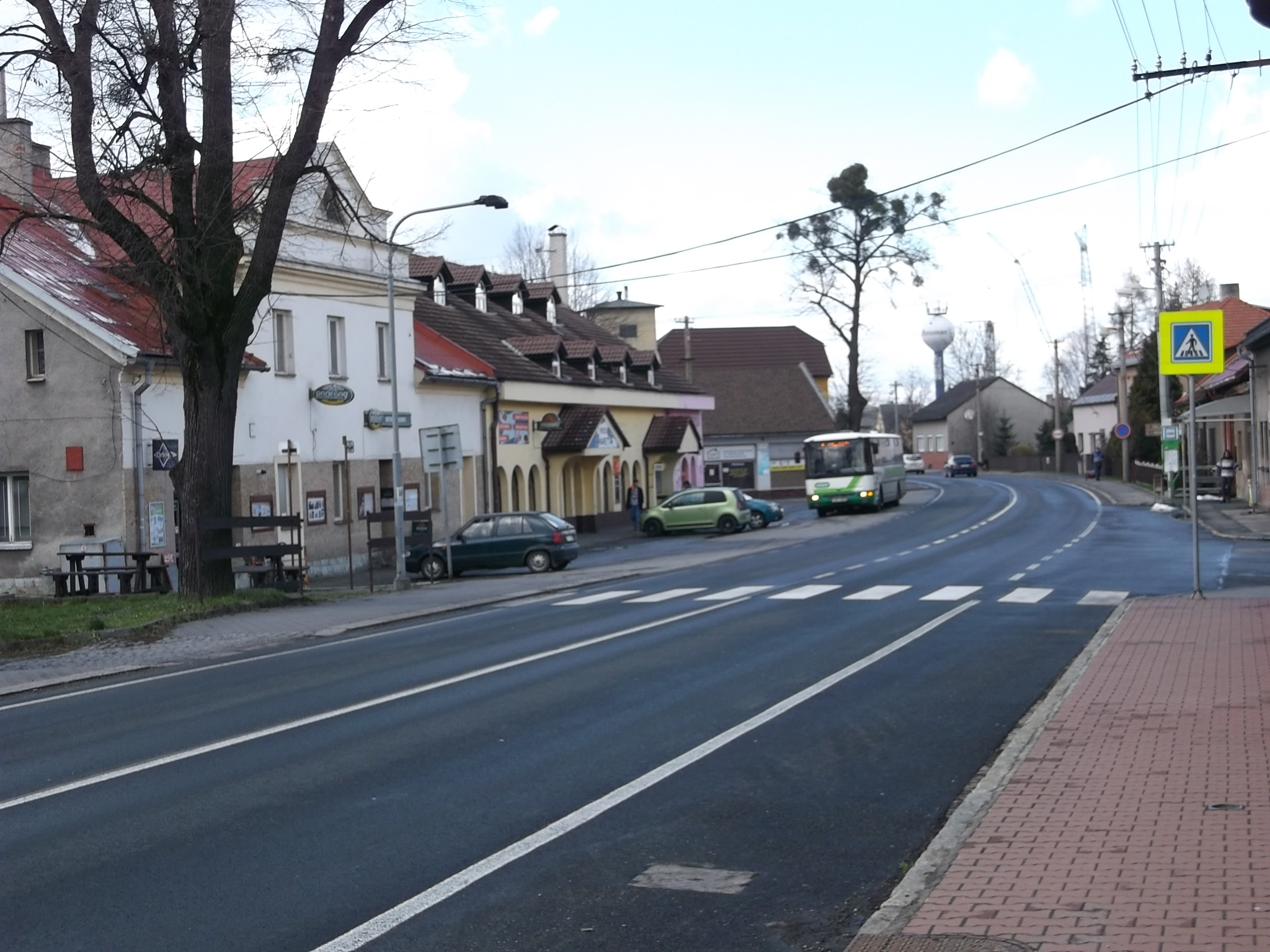
- Centre of Sviadnov

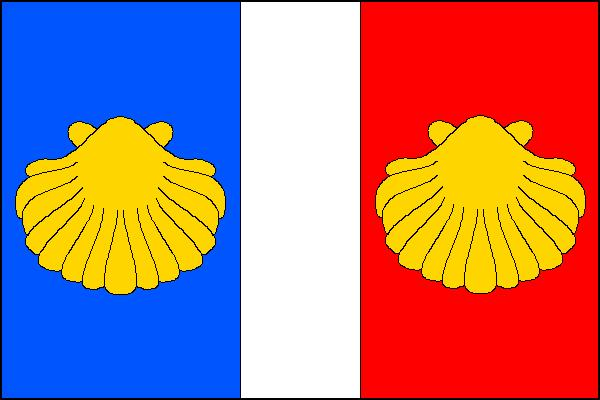
- Flag Coat of arms

- Location in the Czech Republic
- Coordinates: 49°41′21″N 18°19′40″E
- Country: Czech Republic
- Region: Moravian-Silesian
- District: Frýdek-Místek
- First mentioned: 1267

Area
  - Total: 4.75 km^{2} (1.83 sq mi)
- Elevation: 277 m (909 ft)

Population (2026-01-01)
  - Total: 2,252
  - Density: 474/km^{2} (1,230/sq mi)
- Time zone: UTC+1 (CET)
  - Summer (DST): UTC+2 (CEST)
- Postal code: 739 25
- Website: www.sviadnov.cz

Sviadnov is a municipality and village in the Frýdek-Místek District in the Moravian-Silesian Region of the Czech Republic. It has about 2,300 inhabitants.

== Geography ==
Sviadnov is located about 13 kilometres (8 mi) south of Ostrava and is urbanistically fused with the city of Frýdek-Místek. It lies in a flat landscape in the southern tip of the Ostrava Basin. The municipality is situated on the left bank of the Ostravice River.

== History ==
The first written mention of Sviadnov is from 1267. The village was founded by Bishop Bruno von Schauenburg shortly before this year. At the turn of the 14th and 15th centuries, the village was divided into two parts with different owners, and the northern part then became known as Žabeň. Sviadnov belonged to the Místek estate.

Until the second half of the 19th century, Sviadnov was an agricultural village. In the second half of the 19th century, a mechanical weaving mill was built here for the processing of wool and cotton, and Sviadnov was thus industrialised.

== Demographics ==
Historical population

| Year | Pop. | ±% |
|---|---|---|
| 1869 | 693 | — |
| 1880 | 786 | +13.4% |
| 1890 | 1,006 | +28.0% |
| 1900 | 1,428 | +41.9% |
| 1910 | 1,589 | +11.3% |

| Year | Pop. | ±% |
|---|---|---|
| 1921 | 1,421 | −10.6% |
| 1930 | 1,449 | +2.0% |
| 1950 | 1,285 | −11.3% |
| 1961 | 1,120 | −12.8% |
| 1970 | 1,101 | −1.7% |

| Year | Pop. | ±% |
|---|---|---|
| 1980 | 1,075 | −2.4% |
| 1991 | 1,221 | +13.6% |
| 2001 | 1,279 | +4.8% |
| 2011 | 1,536 | +20.1% |
| 2021 | 2,106 | +37.1% |

Source: Censuses

== Transport ==
The D56 motorway from Ostrava to the Frýdek-Místek runs through the municipality.

== Sights ==
A technical monument is a unique mining tower with engine room, which was built in 1965. It is located at the former black coal mine. It is the only protected cultural monument in Sviadnov.

A cultural landmark is the Church of Saint John of Nepomuk. It was built in 1887.
