= Staříč =

- Municipality
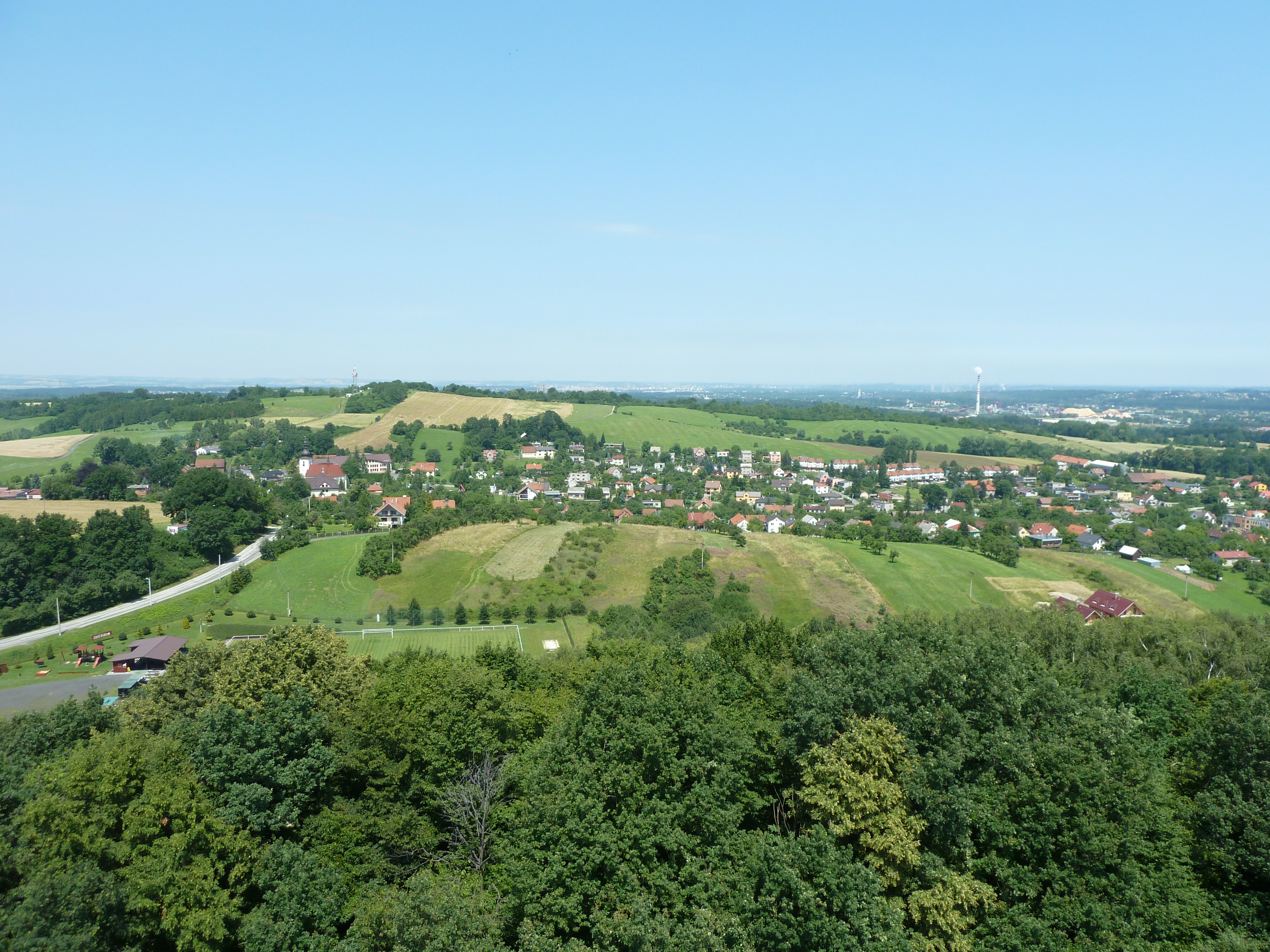
- General view of Staříč

- Flag Coat of arms

- Location in the Czech Republic
- Coordinates: 49°41′9″N 18°16′22″E
- Country: Czech Republic
- Region: Moravian-Silesian
- District: Frýdek-Místek
- First mentioned: 1258

Area
  - Total: 18.97 km^{2} (7.32 sq mi)
- Elevation: 327 m (1,073 ft)

Population (2026-01-01)
  - Total: 2,214
  - Density: 116.7/km^{2} (302.3/sq mi)
- Time zone: UTC+1 (CET)
  - Summer (DST): UTC+2 (CEST)
- Postal code: 739 43
- Website: www.obec-staric.cz

Staříč is a municipality and village in the Frýdek-Místek District in the Moravian-Silesian Region of the Czech Republic. It has about 2,200 inhabitants.

== Etymology ==
According to local historian Vincenc Prasek, the village was presumably named after a person called Stařek or Stařík.

== Geography ==
Staříč is located about 5 kilometres (3 mi) west of Frýdek-Místek and 12 km (7 mi) south of Ostrava. It lies mostly in the Moravian-Silesian Foothills, only the northeastern part of the municipal territory extedns into the Ostrava Basin. The highest point is the hill Strážnice at 393 m (1,289 ft) above sea level.

== History ==
The first written mention of Staříč is from 1258.

== Demographics ==
Historical population

Year	Pop.	±%
1869	1,624	—
1880	1,713	+5.5%
1890	1,829	+6.8%
1900	1,918	+4.9%
1910	2,029	+5.8%

Year	Pop.	±%
1921	1,794	−11.6%
1930	1,894	+5.6%
1950	1,565	−17.4%
1961	1,660	+6.1%
1970	1,581	−4.8%

Year	Pop.	±%
1980	1,692	+7.0%
1991	1,873	+10.7%
2001	1,889	+0.9%
2011	1,980	+4.8%
2021	2,098	+6.0%

Source: Censuses

== Transport ==
The D56 motorway from Ostrava to the Frýdek-Místek runs through the municipality.

== Sights ==
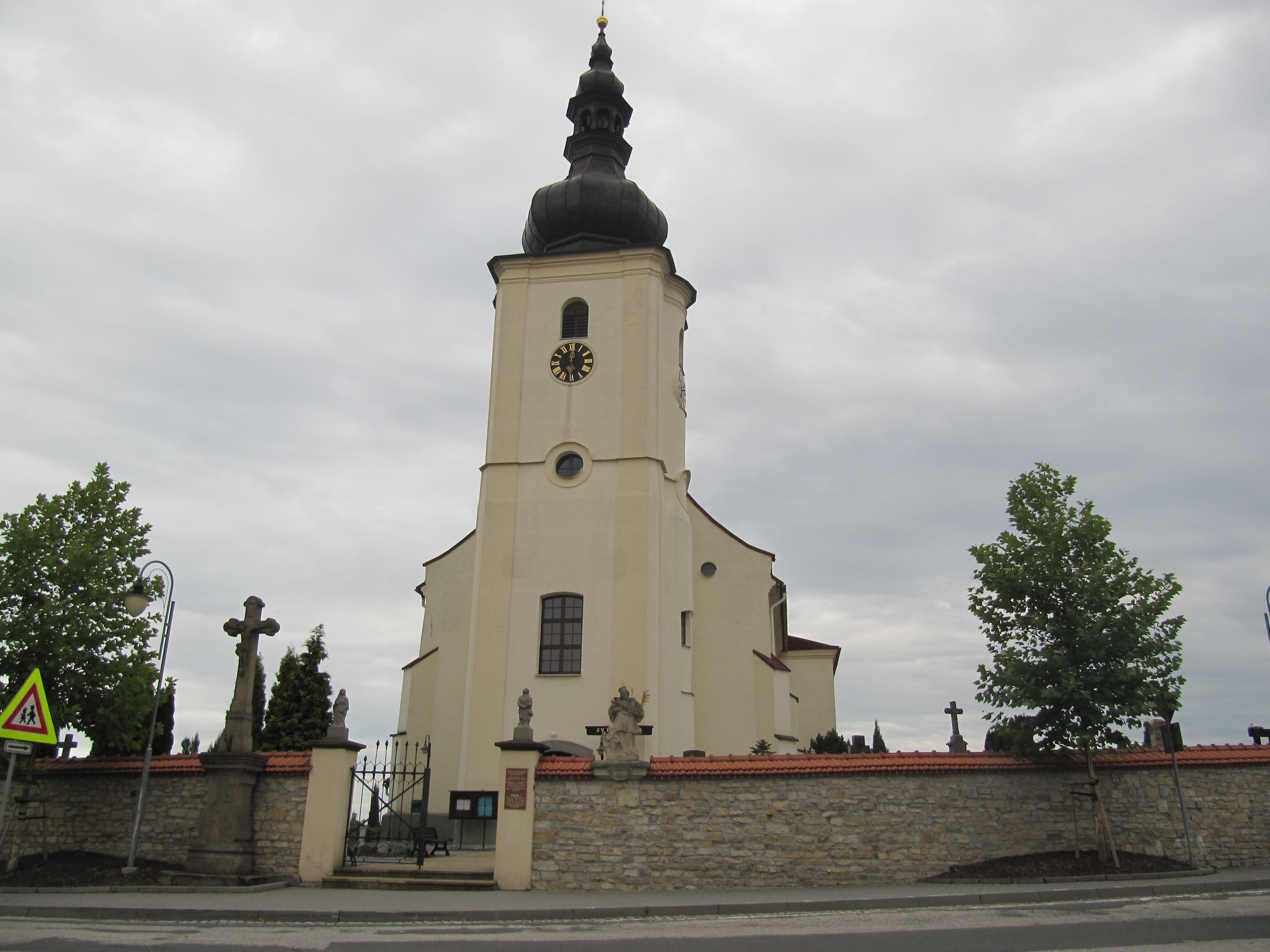
Church of the Finding of the Holy Cross

The main landmark of Staříč is the Church of the Finding of the Holy Cross. It was built in the 16th century and modified in the Baroque style. The tower was added in 1757.

On the hill Okrouhlá is the eponymous observation tower. The tower, which is also used for telecommunication purposes, is 55 m (180 ft) high. The viewing platform is located at a height of 30 m (98 ft).
