= Frýdek-Místek District =

Frýdek-Místek District Okres Frýdek-Místek
- District
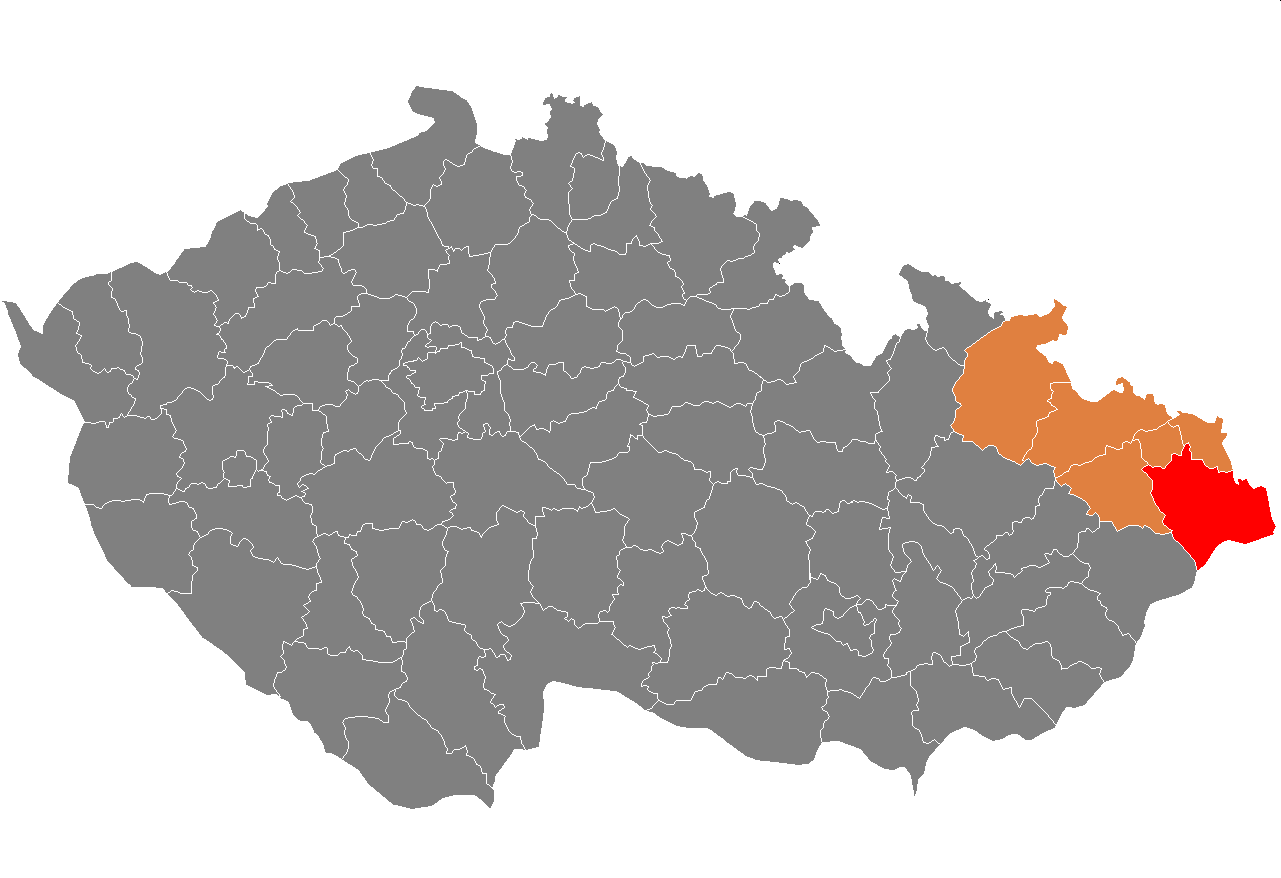
- Location in the Moravian-Silesian Region within the Czech Republic
- Coordinates: 49°37′N 18°29′E
- Country: Czech Republic
- Region: Moravian-Silesian
- Capital: Frýdek-Místek

Area
  - Total: 1,208.45 km^{2} (466.59 sq mi)

Population (2026)
  - Total: 213,442
  - Density: 176.625/km^{2} (457.456/sq mi)
- Time zone: UTC+1 (CET)
  - Summer (DST): UTC+2 (CEST)
- Municipalities: 72
- * Cities and towns: 6
- * Market towns: 0

Frýdek-Místek District (Czech: okres Frýdek-Místek) is a district in the Moravian-Silesian Region of the Czech Republic. Its capital is the city of Frýdek-Místek.

== Administrative division ==
Frýdek-Místek District is divided into four administrative districts of municipalities with extended competence: Frýdek-Místek, Frýdlant nad Ostravicí, Jablunkov and Třinec.

=== List of municipalities ===
Cities and towns are marked in bold:

Baška – Bílá – Bocanovice – Brušperk – Bruzovice – Bukovec – Bystřice – Čeladná – Dobrá – Dobratice – Dolní Domaslavice – Dolní Lomná – Dolní Tošanovice – Fryčovice – Frýdek-Místek – Frýdlant nad Ostravicí – Hnojník – Horní Domaslavice – Horní Lomná – Horní Tošanovice – Hrádek – Hrčava – Hukvaldy – Jablunkov – Janovice – Kaňovice – Komorní Lhotka – Košařiska – Kozlovice – Krásná – Krmelín – Kunčice pod Ondřejníkem – Lhotka – Lučina – Malenovice – Metylovice – Milíkov – Morávka – Mosty u Jablunkova – Návsí – Nižní Lhoty – Nošovice – Nýdek – Ostravice – Palkovice – Paskov – Pazderna – Písečná – Písek – Pražmo – Pržno – Pstruží – Raškovice – Řeka – Řepiště – Ropice – Sedliště – Smilovice – Soběšovice – Staré Hamry – Staré Město – Staříč – Střítež – Sviadnov – Třanovice – Třinec – Vělopolí – Vendryně – Vojkovice – Vyšní Lhoty – Žabeň – Žermanice

== Geography ==
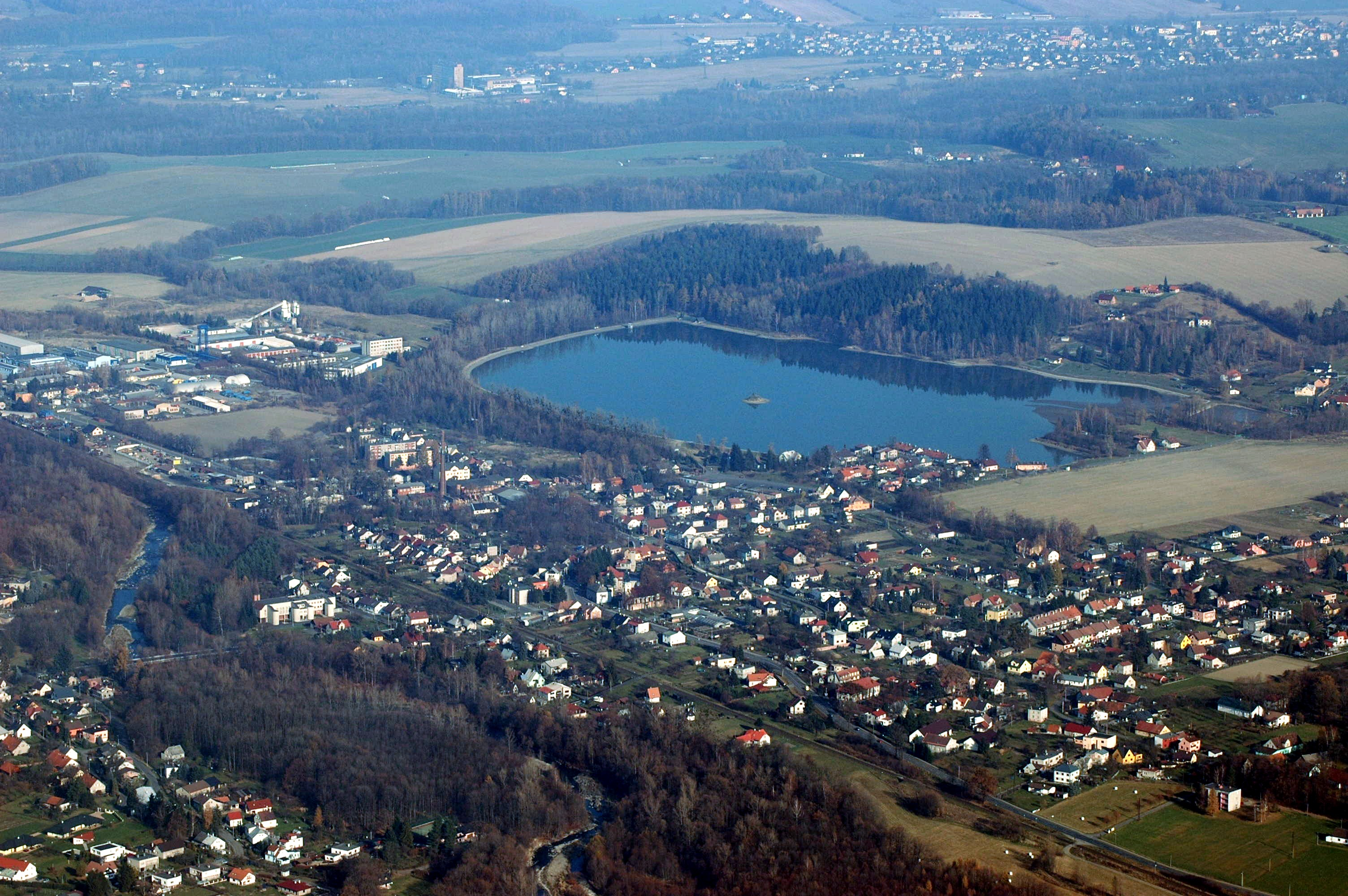
Baška and surrounding landscape

Frýdek-Místek District is the easternmost district of the Czech Republic, bordering Slovakia in the south and Poland in the east and northeast. Part of the historic Trans-Olza region lies within the district. The terrain is very fragmented. The majority of the territory is hilly or mountainous; only in the north it turns into a depression. The territory extends into seven geomorphological mesoregions: Moravian-Silesian Beskids (south and centre), Moravian-Silesian Foothills (northwest and northeast), Ostrava Basin (north), Silesian Beskids (east), Jablunkov Furrow (east), Jablunkov Intermontane (southeast), and Moravian Gate (small part in the north). The highest point of the district is the mountain of Lysá hora in Krásná, with an elevation of 1,324 m (4,344 ft). The lowest point of the district is the river bed of the Ostravice in Paskov and Řepiště at 245 m (804 ft).

Out of the total district area of 1,208.5 km^{2} (466.6 sq mi), agricultural land occupies 451.9 km^{2} (174.5 sq mi), forests occupy 617.5 km^{2} (238.4 sq mi), and water area occupies 23.7 km^{2} (9.2 sq mi). Forests cover 51.1% of the district's area.

The territory is rich in rivers. The longest rivers are the Olza in the east and the Ostravice in the west. Other notable rivers are the Morávka and the Ondřejnice. The Stonávka and Lučina originate here, but soon leave the district. The largest bodies of water are the Šance and Žermanice reservoirs.

The southern part of the territory is protected as the Beskydy Protected Landscape Area.

== Demographics ==
Historical population

Year	Pop.	±%
1869	101,119	—
1880	108,550	+7.3%
1890	113,612	+4.7%
1900	122,051	+7.4%
1910	130,354	+6.8%

Year	Pop.	±%
1921	130,129	−0.2%
1930	148,347	+14.0%
1950	147,257	−0.7%
1961	165,871	+12.6%
1970	183,857	+10.8%

Year	Pop.	±%
1980	202,328	+10.0%
1991	210,106	+3.8%
2001	209,452	−0.3%
2011	207,756	−0.8%
2021	209,322	+0.8%

Source: Censuses

=== Most populous municipalities ===
Name	Population	Area (km^{2})
Frýdek-Místek	53,164	52
Třinec	33,523	85
Frýdlant nad Ostravicí	9,839	22
Bystřice	5,262	16
Jablunkov	5,225	10
Vendryně	4,511	21
Brušperk	4,157	10
Baška	4,056	13
Návsí	3,906	20
Paskov	3,855	12

== Economy ==
The largest employers with headquarters in Frýdek-Místek District and at least 1,000 employees are:

Economic entity	Location	Number of employees	Main activity
Třinec Iron and Steel Works	Třinec	5,000–9,999	Manufacture of iron and steel
Hyundai Motor Manufacturing Czech	Nižní Lhoty	2,500–2,999	Manufacture of automobiles
Frýdek-Místek Hospital	Frýdek-Místek	1,500–1,999	Health care
Mobis Automotive Czech	Nošovice	1,000–1,499	Manufacture of parts for motor vehicles
Strojírny a stavby Třinec	Třinec	1,000–1,499	Manufacture of machinery
Třinec Hospital	Třinec	1,000–1,499	Health care

== Transport ==
The D48 motorway (part of the European route E462) from Nový Jičín to the Czech–Polish border runs through the district. The D56 motorway separates from it in Frýdek-Místek and continues to Ostrava. Another notable road is the R/11 expressway (partly as the I/11 road) from Český Těšín to the Czech–Slovak border, which is part of the European route E75.

== Sights ==
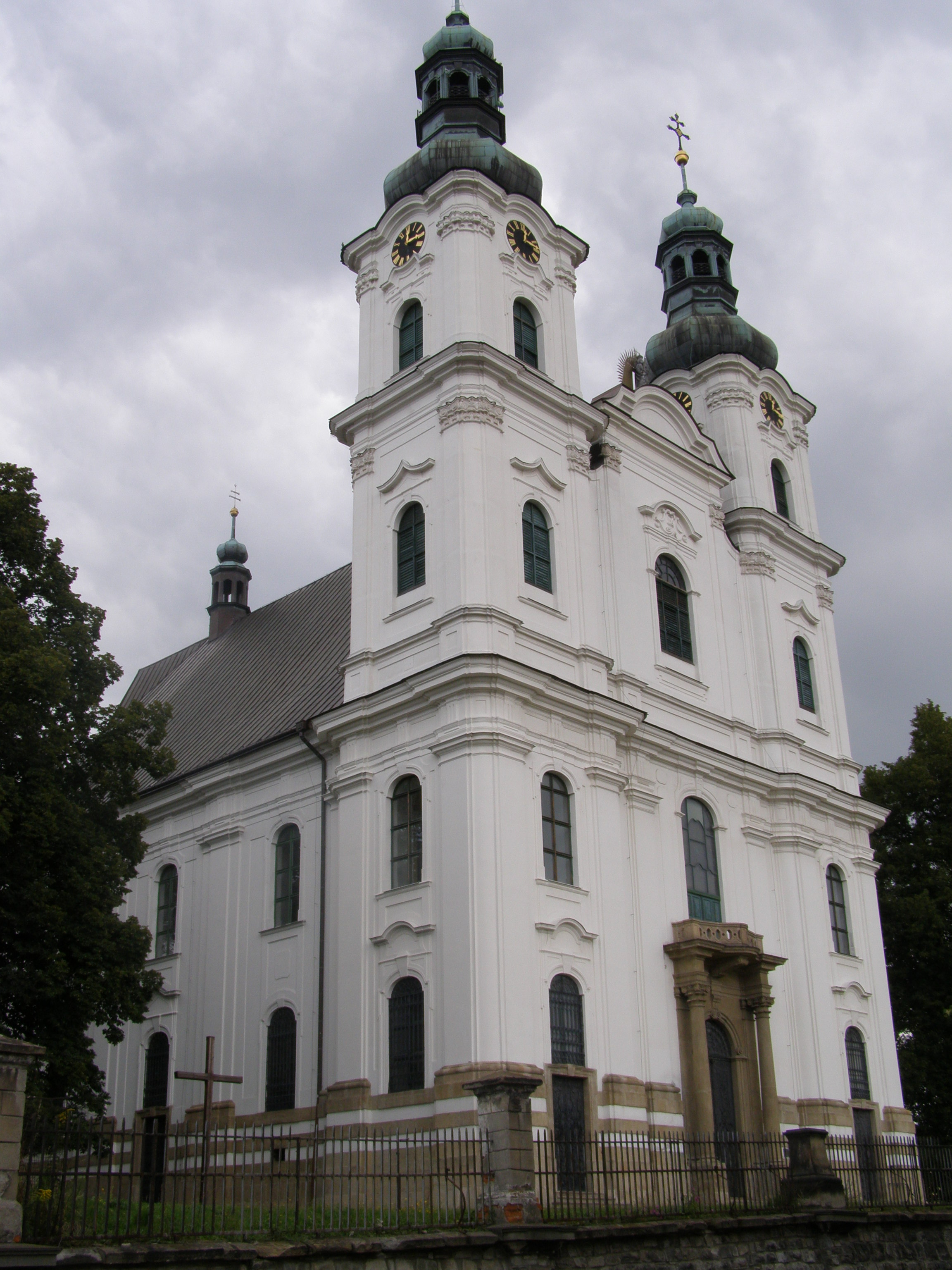
Basilica of the Visitation of Our Lady in Frýdek-Místek

The most important monuments in the district, protected as national cultural monuments, are:

- Pilgrimage site with the Basilica of the Visitation of Our Lady in Frýdek-Místek
- Noční přechod, monument to the partisan movement in Morávka

The best-preserved settlements, protected as monument zones, are:

- Brušperk
- Frýdek
- Místek
- Komorní Lhotka

The most visited tourist destinations are the Zbojník cable car in Bílá, the summit of Lysá hora near Krásná, and Hukvaldy Castle in Hukvaldy.

== See also ==
- Český Těšín District
