= Malenovice =

- Municipality
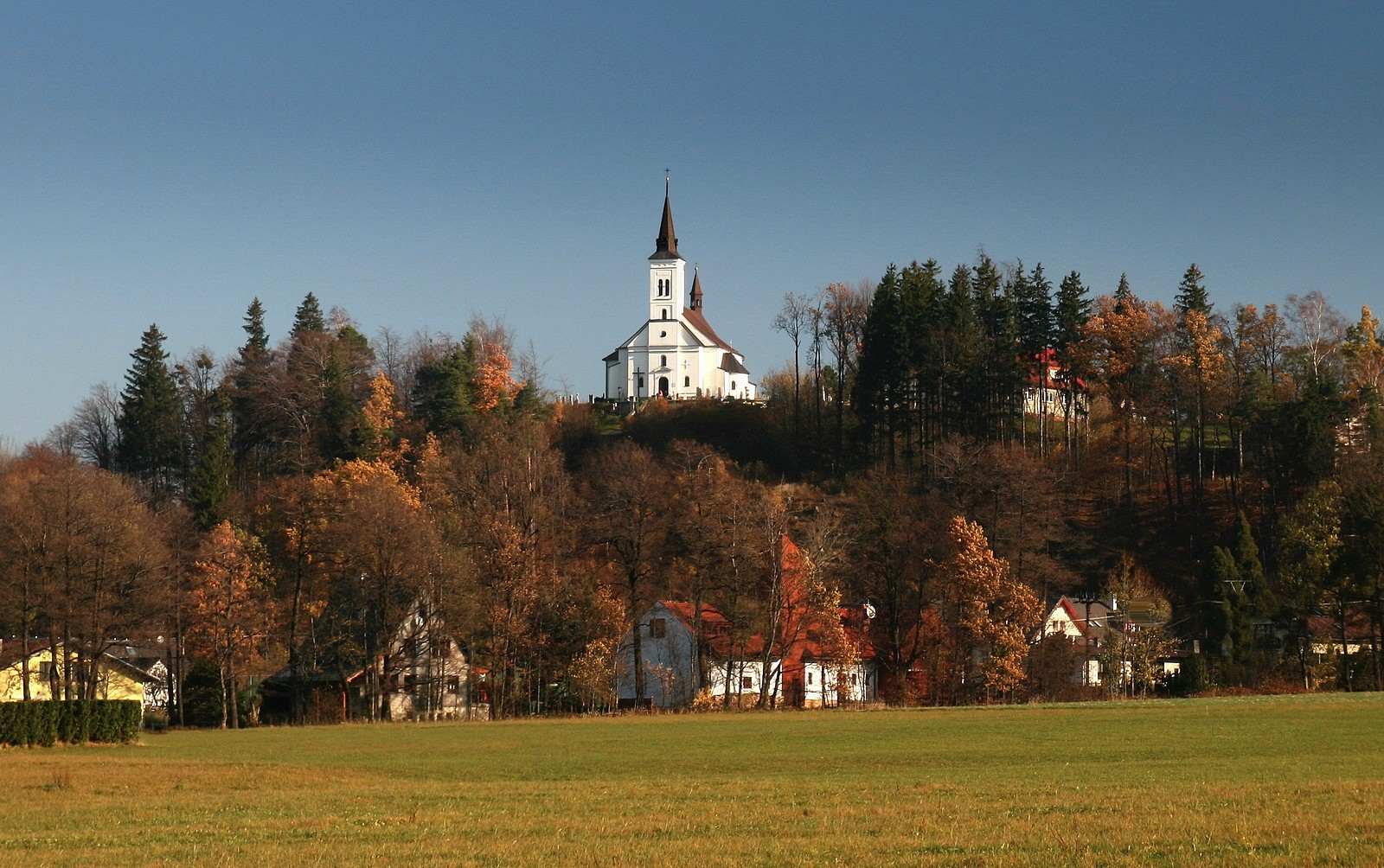
- View towards the Church of St. Ignatius of Loyola

- Flag Coat of arms

- Location in the Czech Republic
- Coordinates: 49°34′46″N 18°24′37″E
- Country: Czech Republic
- Region: Moravian-Silesian
- District: Frýdek-Místek
- First mentioned: 1610

Area
  - Total: 13.00 km^{2} (5.02 sq mi)
- Elevation: 510 m (1,670 ft)

Population (2026-01-01)
  - Total: 784
  - Density: 60.3/km^{2} (156/sq mi)
- Time zone: UTC+1 (CET)
  - Summer (DST): UTC+2 (CEST)
- Postal code: 739 11
- Website: www.malenovice.eu

Malenovice is a municipality and village in Frýdek-Místek District in the Moravian-Silesian Region of the Czech Republic. It has about 800 inhabitants.

== Etymology ==
The name is derived from malina, i.e. 'raspberry'. They grew abundantly here at the time the village was founded.

== Geography ==
Malenovice is located about 11 kilometres (7 mi) south of Frýdek-Místek and 25 km (16 mi) south of Ostrava, in the historical region of Cieszyn Silesia. Most of the municipal territory lies in the Moravian-Silesian Beskids, only a small part on the northwest lies in the Moravian-Silesian Foothills. The summit of the highest mountain of the Moravian-Silesian Beskids, Lysá hora at 1,323 m (4,341 ft) above sea level, is located on the southern municipal border.

== History ==
The first written mention of Malenovice is from 1610. It was then a part of the Frýdek state country, which was a part of the Kingdom of Bohemia.

== Demographics ==
Historical population

Year	Pop.	±%
1869	624	—
1880	660	+5.8%
1890	632	−4.2%
1900	654	+3.5%
1910	690	+5.5%

Year	Pop.	±%
1921	619	−10.3%
1930	586	−5.3%
1950	487	−16.9%
1961	517	+6.2%
1970	390	−24.6%

Year	Pop.	±%
1980	347	−11.0%
1991	274	−21.0%
2001	377	+37.6%
2011	636	+68.7%
2021	779	+22.5%

Source: Censuses

== Transport ==
There are no railways or major roads passing through the municipality.

== Sights ==
The main landmark of Malenovice is the Church of Saint Ignatius of Loyola. It was built in the early Baroque style in 1673.
