= Kozlovice (Frýdek-Místek District) =

- Municipality
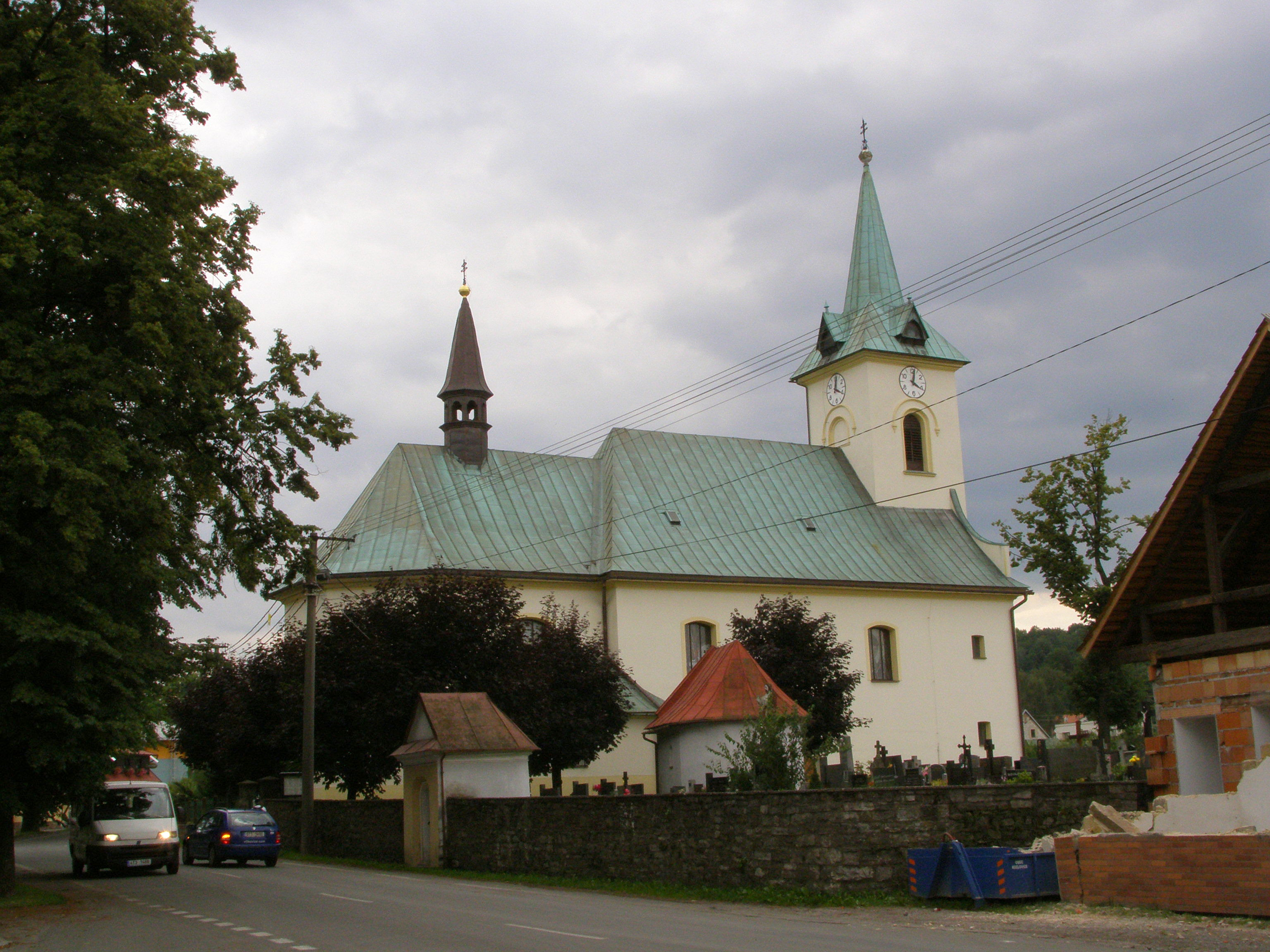
- Church of Saint Michael

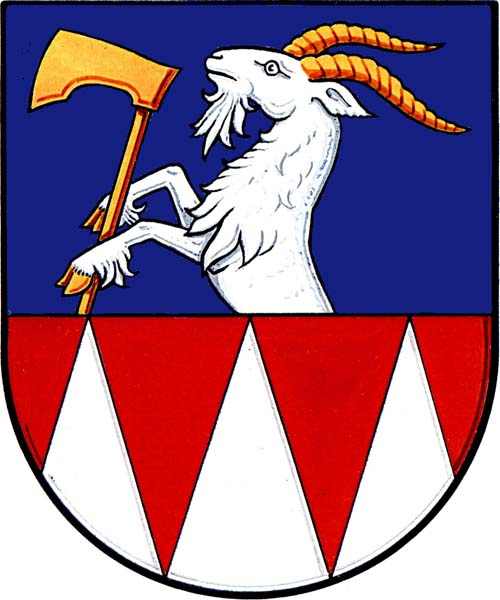
- Coat of arms

- Location in the Czech Republic
- Coordinates: 49°35′25″N 18°15′24″E
- Country: Czech Republic
- Region: Moravian-Silesian
- District: Frýdek-Místek
- First mentioned: 1294

Area
  - Total: 21.10 km^{2} (8.15 sq mi)
- Elevation: 369 m (1,211 ft)

Population (2026-01-01)
  - Total: 3,161
  - Density: 149.8/km^{2} (388.0/sq mi)
- Time zone: UTC+1 (CET)
  - Summer (DST): UTC+2 (CEST)
- Postal code: 739 47
- Website: www.kozlovice.cz

Kozlovice (Czech pronunciation: [ˈkozlovitsɛ]; German: Potzmannsdorf) is a municipality and village in Frýdek-Místek District in the Moravian-Silesian Region of the Czech Republic. It has about 3,200 inhabitants.

== Administrative division ==
Kozlovice consists of two municipal parts (in brackets population according to the 2021 census):

- Kozlovice (2,761)
- Měrkovice (224)

== Geography ==
Kozlovice is located about 11 kilometres (7 mi) southwest of Frýdek-Místek and 23 km (14 mi) south of Ostrava. It lies in the Moravian-Silesian Foothills. The highest point is at 906 m (2,972 ft) above sea level. The Ondřejnice River flows through the municipality.

== History ==
The first written mention of Kozlovice is from 1294. The village of Měrkovice was founded in 1789.

== Demographics ==
Historical population

Year	Pop.	±%
1869	1,816	—
1880	1,865	+2.7%
1890	1,956	+4.9%
1900	2,048	+4.7%
1910	2,120	+3.5%

Year	Pop.	±%
1921	2,003	−5.5%
1930	2,064	+3.0%
1950	2,281	+10.5%
1961	2,551	+11.8%
1970	2,705	+6.0%

Year	Pop.	±%
1980	2,828	+4.5%
1991	2,777	−1.8%
2001	2,822	+1.6%
2011	2,853	+1.1%
2021	2,985	+4.6%

Source: Censuses

== Transport ==
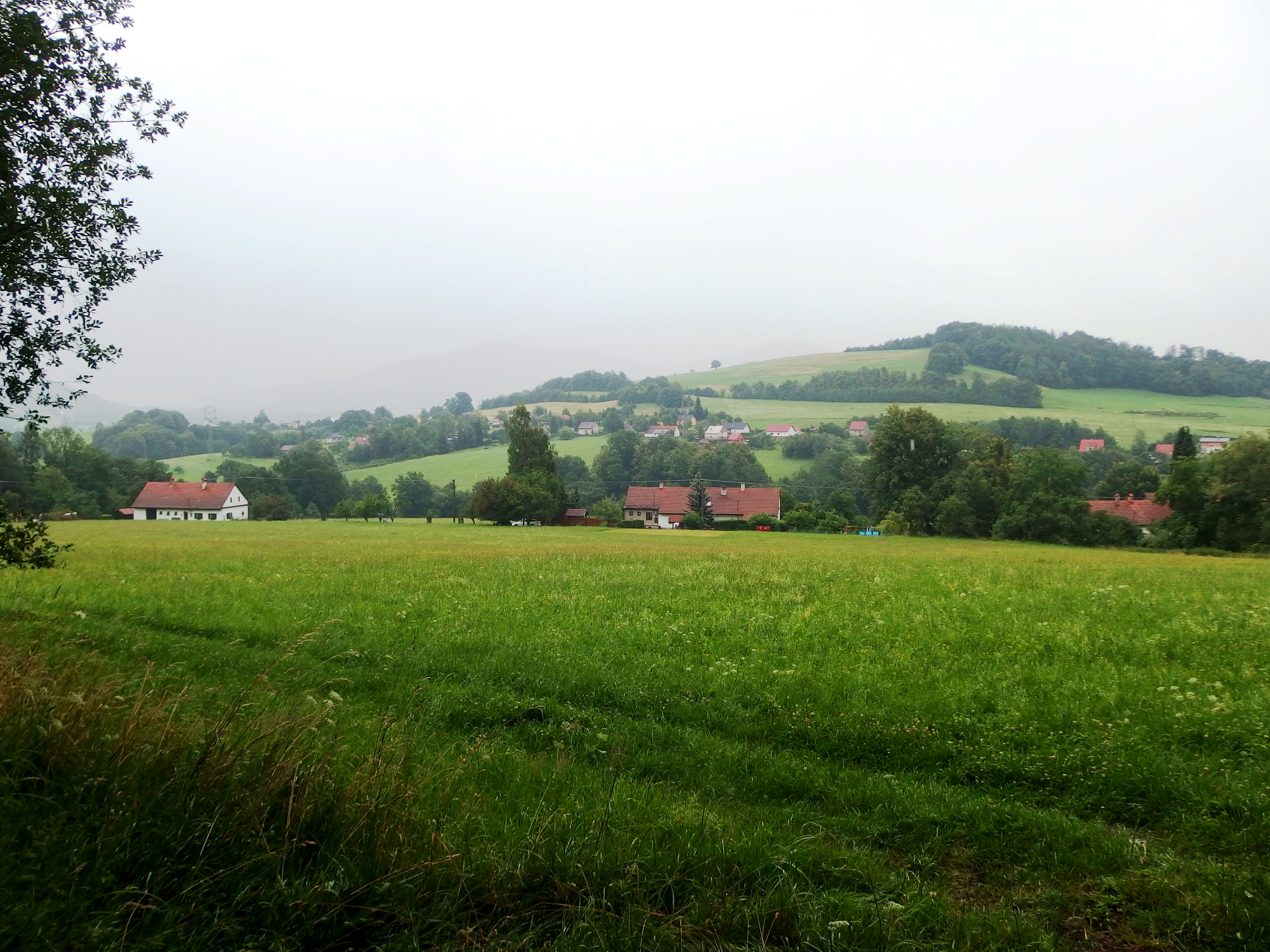
The village of Měrkovice

There are no railways or major roads passing through the municipality.

== Sights ==
The main landmark of Kozlovice is the Church of Saints Barbara and Michael the Archangel. It was built in the Baroque style in 1731–1733. Around 1851, it was modified to its present form.
