= Pazderna =

- Municipality
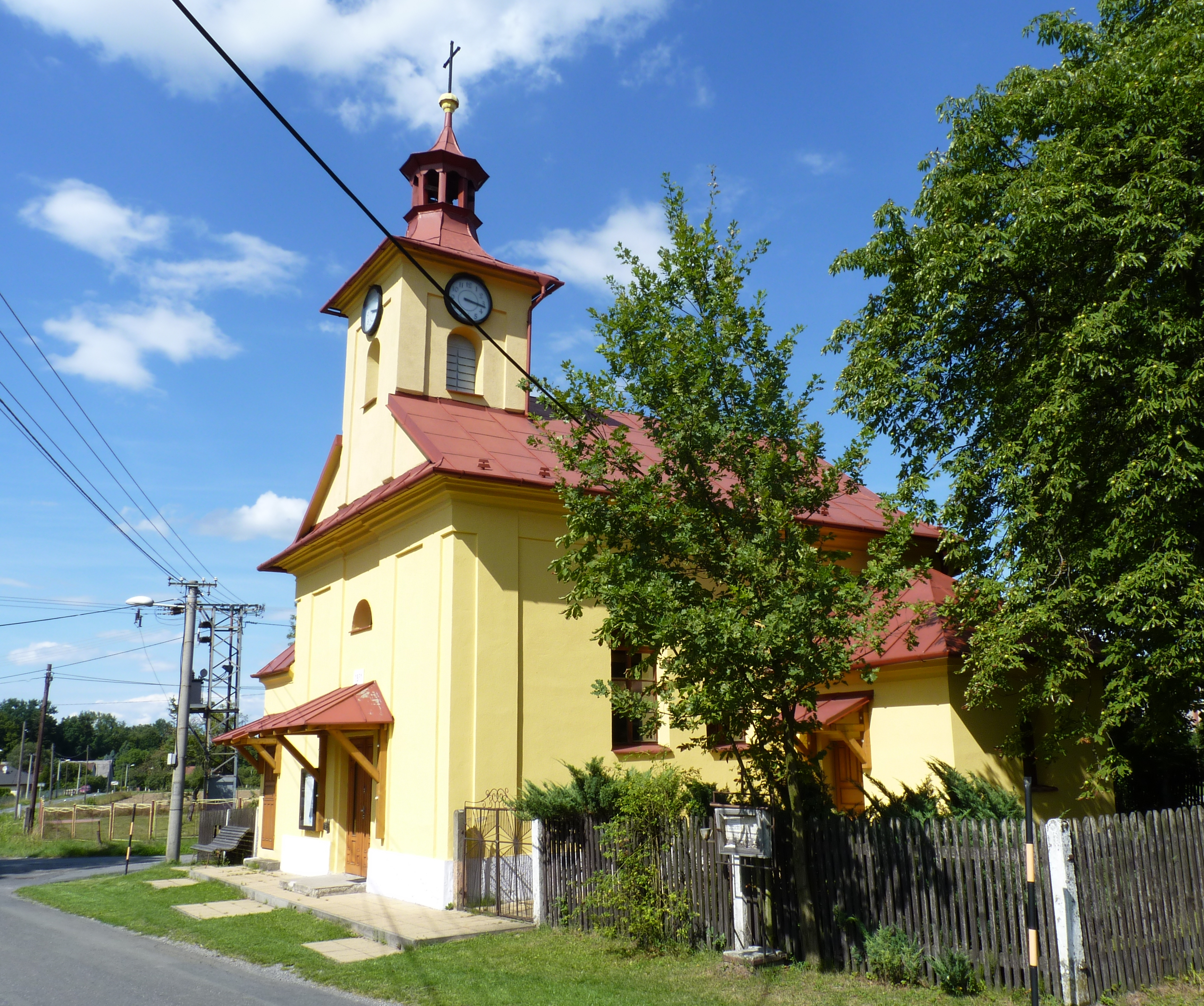
- Chapel of Saint John of Nepomuk

- Flag Coat of arms

- Location in the Czech Republic
- Coordinates: 49°42′15″N 18°26′3″E
- Country: Czech Republic
- Region: Moravian-Silesian
- District: Frýdek-Místek
- First mentioned: 1573

Area
  - Total: 3.22 km^{2} (1.24 sq mi)
- Elevation: 316 m (1,037 ft)

Population (2026-01-01)
  - Total: 422
  - Density: 131/km^{2} (339/sq mi)
- Time zone: UTC+1 (CET)
  - Summer (DST): UTC+2 (CEST)
- Postal code: 739 51
- Website: www.pazderna.eu

Pazderna (Polish: Październa) is a municipality and village in Frýdek-Místek District in the Moravian-Silesian Region of the Czech Republic. It has about 400 inhabitants.

== Etymology ==
The word pazderna was a designation for the house where flax was drying and shives (in Czech pazdeří) was obtained. The village was probably founded around such a house.

== Geography ==
Pazderna is located about 5 kilometres (3 mi) east of Frýdek-Místek and 15 km (9 mi) southeast of Ostrava. It lies in the historical region of Cieszyn Silesia, in the western part of the Moravian-Silesian Foothills. The Pazderůvka Stream flows through the municipality.

== History ==
The first written mention of Pazderna is from 1573, when it was part of the Frýdek state country and had 14 homesteads. It was probably founded only a few years ago. It was then mentioned as Pazdierna in the document sealing the selling of Frýdek by Stanislav II Pavlovský, Bishop of Olomouc, to Bartholomew of Wrbno. After World War I and fall of Austria-Hungary, it became a part of Czechoslovakia.

== Demographics ==
Historical population

| Year | Pop. | ±% |
|---|---|---|
| 1869 | 386 | — |
| 1880 | 368 | −4.7% |
| 1890 | 355 | −3.5% |
| 1900 | 346 | −2.5% |
| 1910 | 357 | +3.2% |

| Year | Pop. | ±% |
|---|---|---|
| 1921 | 322 | −9.8% |
| 1930 | 294 | −8.7% |
| 1950 | 245 | −16.7% |
| 1961 | 289 | +18.0% |
| 1970 | 263 | −9.0% |

| Year | Pop. | ±% |
|---|---|---|
| 1980 | 261 | −0.8% |
| 1991 | 259 | −0.8% |
| 2001 | 269 | +3.9% |
| 2011 | 275 | +2.2% |
| 2021 | 322 | +17.1% |

Source: Censuses

== Transport ==
There are no railways or major roads passing through the municipality.

== Sights ==
There are no protected cultural monuments in the municipality. A landmark is the Chapel of Saint John of Nepomuk, built in 1871.
