= Brušperk =

- Town
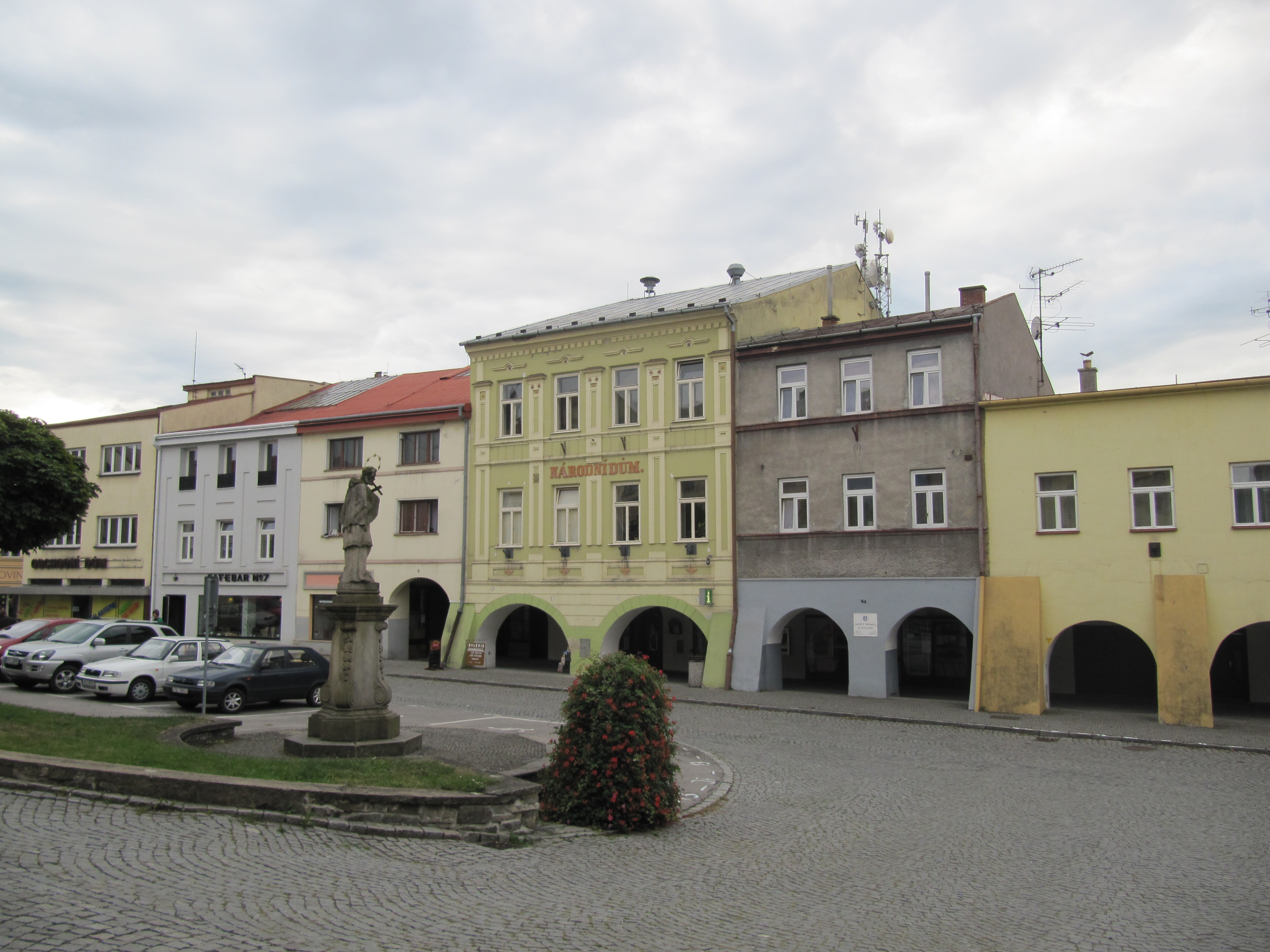
- Town square

- Flag Coat of arms

- Location in the Czech Republic
- Coordinates: 49°42′0″N 18°13′20″E
- Country: Czech Republic
- Region: Moravian-Silesian
- District: Frýdek-Místek
- First mentioned: 1270

Government
  - Mayor: Lucie Krátká

Area
  - Total: 10.27 km^{2} (3.97 sq mi)
- Elevation: 265 m (869 ft)

Population (2026-01-01)
  - Total: 4,157
  - Density: 404.8/km^{2} (1,048/sq mi)
- Time zone: UTC+1 (CET)
  - Summer (DST): UTC+2 (CEST)
- Postal code: 739 44
- Website: www.brusperk-mesto.cz

Brušperk (Czech pronunciation: [ˈbruʃpɛrk]; German: Braunsberg) is a town in Frýdek-Místek District in the Moravian-Silesian Region of the Czech Republic. It has about 4,200 inhabitants. The town is located on the Ondřejnice River in the Moravian-Silesian Foothills.

Brušperk was probably founded in 1267 or 1268 and has been a town since its founding. The historic town centre is well preserved and is protected as an urban monument zone. The main landmark of Brušperk is the Church of Saint George.

== Etymology ==
The initial German name of the town was Brunsberg, meaning "Bruno's hill". It was named after its founder, bishop Bruno von Schauenburg.

== Geography ==
Brušperk is located about 8 kilometres (5 mi) west of Frýdek-Místek and 10 km (6 mi) south of Ostrava. It lies in the Moravian-Silesian Foothills in a relatively flat terrain. The highest point is the hill Na Vrších with an altitude of 312 metres (1,024 ft). The Ondřejnice River flows through the town.

== History ==
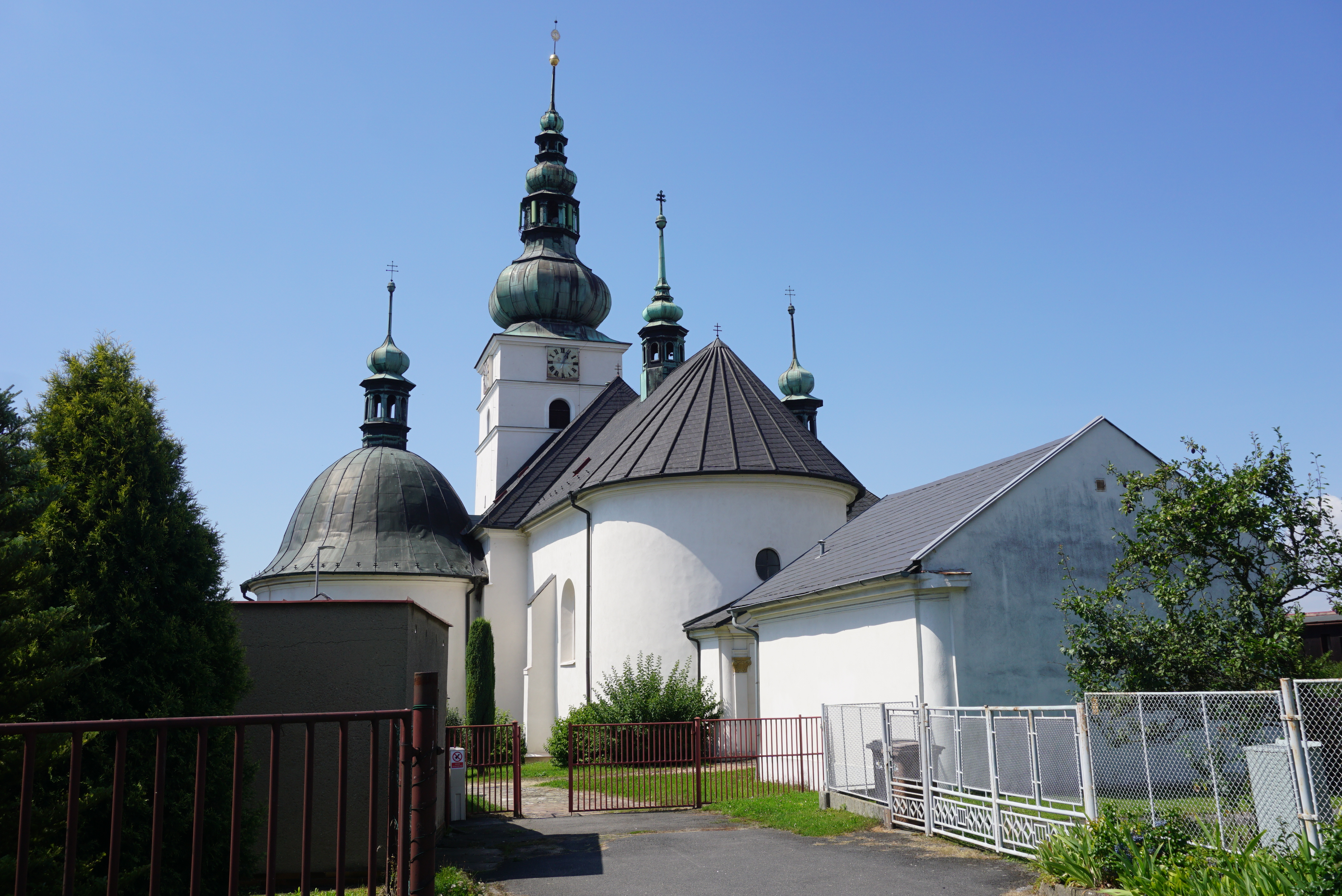
Church of Saint George

The first written mention of Brušperk is from 1270, when it was already referred to as a town. A document mentioning Brušperk in 1269 is a forgery. The town was probably founded in 1267 or 1268. It was one of the administrative and market centres of the Hukvaldy estate. The town received many privileges from the bishops of Olomouc, including the privilege of building town fortifications.

After the suppression of the serf revolt in 1598–1599, the Protestant Brušperk again became a predominantly Catholic town by the end of the 17th century. The re-Catholicisation was most intense especially during the Thirty Years' War. Brušperk was one of the most affected towns by the war. Between 1619 and 1627 it was looted several times, after the occupation by the Swedes in 1643 the population was partly murdered and the buildings destroyed.

The town recovered from the war damage at the beginning of the 18th century. The development of drapery production, which soon became the main craft, played a large part in the renewal of the town. Brušperk was expanding, but the development ended in the 1830s, when industry began to develop in the surrounding towns and the importance of Brušperk thus partially decreased.

== Demographics ==
Historical population

Year	Pop.	±%
1869	3,165	—
1880	2,938	−7.2%
1890	3,101	+5.5%
1900	3,290	+6.1%
1910	3,277	−0.4%

Year	Pop.	±%
1921	2,909	−11.2%
1930	3,123	+7.4%
1950	2,999	−4.0%
1961	3,388	+13.0%
1970	3,392	+0.1%

Year	Pop.	±%
1980	3,558	+4.9%
1991	3,590	+0.9%
2001	3,587	−0.1%
2011	3,827	+6.7%
2021	4,111	+7.4%

Source: Censuses

== Transport ==
There are no railways or major roads passing through the municipality.

== Sights ==
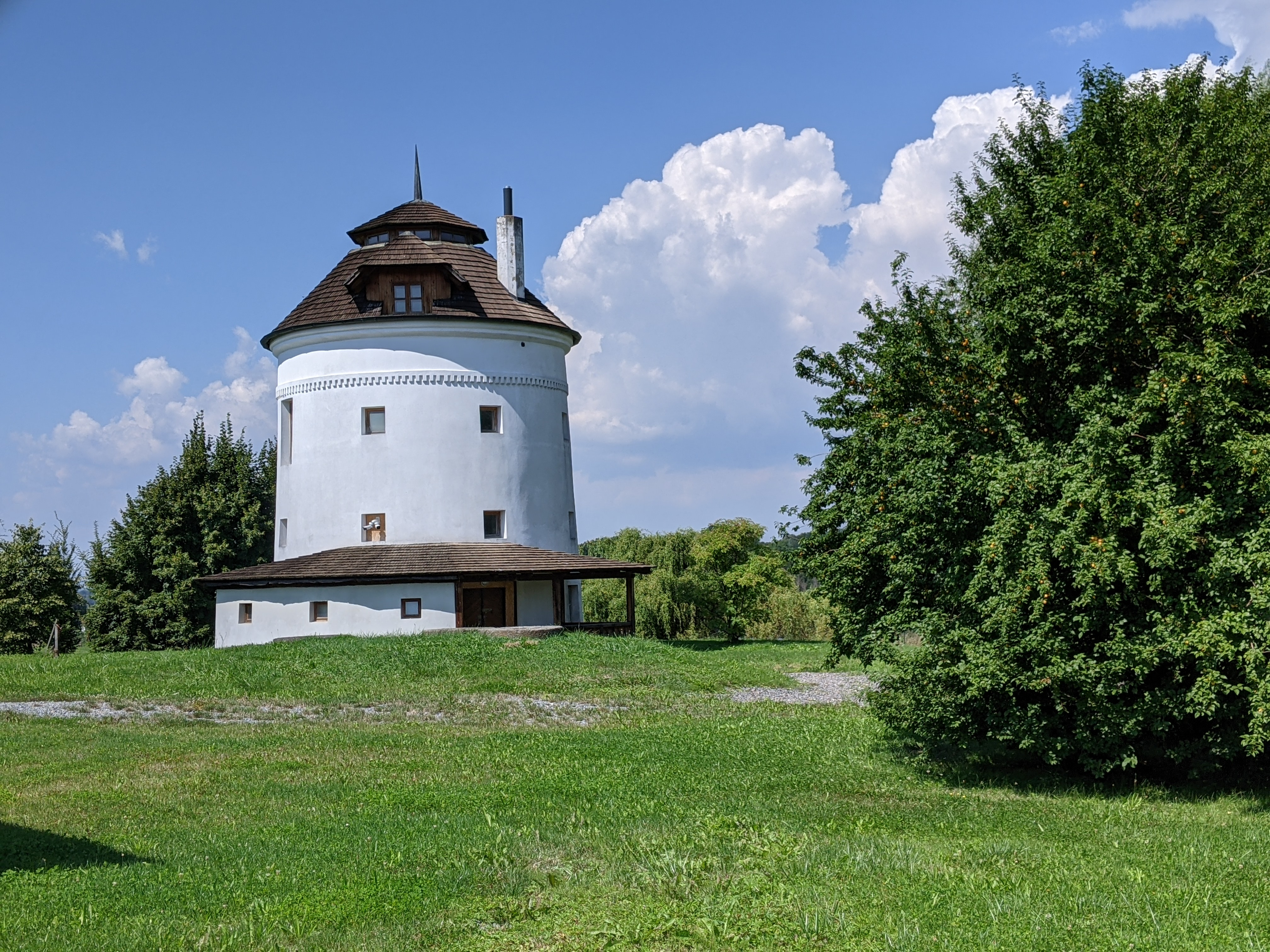
Dutch-type windmill

In the centre of the historic core is the square J. A. Komenského náměstí with Baroque statues of the Holy Trinity and St. John of Nepomuk, and with burgher houses with preserved arcades. The main landmark of Brušperk is the Church of Saint George with a 43 metres (141 ft) high tower. This Renaissance-Baroque church was probably founded before 1305 and has a Gothic core. The area of the church is surrounded by a wall and contains the Stations of the Cross.

A historical monument is a Dutch-type windmill, built around 1830. The blades and technical equipment of the mill have not been preserved.
