= Kaňovice (Frýdek-Místek District) =

- Municipality
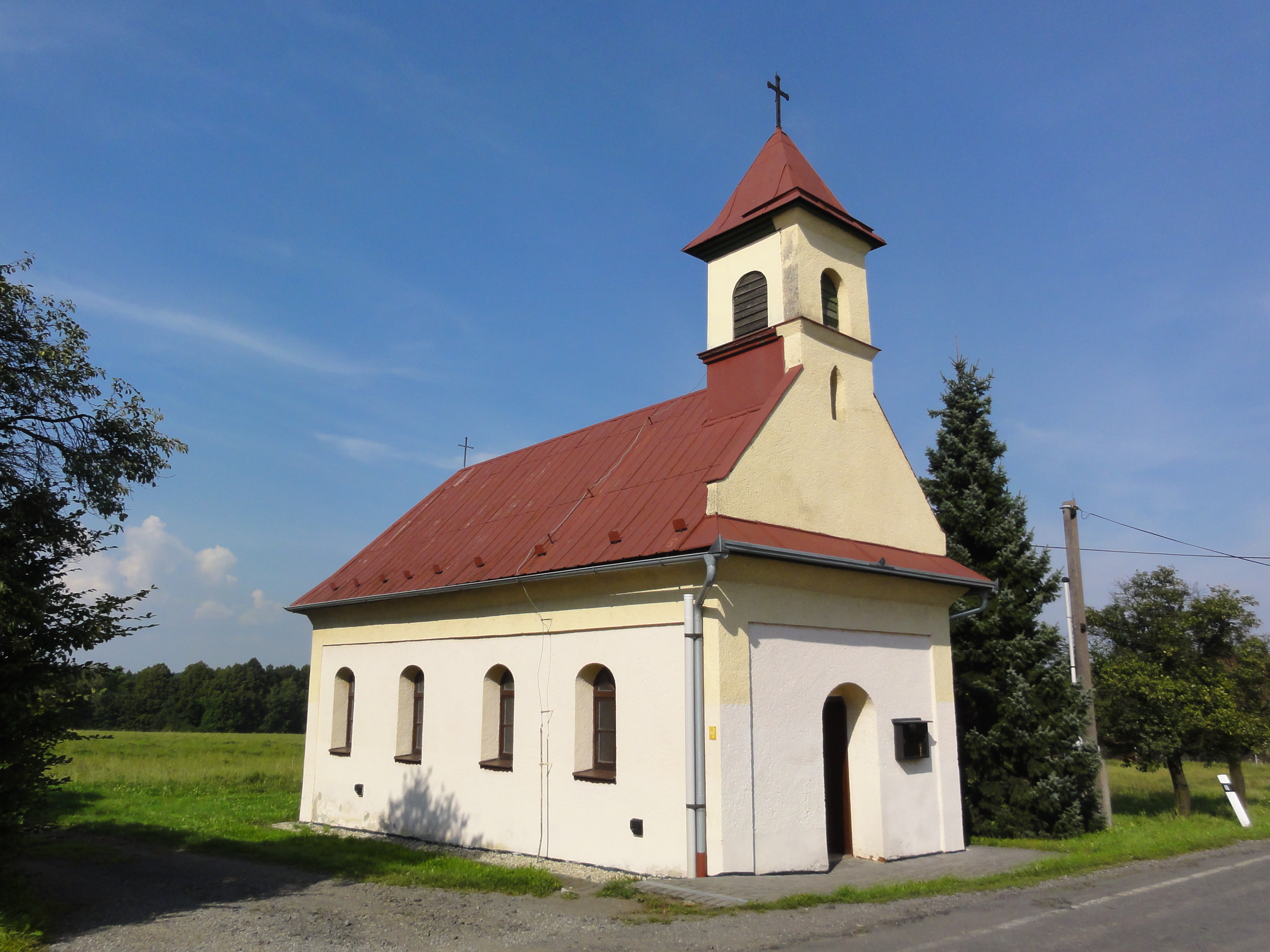
- Chapel of Saint Hedwig

- Flag Coat of arms

- Location in the Czech Republic
- Coordinates: 49°44′39″N 18°23′46″E
- Country: Czech Republic
- Region: Moravian-Silesian
- District: Frýdek-Místek
- Established: 1613

Area
  - Total: 2.59 km^{2} (1.00 sq mi)
- Elevation: 306 m (1,004 ft)

Population (2026-01-01)
  - Total: 380
  - Density: 150/km^{2} (380/sq mi)
- Time zone: UTC+1 (CET)
  - Summer (DST): UTC+2 (CEST)
- Postal code: 739 36
- Website: www.obeckanovice.cz

Kaňovice (German: Kaniowitz, Polish: Kaniowice) is a municipality and village in Frýdek-Místek District in the Moravian-Silesian Region of the Czech Republic. It has about 400 inhabitants.

== Etymology ==
Kaňovice was named after an official named Káňa (Kania), who was commissioned to establish the village.

== Geography ==
Kaňovice is located about 7 kilometres (4 mi) northeast of Frýdek-Místek and 10 km (6 mi) southeast of Ostrava, in the historical region of Cieszyn Silesia. It lies in a flat landscape on the border between the Moravian-Silesian Foothills and Ostrava Basin.

== History ==
The village was established in 1613 of the initiative of Jan Bruntálský of Vrbno, the owner of the Frýdek estate. In 1636, the village had 22 homesteads, a mill and a pond.

== Demographics ==
Historical population

| Year | Pop. | ±% |
|---|---|---|
| 1869 | 247 | — |
| 1880 | 221 | −10.5% |
| 1890 | 216 | −2.3% |
| 1900 | 218 | +0.9% |
| 1910 | 240 | +10.1% |

| Year | Pop. | ±% |
|---|---|---|
| 1921 | 235 | −2.1% |
| 1930 | 200 | −14.9% |
| 1950 | 215 | +7.5% |
| 1961 | 226 | +5.1% |
| 1970 | 206 | −8.8% |

| Year | Pop. | ±% |
|---|---|---|
| 1980 | 199 | −3.4% |
| 1991 | 175 | −12.1% |
| 2001 | 192 | +9.7% |
| 2011 | 298 | +55.2% |
| 2021 | 338 | +13.4% |

Source: Censuses

== Transport ==
There are no railways or major roads passing through the municipality.

== Sights ==
There are no protected cultural monuments in the municipality. The Chapel of Saint Hedwig was built in 1868.
