= Pstruží =

- Municipality
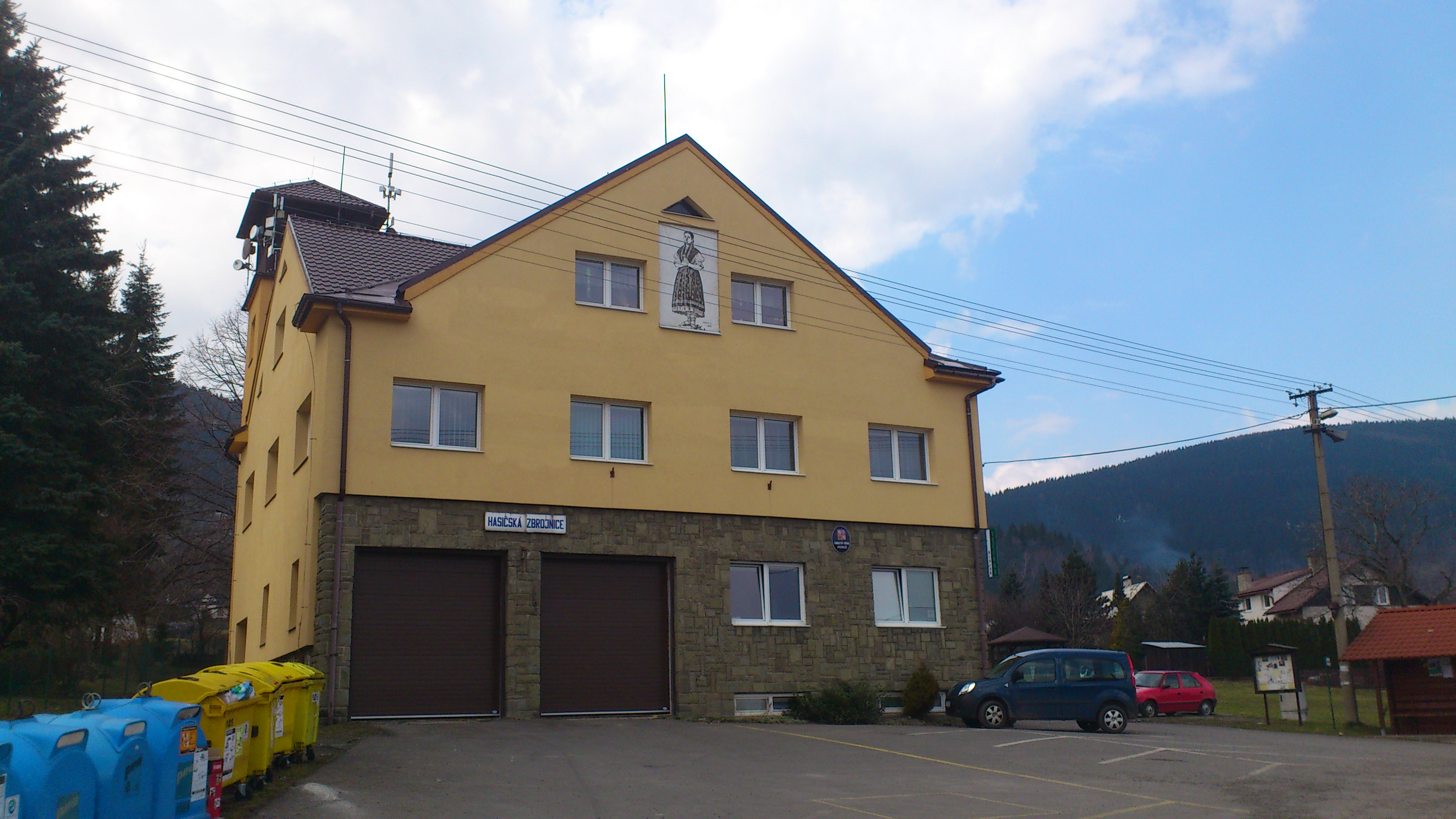
- Municipal office and firehouse

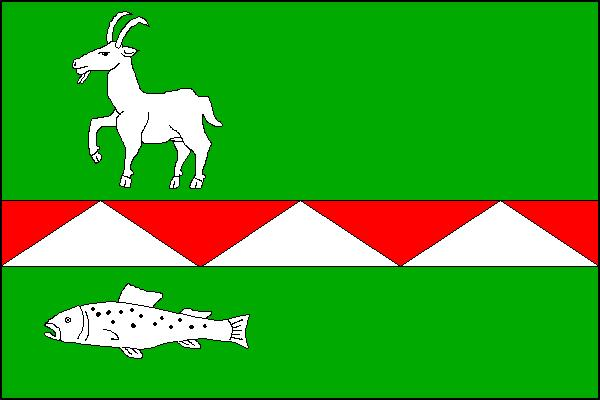
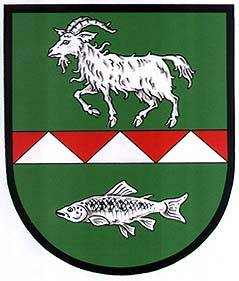
- Flag Coat of arms

- Location in the Czech Republic
- Coordinates: 49°33′59″N 18°19′57″E
- Country: Czech Republic
- Region: Moravian-Silesian
- District: Frýdek-Místek
- First mentioned: 1581

Area
  - Total: 7.14 km^{2} (2.76 sq mi)
- Elevation: 450 m (1,480 ft)

Population (2026-01-01)
  - Total: 1,061
  - Density: 149/km^{2} (385/sq mi)
- Time zone: UTC+1 (CET)
  - Summer (DST): UTC+2 (CEST)
- Postal code: 739 11
- Website: www.pstruzi.cz

Pstruží is a municipality and village in Frýdek-Místek District in the Moravian-Silesian Region of the Czech Republic. It has about 1,100 inhabitants. It lies in the Moravian-Silesian Foothills.

== Demographics ==
Historical population
Year	Pop.	±%
1869	647	—
1880	685	+5.9%
1890	679	−0.9%
1900	708	+4.3%
1910	810	+14.4%
1921	734	−9.4%
1930	789	+7.5%
1950	688	−12.8%
1961	788	+14.5%
1970	722	−8.4%
1980	698	−3.3%
1991	644	−7.7%
2001	705	+9.5%
2011	866	+22.8%
2021	1,020	+17.8%
Source: Censuses
