= Bruzovice =

- Municipality
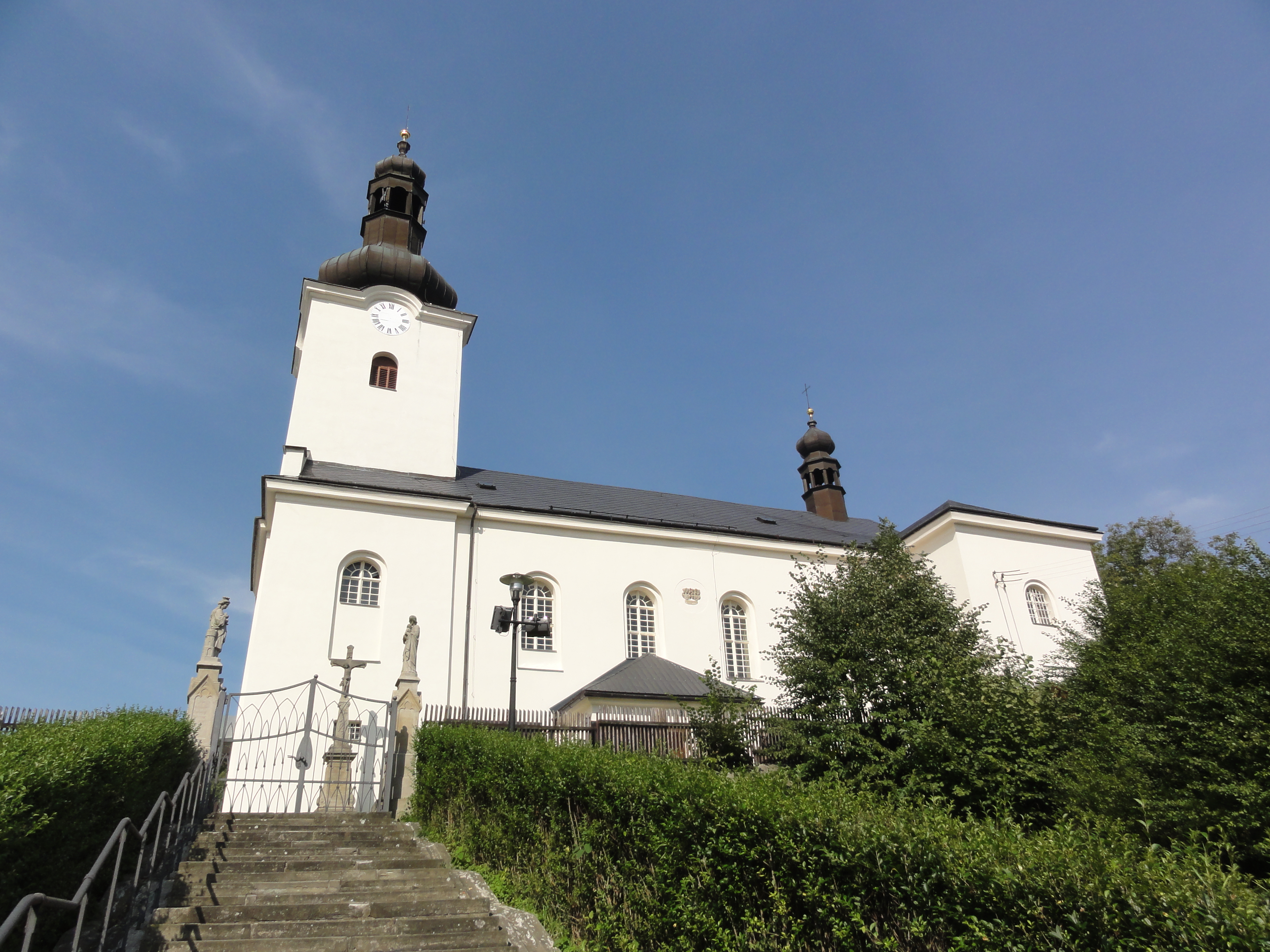
- Church of Saint Stanislaus

- Flag Coat of arms

- Location in the Czech Republic
- Coordinates: 49°43′1″N 18°24′35″E
- Country: Czech Republic
- Region: Moravian-Silesian
- District: Frýdek-Místek
- First mentioned: 1305

Area
  - Total: 15.95 km^{2} (6.16 sq mi)
- Elevation: 309 m (1,014 ft)

Population (2026-01-01)
  - Total: 1,008
  - Density: 63.20/km^{2} (163.7/sq mi)
- Time zone: UTC+1 (CET)
  - Summer (DST): UTC+2 (CEST)
- Postal code: 739 36
- Website: www.bruzovice.cz

Bruzovice (German: Brusowitz, Polish: Bruzowice) is a municipality and village in Frýdek-Místek District in the Moravian-Silesian Region of the Czech Republic. It has about 1,000 inhabitants.

== Etymology ==
The village was named after its founder, Oldřich Brus.

== Geography ==
Bruzovice is located about 4 kilometres (2 mi) northeast of Frýdek-Místek and 13 km (8 mi) southeast of Ostrava. It lies in the Moravian-Silesian Foothills, in the historical region of Cieszyn Silesia. The highest point is at 351 m (1,152 ft) above sea level.

== History ==
The creation of the village was a part of a larger settlement campaign taking place in the late 13th century on the territory of what will be later known as Upper Silesia. The first written mention of Bruzovice is in a Latin document of Diocese of Wrocław called Liber fundationis episcopatus Vratislaviensis from 1305 as Bruschowitz.

Politically the village belonged initially to the Duchy of Teschen and was ruled by a local branch of Piast dynasty. In 1327 the duchy became a fee of Kingdom of Bohemia, which after 1526 became part of the Habsburg monarchy.

The village became a seat of a Catholic parish, mentioned in the register of Peter's Pence payment from 1447 among 50 parishes of Teschen deaconry as Bransowicz.

In 1573 it was sold as one of 16 villages and the town of Friedeck and formed a state country split from the Duchy of Teschen.

After World War I and fall of Austria-Hungary, the municipality became a part of Czechoslovakia. In March 1939 it became a part of Protectorate of Bohemia and Moravia. After World War II, it was restored to Czechoslovakia.

== Demographics ==
Historical population

Year	Pop.	±%
1869	1,176	—
1880	1,105	−6.0%
1890	1,068	−3.3%
1900	1,063	−0.5%
1910	1,039	−2.3%

Year	Pop.	±%
1921	994	−4.3%
1930	1,036	+4.2%
1950	830	−19.9%
1961	862	+3.9%
1970	799	−7.3%

Year	Pop.	±%
1980	757	−5.3%
1991	675	−10.8%
2001	712	+5.5%
2011	738	+3.7%
2021	983	+33.2%

Source: Censuses

== Transport ==
There are no railways or major roads passing through the municipality.

== Sights ==
The main landmark of Bruzovice is the Church of Saint Stanislaus. It was built in the early Baroque style in 1677.
