= Řepiště =

- Municipality
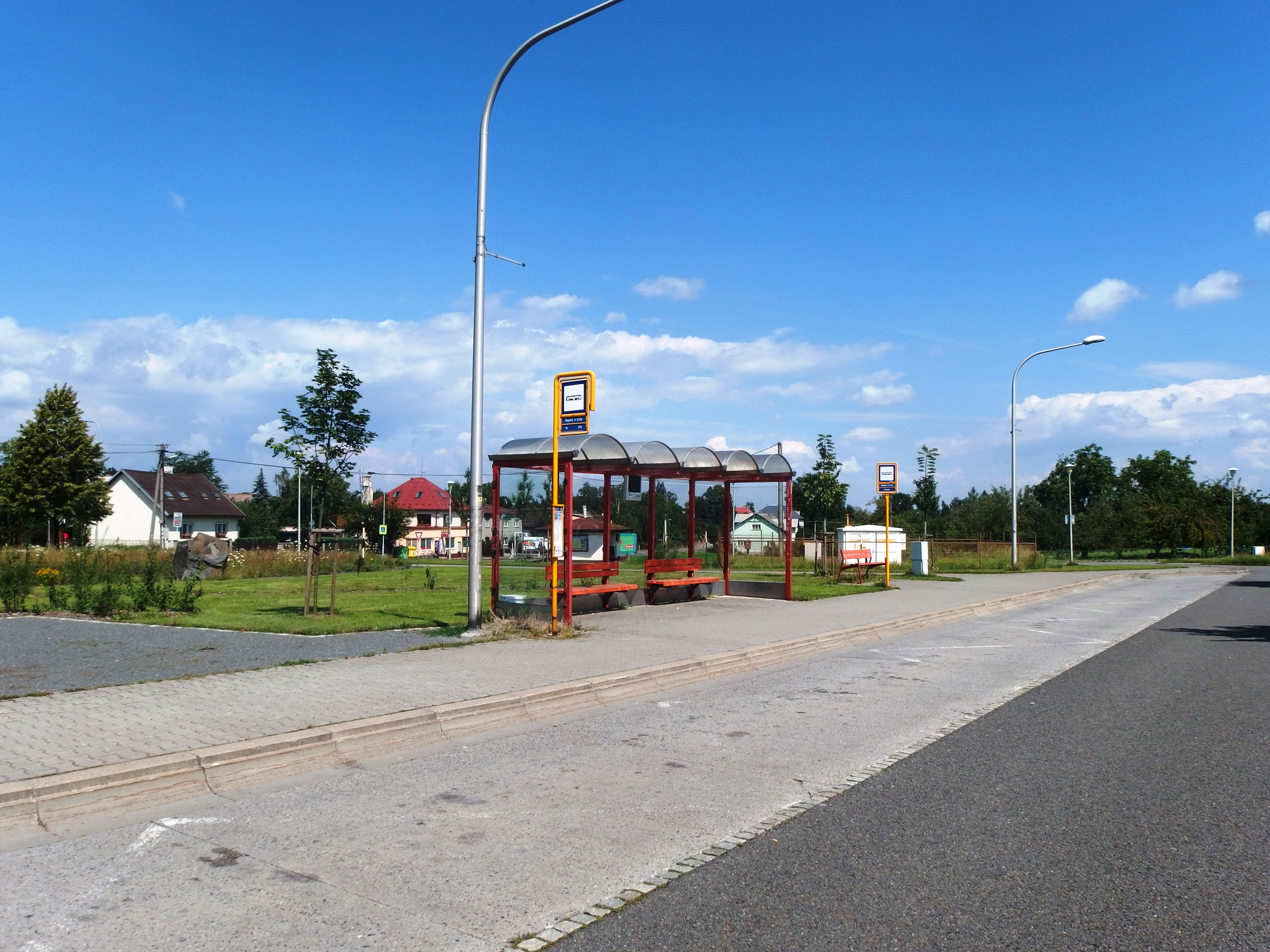
- Bus stop in the centre of Řepiště

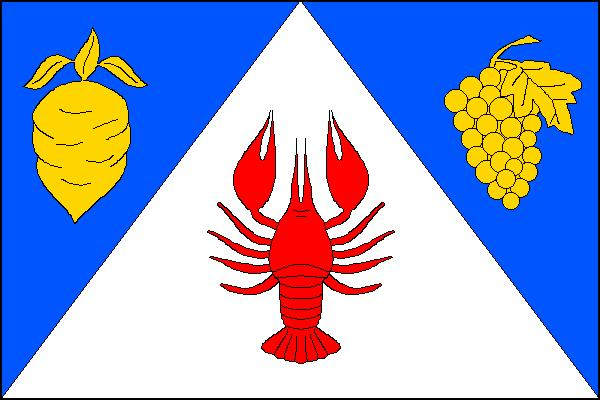
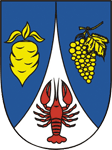
- Flag Coat of arms

- Location in the Czech Republic
- Coordinates: 49°44′0″N 18°19′2″E
- Country: Czech Republic
- Region: Moravian-Silesian
- District: Frýdek-Místek
- First mentioned: 1450

Area
  - Total: 8.00 km^{2} (3.09 sq mi)
- Elevation: 305 m (1,001 ft)

Population (2026-01-01)
  - Total: 1,931
  - Density: 241/km^{2} (625/sq mi)
- Time zone: UTC+1 (CET)
  - Summer (DST): UTC+2 (CEST)
- Postal code: 739 32
- Website: repiste.eu

Řepiště (Polish: Rzepiszcze) is a municipality and village in Frýdek-Místek District in the Moravian-Silesian Region of the Czech Republic. It has about 1,900 inhabitants.

== Geography ==
Řepiště is located about 5 kilometres (3 mi) north of Frýdek-Místek and 6 km (4 mi) south of Ostrava. It lies in the Ostrava Basin, in the historical region of Cieszyn Silesia. The municipality is situated on the right bank of the Ostravice River, which forms the western municipal border.

== History ==
Řepiště was probably founded around 1270 under the name Barutov. The first written mention of the village is in a document from 1450, in which Bolesław II, Duke of Cieszyn bequeath his wife Anna the territory of the Duchy of Teschen.

Řepiště became a seat of a Catholic parish in the second half of 15th century. After 1540s Protestant Reformation prevailed in the Duchy of Teschen and a local Catholic church was taken over by Lutherans. It was taken from them (as one from around fifty buildings in the region) by a special commission and given back to the Roman Catholic Church on 26 March 1654.

== Demographics ==
Historical population

| Year | Pop. | ±% |
|---|---|---|
| 1869 | 895 | — |
| 1880 | 945 | +5.6% |
| 1890 | 1,022 | +8.1% |
| 1900 | 1,067 | +4.4% |
| 1910 | 1,123 | +5.2% |

| Year | Pop. | ±% |
|---|---|---|
| 1921 | 1,192 | +6.1% |
| 1930 | 1,463 | +22.7% |
| 1950 | 1,189 | −18.7% |
| 1961 | 1,388 | +16.7% |
| 1970 | 1,510 | +8.8% |

| Year | Pop. | ±% |
|---|---|---|
| 1980 | 1,619 | +7.2% |
| 1991 | 1,528 | −5.6% |
| 2001 | 1,502 | −1.7% |
| 2011 | 1,690 | +12.5% |
| 2021 | 1,851 | +9.5% |

Source: Censuses

== Transport ==
The train station named Paskov, which serves Řepiště and the neighbouring town of Paskov, is located in the territory of Řepiště. It lies on the railway line Ostrava–Frenštát pod Radhoštěm.

== Sights ==
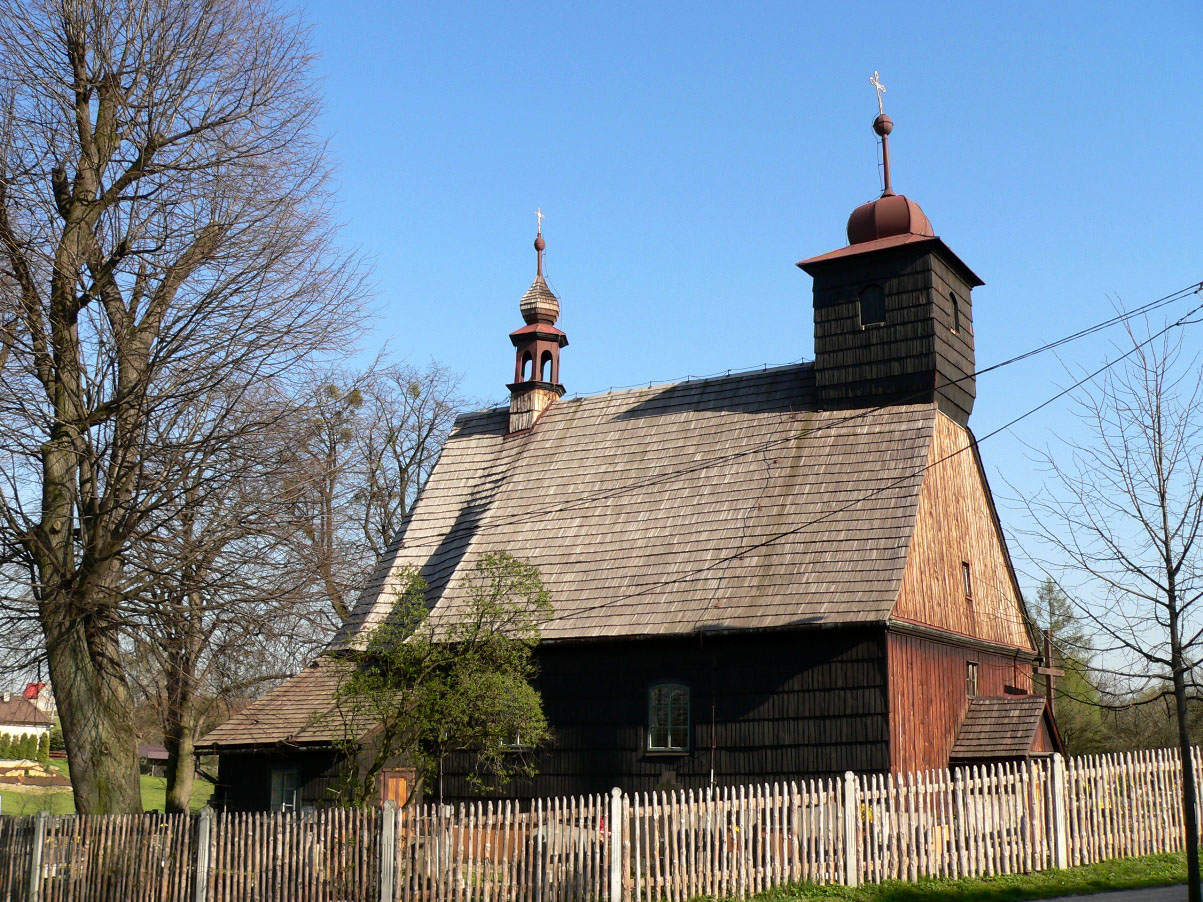
Church of Saint Michael the Archangel

The main landmark of Řepiště is the Church of Saint Michael the Archangel, part of the set of Silesian wooden churches. Based on dendrochronology, it was founded around 1424. At the end of the 17th century, it was extended. After 1819, the church was rebuilt into its present form.
