= Palkovice =

- Municipality
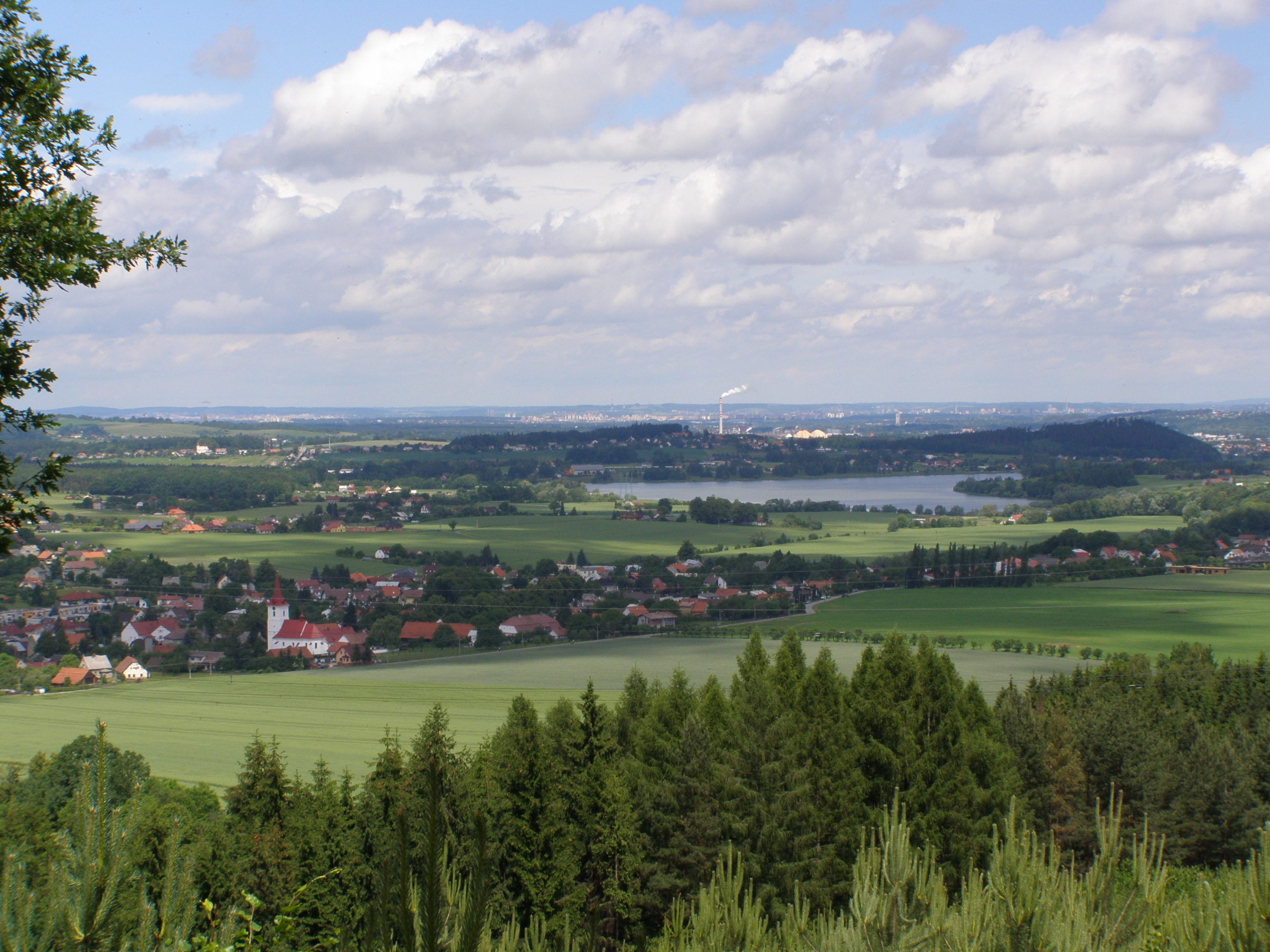
- The village of Palkovice and Olešná Reservoir

- Flag Coat of arms

- Location in the Czech Republic
- Coordinates: 49°38′5″N 18°18′54″E
- Country: Czech Republic
- Region: Moravian-Silesian
- District: Frýdek-Místek
- First mentioned: 1437

Area
  - Total: 21.73 km^{2} (8.39 sq mi)
- Elevation: 325 m (1,066 ft)

Population (2026-01-01)
  - Total: 3,547
  - Density: 163.2/km^{2} (422.8/sq mi)
- Time zone: UTC+1 (CET)
  - Summer (DST): UTC+2 (CEST)
- Postal code: 739 41
- Website: www.palkovice.cz

Palkovice (Czech pronunciation: [ˈpalkovitsɛ]) is a municipality and village in Frýdek-Místek District in the Moravian-Silesian Region of the Czech Republic. It has about 3,500 inhabitants.

== Administrative division ==
Palkovice consists of two municipal parts (in brackets population according to the 2021 census):

- Palkovice (2,855)
- Myslík (511)

== Etymology ==
The name Palkovice is derived from the personal name Palek, meaning "the village of Palek's people".

== Geography ==
Palkovice is located about 4 kilometres (2 mi) southwest of Frýdek-Místek and 18 km (11 mi) south of Ostrava. It lies in the Moravian-Silesian Foothills. The highest point is the hill Kubánkov at 660 m (2,165 ft) above sea level.

== History ==
The first written mention of Palkovice is from 1437. The village was probably founded in the first half of the 14th century. Myslík was first mentioned in 1564.

== Demographics ==
Historical population

Year	Pop.	±%
1869	2,560	—
1880	2,664	+4.1%
1890	2,666	+0.1%
1900	2,806	+5.3%
1910	2,964	+5.6%

Year	Pop.	±%
1921	2,749	−7.3%
1930	2,979	+8.4%
1950	2,642	−11.3%
1961	2,818	+6.7%
1970	2,676	−5.0%

Year	Pop.	±%
1980	2,514	−6.1%
1991	2,387	−5.1%
2001	2,600	+8.9%
2011	3,078	+18.4%
2021	3,366	+9.4%

Source: Censuses

== Transport ==
There are no railways or major roads passing through the municipality.

== Sights ==
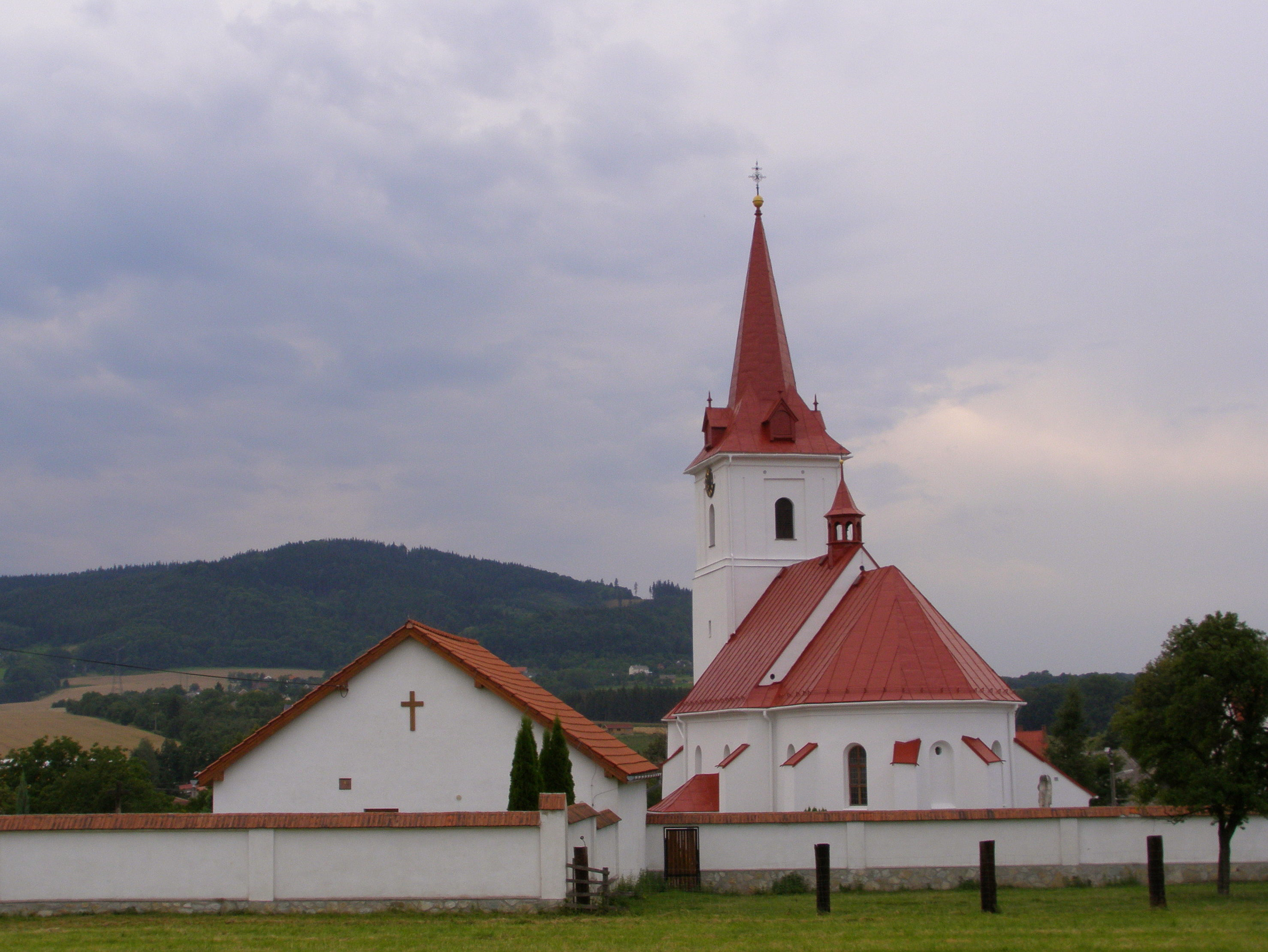
Church of Saint John the Baptist

The main landmark of Palkovice is the Church of Saint John the Baptist. It was built in the late Renaissance style in 1631.
