= Vělopolí =

Vělopolí Wielopole
- Municipality
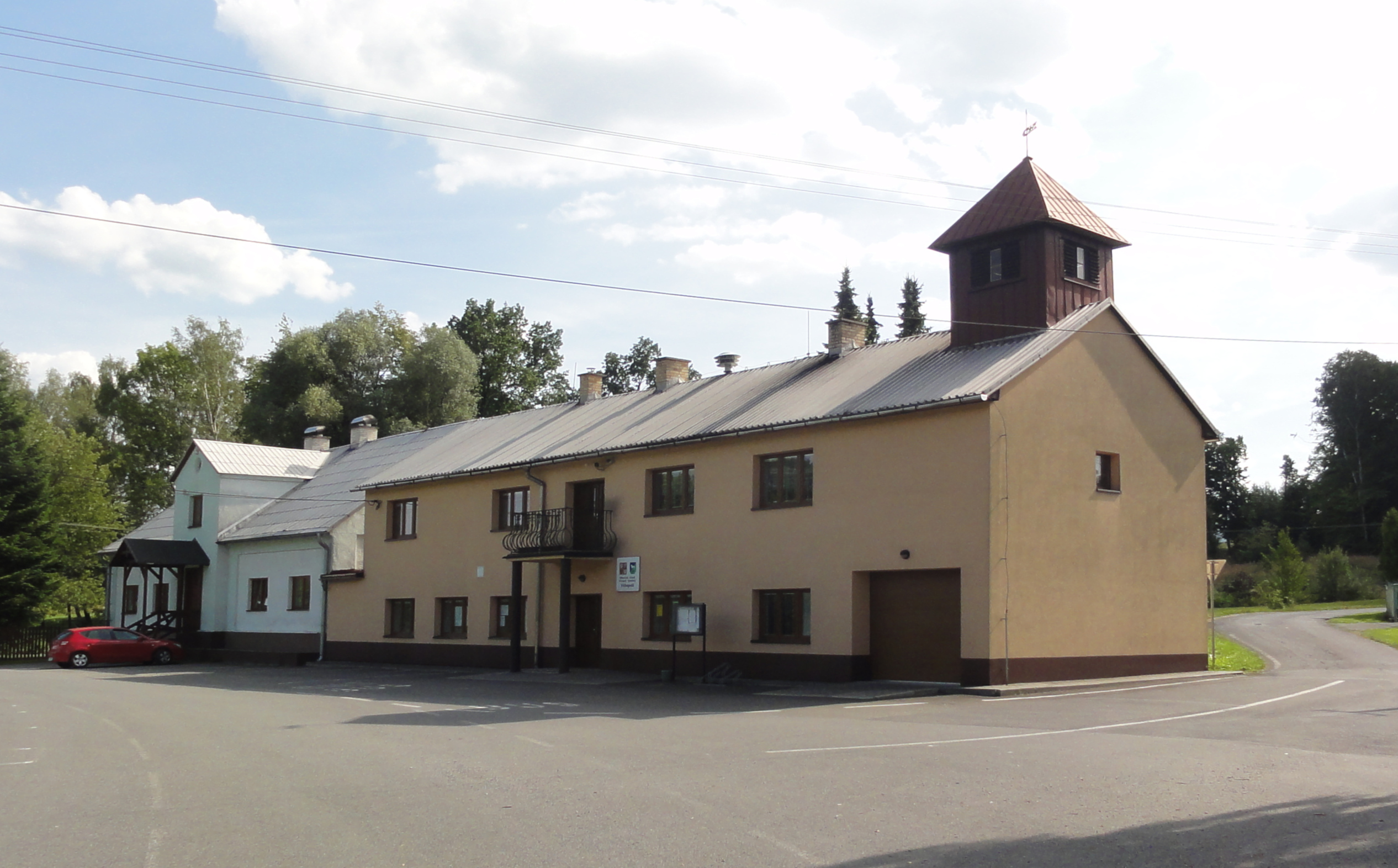
- Municipal office

- Flag Coat of arms

- Location in the Czech Republic
- Coordinates: 49°42′1″N 18°34′15″E
- Country: Czech Republic
- Region: Moravian-Silesian
- District: Frýdek-Místek
- First mentioned: 1448

Area
  - Total: 2.99 km^{2} (1.15 sq mi)
- Elevation: 370 m (1,210 ft)

Population (2026-01-01)
  - Total: 326
  - Density: 109/km^{2} (282/sq mi)
- Time zone: UTC+1 (CET)
  - Summer (DST): UTC+2 (CEST)
- Postal code: 739 59
- Website: www.velopoli.cz

Vělopolí (Czech pronunciation: [ˈvjɛlopoliː]; Polish: Wielopole) is a municipality and village in Frýdek-Místek District in the Moravian-Silesian Region of the Czech Republic. It has about 300 inhabitants. The municipality has a significant Polish minority.

== Etymology ==
The name is means 'large field' in Slavic languages (wiele pole in Polish, velké pole in Czech). It was first written as Wele Pole.

== Geography ==
Vělopolí is located about 14 kilometres (9 mi) east of Frýdek-Místek and 22 km (14 mi) southeast of Ostrava. It lies in the Moravian-Silesian Foothills in the historical region of Cieszyn Silesia.

== History ==
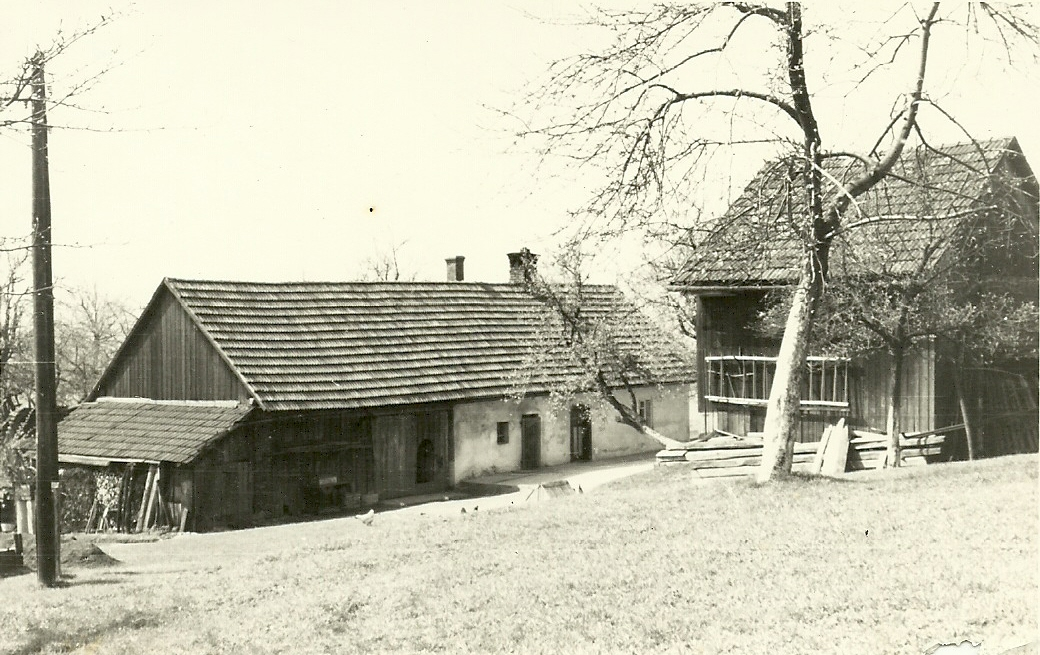
House No. 36 in the 1950s

The first written mention of Vělopolí is from 1448. Politically it belonged then to the Duchy of Teschen.

After revolutions of 1848 in the Austrian Empire, a modern municipal division was introduced in the re-established Austrian Silesia. The village as a municipality was subscribed to the political and legal district of Cieszyn. According to the censuses conducted in 1880–1910, the population of the municipality dropped from 327 in 1880 to 306 in 1910 with all the inhabitants being native Polish-speakers. In terms of religion in 1910 the majority were Protestants (88.2%), followed by Roman Catholics (11.8%).

After World War I, Polish–Czechoslovak War and the division of Cieszyn Silesia in 1920, Vělopolí became a part of Czechoslovakia. Following the Munich Agreement, in October 1938 together with the Trans-Olza region it was annexed by Poland, administratively adjoined to Cieszyn County of Silesian Voivodeship. It was then annexed by Nazi Germany at the beginning of World War II. After the war it was restored to Czechoslovakia.

== Demographics ==
According to the 2021 Census, Polish minority makes up 20.1% of the population.

Historical population

Year	Pop.	±%
1869	373	—
1880	327	−12.3%
1890	306	−6.4%
1900	295	−3.6%
1910	306	+3.7%

Year	Pop.	±%
1921	335	+9.5%
1930	336	+0.3%
1950	282	−16.1%
1961	264	−6.4%
1970	248	−6.1%

Year	Pop.	±%
1980	247	−0.4%
1991	199	−19.4%
2001	206	+3.5%
2011	281	+36.4%
2021	294	+4.6%

Source: Censuses

== Sights ==
Among the protected cultural monuments are a homestead from 1887 and a set of statues from the first half of the 19th century, which were originally in the park of the Hnojník Castle.
