= Lhotka (Frýdek-Místek District) =

- Municipality
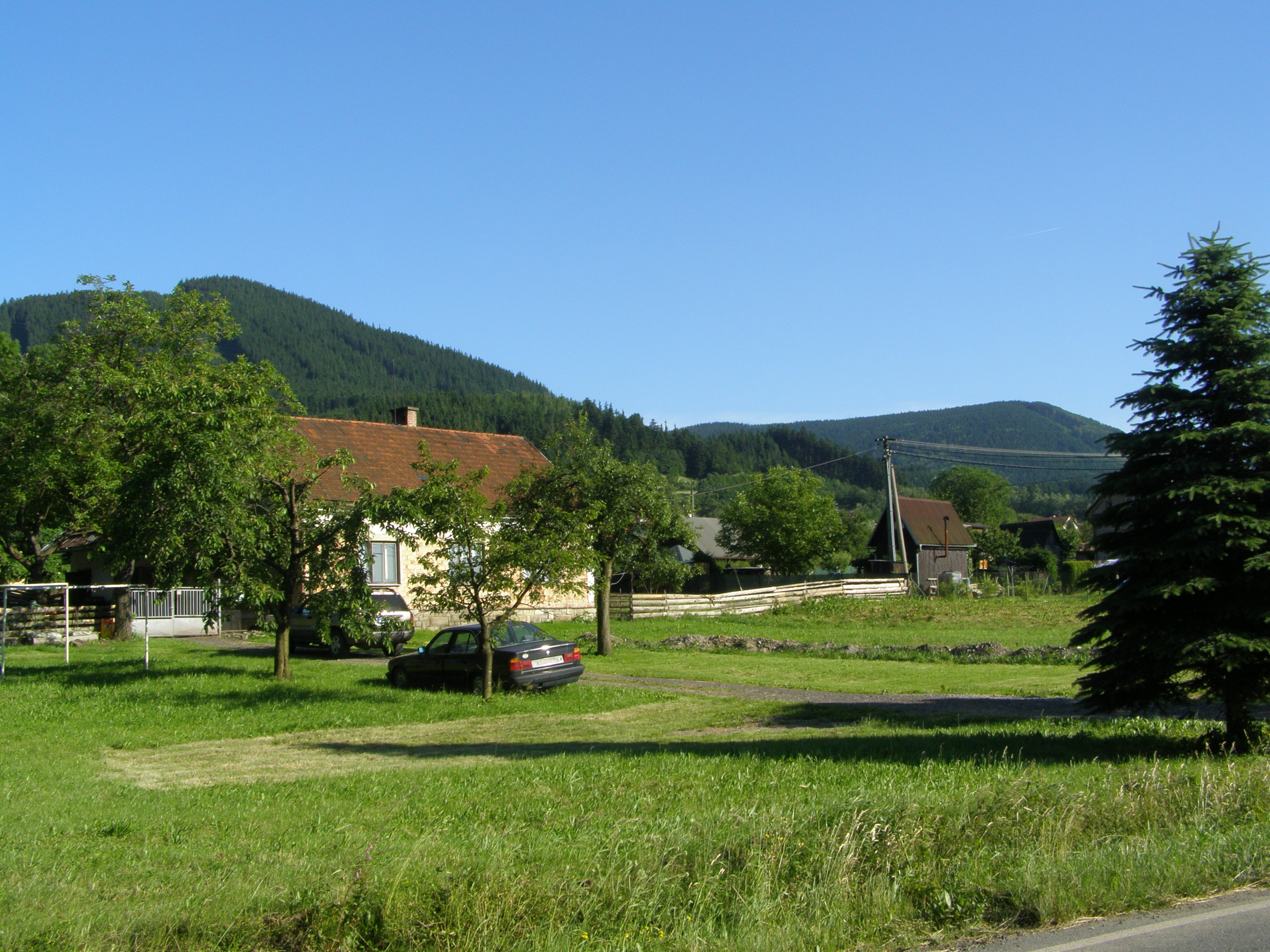
- Lhotka with Ondřejník hill in the background

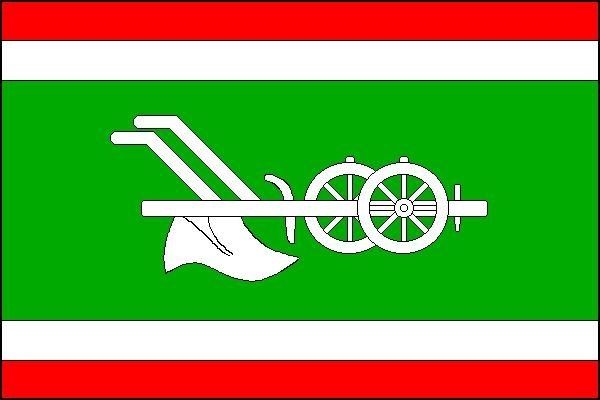
- Flag Coat of arms

- Location in the Czech Republic
- Coordinates: 49°35′50″N 18°17′54″E
- Country: Czech Republic
- Region: Moravian-Silesian
- District: Frýdek-Místek
- First mentioned: 1359

Area
  - Total: 7.21 km^{2} (2.78 sq mi)
- Elevation: 433 m (1,421 ft)

Population (2026-01-01)
  - Total: 602
  - Density: 83.5/km^{2} (216/sq mi)
- Time zone: UTC+1 (CET)
  - Summer (DST): UTC+2 (CEST)
- Postal code: 739 47
- Website: www.obec-lhotka.eu

Lhotka is a municipality and village in Frýdek-Místek District in the Moravian-Silesian Region of the Czech Republic. It has about 600 inhabitants.

== Demographics ==
Historical population
Year	Pop.	±%
1869	464	—
1880	475	+2.4%
1890	477	+0.4%
1900	547	+14.7%
1910	551	+0.7%
1921	521	−5.4%
1930	559	+7.3%
1950	515	−7.9%
1961	553	+7.4%
1970	520	−6.0%
1980	461	−11.3%
1991	415	−10.0%
2001	432	+4.1%
2011	501	+16.0%
2021	543	+8.4%
Source: Censuses
