= Krásná (Frýdek-Místek District) =

- Municipality
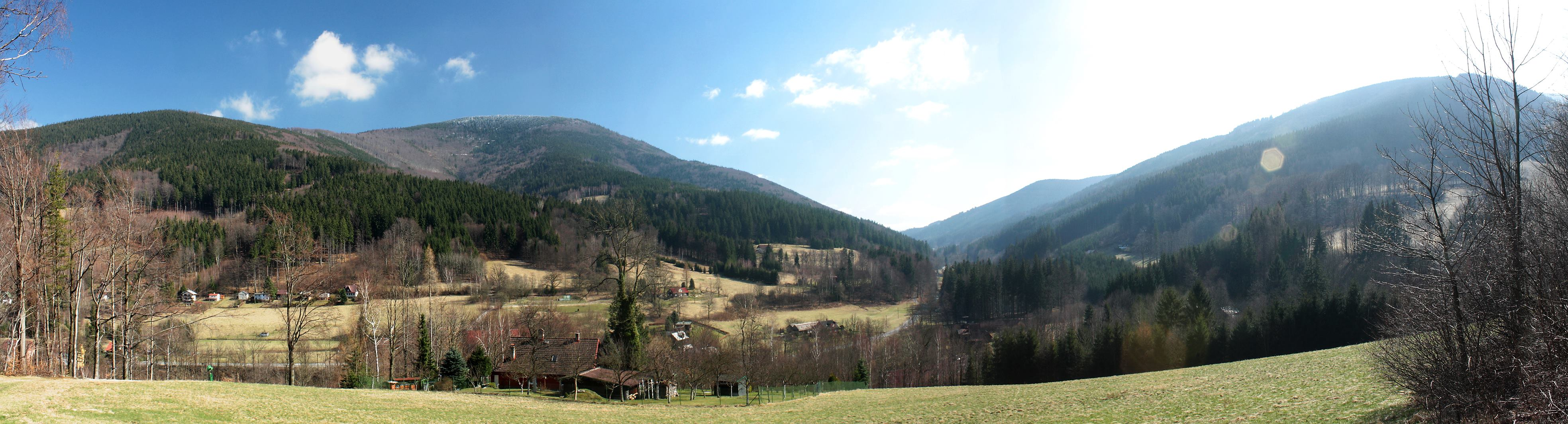
- View towards the village

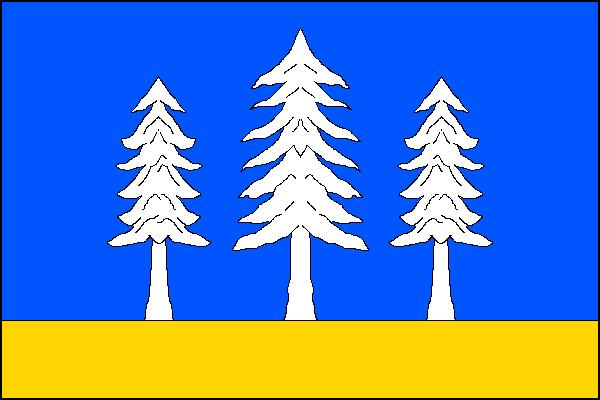
- Flag Coat of arms

- Location in the Czech Republic
- Coordinates: 49°34′52″N 18°28′37″E
- Country: Czech Republic
- Region: Moravian-Silesian
- District: Frýdek-Místek
- First mentioned: 1639

Area
  - Total: 44.08 km^{2} (17.02 sq mi)
- Elevation: 520 m (1,710 ft)

Population (2026-01-01)
  - Total: 697
  - Density: 15.8/km^{2} (41.0/sq mi)
- Time zone: UTC+1 (CET)
  - Summer (DST): UTC+2 (CEST)
- Postal code: 739 04
- Website: www.obec-krasna.cz

Krásná (German: Krasna, Polish: Krasna) is a municipality and village in Frýdek-Místek District in the Moravian-Silesian Region of the Czech Republic. It has about 700 inhabitants.

== Etymology ==
In Czech, the name literally means 'nice'. However, the name is derived from the old Slavic word krast (in modern Czech chrást), which is a designation for leaves from vegetables, beets and similar plants.

== Geography ==
Krásná is located about 14 kilometres (9 mi) southeast of Frýdek-Místek and 28 km (17 mi) southeast of Ostrava, in the historical region of Cieszyn Silesia. It lies in the Moravian-Silesian Beskids. The summit of Lysá hora, which is the highest mountain of this range with an elevation of 1,323 metres (4,341 ft), is located on the western border of the municipal territory. The village is situated in the valley of the Mohelnice River.

== History ==
The first written mention of Krásná is from 1639, when it belonged to the Frýdek estate. It was founded between 1636 and 1639.

== Demographics ==
Historical population

Year	Pop.	±%
1869	1,757	—
1880	1,882	+7.1%
1890	1,805	−4.1%
1900	1,622	−10.1%
1910	1,500	−7.5%

Year	Pop.	±%
1921	1,416	−5.6%
1930	1,546	+9.2%
1950	1,292	−16.4%
1961	1,275	−1.3%
1970	1,055	−17.3%

Year	Pop.	±%
1980	803	−23.9%
1991	631	−21.4%
2001	634	+0.5%
2011	637	+0.5%
2021	648	+1.7%

Source: Censuses

== Transport ==
There are no railways or major roads passing through the municipality.

== Sights ==
The only protected cultural monument is the homestead No. 10 from the end of the 18th century.

== Twin towns – sister cities ==
Krásná is twinned with:

- Bziny, Slovakia
- Wilkowice, Poland
