= Pržno (Frýdek-Místek District) =

- Municipality
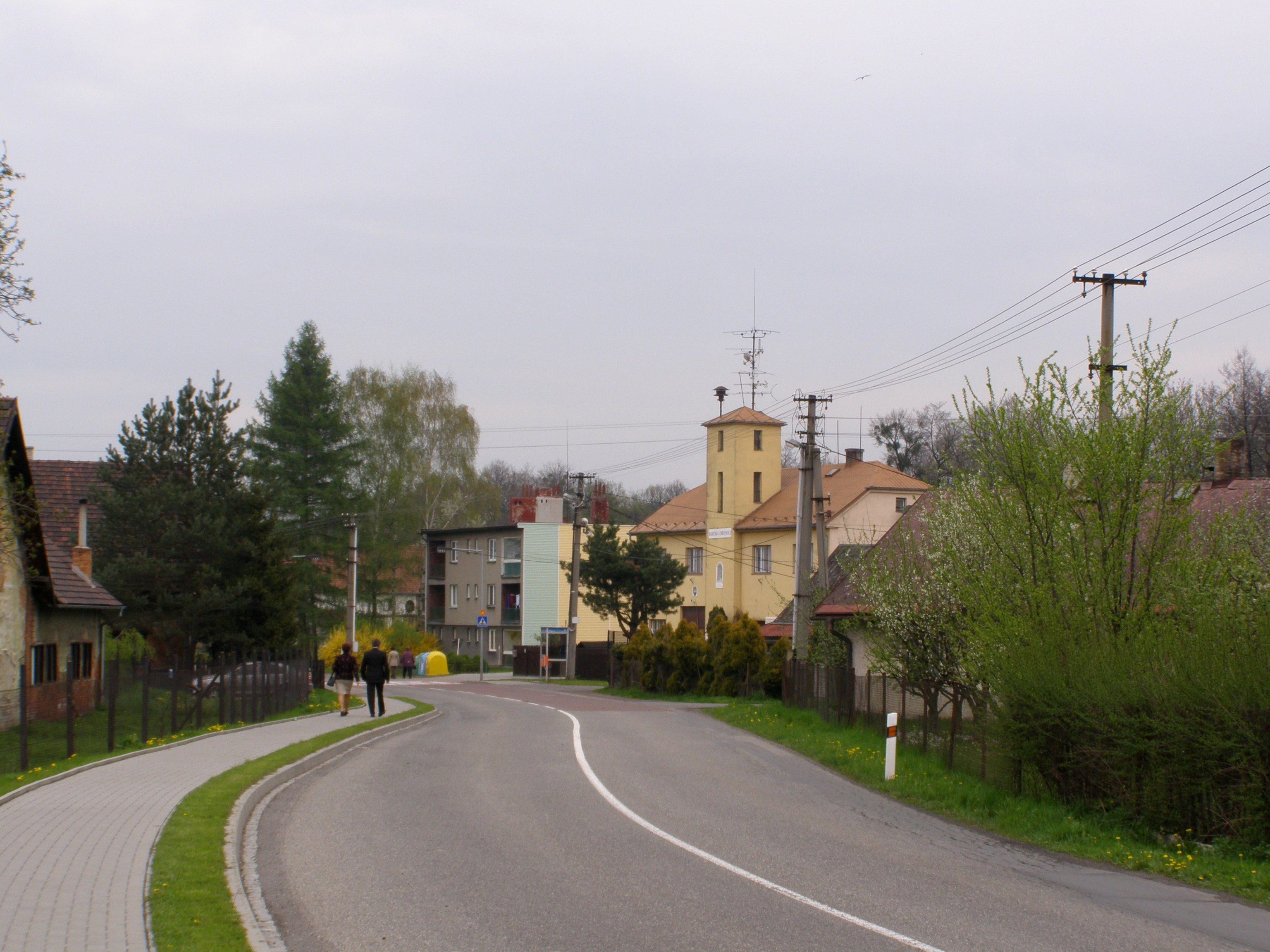
- Firehouse by the main road

- Flag Coat of arms

- Location in the Czech Republic
- Coordinates: 49°36′48″N 18°21′42″E
- Country: Czech Republic
- Region: Moravian-Silesian
- District: Frýdek-Místek
- First mentioned: 1573

Area
  - Total: 2.94 km^{2} (1.14 sq mi)
- Elevation: 340 m (1,120 ft)

Population (2026-01-01)
  - Total: 1,098
  - Density: 373/km^{2} (967/sq mi)
- Time zone: UTC+1 (CET)
  - Summer (DST): UTC+2 (CEST)
- Postal code: 739 11
- Website: www.przno.cz

Pržno is a municipality and village in Frýdek-Místek District in the Moravian-Silesian Region of the Czech Republic. It has about 1,100 inhabitants.

== Geography ==
Pržno is located about 6 kilometres (4 mi) south of Frýdek-Místek and 21 km (13 mi) south of Ostrava, in the historical region of Cieszyn Silesia. It lies in the Moravian-Silesian Foothills. The highest point is at 407 m (1,335 ft) above sea level. The municipality is situated on the right bank of the Ostravice River.

== History ==
The first written mention of Pržno is from 1573. It was then a part of the Frýdek state country that was split from the Duchy of Teschen in 1573.

== Demographics ==
Historical population

Year	Pop.	±%
1869	357	—
1880	386	+8.1%
1890	380	−1.6%
1900	439	+15.5%
1910	504	+14.8%

Year	Pop.	±%
1921	536	+6.3%
1930	649	+21.1%
1950	643	−0.9%
1961	712	+10.7%
1970	648	−9.0%

Year	Pop.	±%
1980	651	+0.5%
1991	661	+1.5%
2001	750	+13.5%
2011	991	+32.1%
2021	1,082	+9.2%

Source: Censuses

== Transport ==
The I/56 road (which connects Frýdek-Místek with the I/35 road near the Czech–Slovak border) runs along the western municipal border just outside the municipality.

Pržno is located on the railway line Ostrava–Frýdlant nad Ostravicí.

== Sights ==
There are no protected cultural monuments in the municipality. The main landmark is the Church of the Immaculate Conception of the Virgin Mary. It was built in the Neo-Romanesque style in 1909–1910.
