= Písečná (Frýdek-Místek District) =

Písečná Pioseczna
- Municipality
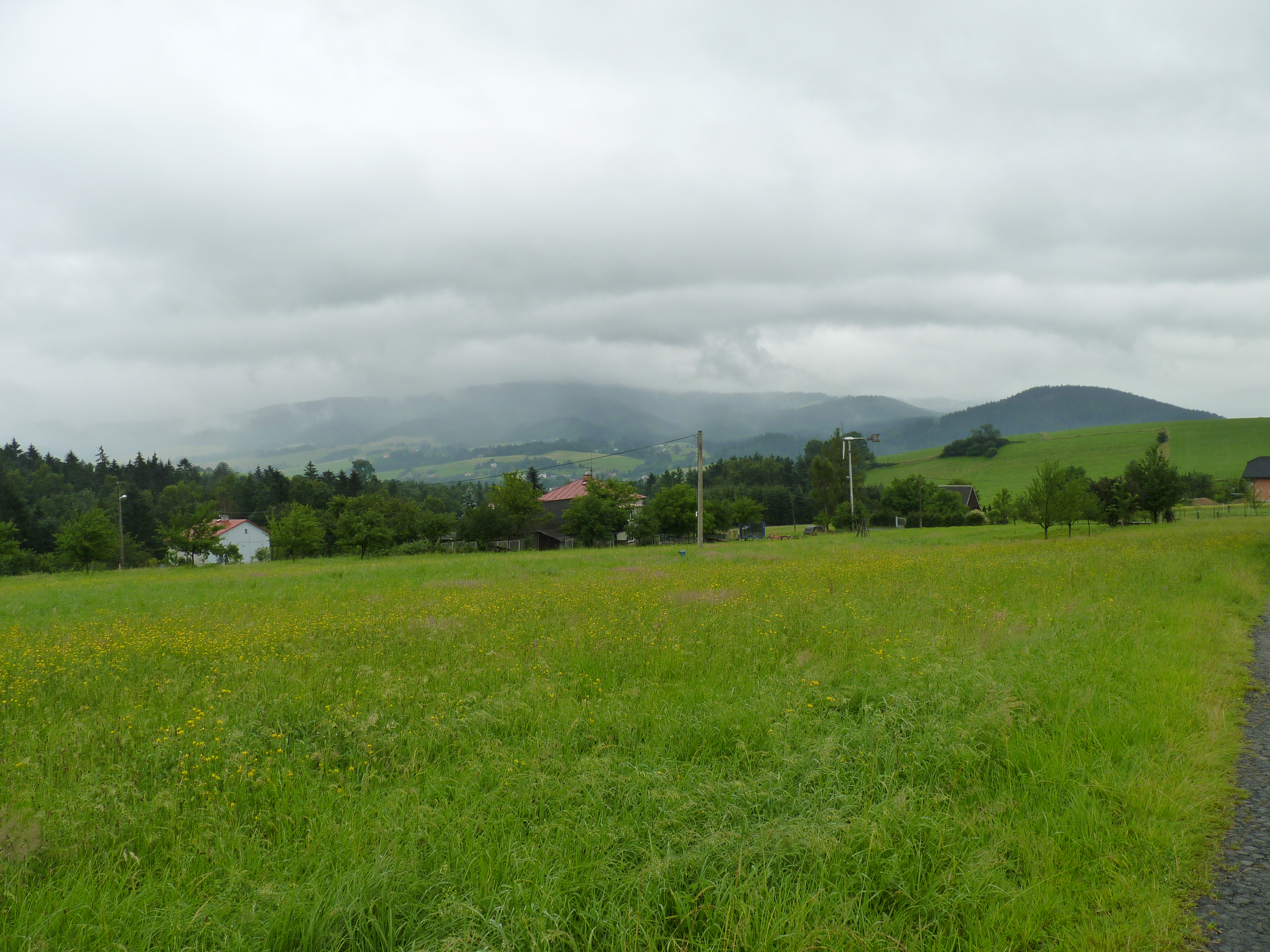
- Landscape in Písečná

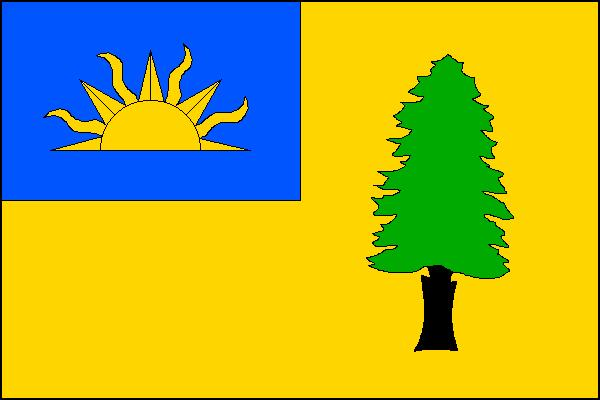
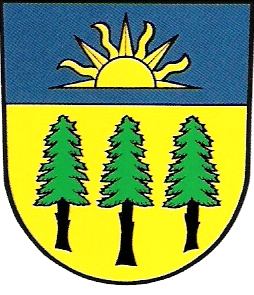
- Flag Coat of arms

- Location in the Czech Republic
- Coordinates: 49°34′29″N 18°47′15″E
- Country: Czech Republic
- Region: Moravian-Silesian
- District: Frýdek-Místek
- First mentioned: 1446

Area
  - Total: 2.36 km^{2} (0.91 sq mi)
- Elevation: 493 m (1,617 ft)

Population (2026-01-01)
  - Total: 1,067
  - Density: 452/km^{2} (1,170/sq mi)
- Time zone: UTC+1 (CET)
  - Summer (DST): UTC+2 (CEST)
- Postal code: 739 91
- Website: www.obecpisecna.cz

Písečná (Czech pronunciation: [ˈpiːsɛtʃnaː]; Polish: Pioseczna) is a municipality and village in Frýdek-Místek District in the Moravian-Silesian Region of the Czech Republic. It has about 1,100 inhabitants. The municipality has a significant Polish minority.

== Geography ==
Písečná is located about 33 kilometres (21 mi) east of Frýdek-Místek and 43 km (27 mi) southeast of Ostrava. It lies in the historical region of Cieszyn Silesia. The western part of the municipality lies in the Jablukov Furrow and the eastern part lies in the Silesian Beskids mountain range. The highest point is at 675 m (2,215 ft) above sea level.

== History ==
The first written mention of Písečná is from 1446. Until 2000, it was a municipal part of Jablunkov.

== Demographics ==
According to the 2021 Census, Polish minority makes up 16.3% of the population.

Historical population

Year	Pop.	±%
1869	367	—
1880	383	+4.4%
1890	446	+16.4%
1900	453	+1.6%
1910	523	+15.5%

Year	Pop.	±%
1921	490	−6.3%
1930	593	+21.0%
1950	608	+2.5%
1961	820	+34.9%
1970	741	−9.6%

Year	Pop.	±%
1980	806	+8.8%
1991	991	+23.0%
2001	804	−18.9%
2011	899	+11.8%
2021	982	+9.2%

Source: Censuses

== Transport ==
There are no railways or major roads passing through the municipality.

== Sights ==
There are no protected cultural monuments in the municipality.
