= Žabeň =

- Municipality
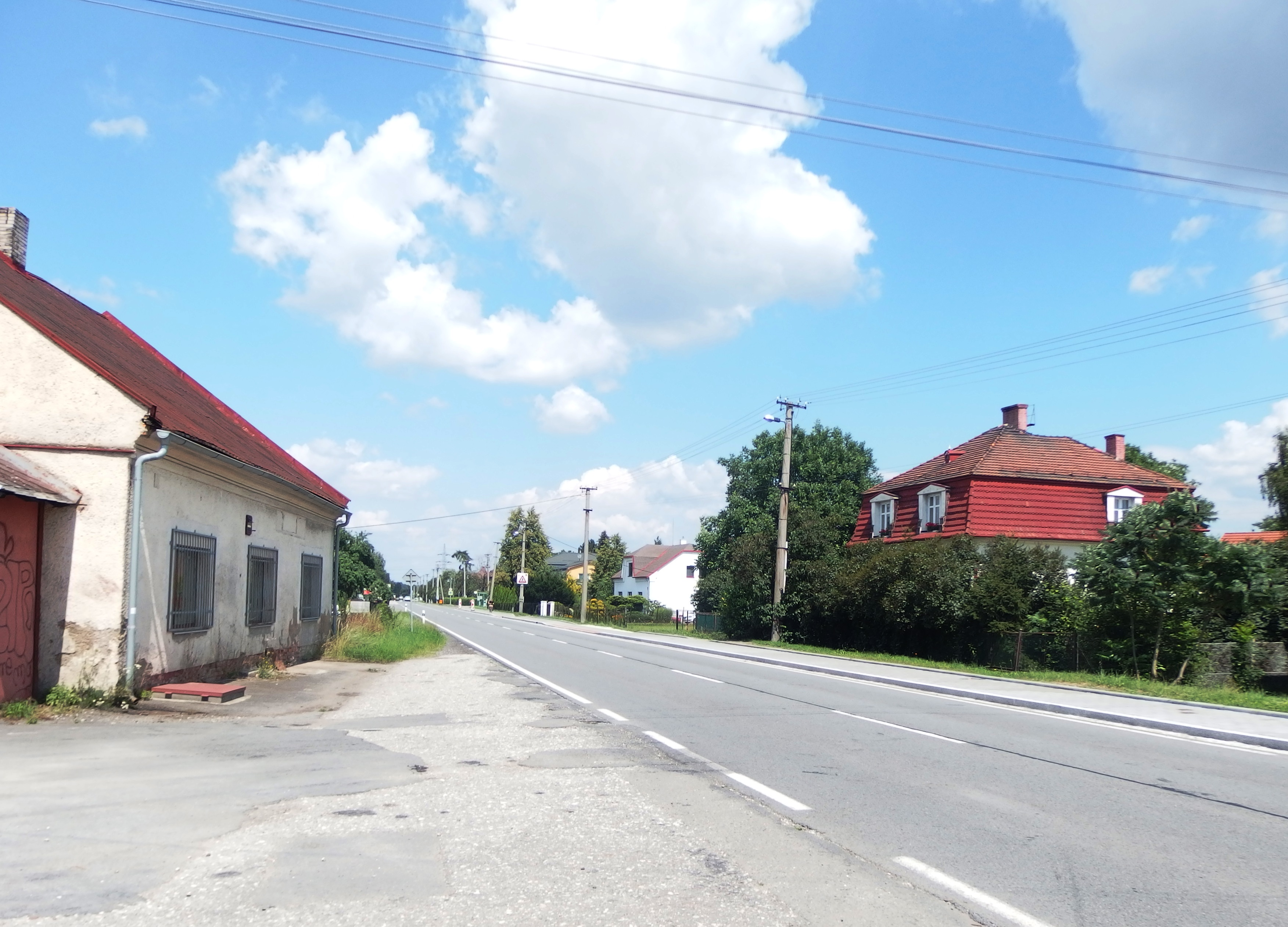
- Main street

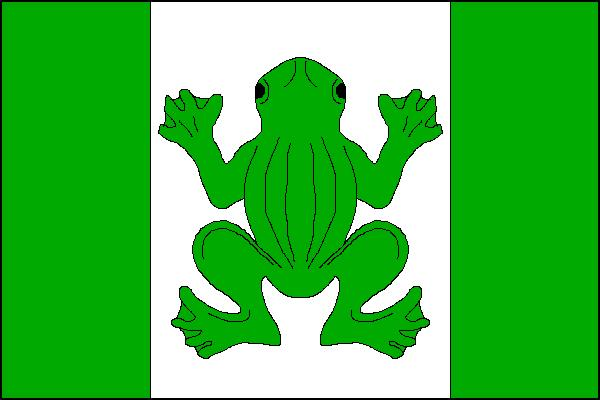
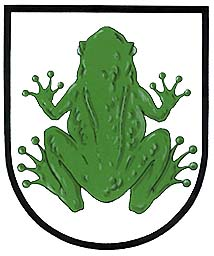
- Flag Coat of arms

- Location in the Czech Republic
- Coordinates: 49°42′32″N 18°18′15″E
- Country: Czech Republic
- Region: Moravian-Silesian
- District: Frýdek-Místek
- First mentioned: 1460

Area
  - Total: 3.36 km^{2} (1.30 sq mi)
- Elevation: 266 m (873 ft)

Population (2026-01-01)
  - Total: 981
  - Density: 292/km^{2} (756/sq mi)
- Time zone: UTC+1 (CET)
  - Summer (DST): UTC+2 (CEST)
- Postal code: 739 25
- Website: www.zaben.cz

Žabeň is a municipality and village in Frýdek-Místek District in the Moravian-Silesian Region of the Czech Republic. It has about 1,000 inhabitants.

== Etymology ==
The name is derived from the Czech word žába, which means 'frog'. It refers to their large population in the ponds and wetlands that used to be here.

== History ==
The first written mention of Žabeň is from 1460.

== Demographics ==
Historical population
Year	Pop.	±%
1869	379	—
1880	364	−4.0%
1890	404	+11.0%
1900	456	+12.9%
1910	518	+13.6%
1921	453	−12.5%
1930	523	+15.5%
1950	519	−0.8%
1961	653	+25.8%
1970	667	+2.1%
1980	681	+2.1%
1991	603	−11.5%
2001	607	+0.7%
2011	680	+12.0%
2021	899	+32.2%
Source: Censuses
