= D56 motorway =

Czech motorway

D56 Motorway
- Dálnice D56

Route information
- Length: 13 km (8.1 mi)

Major junctions
- From: D 1 in Ostrava
- To: D 48 near Frýdek-Místek

Location
- Country: Czech Republic
- Regions: Moravian-Silesian
- Major cities: Ostrava, Frýdek-Místek

Highway system
- Highways in the Czech Republic
← D 55

D56 motorway (Czech: Dálnice D56), formerly Expressway R56 (Czech: Rychlostní silnice R56) is a highway in eastern Czech Republic. The D56 motorway is a fully completed motorway leading from Ostrava to Frýdek-Místek. This four-lane road is 13 kilometres (8.1 mi) long, making it the shortest motorway in the Czech motorway network.

== Chronology ==
The last 2.2 kilometres (1.4 mi) long section connecting the D56 motorway with the D48 motorway was opened on 30 June 2022.
