= Silesian Evangelical Church of the Augsburg Confession =

Lutheran church in the Czech Republic

Luther Rose

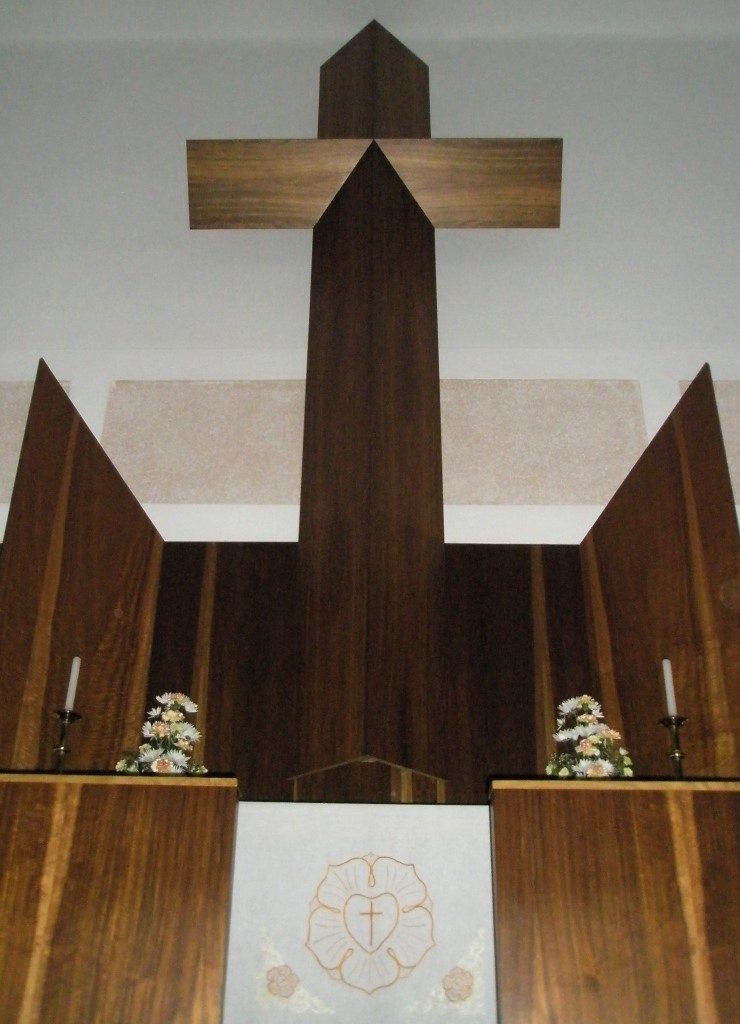
Altar of the Silesian Evangelical Church of Augsburg Confession church in Třanovice.

The Silesian Evangelical Church of the Augsburg Confession (SECAC) (Czech: Slezská církev evangelická augsburského vyznání (SCEAV), Polish: Śląski Kościół Ewangelicki Wyznania Augsburskiego) is the biggest Lutheran Church in the Czech Republic besides the Evangelical Church of Czech Bretheren which is united Lutheran and Reformed. Its congregations are located mainly in the Czech part of Cieszyn Silesia. A significant number of the followers belong to the Polish ethnic minority. There is a strong heritage of pietism and evangelicalism in the church. In 2009, it reported 15,632 baptized members.

The church in its present form was established after World War I, but its origins can be traced to the 16th century. Lutheranism started to spread over Cieszyn Silesia during Luther’s lifetime. From 1610 it was subject to counter-reformation. In 1709 a church in Cieszyn was given to the Lutherans by Emperor Joseph I and this church became a significant centre of pietism and played an important role in the establishment of the Moravian Church. The revivalist movement was also strongly present in Cieszyn Silesia at the beginning of the 20th century, culminating in 1905. The spiritual leader of the church during its persecution under the Communist regime in Czechoslovakia was pastor Władysław Santarius.

SECAC is a member of the World Council of Churches, the Conference of European Churches, and the Lutheran World Federation. In 2006 SECAC established a formal partnership with the Southeastern Pennsylvania Synod; this partnership was terminated in 2009 due to changes in the moral policy of the Evangelical Lutheran Church in America. SECAC cooperates with the Association of Free Lutheran Congregations and the Lutheran Church–Missouri Synod.

The current bishop is Tomáš Tyrlík.

== See also ==
- Stanislav Piętak
- Johann Adam Steinmetz
- Władysław Santarius
- Jiří Třanovský
