= Władysław Santarius =

- Born: 12 November 1915; Stonava, Austrian Silesia
- Died: 5 June 1989 (aged 73); Havířov, Czechoslovakia
- Citizenship: Czechoslovak
- Occupation: Lutheran pastor

Władysław Santarius (also known as Vladislav Santarius) (12 November 1915 in Stonava, Austrian Silesia – 5 June 1989 in Havířov, Czechoslovakia) was a Polish Lutheran Evangelical pastor, one of the most significant Christian leaders in Czechoslovakia during the Communist era. He was leader of revivalist movement in Cieszyn Silesia and because of it he was persecuted (but never jailed).

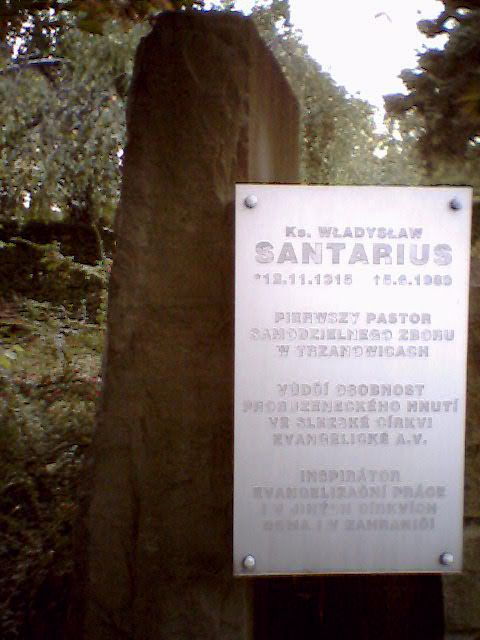
Detail of Santarius memorial in Třanovice.

== See also ==
- Silesian Evangelical Church of Augsburg Confession

== Bibliography ==
- Lord, You Have Called… Vladislav Santarius – God’s Work Through His Life And Ministry. Český Těšín: 2004.
- Martin Piętak: Faith, Ethnicity and Social Issues in the Thoughts and Work of Pastor Vladislav Santarius. Journal of Lutheran Mission, 2015 (2), No. 5, pp. 52–61.
