= Řeka =

Řeka Rzeka
- Municipality
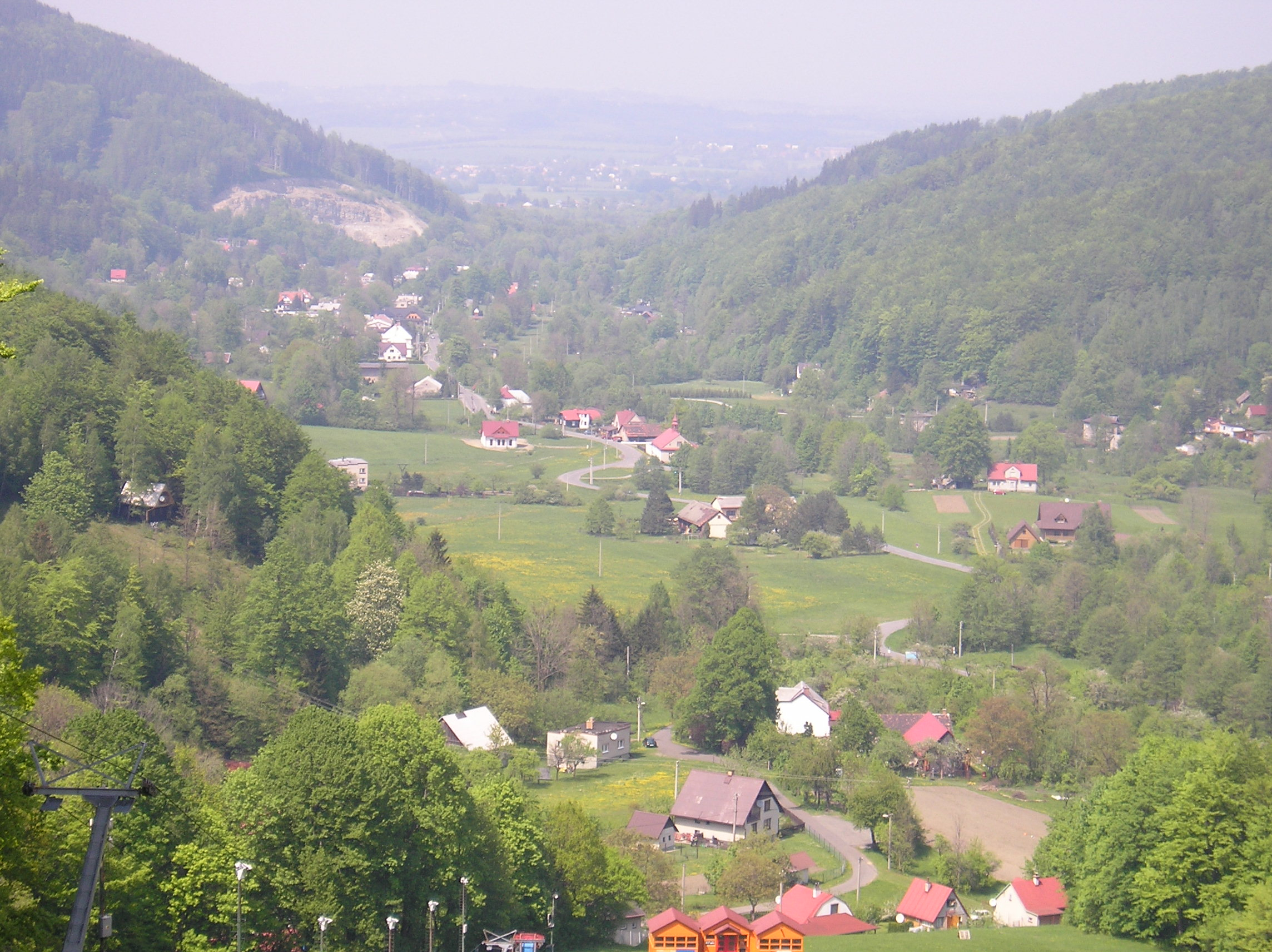
- General view of Řeka

- Flag Coat of arms

- Location in the Czech Republic
- Coordinates: 49°38′28″N 18°34′17″E
- Country: Czech Republic
- Region: Moravian-Silesian
- District: Frýdek-Místek
- Founded: 1644

Area
  - Total: 13.45 km^{2} (5.19 sq mi)
- Elevation: 420 m (1,380 ft)

Population (2026-01-01)
  - Total: 548
  - Density: 40.7/km^{2} (106/sq mi)
- Time zone: UTC+1 (CET)
  - Summer (DST): UTC+2 (CEST)
- Postal code: 739 55
- Website: www.obecreka.cz

Řeka (Czech pronunciation: [ˈr̝ɛka]; Polish: Rzeka) is a municipality and village in Frýdek-Místek District in the Moravian-Silesian Region of the Czech Republic. It has about 500 inhabitants. The municipality has a significant Polish minority.

== Etymology ==
In Czech, the name literally means 'river'.

== Geography ==
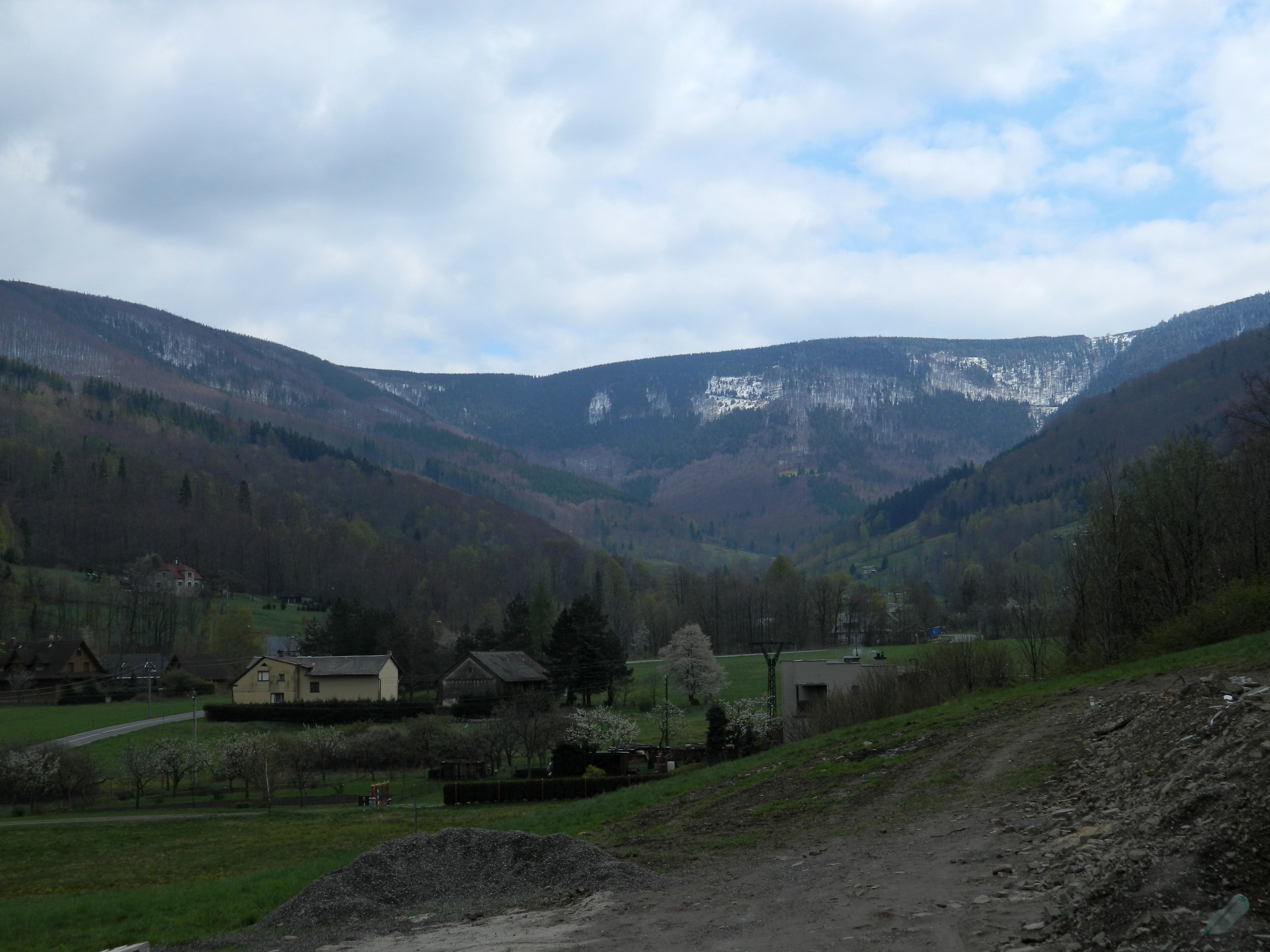
View of Šindelná from Řeka

Řeka is located about 15 kilometres (9 mi) east of Frýdek-Místek and 27 km (17 mi) southeast of Ostrava. It lies in the historical region of Cieszyn Silesia in the Moravian-Silesian Beskids mountain range. The highest point is the Šindelná mountain at 1,100 m (3,600 ft) above sea level, located on the southeastern municipal border. The Ropičanka Stream originates in the municipal territory and then flows across the municipality.

== History ==
Řeka was founded in 1644 was formed by the separation from Smilovice and Guty, and originally named Řeka smilovská. It belonged then to the Duchy of Teschen. The village was established as a typical mountain settlement by associating already existing scattered mountain pastures and mountain farms. In the following years, other small farmers settled in the newly formed village. The main source of livelihood of the inhabitants was mountain farming.

After revolutions of 1848 in the Austrian Empire, a modern municipal division was introduced in the re-established Austrian Silesia. The village as a municipality was subscribed to the political and legal district of Cieszyn. According to the censuses conducted in 1880–1910, the majority were native Polish-speakers (between 95.5% and 99.6%) accompanied by a small German-speaking minority (at most 19 or 4.1% in 1890) and Czech-speaking people (growing from one in 1880 to ten in 1910). In terms of religion in 1910 the majority were Protestants (92.6%), followed by Roman Catholics (6.8%) and 3 people adhering to another faiths (but not Jewish).

After World War I, Polish–Czechoslovak War and the division of Cieszyn Silesia in 1920, it became a part of Czechoslovakia. Following the Munich Agreement, in October 1938 together with the Trans-Olza region it was annexed by Poland, administratively adjoined to Cieszyn County of Silesian Voivodeship. It was then annexed by Nazi Germany at the beginning of World War II. After the war it was restored to Czechoslovakia.

== Demographics ==
According to the 2021 Census, Polish minority makes up 10.1% of the population.

Historical population

Year	Pop.	±%
1869	553	—
1880	524	−5.2%
1890	476	−9.2%
1900	488	+2.5%
1910	515	+5.5%

Year	Pop.	±%
1921	454	−11.8%
1930	449	−1.1%
1950	433	−3.6%
1961	497	+14.8%
1970	529	+6.4%

Year	Pop.	±%
1980	496	−6.2%
1991	450	−9.3%
2001	466	+3.6%
2011	495	+6.2%
2021	543	+9.7%

Source: Censuses

== Transport ==
There are no railways or major roads passing through the municipality.

== Sport ==
There is a small ski resort in the municipality.

== Sights ==
The only protected cultural monument in Řeka is a wooden folk house from the mid-19th century.
