= Smilovice (Frýdek-Místek District) =

Smilovice Śmiłowice
- Municipality
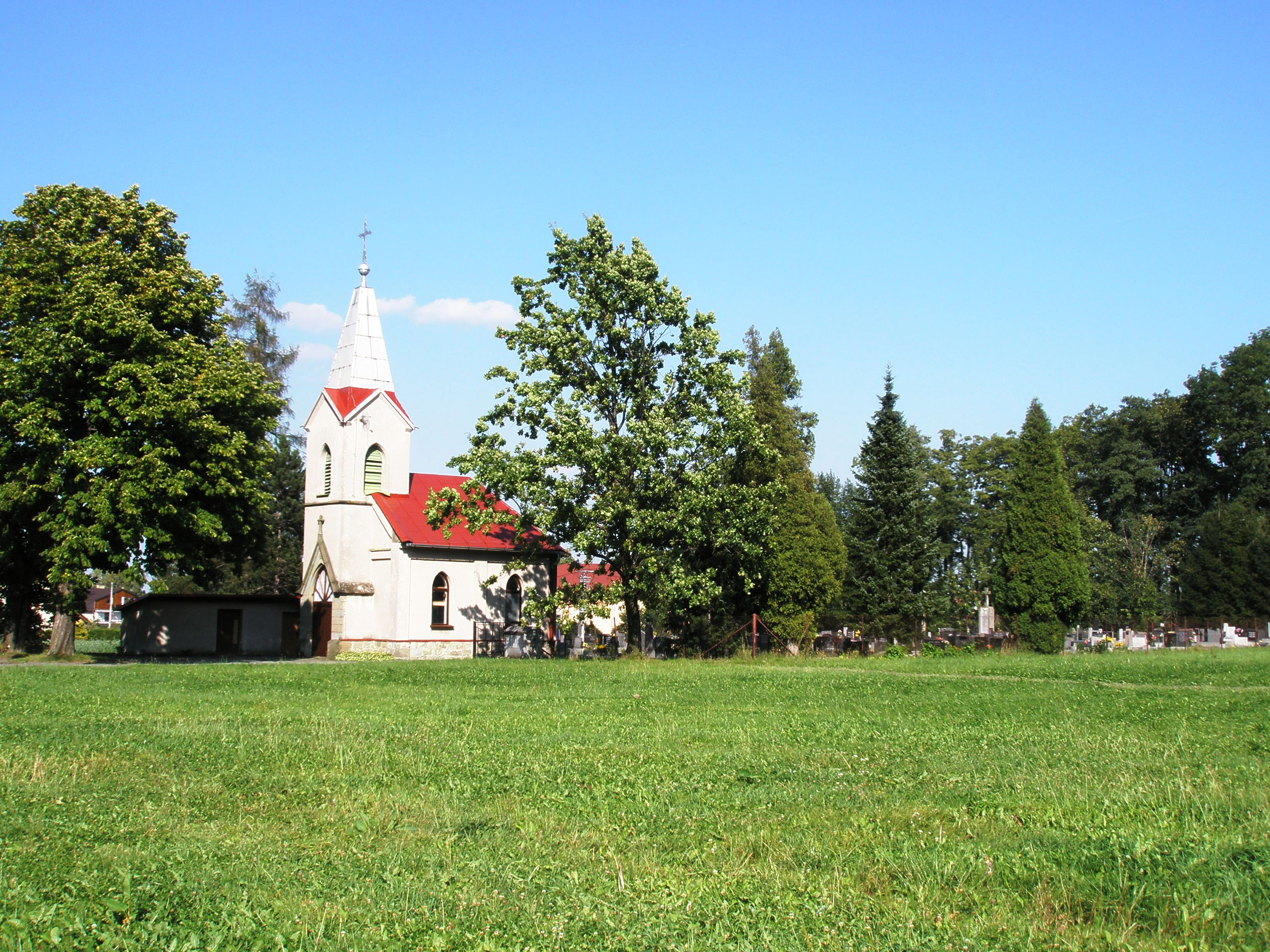
- Lutheran cemetery chapel

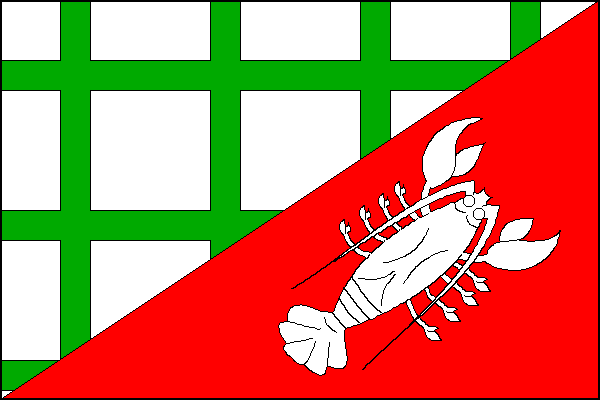
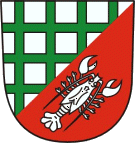
- Flag Coat of arms

- Location in the Czech Republic
- Coordinates: 49°39′39″N 18°34′18″E
- Country: Czech Republic
- Region: Moravian-Silesian
- District: Frýdek-Místek
- First mentioned: 1448

Area
  - Total: 7.85 km^{2} (3.03 sq mi)
- Elevation: 390 m (1,280 ft)

Population (2026-01-01)
  - Total: 874
  - Density: 111/km^{2} (288/sq mi)
- Time zone: UTC+1 (CET)
  - Summer (DST): UTC+2 (CEST)
- Postal code: 739 55
- Website: www.smilovice.cz

Smilovice (Czech pronunciation: [ˈsmɪlovɪtsɛ]; Polish: Śmiłowice, German: Smilowitz) is a municipality and village in Frýdek-Místek District in the Moravian-Silesian Region of the Czech Republic. It has about 900 inhabitants. The municipality has a significant Polish minority. Smilovice is known as the birthplace of former Prime Minister of Poland Jerzy Buzek.

== Etymology ==
The village was named after František Smyl, who brought new inhabitants here.

== Geography ==
Smilovice is located about 15 kilometres (9 mi) east of Frýdek-Místek and 25 km (16 mi) southeast of Ostrava, in the historical region of Cieszyn Silesia. It lies mostly in the Moravian-Silesian Foothills, but the southwestern part extends into the Moravian-Silesian Beskids and lies within the Beskydy Protected Landscape Area. The highest point is at 716 m (2,349 ft) above sea level. The Ropičanka Stream flows through the municipality.

== History ==
The first written mention of Smilovice is from 1448. It belonged then to the Duchy of Teschen. František Smyl helped to settle the village and brought mainly Romanian Vlachs. For these services, Smyl was promoted to squire and became mayor of Cieszyn. The settlers subsisted in agriculture, pastoralism, and mountain farming. In 1603, Duke Adam Wenceslaus sold Smilovice to Hanibal of Brno. Then the village often changed owners. In 1644, the territory where the Řeka community was founded separated from Smilovice.

After the Revolutions of 1848 in the Austrian Empire a modern municipal division was introduced in the re-established Austrian Silesia. The village as a municipality was subscribed to the political and legal district of Cieszyn. According to the censuses conducted in 1880–1910, the population of the municipality dropped from 684 in 1880 to 651 in 1910 with a majority being native Polish-speakers (dropping from 99% in 1880 to 96% in 1910) accompanied by a small Czech-speaking minority (at most 15 or 2.3% in 1910) and German-speaking (at most 11 or 1.7% in 1910). In terms of religion in 1910 the majority were Protestants (83.5%), followed by Roman Catholics (14.4%), Jews (nine or 1.4%) and four people adhering to another faith.

After World War I, the Polish–Czechoslovak War and the division of Cieszyn Silesia in 1920, the municipality became a part of Czechoslovakia. Following the Munich Agreement, in October 1938 together with the Trans-Olza region it was annexed by Poland, administratively adjoined to Cieszyn County of Silesian Voivodeship. It was then annexed by Nazi Germany at the beginning of World War II. After the war it was restored to Czechoslovakia.

From 1980 to 1990, Smilovice was a municipal part of Hnojník. Since 1990, it has been an independent municipality.

== Demographics ==
According to the 2021 Census, Polish minority makes up 18.0% of the population.

Historical population

| Year | Pop. | ±% |
|---|---|---|
| 1869 | 733 | — |
| 1880 | 684 | −6.7% |
| 1890 | 645 | −5.7% |
| 1900 | 628 | −2.6% |
| 1910 | 651 | +3.7% |

| Year | Pop. | ±% |
|---|---|---|
| 1921 | 701 | +7.7% |
| 1930 | 792 | +13.0% |
| 1950 | 712 | −10.1% |
| 1961 | 729 | +2.4% |
| 1970 | 681 | −6.6% |

| Year | Pop. | ±% |
|---|---|---|
| 1980 | 644 | −5.4% |
| 1991 | 569 | −11.6% |
| 2001 | 581 | +2.1% |
| 2011 | 714 | +22.9% |
| 2021 | 852 | +19.3% |

Source: Censuses

== Transport ==
There are no railways or major roads passing through the municipality.

== Culture ==
The Christian festival XcamP takes place in Smilovice annually in July since 2001.

== Sights ==
There are no protected cultural monuments in the municipality. A landmark is the Lutheran cemetery chapel.

== Notable people ==
- Karol Grycz-Śmiłowski (1885–1959), Polish Lutheran and Unitarian priest
- Jerzy Buzek (born 1940), Polish politician, Prime Minister of Poland in 1997–2001
- Stanislav Piętak (born 1946), Lutheran bishop
