= Stanislav Piętak =

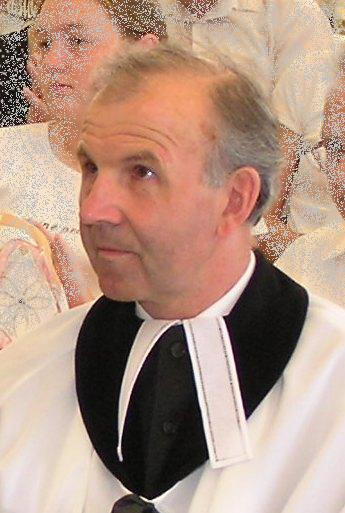
Bishop Piętak

Stanislav Piętak (Polish: Stanisław Piętak) (born 18 March 1946 in Smilovice) is a Czech theologian and pedagogue.

Pietak studied at the Evangelical Theological Faculty of the Comenius University in Bratislava and at the Christian Theological Academy in Warsaw. He received his doctorate from the Comenius University in 2000. He served as pastor in various congregations, e. g. in Třinec. He was chairperson for catechetics at the Pedagogical Faculty of the University of Ostrava (1993–2003)

He served as the bishop of the Silesian Evangelical Church of Augsburg Confession in 2006–2011.

He is one of the contributors of The Lutheran Study Bible.
