= Střítež (Frýdek-Místek District) =

Střítež Trzycież
- Municipality
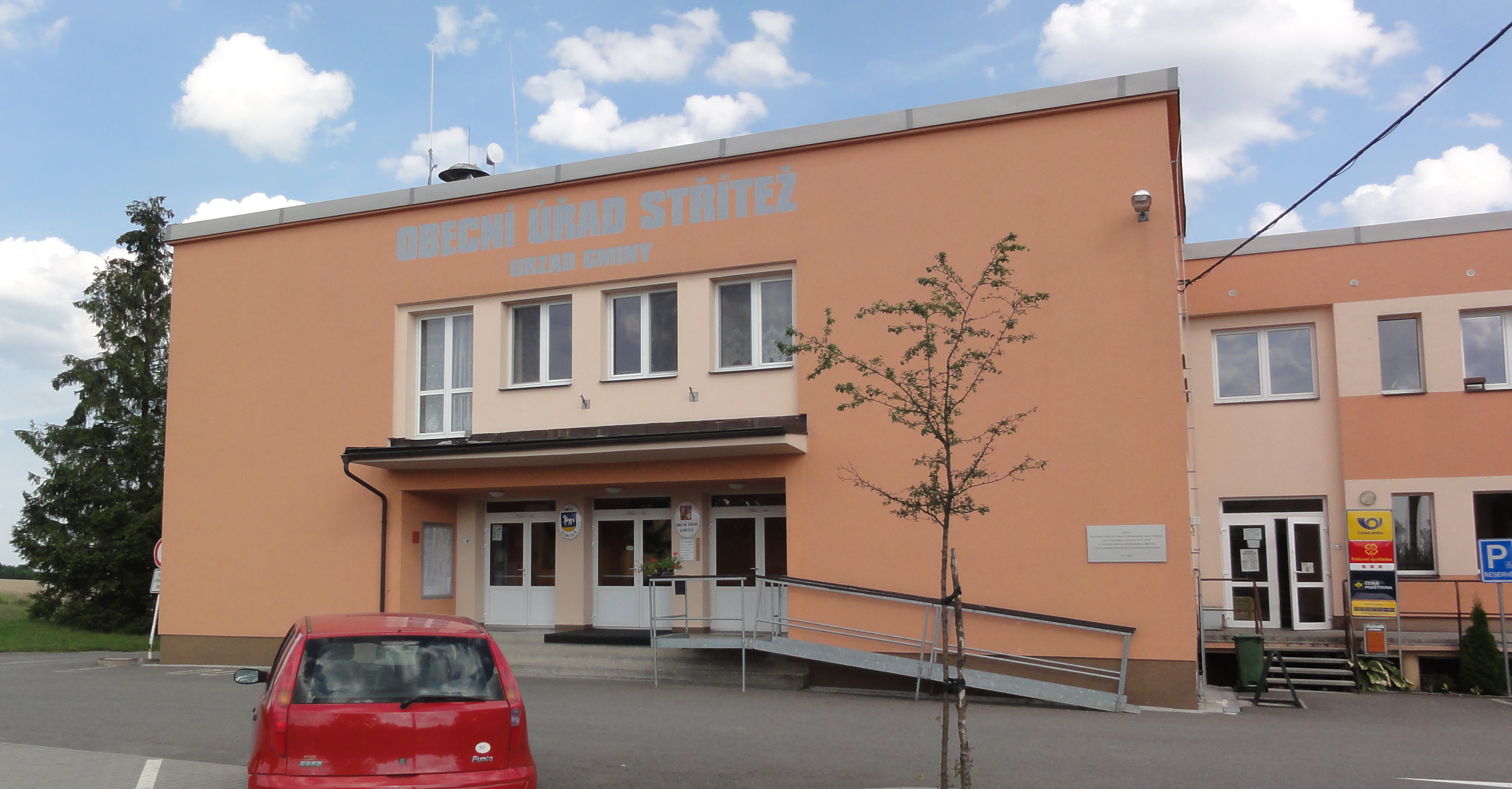
- Municipal office

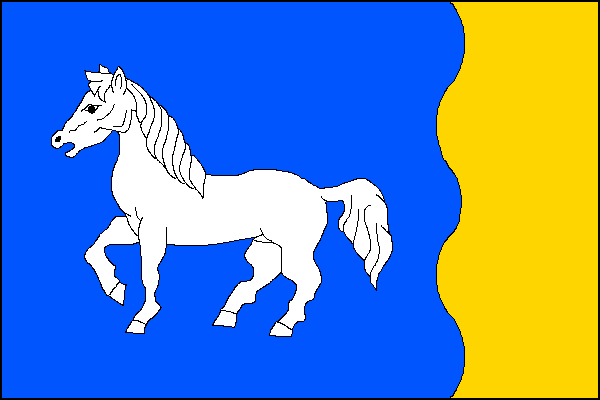
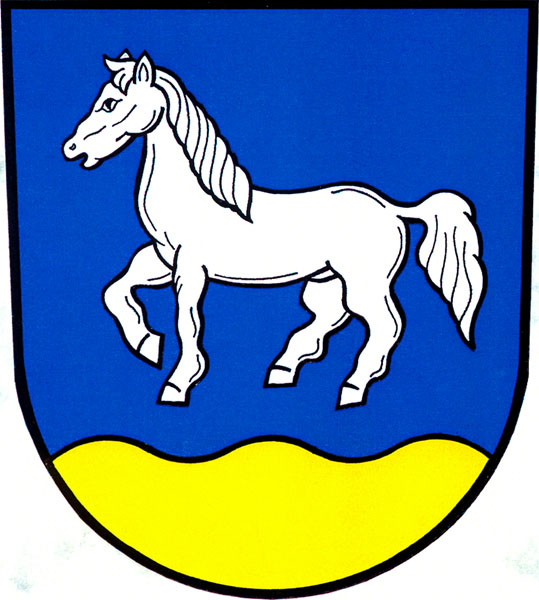
- Flag Coat of arms

- Location in the Czech Republic
- Coordinates: 49°40′45″N 18°34′9″E
- Country: Czech Republic
- Region: Moravian-Silesian
- District: Frýdek-Místek
- First mentioned: 1305

Area
  - Total: 6.15 km^{2} (2.37 sq mi)
- Elevation: 365 m (1,198 ft)

Population (2026-01-01)
  - Total: 1,084
  - Density: 176/km^{2} (457/sq mi)
- Time zone: UTC+1 (CET)
  - Summer (DST): UTC+2 (CEST)
- Postal code: 739 59
- Website: www.obecstritez.cz

Střítež (Czech pronunciation: [ˈstr̝̊iːtɛʒ]; Polish: Trzycież, German: Trzytiesch) is a municipality and village in Frýdek-Místek District in the Moravian-Silesian Region of the Czech Republic. It has about 1,100 inhabitants. The municipality has a significant Polish minority.

== Etymology ==
The origins of the name are dubious. If the original name of the village was Trzeciesz, it could have been derived from personal name Trzeciech. Czech scribing can be related to common local names Střítež denoting damp places vegetated by deergrass. According to A. Bańkowski, the name is derived from Old Polish czrzecież, equivalent to Old Czech form denoting rather 'hack and slash' than reed (Polish: trzcina).

== Geography ==
Střítež is located about 14 kilometres (9 mi) east of Frýdek-Místek and 23 km (14 mi) southeast of Ostrava. It lies in the Moravian-Silesian Foothills, in the historical region of Cieszyn Silesia. The Ropičanka Stream flows through the municipality.

== History ==
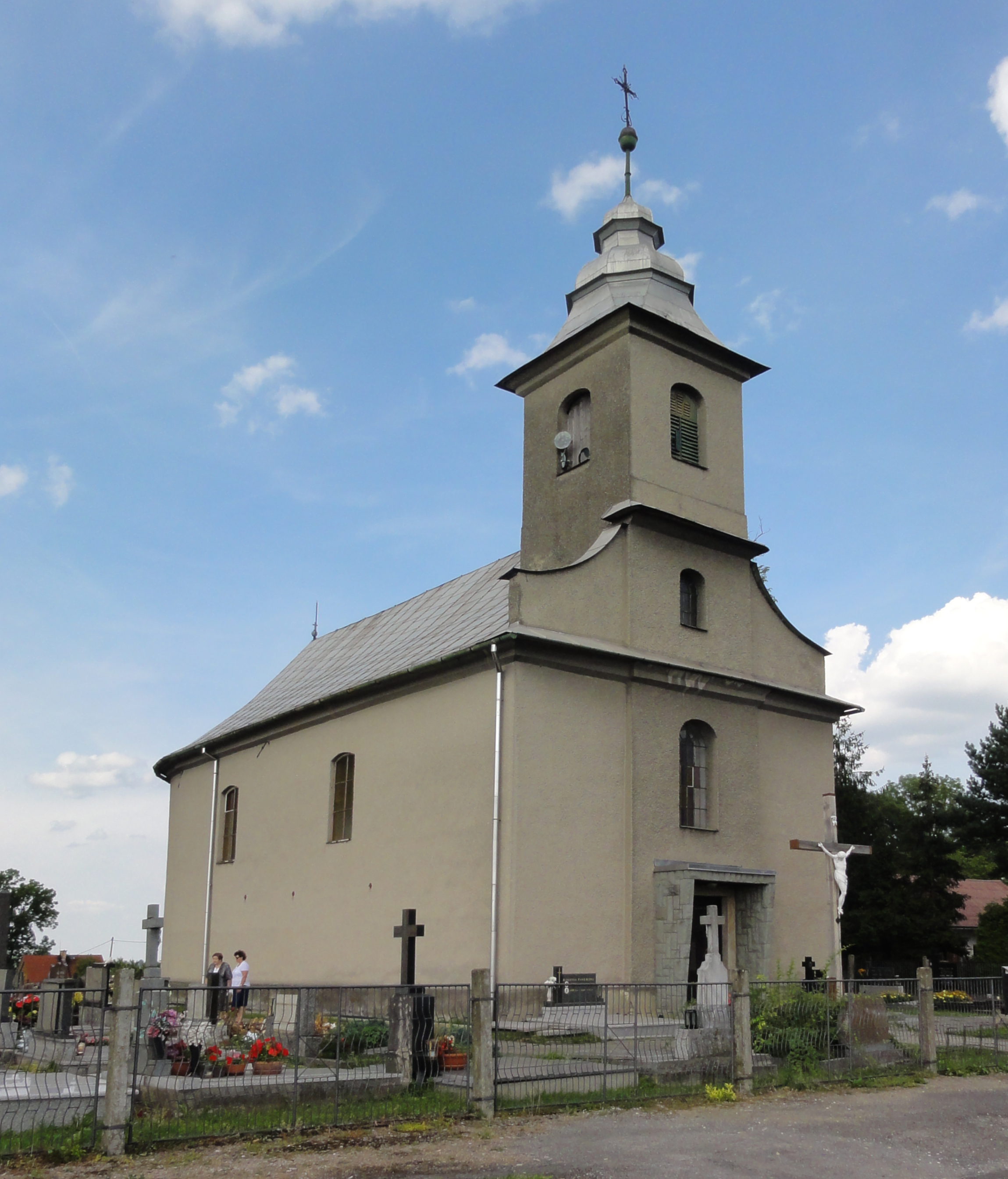
Church of Saint Michael the Archangel

The creation of the village was a part of a larger settlement campaign taking place in the late 13th century on the territory of what will be later known as Upper Silesia. The first written mention of Střítež is in a Latin document of Diocese of Wrocław called Liber fundationis episcopatus Vratislaviensis from around 1305 as Trezhes.

Politically the village belonged initially to the Duchy of Teschen, ruled by a local branch of Piast dynasty. In 1327 the duchy became a fee of Kingdom of Bohemia, which after 1526 became part of the Habsburg monarchy.

Střítež became a seat of a Catholic parish, mentioned in the register of Peter's Pence payment from 1447 among 50 parishes of Teschen deanery as Stzreczicz. After the 1540s Protestant Reformation prevailed in the Duchy of Teschen and a local Catholic church was taken over by Lutherans. It was taken from them (as one from around fifty buildings in the region) by a special commission and given back to the Roman Catholic Church on 23 March 1654.

After Revolutions of 1848 in the Austrian Empire, a modern municipal division was introduced in the re-established Austrian Silesia. The village as a municipality was subscribed to the political and legal district of Cieszyn. According to the censuses conducted in 1880–1910, the population of the municipality grew from 582 in 1880 to 614 in 1910 with a majority being native Polish-speakers (between 92.9% and 96.6%) accompanied by a German-speaking minority (at most 39 or 6.6% in 1900) and Czech-speaking (at most 7 or 1.2% in 1890). In terms of religion in 1910 the majority were Roman Catholics (54.7%), followed by Protestants (43.5%) and Jews (11 or 1.8%).

After World War I, Polish–Czechoslovak War and the division of Cieszyn Silesia in 1920, the municipality became a part of Czechoslovakia. Following the Munich Agreement, in October 1938 together with the Trans-Olza region it was annexed by Poland, administratively adjoined to Cieszyn County of Silesian Voivodeship. It was then annexed by Nazi Germany at the beginning of World War II. After the war it was restored to Czechoslovakia.

== Demographics ==
According to the 2021 Census, Polish minority makes up 14.4% of the population.

Historical population

Year	Pop.	±%
1869	673	—
1880	582	−13.5%
1890	602	+3.4%
1900	594	−1.3%
1910	614	+3.4%

Year	Pop.	±%
1921	615	+0.2%
1930	653	+6.2%
1950	655	+0.3%
1961	787	+20.2%
1970	839	+6.6%

Year	Pop.	±%
1980	911	+8.6%
1991	984	+8.0%
2001	996	+1.2%
2011	981	−1.5%
2021	996	+1.5%

Source: Censuses

== Transport ==
The I/68 road (part of the European route E75), which connects the D48 motorway with the Czech–Slovak border in Mosty u Jablunkova, runs through the municipality.

== Sights ==
The main landmark of Střítež is the Church of Saint Michael the Archangel. It was built in 1806, when it replaced an old wooden church destroyed by a fire.
