= Ropice =

Ropice Ropica
- Municipality
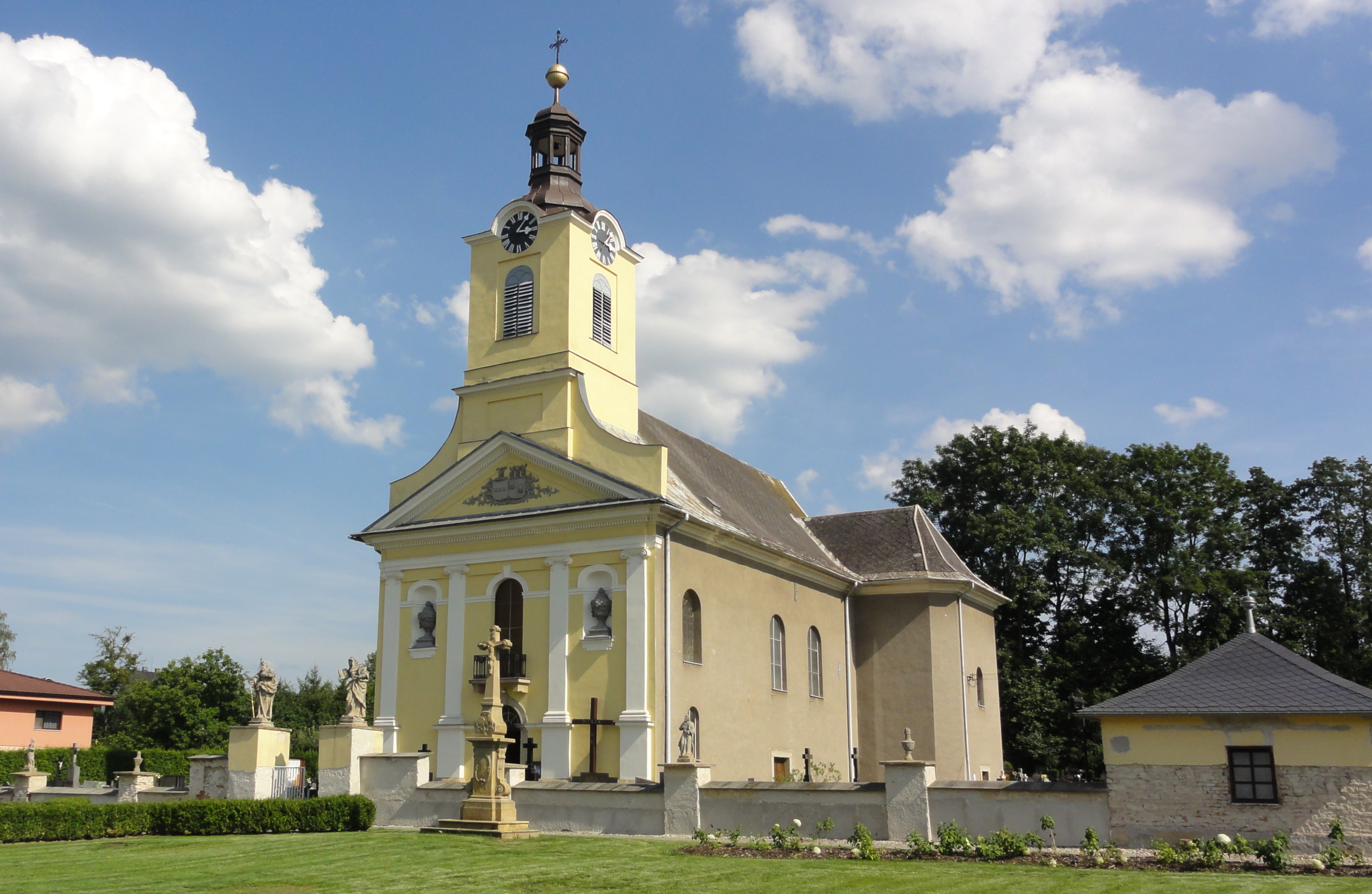
- Church of the Annunciation of the Virgin Mary

- Flag Coat of arms

- Location in the Czech Republic
- Coordinates: 49°42′19″N 18°36′49″E
- Country: Czech Republic
- Region: Moravian-Silesian
- District: Frýdek-Místek
- First mentioned: 1305

Area
  - Total: 10.11 km^{2} (3.90 sq mi)
- Elevation: 310 m (1,020 ft)

Population (2026-01-01)
  - Total: 1,728
  - Density: 170.9/km^{2} (442.7/sq mi)
- Time zone: UTC+1 (CET)
  - Summer (DST): UTC+2 (CEST)
- Postal code: 739 56
- Website: www.ropice.cz

Ropice (Czech pronunciation: [ˈropɪtsɛ]; Polish: Ropica, German: Roppitz) is a municipality and village in Frýdek-Místek District in the Moravian-Silesian Region of the Czech Republic. It has about 1,700 inhabitants. The municipality has a significant Polish minority.

== Etymology ==
The name is derived from the word ropa ('petroleum' in Czech and Polish).

== Geography ==
Ropice is located about 18 kilometres (11 mi) east of Frýdek-Místek and 24 km (15 mi) southeast of Ostrava, in the historical region of Cieszyn Silesia. It lies in the Moravian-Silesian Foothills. The highest point is the hill Štěpnice at 359 m (1,178 ft) above sea level. The Ropičanka Stream flows through the municipality. The Olza River forms the northeastern municipal border.

== History ==
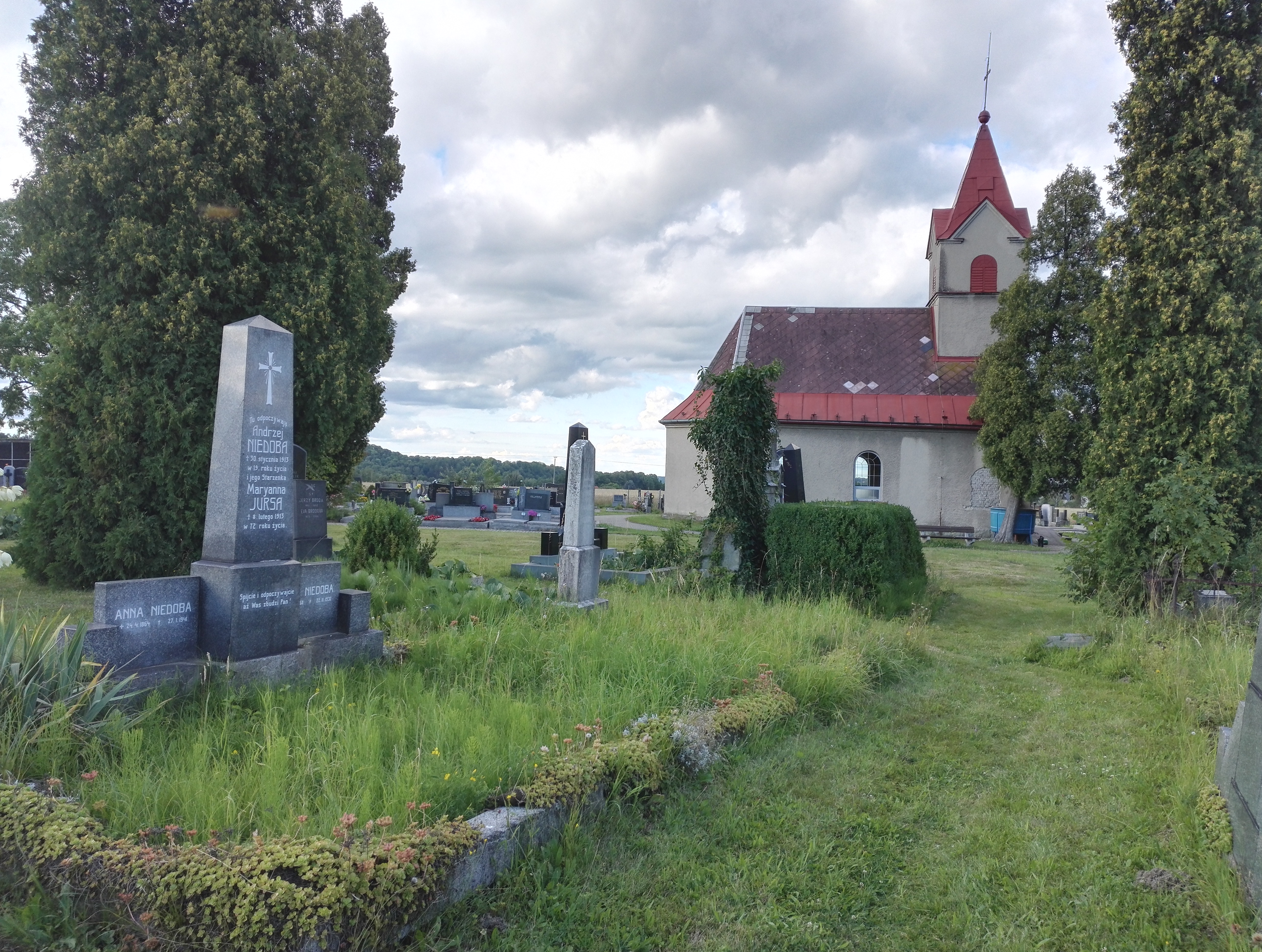
Lutheran cemetery with a chapel

The creation of the village was a part of a larger settlement campaign taking place in the late 13th century on the territory of what will be later known as Upper Silesia. Ropice was first mentioned in a Latin document of Diocese of Wrocław called Liber fundationis episcopatus Vratislaviensis from around 1305 as Ropiza. Politically Ropice belonged to the Duchy of Teschen (1297 described bilaterally as part of Poland), since 1327 within the Kingdom of Bohemia.

The village became a seat of a Catholic parish, mentioned in the register of Peter's Pence payment from 1447 among 50 parishes of Teschen deanery as Ropicza. After the 1540s Protestant Reformation prevailed in the Duchy of Teschen and a local Catholic church was taken over by Lutherans. It was taken from them (as one from around fifty buildings in the region) by a special commission and given back to the Roman Catholic Church on 26 March 1654.

In the early 15th century, a fortress was built in Ropice. The first known owners of Ropice were the Sobek family in 1430. The family owned the village until 1693. Around 1700, Ropice was acquired by Filip Saint Genois. He had rebuilt the fortress into a Baroque castle in the early 18th century. In 1785 the Saint Genois family sold Ropice to the Celesta family, who had made Neoclassical renovation of the castle in 1810.

After Revolutions of 1848 in the Austrian Empire, a modern municipal division was introduced in the re-established Austrian Silesia. The village as a municipality was subscribed to the political and legal district of Cieszyn. According to the censuses conducted in 1880–1910, the population of the municipality grew from 1,156 in 1880 to 1,291 in 1910 with a majority being native Polish-speakers (between 95.5% and 97.8%) accompanied by a small German-speaking minority (at most 39 or 3% in 1910) and Czech-speaking people (at most 19 or 1.5% in 1910). In terms of religion in 1910 the majority were Roman Catholics (53%), followed by Protestants (47%).

After World War I, Polish–Czechoslovak War and the division of Cieszyn Silesia in 1920, it became a part of Czechoslovakia. Following the Munich Agreement, in October 1938 together with the Trans-Olza region it was annexed by Poland, administratively adjoined to Cieszyn County of Silesian Voivodeship. It was then annexed by Nazi Germany at the beginning of World War II. After the war it was restored to Czechoslovakia.

In 1980, Ropice became a municipal part of Třinec. In 2000, it became again a separate municipality.

== Demographics ==
According to the 2021 Census, Polish minority makes up 19.6% of the population.

Historical population

Year	Pop.	±%
1869	1,083	—
1880	1,158	+6.9%
1890	1,202	+3.8%
1900	1,240	+3.2%
1910	1,289	+4.0%

Year	Pop.	±%
1921	1,255	−2.6%
1930	1,699	+35.4%
1950	1,470	−13.5%
1961	1,566	+6.5%
1970	1,461	−6.7%

Year	Pop.	±%
1980	1,416	−3.1%
1991	1,311	−7.4%
2001	1,348	+2.8%
2011	1,486	+10.2%
2021	1,618	+8.9%

Source: Censuses

== Transport ==
The I/68 road (part of the European route E75), which connects the D48 motorway with the Czech–Slovak border in Mosty u Jablunkova, runs through the southern part of the municipality. The I/11 road splits from it and runs through Ropice to Český Těšín.

Ropice is located on the railway line Frýdek-Místek–Cieszyn.

== Sport ==
There is a golf course in Ropice.

== Sights ==
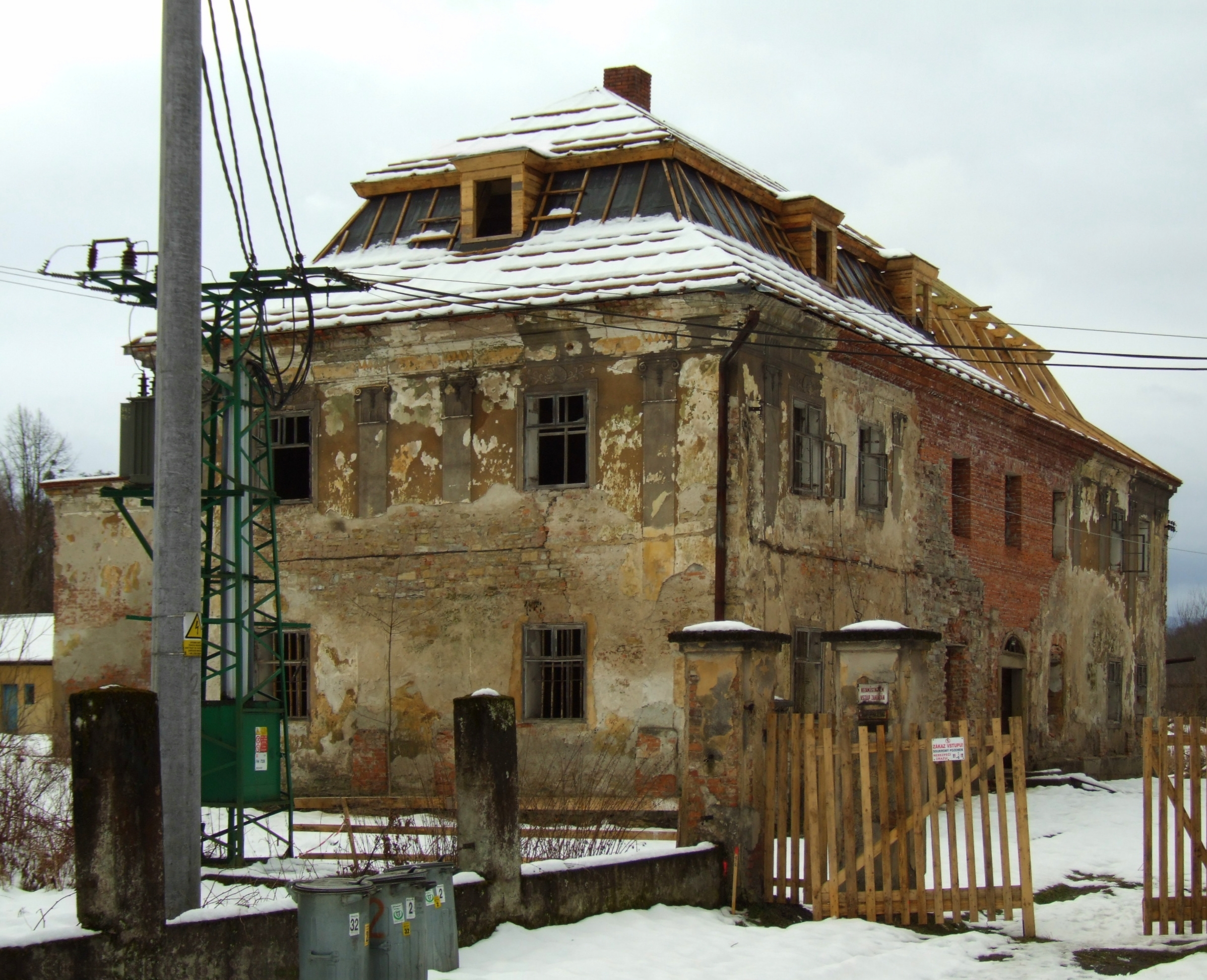
Dilapidated Ropice Castle in 2012

Ropice Castle was confiscated by the state in 1945 and until the 1970s it was used as a school. Then it was uninhabited and fell into disrepair. It is currently privately owned and since 2011 gradually reconstructed.

A parish church was built here in the second half of the 14th century and first mentioned in 1447. The Church of Saint Catherine was built in the Baroque style in 1733–1736, but was replaced by a new church in 1806 that was consecrated to the Annunciation of the Virgin Mary.

== Twin towns – sister cities ==
Ropice is twinned with:

- Jaworze, Poland
- Pribylina, Slovakia
