= Ropičanka =

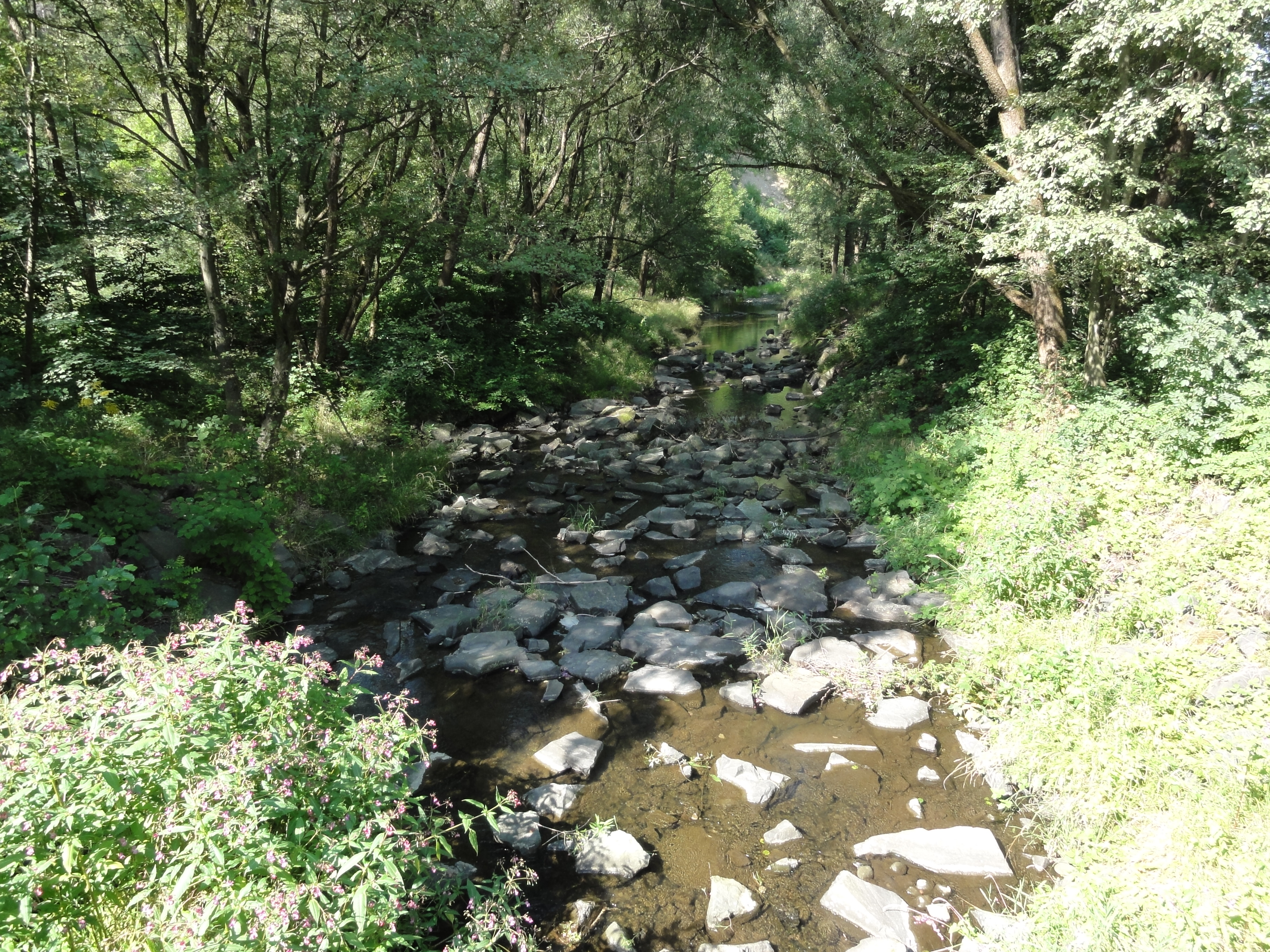
- The Ropičanka in Ropice

Location
- Country: Czech Republic
- Region: Moravian-Silesian

Physical characteristics
- Source
  - location: Řeka, Moravian-Silesian Beskids
  - coordinates: 49°36′0″N 18°35′23″E
  - elevation: 890 m (2,920 ft)
- Mouth
  - location: Olza
  - coordinates: 49°43′43″N 18°37′36″E
  - elevation: 272 m (892 ft)
- Length: 16.5 km (10.3 mi)
- Basin size: 36.7 km^{2} (14.2 sq mi)
- Discharge
  - average: 0.62 m^{3}/s (22 cu ft/s) near estuary

Basin features
- Progression: Olza→ Oder→ Baltic Sea

The Ropičanka (also called Řeka) is a stream in the Czech Republic, a left tributary of the Olza. It flows through the Moravian-Silesian Region. It is 16.5 km (10.3 mi) long.

== Etymology ==
The river is named after the village of Ropice.

== Characteristic ==
The Ropičanka originates in the territory of Řeka on the slopes of the Ropice Mountain in the Moravian-Silesian Beskids at an elevation of 890 m (2,920 ft) and flows to Český Těšín, where it merges with the Olza River at an elevation of 272 m (892 ft). It is 16.5 km (10.3 mi) long. Its drainage basin has an area of 36.7 km^{2} (14.2 sq mi).

The longest tributaries of the Ropičanka are:

Tributary	Length (km)	Side
Vělopolka	3.7	left
nameless brook	3.4	right

== Course ==
The stream flows through the municipal territories of Řeka, Třinec, Smilovice, Střítež, Ropice and Český Těšín.

== Nature ==
The upper course of the stream is located within the Beskydy Protected Landscape Area.

Among the species of fish living in the river are the alpine bullhead and river trout.

== See also ==
- List of rivers of the Czech Republic
