= Augustyn Łukosz =

Polish activist and socialist politician

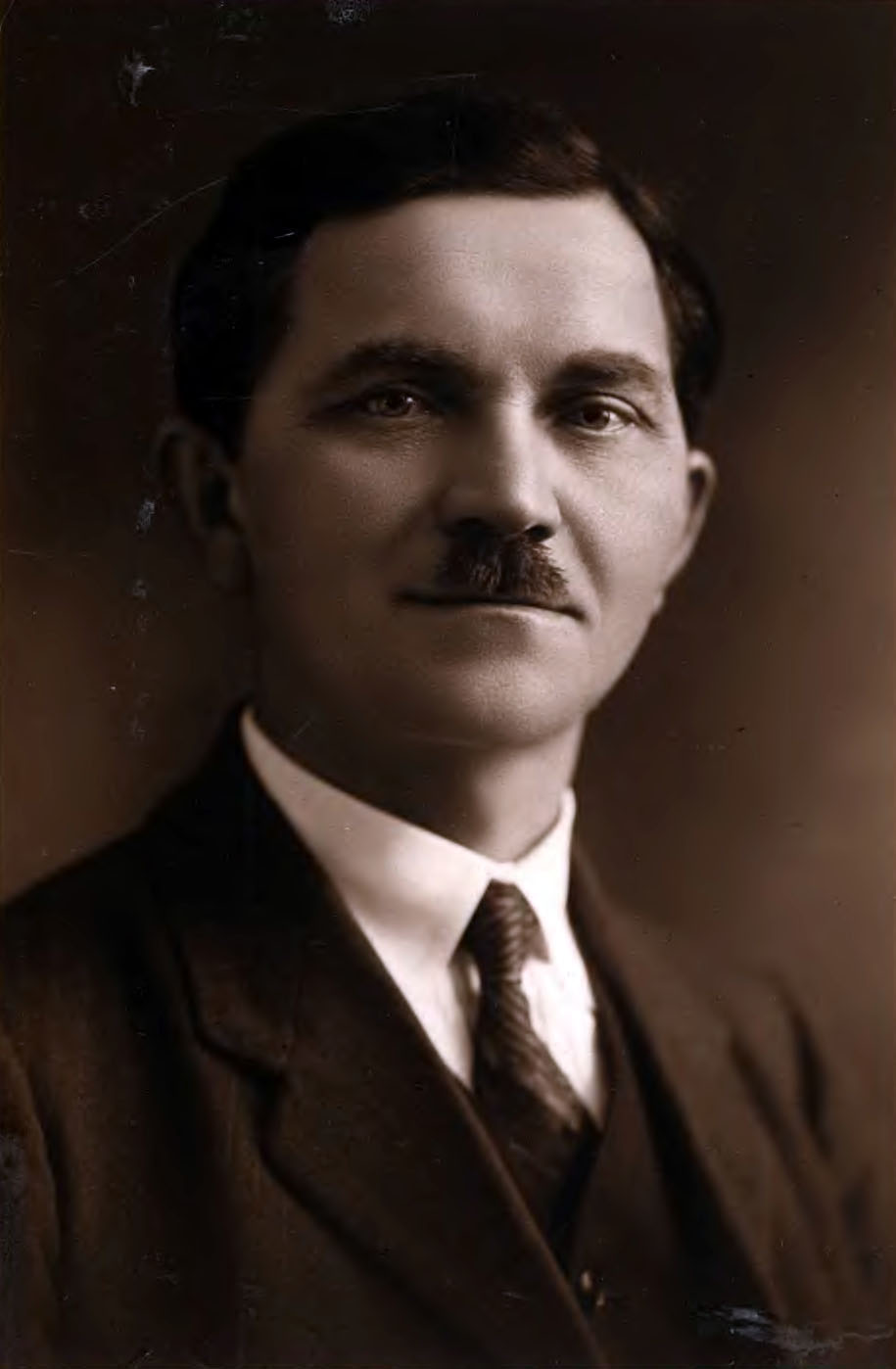
- Augustyn Łukosz

Member of the Silesian Parliament
- In office 1938–1939

Personal details
- Born: 17 August 1884 Stonawa, Austria-Hungary
- Died: 27 October 1940 (aged 56) Mauthausen-Gusen, Nazi Germany
- Party: Polish Socialist Workers Party
- Spouse: Teresa Szewczyk
- Children: Augustyna, Waleria

Augustyn Łukosz (17 August 1884 – 27 October 1940) was a Polish national activist and socialist politician. He was a member of the Polish Socialist Workers Party, the social democratic party active amongst the Polish minority in Czechoslovakia. In 1935 Łukosz founded the Polish Social Democratic Party (PPSD).

== Life ==
After graduating from the school in Stonawa, Łukosz worked as a coal miner in a mine in Karwina, and later as a railwayman, working as a switchman at the train station in Łąki nad Olzą. Łukosz was already in his youth engaged in the workers' movement, becoming a member of the Polish Social Democratic Party of Galicia (PPS-DG) and later the Polish Socialist Party. After division of Cieszyn Silesia, he stayed in Czechoslovakia, where he co-founded the Polish Socialist Workers Party (PSPR). He represented its faction opposed to the cooperation with communists. Łukosz contributed to the PSPR magazine Robotnik Śląski (Silesian Worker) and co-founded the Polish Educational-Sporting Association "Siła" in Český Těšín.

In August 1934 he was expelled from the PSPR due to the ideological discrepancies with the party leadership. He advocated the cooperation with the rest of the Polish organizations in Czechoslovakia, whereas the PSPR leadership followed the cooperation with the Czech social democrats.

From March to July 1935 he edited the PPSD press organ Naprzód (Forward). After the annexation of Trans-Olza region to Poland in 1938, President Ignacy Mościcki named him a deputy of the Silesian Parliament, where Łukosz was a deputy until the outbreak of World War II. In 1938 he was awarded the Officer's Cross of the Order of Polonia Restituta.

During the Nazi occupation, Łukosz was interred in the concentration camp in Skrochovice near Opava. On 16 April 1940, he was moved to Dachau concentration camp, and later to Mauthausen-Gusen concentration camp, where he died from exhaustion on 27 October 1940.
