= Stonava =

Stonava Stonawa
- Municipality
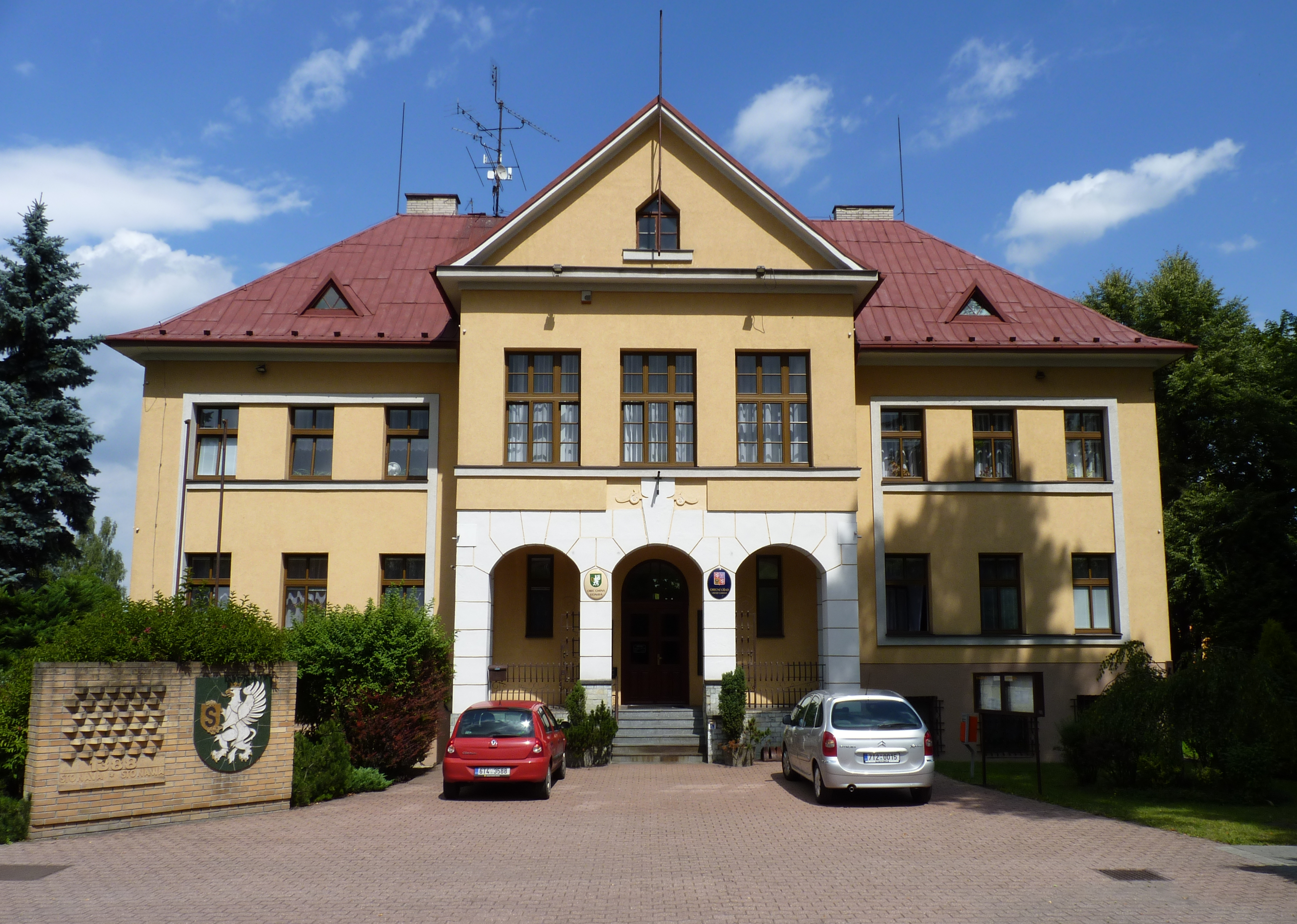
- Municipal office

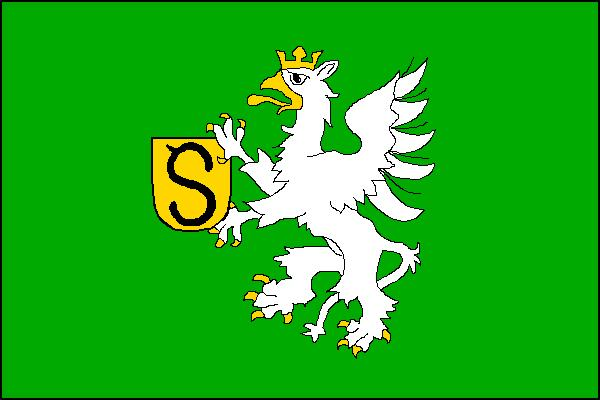
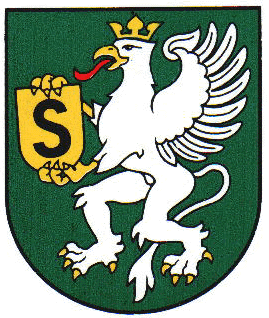
- Flag Coat of arms

- Location in the Czech Republic
- Coordinates: 49°49′0″N 18°31′31″E
- Country: Czech Republic
- Region: Moravian-Silesian
- District: Karviná
- First mentioned: 1388

Area
  - Total: 13.87 km^{2} (5.36 sq mi)
- Elevation: 259 m (850 ft)

Population (2026-01-01)
  - Total: 1,745
  - Density: 125.8/km^{2} (325.8/sq mi)
- Time zone: UTC+1 (CET)
  - Summer (DST): UTC+2 (CEST)
- Postal code: 735 34
- Website: www.stonava.cz

Stonava (Polish: Stonawa, German: Steinau) is a municipality and village in Karviná District in the Moravian-Silesian Region of the Czech Republic. It has about 1,700 inhabitants. The municipality has a significant Polish minority.

== Etymology ==
The name is derived from the older name of the Stonávka River, which itself denoted 'murmuring river'. As Stonawa it was then mentioned in 1432. The German name Steinau appeared in the 18th century.

== Geography ==
Stonava lies about 4 kilometres (2 mi) south of Karviná and 14 kilometres (9 mi) east of Ostrava. It lies in the Ostrava Basin in the historical region of Cieszyn Silesia. The Stonávka River flows through the municipality.

== History ==
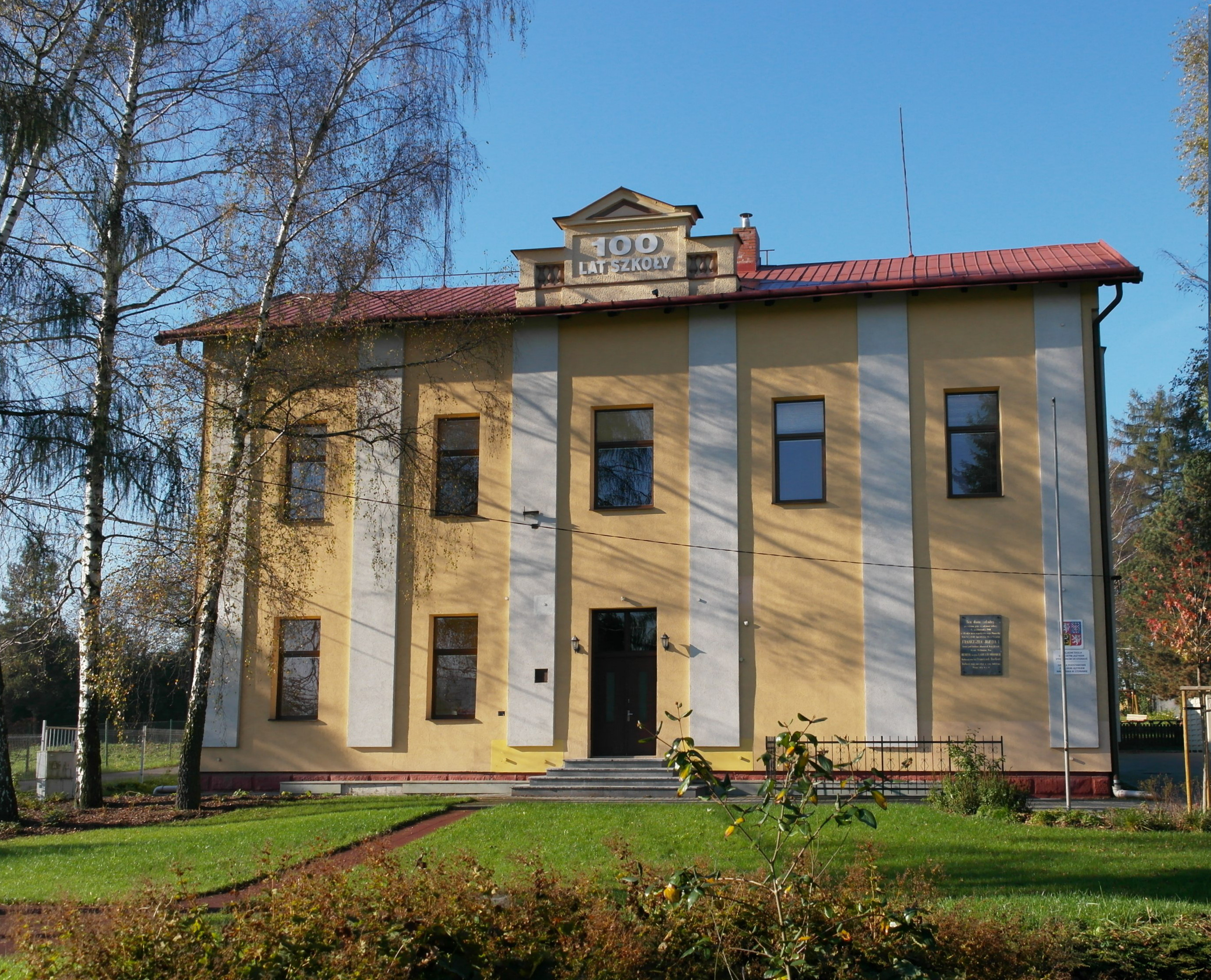
Polish primary school

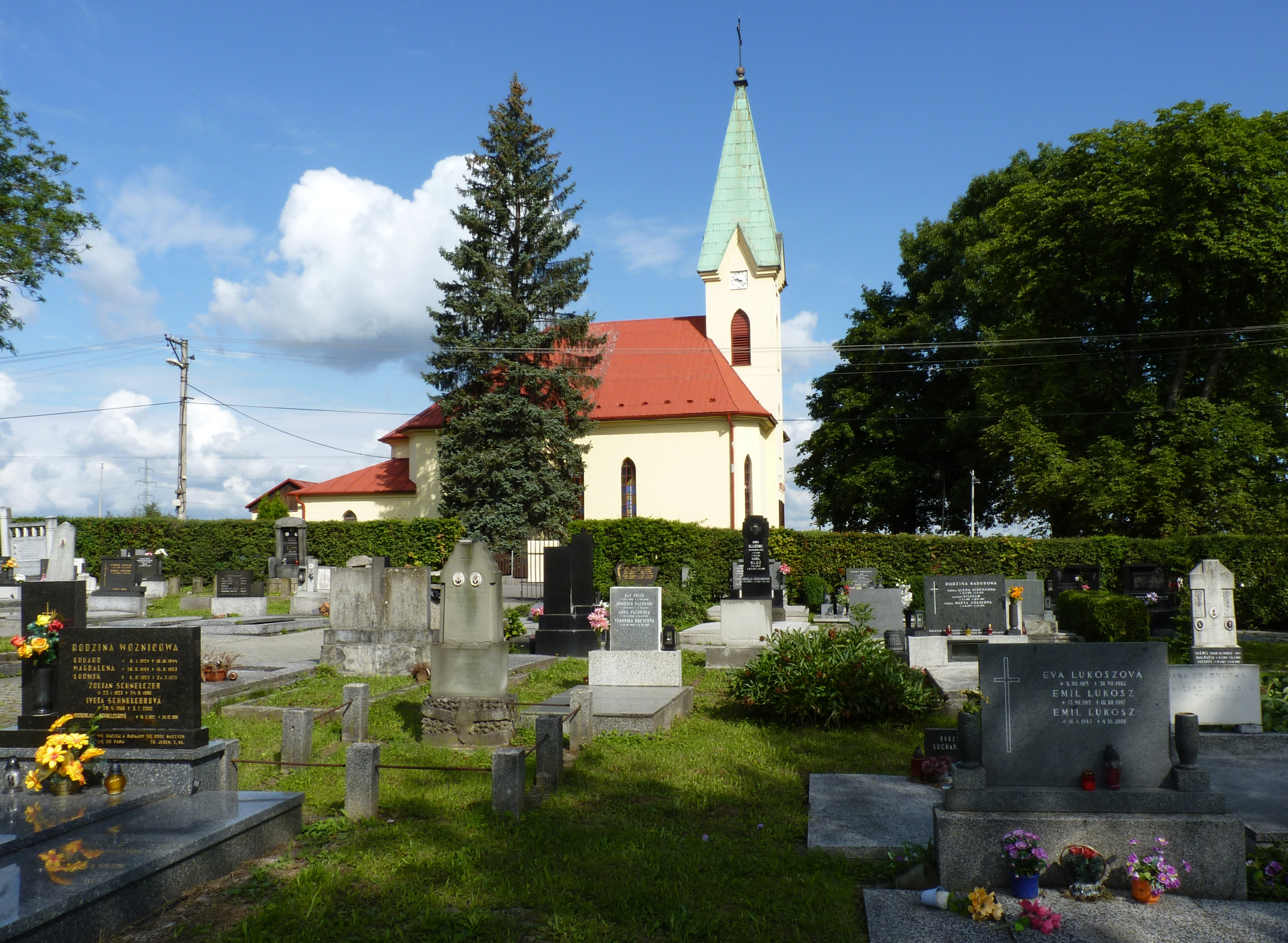
Lutheran church

The first written mention of Stonava (as Stoen) is from 1388, when lord Hanke von Stoen was mentioned as owner of Stonava. In 1580, a fortress in Stonava is first mentioned. The most notable owners of the fortress and the village was the Larisch family, which owned it shortly after 1590 and then from 1743 until 1945.

Politically the village belonged then to the Duchy of Teschen, formed in 1290 in the process of feudal fragmentation of Poland and was ruled by a local branch of Silesian Piast dynasty. In 1327 the duchy became a fee of the Kingdom of Bohemia, which after 1526 became a part of the Habsburg monarchy.

The village became a seat of a Catholic parish, mentioned in the register of Peter's Pence payment from 1447 among the 50 parishes of Teschen deanery as Stinavia. After the 1540s Protestant Reformation prevailed in the Duchy of Teschen and a local Catholic church was taken over by Lutherans. It was taken from them by a special commission and given back to the Roman Catholic Church in 1654.

After 1870, the village with a purely agricultural character changed its character with the development of hard coal mining. Many people subsisted on mining and new immigrants came, especially from the foothills and Galicia.

After the Revolutions of 1848 in the Austrian Empire, a modern municipal division was introduced in the re-established Austrian Silesia. The village as a municipality was subscribed at least since 1880 to political district and legal district of Freistadt.

According to the censuses conducted in 1880–1910, the population of the municipality grew from 2,040 in 1880 to 3,952 in 1910. The majority were Polish-speakers (growing from 90.1% in 1880 to 99% in 1910), accompanied by Czech-speakers (at most 158 or 7.8% in 1880, then dropping to between 0.1% and 0.4%) and German-speakers (at most 43 or 2.1% in 1880). In terms of religion, in 1910 the majority were Roman Catholics (77.7%), followed by Protestants (21.1%), 3 Jews and 42 others.

After World War I, the Polish–Czechoslovak War and the division of Cieszyn Silesia in 1920, the municipality became a part of Czechoslovakia. Following the Munich Agreement, in October 1938 together with the Trans-Olza region it was annexed by Poland, administratively organised in Frysztat County of Silesian Voivodeship. The municipality was then annexed by Nazi Germany at the beginning of World War II. After the war it was restored to Czechoslovakia.

== Demographics ==
According to the 2021 Census, Polish minority makes up 14.4% of the population.

Historical population

Year	Pop.	±%
1869	1,516	—
1880	2,040	+34.6%
1890	2,339	+14.7%
1900	3,135	+34.0%
1910	3,952	+26.1%

Year	Pop.	±%
1921	3,831	−3.1%
1930	4,819	+25.8%
1950	4,500	−6.6%
1961	4,511	+0.2%
1970	4,036	−10.5%

Year	Pop.	±%
1980	2,516	−37.7%
1991	1,714	−31.9%
2001	1,809	+5.5%
2011	1,728	−4.5%
2021	1,721	−0.4%

Source: Censuses

== Transport ==
The railway line Ostrava–Mosty u Jablunkova runs through the eastern part of the municipality, but there is no train station.

== Sights ==
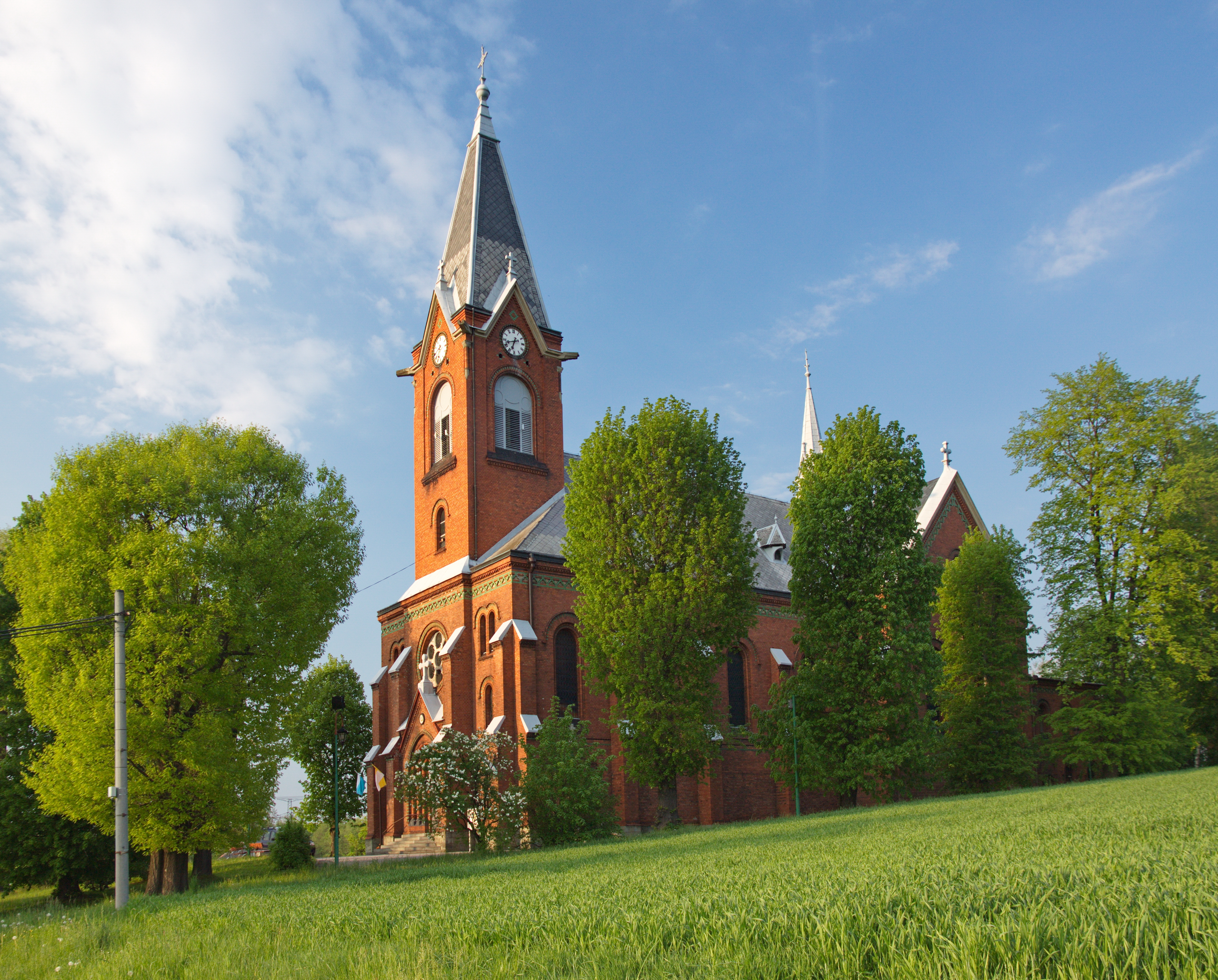
Church of Saint Mary Magdalene

The main landmark of the village is the Church of Saint Mary Magdalene. Its existence was first documented in 1447. The old church was replaced by a new wooden building in 1808 and then by a brick building in 1906–1910.

== Notable people ==
- Augustyn Łukosz (1884–1940), Polish politician
- Władysław Santarius (1915–1989), Polish Lutheran pastor
- Bruno Matykiewicz (born 1959), Polish weightlifter
