= Třanovice =

Třanovice Trzanowice
- Municipality
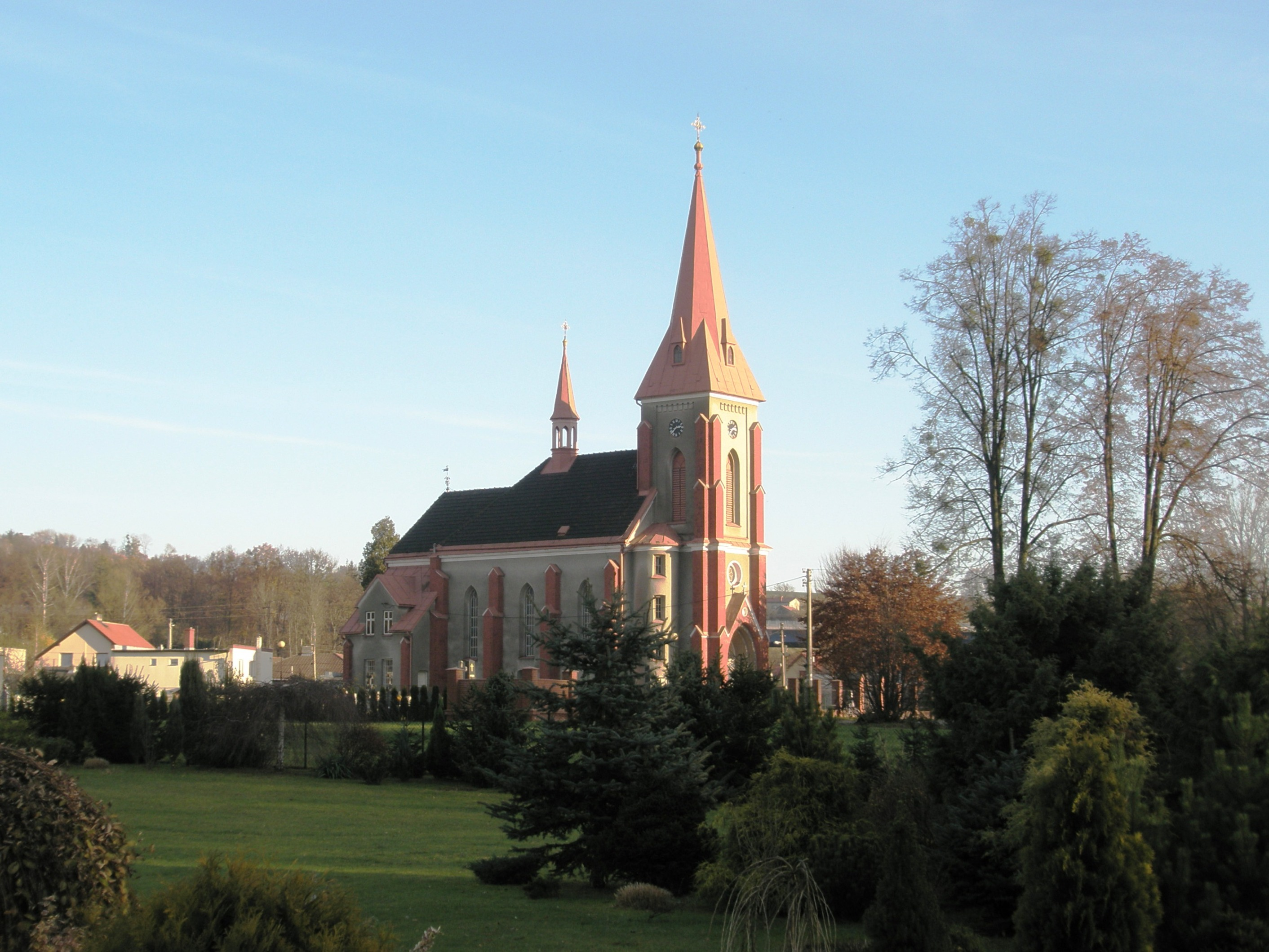
- Church of Saint Bartholomew

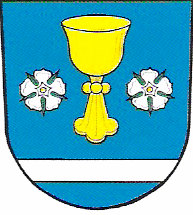
- Flag Coat of arms

- Location in the Czech Republic
- Coordinates: 49°42′45″N 18°31′45″E
- Country: Czech Republic
- Region: Moravian-Silesian
- District: Frýdek-Místek
- First mentioned: 1431

Area
  - Total: 8.61 km^{2} (3.32 sq mi)
- Elevation: 320 m (1,050 ft)

Population (2026-01-01)
  - Total: 1,111
  - Density: 129/km^{2} (334/sq mi)
- Time zone: UTC+1 (CET)
  - Summer (DST): UTC+2 (CEST)
- Postal code: 739 53
- Website: www.tranovice.cz

Třanovice (Czech pronunciation: [ˈtr̝̊anovɪtsɛ]; Polish: Trzanowice, German: Trzanowitz) is a municipality and village in Frýdek-Místek District in the Moravian-Silesian Region of the Czech Republic. It has about 1,100 inhabitants. The municipality has a significant Polish minority.

== Etymology ==
The name is derived from personal name Trzenek. The name evolved from Trzenkowicze (1431, 1450) through Trzankowicze (1523, 1578), Strzankowicze (1571) into Trzanowicze beginning from 1610 (Trzanowiczyche), also the division to Upper (Horní/Górne/Ober) and Lower part (Dolní/Dolne/Nieder) of the village began in the 16th and 17th centuries.

== Geography ==
Třanovice is located about 12 kilometres (7 mi) east of Frýdek-Místek and 19 km (12 mi) southeast of Ostrava. It lies in the Moravian-Silesian Foothills, in the historical region of Cieszyn Silesia. The Stonávka River flows through the municipality.

== History ==
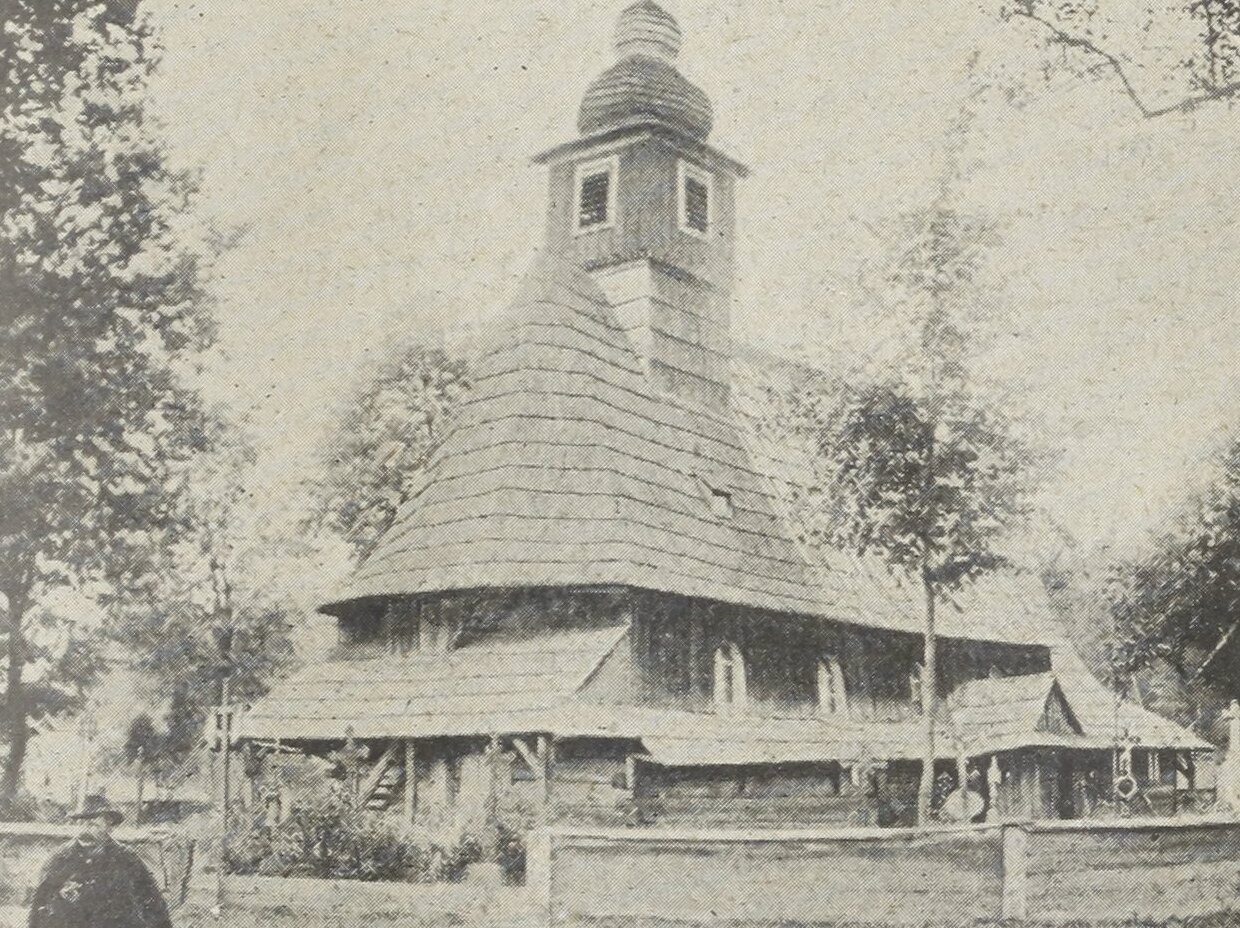
Old wooden church, before 1932

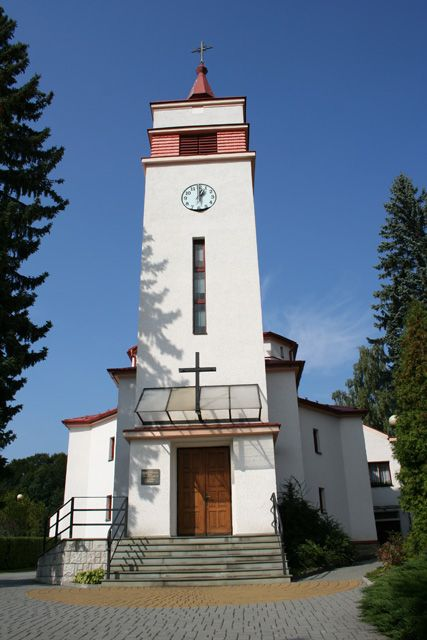
Lutheran church

The first written mention of Třanovice is from 1431. According to historian Vincenc Prasek, Třanovice was first mentioned already in 1322.

Politically Třanovice belonged then to the Duchy of Teschen, a fee of the Kingdom of Bohemia, which after 1526 became part of the Habsburg monarchy.

Třanovice became a seat of a Catholic parish probably prior to 16th century. After the 1540s, Protestant Reformation prevailed in the Duchy of Teschen and a local Catholic church was taken over by Lutherans. It was taken from them (as one from around fifty buildings in the region) by a special commission and given back to the Roman Catholic Church on 24 March 1654.

After Revolutions of 1848 in the Austrian Empire, a modern municipal division was introduced in the re-established Austrian Silesia. The village as a municipality was subscribed to the political and legal district of Cieszyn. According to the censuses conducted in 1880–1910, the population of the municipality dropped from 902 in 1880 to 875 in 1910 with a majority being native Polish-speakers (between 95.8% and 97.9%) accompanied by a small German-speaking minority (at most 38 or 4.2% in 1880) and Czech-speaking (at most 12 or 1.4% in 1910). In terms of religion in 1910 the majority were Protestants (53.9%), followed by Roman Catholics (45.2%).

After World War I Polish–Czechoslovak War and the division of Cieszyn Silesia in 1920, the municipality became a part of Czechoslovakia. Following the Munich Agreement, in October 1938 together with the Trans-Olza region it was annexed by Poland, administratively adjoined to Cieszyn County of Silesian Voivodeship. It was then annexed by Nazi Germany at the beginning of World War II. After the war, it was restored to Czechoslovakia.

== Demographics ==
According to the 2021 Census, Polish minority makes up 14.4% of the population.

Historical population

Year	Pop.	±%
1869	895	—
1880	902	+0.8%
1890	883	−2.1%
1900	852	−3.5%
1910	875	+2.7%

Year	Pop.	±%
1921	811	−7.3%
1930	873	+7.6%
1950	899	+3.0%
1961	970	+7.9%
1970	910	−6.2%

Year	Pop.	±%
1980	917	+0.8%
1991	870	−5.1%
2001	932	+7.1%
2011	1,057	+13.4%
2021	1,045	−1.1%

Source: Censuses

== Transport ==
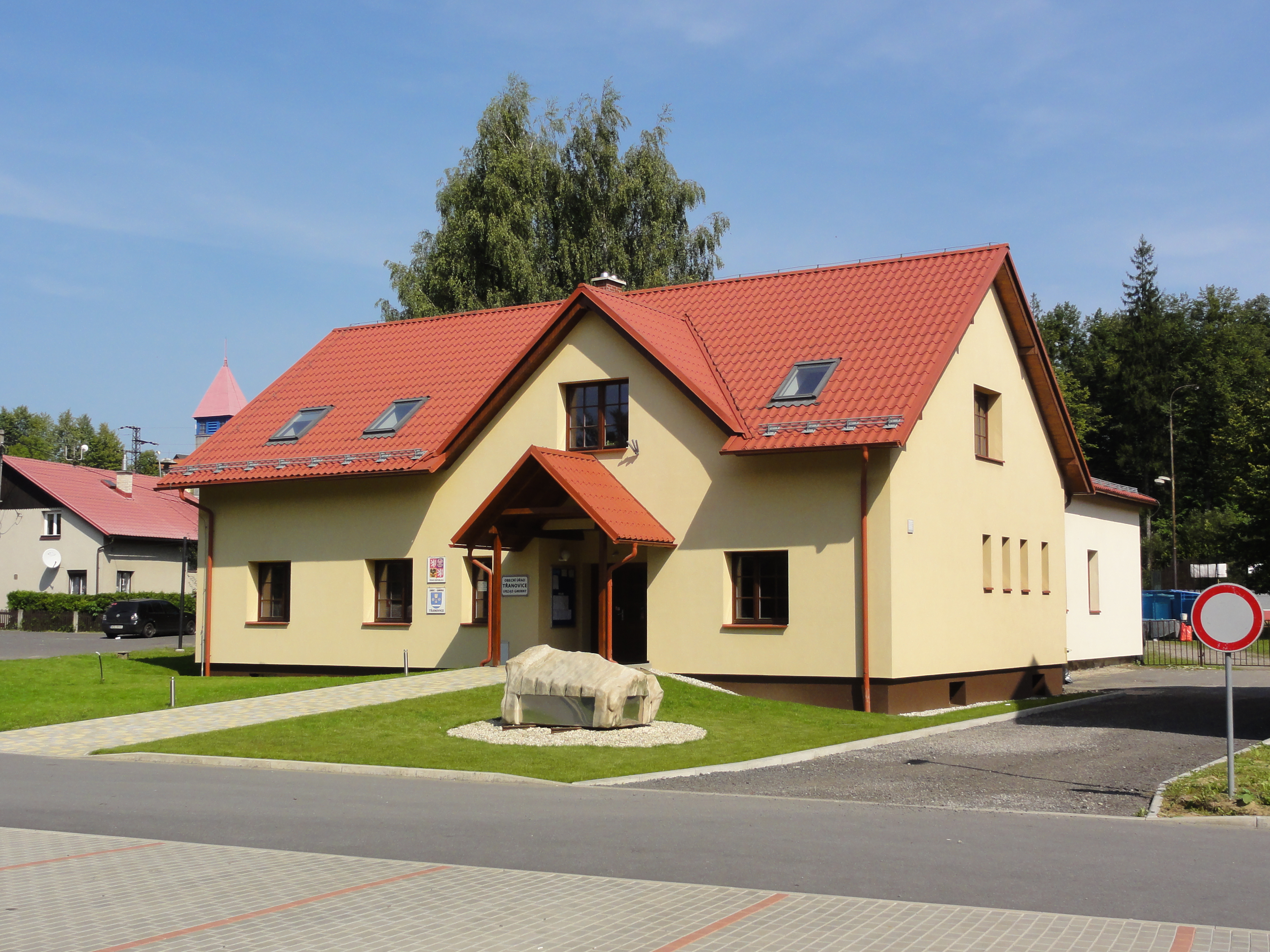
Municipal office

The D48 motorway from Frýdek-Místek to Český Těšín runs through the municipality. The I/68 road splits from it and leads to the Czech–Slovak border in Mosty u Jablunkova. This two main road are parts of the European routes E75 and E462 respectively.

== Sights ==
The main landmark of Třanovice is the Church of Saint Bartholomew. It was built in the neo-Gothic style in 1902–1904.

A tourist destination is the Museum of Jiří Třanovský. His family came from Třanovice.
