= Jiří Třanovský =

Lutheran priest and hymnwriter

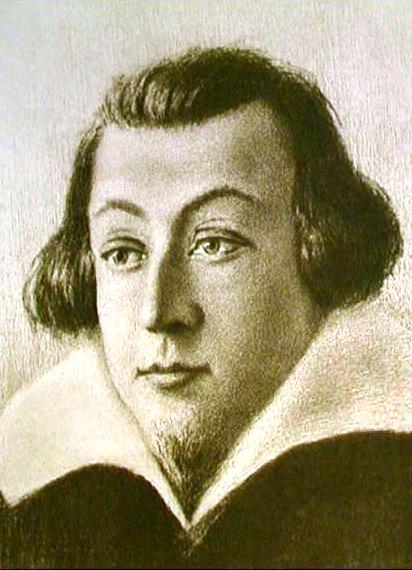

Rev.
- Born: 9 April, c. 1592; Teschen, Silesia, Crown of Bohemia (now Poland)
- Died: 29 May 1637 (aged approximately 45). Liptószentmiklós, Kingdom of Hungary (now Slovakia)
- Venerated in: Lutheranism
- Feast: 29 May

Jiří Třanovský (Polish: Jerzy Trzanowski, Slovak: Juraj Tranovský, Latin: Georgius Tranoscius; 9 April 1592 – 29 May 1637), was a Lutheran priest and hymnwriter from the Cieszyn Silesia. Sometimes called the father of Slovak hymnody and the "Luther of the Slavs," Třanovský's name is sometimes anglicized to George Tranoscius. Both the Evangelical Lutheran Church in America and the Evangelical Lutheran Church in Canada remember his life and work annually, on the anniversary of his death.

== Life ==
Třanovský was born in Cieszyn, and studied at Guben and Kolberg. In 1607, he was admitted to the University of Wittenberg where Martin Luther had taught less than a century earlier. Upon graduation, he traveled in Bohemia proper and Silesia and in 1612 became a teacher at St. Nicholas Gymnasium in Prague. Later, he became rector of a school in Holešov, Moravia.

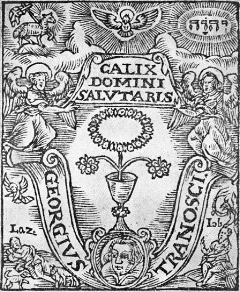
Třanovský's exlibris

In 1616 Třanovský was ordained a priest in Meziříčí and served as a pastor for four years. Persecution of Lutherans in Bohemia (after the Battle of White Mountain) under Ferdinand II forced him into exile. After imprisonment in 1623 and the deaths of two of his children from plague the following year, Třanovský accepted a call to be pastor to a church in Bielitz, Teschen Silesia. In 1627, he also became personal chaplain to Count Gáspár Illésházy. From 1631 until 1637, Třanovský served as pastor at a church in Liptovský Svätý Mikuláš (Liptószentmiklós), Kingdom of Hungary (present-day Slovakia).

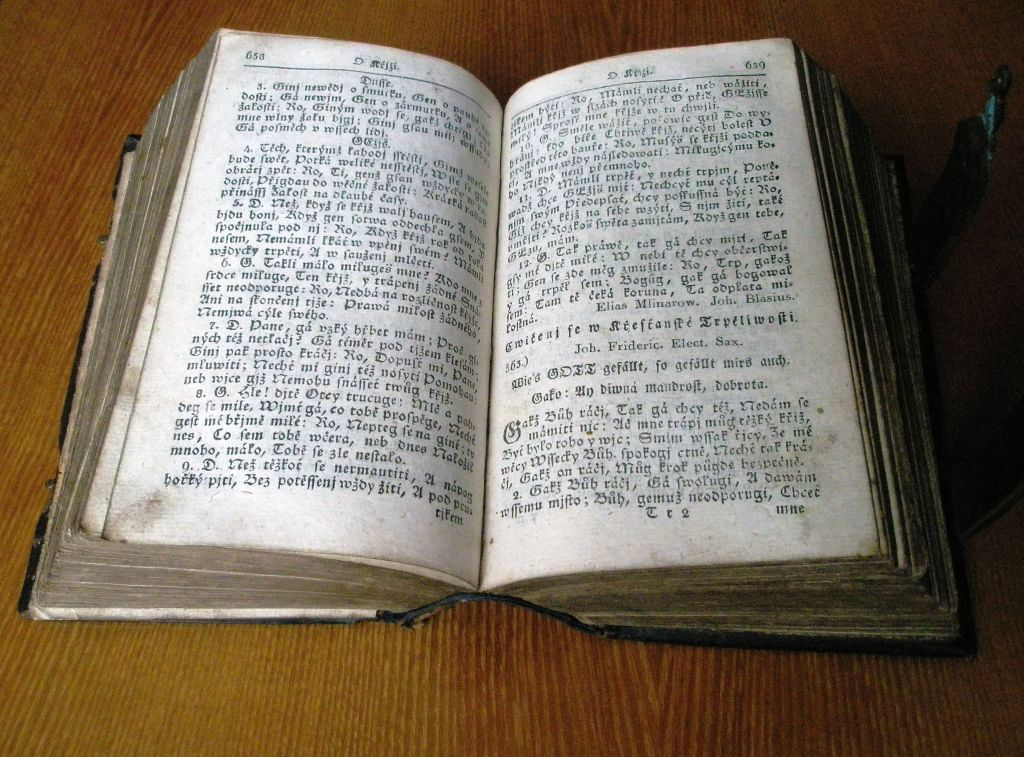
Cithara Sanctorum, 1828 edition

Třanovský appreciated poetry and hymns, and wrote as well as compiled both. In 1629, he published his first hymnal, oddly named in Latin Odarum Sacrarum sive Hymnorum Libri III ("Three Books of Sacred Odes or Hymns"). His most important and most famous work was Cithara Sanctorum ("Lyre of the Saints"), written in Czech, which appeared in 1636 in Levoča (Lőcse). This latter volume has formed the basis of Czech and Slovak Lutheran hymnody to the present day. Třanovský's hymnbook together with the Bible of Kralice (also in Czech) became the cornerstones of the Slovak Reformation. In 1620 Rev. Třanovský also translated the Augsburg Confession into Czech.

Třanovský died, aged forty-six, on 29 May 1637 and was buried in an unmarked grave at his church in Liptovský Mikuláš.

== Varia ==
- Uncle of Třanovský's wife Anne was theologian Amandus Polanus.

== See also ==
- Calendar of Saints (Lutheran)
