= Beskydy Dark-Sky Park =

Dark-sky preserve in the Czech Republic and Slovakia

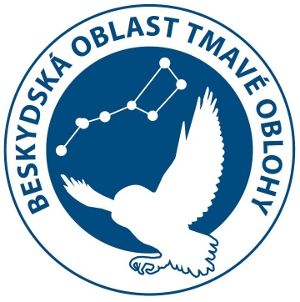
- Czech variant of the logo featuring the Ural owl and the Big Dipper
- Interactive map of Beskydy Dark-Sky Park
- Nearest city: (Czech Republic) Frýdlant nad Ostravicí (Slovakia) Turzovka
- Area: 308 km^{2} (119 sq mi)
- Established: 4 March 2013
- Website: www.boto.cz

The Beskydy Dark-Sky Park (Czech: Beskydská oblast tmavé oblohy – BOTO, Slovak: Beskydská oblasť tmavej oblohy) is a dark-sky preserve in Moravian-Silesian Beskids range in the Czech Republic and Slovakia. It has an area of 308 km^{2} (119 sq mi) and includes 12 municipalities: Staré Hamry, Bílá, Čeladná, Morávka, Krásná, Horní Bečva, and Ostravice in the Czech Republic and Makov, Korňa, Turzovka, Vysoká nad Kysucou, and Klokočov in Slovakia.

It was established in 2013 as the world's second international dark-sky preserve (after the Jizera Dark-Sky Park in 2009) with the primary goal of informing the public about the issue of light pollution, as well as protecting nature and the environment. It is supported by the Czech Astronomical Society.
