= Kysuca =

River in Slovakia

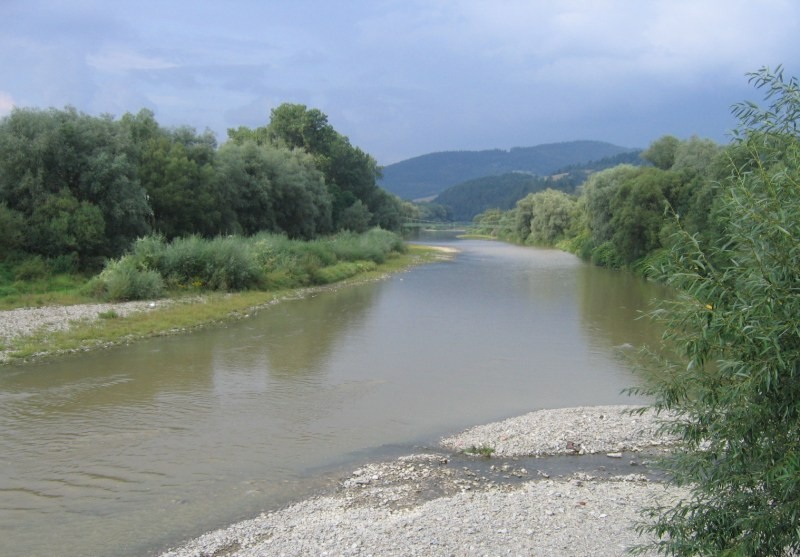
- River Kysuca near Kysucké Nové Mesto after short summer storm

Physical characteristics
- Source
  - location: Maple Mountains, near Makov (Žilina Region, Slovakia)
  - elevation: 610 m (2,000 ft)
- Mouth
  - location: Váh in Žilina
  - coordinates: 49°14′7″N 18°43′50″E
- Length: 65.6 km (40.8 mi)
- Basin size: 1,038 km^{2} (401 sq mi)
- Discharge
  - average: 17.7 m^{3}/s (630 cu ft/s)

Basin features
- Progression: Váh→ Danube→ Black Sea

The Kysuca (Hungarian: Kiszuca) is a river in northern Slovakia. It is a right tributary to the Váh. The river gives name to the informal Kysuce region. It is 65.6 km (40.8 mi) long and its basin size is 1,038 km^{2} (401 sq mi).

Its source is near the village of Makov. At first, the river flows in northeastern direction, where it flows around Javorníky on the right and Kysucké Beskydy mountains on the left side, passing through the town of Turzovka until the town of Čadca, where it turns south, between Javorníky on the right and Kysucká vrchovina mountains on the left side, passing Horelica, Krásno nad Kysucou, Kysucké Nové Mesto until it flows into the Váh in Žilina. In the valley of Kysuca south of Čadca, a railway and an international road (currently E75, in the future D3) passes through it.

== Etymology ==
The etymology is unclear, potentially related to the ancient name Cusus. In ancient times, it could be believed that the Kysuca is the mainstream of the Váh (Cusus). Alternatively Cusus was exclusively the name of the Kysuca.

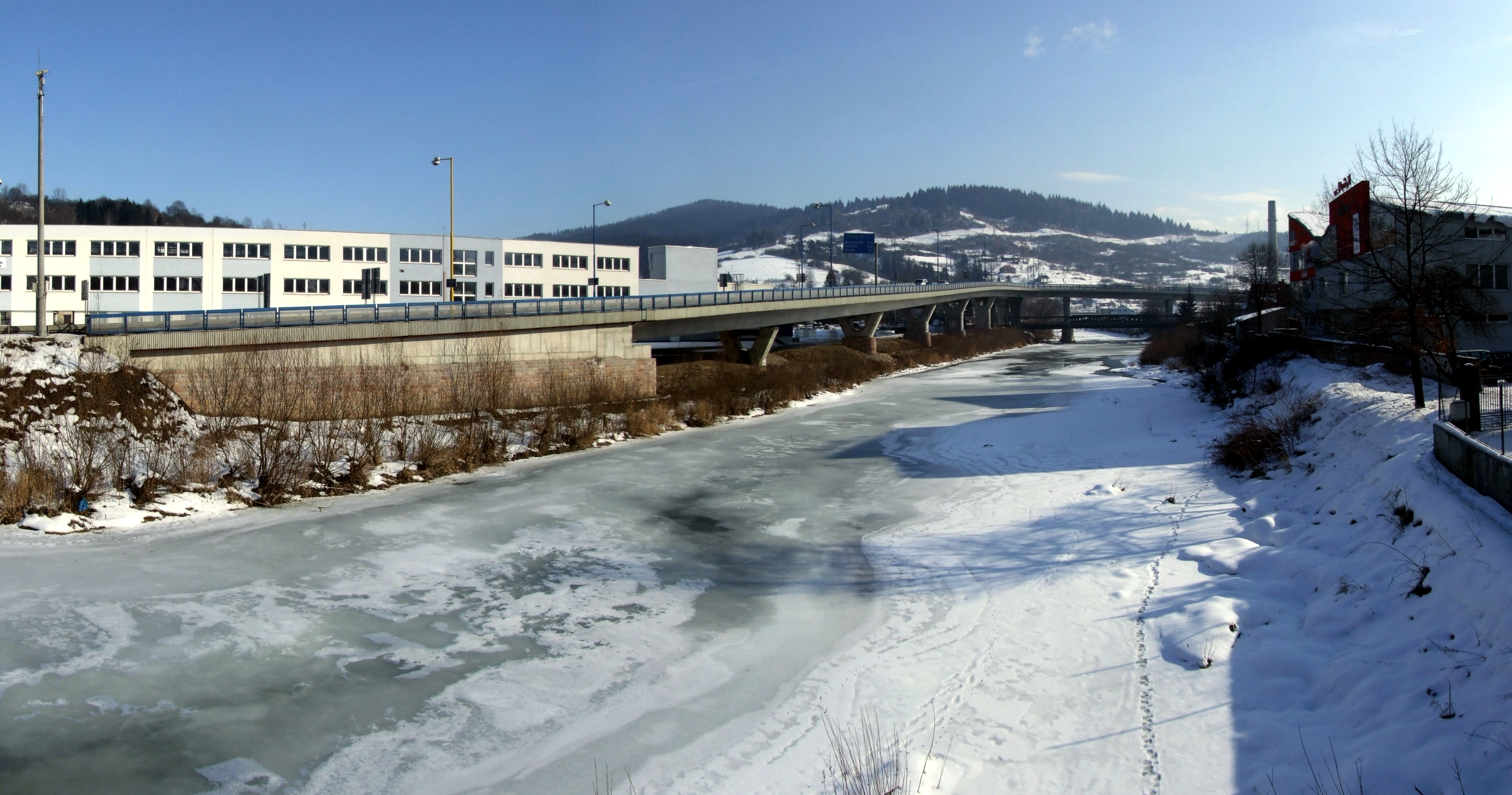
Kysuca river in winter - Čadca
