= Beskydy Protected Landscape Area =

Protected Landscape Area (PLA) in the Czech Republic

Beskydy
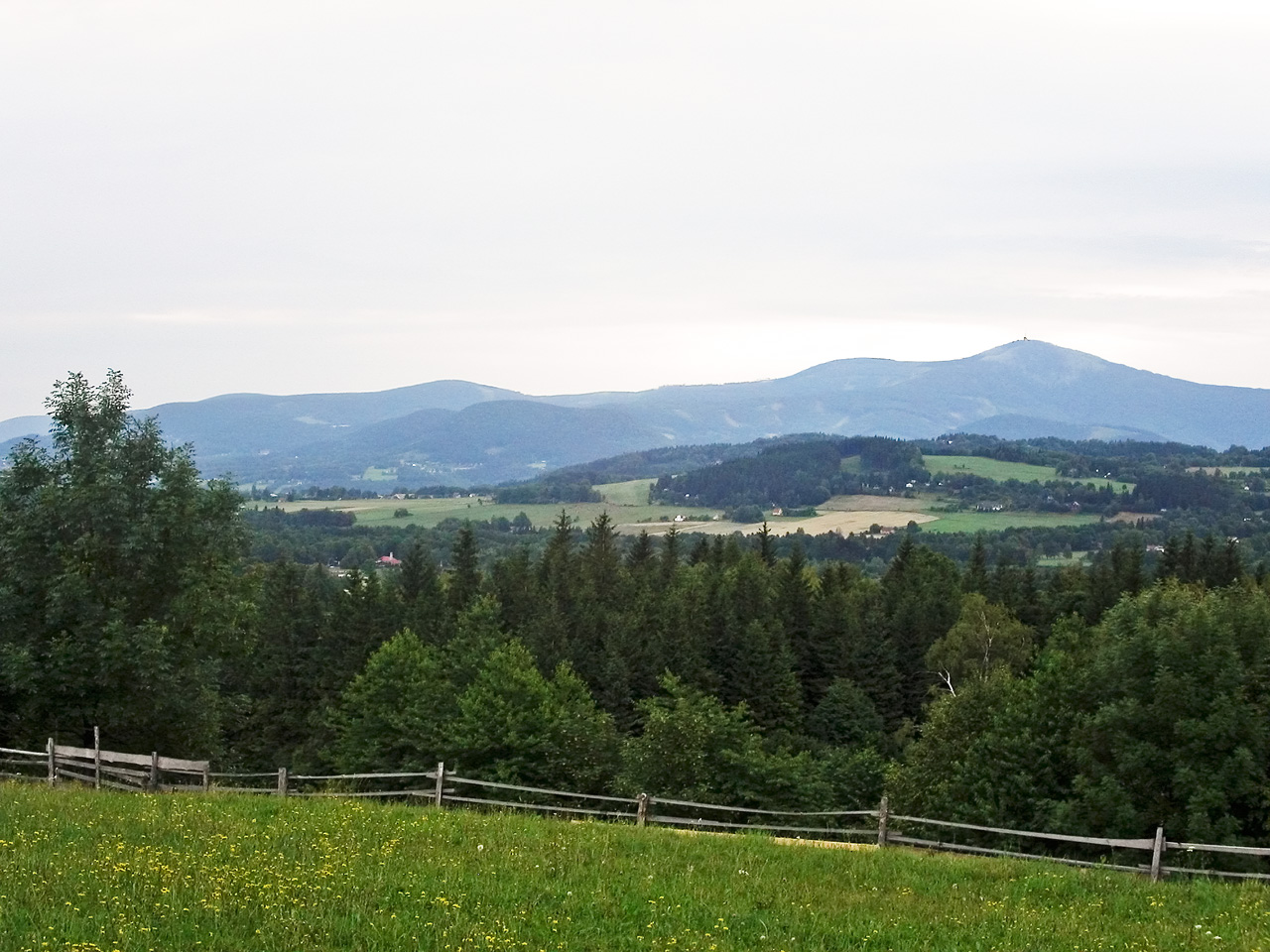
- View from Kunčice pod Ondřejníkem
- Location: Czech Republic
- Area: 1,160 km^{2} (450 sq mi)
- Established: 5 March 1973
- Operator: Beskydy PLA Administration
- Website: beskydy.ochranaprirody.cz/en/

Beskydy Protected Landscape Area (PLA) (Czech: Chráněná krajinná oblast Beskydy, abbreviated as CHKO Beskydy) is the largest PLA in the Czech Republic. The area is 1,160 km^{2} (450 sq mi).

== Geography ==
Beskydy PLA lies in the south-eastern part of the Moravian Silesian and eastern part of Zlín regions, on the border with Slovakia. All its area is located in the Outer Western Carpathians and comprises most of the Moravian-Silesian Beskids range, a large part of the Hostýn-Vsetín Mountains, and the Moravian part of the Javorníky range. In Slovakia, Kysuce Protected Landscape Area borders the area.

== Protection ==
Beskydy PLA was declared on 5 March 1973 to protect the unique natural features of the area but also the aesthetic value of the area which is typical for its diversity of habitats developed over the centuries of human settlement: ridge-top meadows and pastures and hamlets scattered throughout the area. Many rare and protected plants and animals can be found in Beskydy PLA: there has been a stable population of Eurasian lynx (Lynx lynx), Eurasian brown bear (Ursus arctos arctos) and Eurasian wolf (Canis lupus lupus) regularly cross from Slovakia.

Beskydy PLA represents a biologically relatively well-preserved landscape unit of the highest Carpathian Mountains in the Czech Republic. Among Beskydy's most significant natural values are the remnants of primeval forest stands with many rare Carpathian animal and plant species, meadow communities and pastures with high species diversity, unique surface and underground pseudokarst phenomena. Currently, 53 small–scale Specially Protected Areas are established within the PLA and more are at the preparatory stage. The exceptional aesthetic value and variety of the landscape is complemented by the strong folklore tradition and numerous preserved examples of folk architecture.

The entire PLA territory is nominated as a Site of Community Importance (SCI) under the European Union Natura 2000 system to protect 10 animal and 2 plant Species of Community Interest and 12 Habitats of Community Interest and also 2 Special Protection Areas (SPAs – Bird Areas) have also been declared (Horní Vsacko and Beskydy), to protect 8 species of predominantly forest birds.

There are 50 small-scale protected areas within the Beskydy PLA, including 7 national nature reserves, 28 nature reserve, and 24 nature monuments. The Čantoria National Nature Reserve near the Velká Čantoryje mountain, which lies outside the Beskydy PLA, is also administered by Beskydy PLA Administration.

== Tourism ==
The area is also an important recreational background for the industrial Ostrava region, with large resorts in towns on the edges of Beskydy PLA: Frýdlant nad Ostravicí, Frenštát pod Radhoštěm, Rožnov pod Radhoštěm, and others.
