= Kysuce Protected Landscape Area =

Protected landscape area of Slovakia

Kysuce Protected Landscape Area CHKO Kysuce
- IUCN category V (protected landscape/seascape)
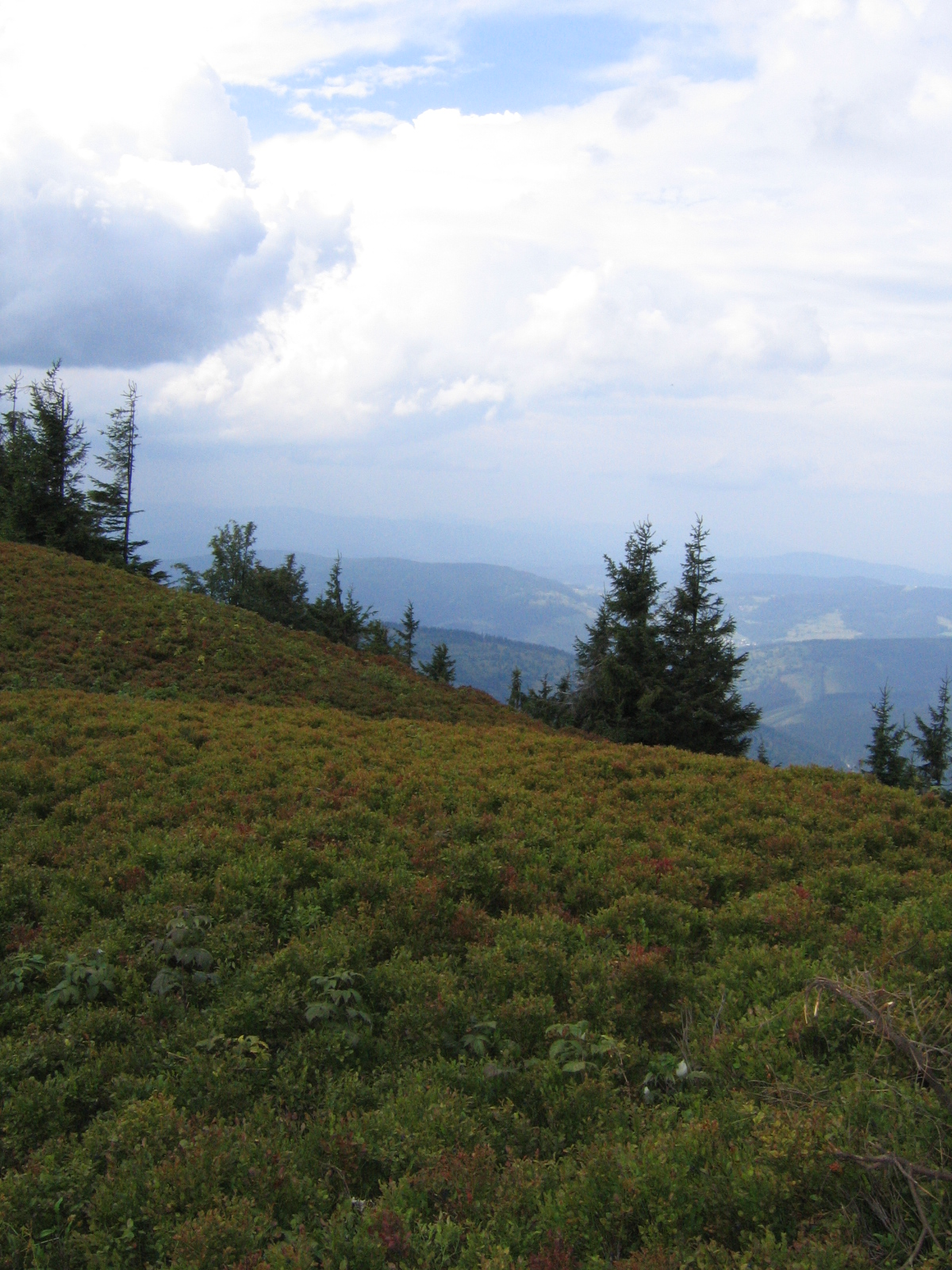
- Veľká Rača mountain
- Interactive map of Kysuce Protected Landscape Area; CHKO Kysuce
- Location: North-western Slovakia
- Coordinates: 49°25′N 18°57′E
- Area: 654.62 km^{2} (252.75 sq mi)
- Established: 23 May 1984
- Governing body: Správa CHKO Kysuce (Kysuce PLA administration) in Čadca

Kysuce Protected Landscape Area (Slovak: Chránená krajinná oblasť Kysuce) is one of the 14 protected landscape areas in Slovakia. It is made of two separate parts, the Javorníky mountains in the west, and Kysucké Beskydy mountains in the east, in north-western Slovakia. It is situated in the Čadca and Kysucké Nové Mesto districts, within the Kysuce region. It borders three other protected areas: the Beskydy Protected Landscape Area in the Czech Republic, Żywiec Landscape Park in Poland and Horná Orava Protected Landscape Area in Slovakia.

== History ==
The park was created on 23 May 1984. Protected areas declared before include Čierna Lutiša (1972), Veľká Rača (1976), Veľký Javorník (1967), and Vychylovské skálie (1983).

== Geography, geology and biology ==
More than half of the PLA's territory is covered by forests. Geologically, it is made of low-resistant sandstone layers. Due to the Vlach colonization, the area has a mosaic character, with alternating hamlets with original folk architecture, meadows, fields and forests. Curiosities of the region include crude oil spring near Korňa and mysterious sandstone balls. The area is near the westernmost border of area of great predators of Slovakia, such as the wolf, bear and lynx. A Carpathian endemic species living in the area is the Carpathian newt.

== Attractions ==
Attractions in the park include the Vychylovka (part of Nová Bystrica) switchback forest railway and Kysuce open-air museum.
