= Klubina =

Village and municipality in Slovakia

- Municipality
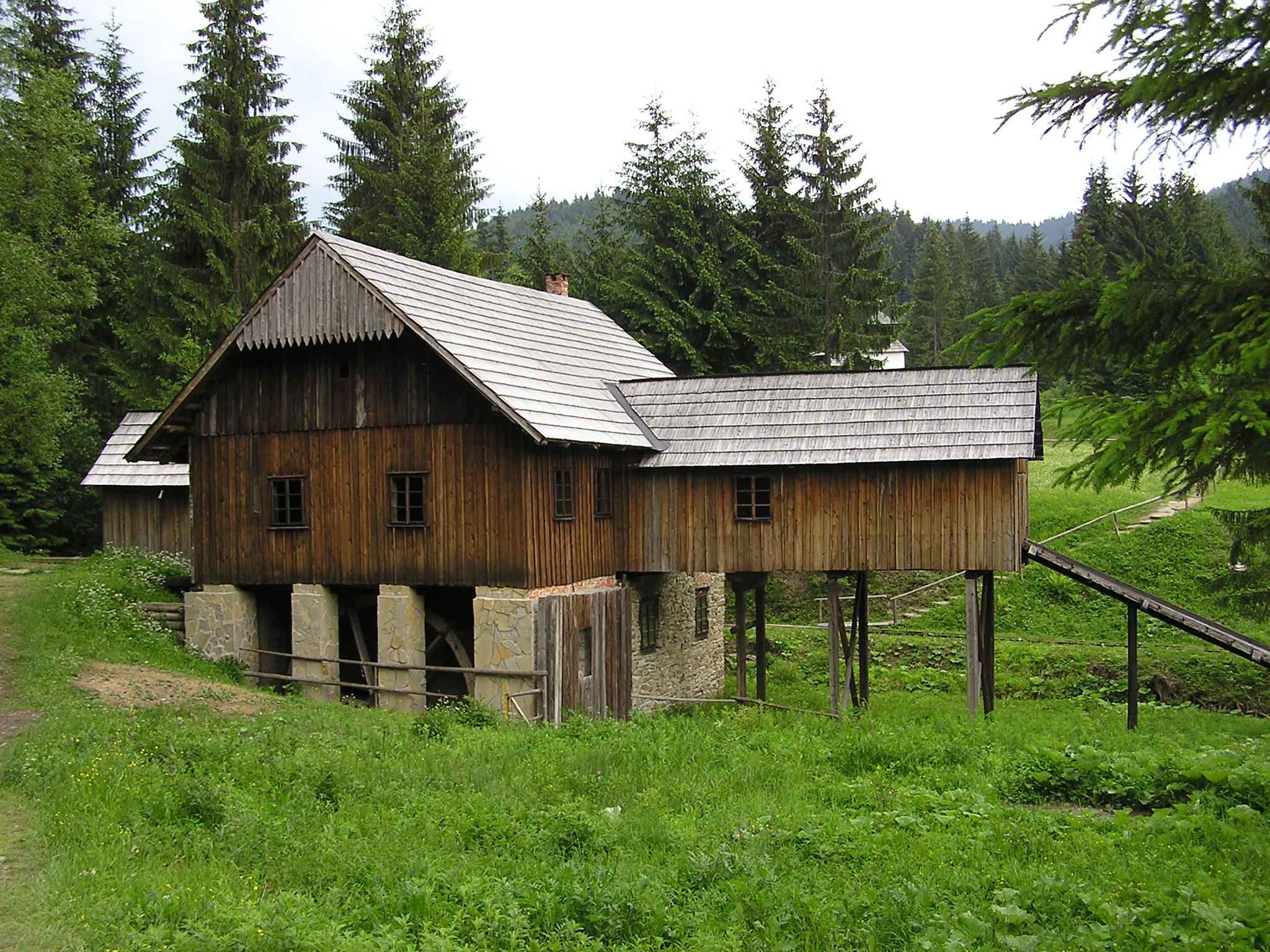
- A former Klubina mill at an open-air museum of vernacular architecture in the Kysuce Protected Landscape Area

- Flag

- Location of Klubina in the Žilina Region Location of Klubina in Slovakia
- Coordinates: 49.35°N 18.90°E
- Country: Slovakia
- Region: Žilina Region
- District: Čadca District
- First mentioned: 1662

Area
  - Total: 15.57 km^{2} (6.01 sq mi)
- Elevation: 455 m (1,493 ft)

Population (2025)
  - Total: 556
- Time zone: UTC+1 (CET)
  - Summer (DST): UTC+2 (CEST)
- Postal code: 230 4
- Area code: +421 41
- Vehicle registration plate (until 2022): CA
- Website: klubina.sk

Klubina (Hungarian: Kelebény) is a village and municipality in Čadca District in the Žilina Region of northern Slovakia.

== History ==
In historical records the village was first mentioned in 1662.

== Geography ==
The municipality lies at an altitude of 455 metres (1,493 ft) and covers an area of 15.57 km^{2} (6.01 sq mi) (2025).

== Population ==
Population statistic (10 years)
Year	1995	2005	2015	2025
Count	534	507	539	556
Difference		−5.05%	+6.31%	+3.15%

Population statistic
Year	2024	2025
Count	555	556
Difference		+0.18%

It has a population of 556 people (31 December 2025).

=== Ethnicity ===
Census 2021 (1+%)
Ethnicity	Number	Fraction
Slovak	523	97.39%
Not found out	14	2.6%
Total	537	

In year 2021 was 537 people by ethnicity 523 as Slovak, 14 as Not found out, 2 as Czech and 1 as Russian.

Note on population: The difference values of population numbers in the table "Population statistic" and in the sections "Ethnicity" & "Religion" is caused by the use of various statistical methods.

=== Religion ===
Census 2021 (1+%)
Religion	Number	Fraction
Roman Catholic Church	479	89.2%
None	35	6.52%
Not found out	13	2.42%
Total	537	

In year 2021 was 537 people by religion 479 from Roman Catholic Church, 35 from None, 13 from Not found out, 4 from Christian Congregations in Slovakia, 3 from Evangelical Church, 2 from Greek Catholic Church and 1 from Ad hoc movements.

== Genealogical resources ==
The records for genealogical research are available at the state archive "Statny Archiv in Bytca, Slovakia"

- Roman Catholic church records (births/marriages/deaths): 1689-1907 (parish B)

== See also ==
- List of municipalities and towns in Slovakia
