= Čadca =

- Municipality
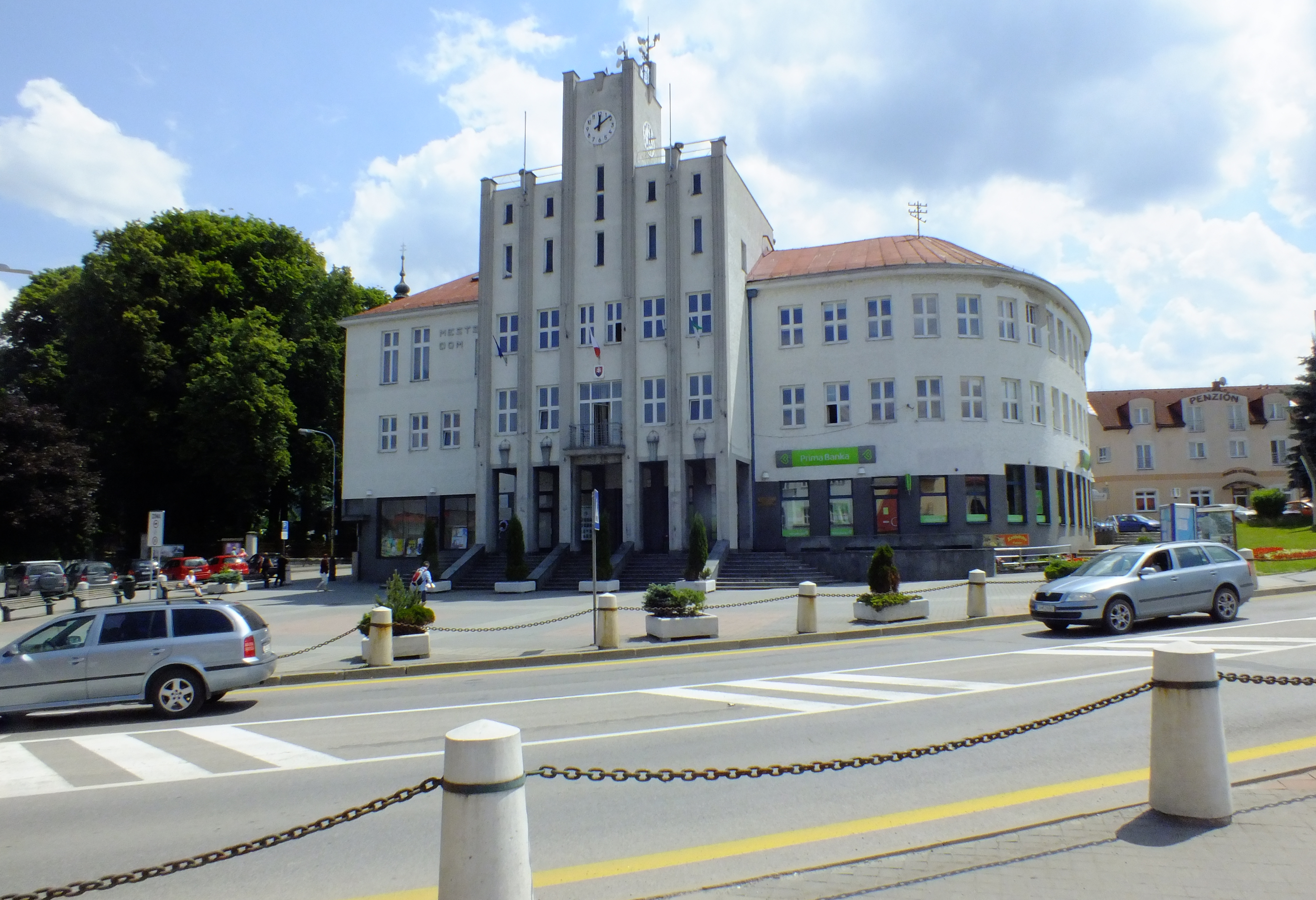
- Čadca - town center

- Flag Coat of arms

- Location of Čadca in the Žilina Region Location of Čadca in Slovakia
- Coordinates: 49.44°N 18.79°E
- Country: Slovakia
- Region: Žilina Region
- District: Čadca District
- First mentioned: 1598

Government
  - Mayor: Matej Šimášek

Area
  - Total: 56.76 km^{2} (21.92 sq mi)
- Elevation: 506 m (1,660 ft)

Population (2025)
  - Total: 22,072
- Time zone: UTC+1 (CET)
  - Summer (DST): UTC+2 (CEST)
- Postal code: 220 1
- Area code: +421 41
- Vehicle registration plate (until 2022): CA
- Website: www.mestocadca.sk

Čadca (until 1918 Čatca, Czača, Hungarian: Csaca, Polish: Czadca) is a district town in northern Slovakia, near the border with Poland and the Czech Republic.

== Etymology ==
The name is derived from a word čad (smoke, soot; Proto-Slavic: čadъ, Slovak/Czech: čad, Polish: czad ). The form Čadca is a toponymic appellative. The name was probably motivated by the burning glades.

== Geography ==
The municipality lies at an altitude of 506 metres (1,660 ft) and covers an area of 56.76 km^{2} (21.92 sq mi) (2025).

It is located south of the Jablunkov Pass, surrounded by the Javorníky, Kysucké Beskydy and Turzovská vrchovina mountain ranges. It lies in the valley of the Kysuca river, around 30 kilometres (19 miles) north of Žilina and is part of the historic region of Kysuce. A Goral minority lives in the surroundings.

=== Climate ===
Čadca has a humid continental climate (Köppen: Dfb).

Climate data for Čadca
Month	Jan	Feb	Mar	Apr	May	Jun	Jul	Aug	Sep	Oct	Nov	Dec	Year
Mean daily maximum °C (°F)	−0.1 (31.8)	2.3 (36.1)	6.8 (44.2)	12.8 (55.0)	17.1 (62.8)	20.7 (69.3)	22.4 (72.3)	22.5 (72.5)	17.5 (63.5)	12.5 (54.5)	6.8 (44.2)	1.4 (34.5)	11.9 (53.4)
Daily mean °C (°F)	−2.5 (27.5)	−0.7 (30.7)	2.8 (37.0)	8.0 (46.4)	12.5 (54.5)	16.2 (61.2)	17.7 (63.9)	17.5 (63.5)	12.8 (55.0)	8.4 (47.1)	3.9 (39.0)	−0.7 (30.7)	8.0 (46.4)
Mean daily minimum °C (°F)	−5.2 (22.6)	−3.8 (25.2)	−1.1 (30.0)	3.1 (37.6)	7.4 (45.3)	11.2 (52.2)	12.7 (54.9)	12.6 (54.7)	8.6 (47.5)	4.9 (40.8)	1.2 (34.2)	−3.0 (26.6)	4.1 (39.3)
Average precipitation mm (inches)	75.9 (2.99)	73.1 (2.88)	70.3 (2.77)	69.5 (2.74)	119.5 (4.70)	116.2 (4.57)	137.2 (5.40)	117.3 (4.62)	100.6 (3.96)	73.0 (2.87)	67.9 (2.67)	68.9 (2.71)	1,089.4 (42.88)
Source: Weather.Directory

== History ==
The town was established in the 17th century; the first written reference dates back to 1565 as Tzaczcka. The town charter was granted in 1778.

== Population ==
Historical population
Year	Pop.	±%
1970	14,365	—
1980	19,319	+34.5%
1991	25,183	+30.4%
2001	26,699	+6.0%
2011	24,959	−6.5%
2021	23,328	−6.5%
Source: Censuses

Population statistic (10 years)
Year	1995	2005	2015	2025
Count	26,475	26,004	24,579	22,072
Difference		−1.77%	−5.47%	−10.19%

Population statistic
Year	2024	2025
Count	22,307	22,072
Difference		−1.05%

It has a population of 22,072 people (31 December 2025).

=== Ethnicity ===
Census 2021 (1+ %)
Ethnicity	Number	Fraction
Slovak	21,407	91.76%
Not found out	1791	7.67%
Czech	241	1.03%
Total	23,328	

In year 2021 was 23,328 people by ethnicity 21,407 as Slovak, 1791 as Not found out, 241 as Czech, 45 as Other, 34 as Russian, 25 as Romani, 23 as Ukrainian, 18 as Polish, 18 as Hungarian, 12 as German, 10 as Chinese, 10 as Vietnamese, 8 as Italian, 5 as Rusyn, 4 as Jewish, 4 as Moravian, 4 as Canadian, 3 as Serbian, 3 as Croatian, 2 as Irish, 2 as Austrian, 2 as English, 2 as Albanian, 1 as Silesian and 1 as Iranian.

Note on population: The difference values of population numbers in the table "Population statistic" and in the sections "Ethnicity" & "Religion" is caused by the use of various statistical methods.

=== Religion ===
Census 2021 (1+ %)
Religion	Number	Fraction
Roman Catholic Church	18,429	79%
None	2451	10.51%
Not found out	1741	7.46%
Total	23,328	

In year 2021 was 23,328 people by religion 18,429 from Roman Catholic Church, 2451 from None, 1741 from Not found out, 129 from Evangelical Church, 106 from Greek Catholic Church, 105 from Christian Congregations in Slovakia, 63 from Other, 61 from Ad hoc movements, 54 from Jehovah's Witnesses, 49 from Other and not ascertained christian church, 33 from Buddhism, 23 from Calvinist Church, 22 from Eastern Orthodox Church, 14 from Old Catholic Church, 11 from Paganism and natural spirituality, 7 from Seventh-day Adventist Church, 6 from Islam, 5 from Jewish community, 5 from Apostolic Church, 4 from Church of Jesus Christ of Latter-day Saints, 3 from Czechoslovak Hussite Church, 2 from New Apostolic Church, 2 from Hinduism, 1 from United Methodist Church, 1 from Baptists Church and 1 from Bahá'i Community.

== Industry ==
One of the world's largest (and last) producers of vacuum tubes, JJ Electronic has a factory in Čadca.

== Transport ==
Čadca railway station is the town's main station. It forms part of the cross-border Žilina–Čadca–Svrčinovec zastávka–Mosty u Jablunkova railway (to the Czech Republic), and is also a junction station for two other lines, one of them also cross-border (to Poland).

The station offers services to several destinations in the two cross-border countries. For the Czech Republic, there are many trains to Ostrava, Bohumín or Prague, operated by trains of the České dráhy and LEO Express companies, and to Poland, there are trains towards Zwardoń.

== Notable people ==
- Karin Ann (born 2002), singer and songwriter
- Ľubomír Michalík (born 1983), footballer

== Twin towns – sister cities ==
Čadca is twinned with:

- Valašské Meziříčí, Czech Republic
- Toruń, Poland
- Żywiec, Poland

== See also ==
- List of municipalities and towns in Slovakia

== Genealogical resources ==
The records for genealogical research are available at the state archive "Statny Archiv in Bytca, Slovakia"

- Roman Catholic church records (births/marriages/deaths): 1742-1902 (parish A)
