= Čierne =

Village and municipality in Slovakia

- Municipality
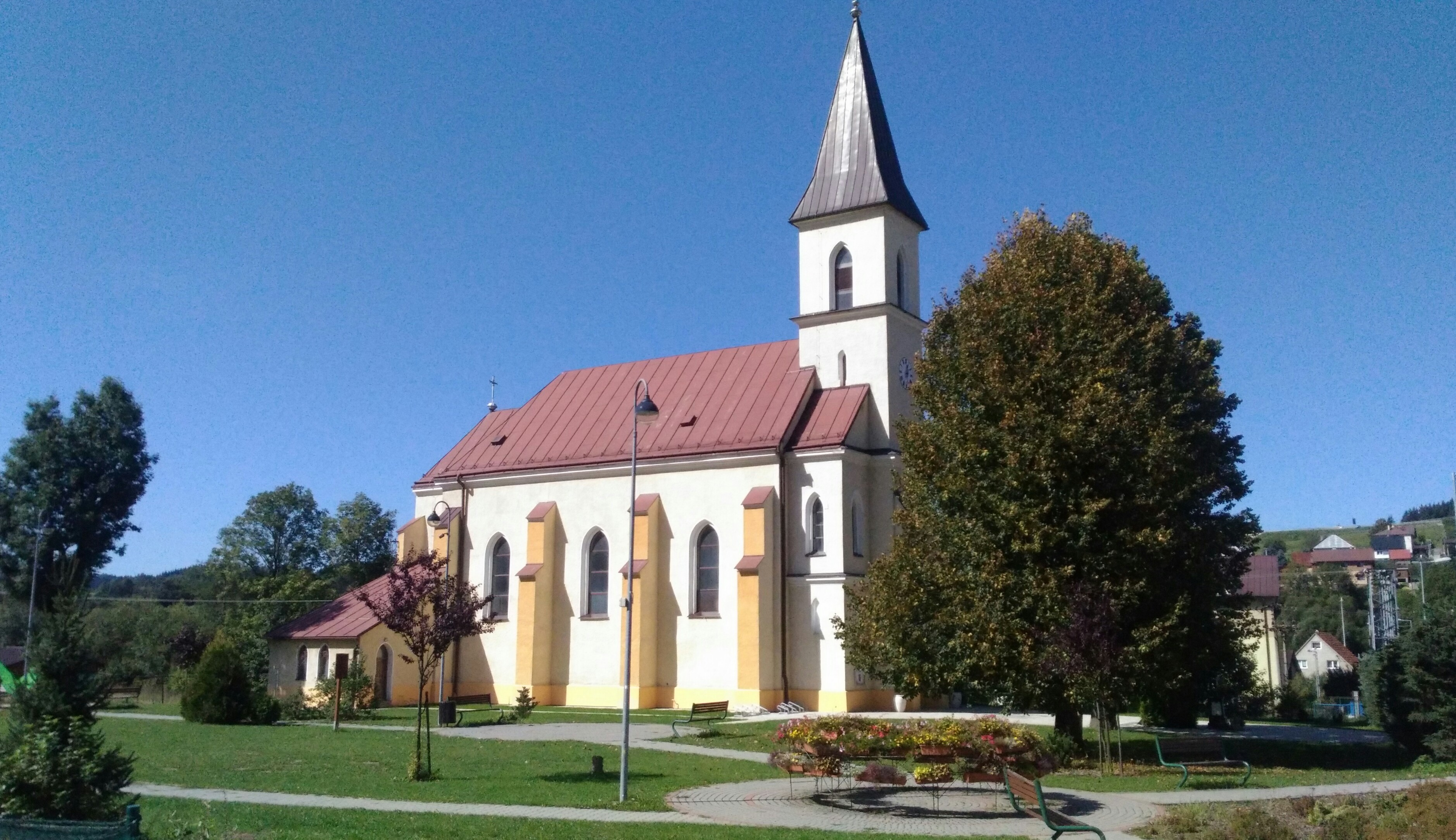

- Flag

- Location of Čierne in the Žilina Region Location of Čierne in Slovakia
- Coordinates: 49.50°N 18.82°E
- Country: Slovakia
- Region: Žilina Region
- District: Čadca District
- First mentioned: 1662

Area
  - Total: 20.84 km^{2} (8.05 sq mi)
- Elevation: 475 m (1,558 ft)

Population (2025)
  - Total: 4,435
- Time zone: UTC+1 (CET)
  - Summer (DST): UTC+2 (CEST)
- Postal code: 231 3
- Area code: +421 41
- Vehicle registration plate (until 2022): CA
- Website: www.obeccierne.sk

Čierne (Hungarian: Cserne) is a village and municipality in Čadca District in the Žilina Region of northern Slovakia, on the border with Poland and the Czech Republic.

== History ==
In historical records the village was first mentioned in 1662.

In November 1938, the village was annexed by the Polish Army, in wake of the annexation of the Trans-Olza region to the Second Polish Republic.

== Geography ==
The municipality lies at an altitude of 475 metres (1,558 ft) and covers an area of 20.84 km^{2} (8.05 sq mi) (2025).

== Population ==
Population statistic (10 years)
Year	1995	2005	2015	2025
Count	4082	4343	4419	4435
Difference		+6.39%	+1.74%	+0.36%

Population statistic
Year	2024	2025
Count	4438	4435
Difference		−0.06%

It has a population of 4435 people (31 December 2025).

=== Ethnicity ===
Census 2021 (1+ %)
Ethnicity	Number	Fraction
Slovak	4323	97.82%
Not found out	84	1.9%
Total	4419	

In year 2021 was 4419 people by ethnicity 4323 as Slovak, 84 as Not found out, 37 as Czech, 7 as Polish, 7 as Other, 6 as Russian, 4 as Italian, 4 as Silesian, 2 as Hungarian, 1 as German and 1 as Greek.

Note on population: The difference values of population numbers in the table "Population statistic" and in the sections "Ethnicity" & "Religion" is caused by the use of various statistical methods.

=== Religion ===
Census 2021 (1+ %)
Religion	Number	Fraction
Roman Catholic Church	4062	91.92%
None	185	4.19%
Not found out	79	1.79%
Total	4419	

In year 2021 was 4419 people by religion 4062 from Roman Catholic Church, 185 from None, 79 from Not found out, 20 from Greek Catholic Church, 14 from Jehovah's Witnesses, 14 from Evangelical Church, 12 from Other and not ascertained christian church, 11 from Christian Congregations in Slovakia, 8 from Calvinist Church, 5 from Other, 3 from Paganism and natural spirituality, 3 from Ad hoc movements, 1 from Eastern Orthodox Church, 1 from Hinduism and 1 from Buddhism.

== Genealogical resources ==
The records for genealogical research are available at the state archive "Statny Archiv in Bytca, Slovakia"

- Roman Catholic church records (births/marriages/deaths): 1742-1918 (parish A)

== See also ==
- List of municipalities and towns in Slovakia
