= Olešná, Čadca District =

Olešná
- Municipality
- Flag

- Location of Olešná in the Žilina Region Location of Olešná in Slovakia
- Coordinates: 49°26′N 18°39′E
- Country: Slovakia
- Region: Žilina Region
- District: Čadca District
- First mentioned: 1619

Area
  - Total: 19.71 km^{2} (7.61 sq mi)
- Elevation: 449 m (1,473 ft)

Population (2025)
  - Total: 1,897
- Time zone: UTC+1 (CET)
  - Summer (DST): UTC+2 (CEST)
- Postal code: 235 2
- Area code: +421 41
- Vehicle registration plate (until 2022): CA
- Website: www.obecolesna.sk/sk/

Olešná (Hungarian: Berekfalu) is a village and municipality in Čadca District in the Žilina Region of northern Slovakia.

== History ==
In historical records the village was first mentioned in 1619.

== Geography ==
The municipality lies at an altitude of 449 metres (1,473 ft) and covers an area of 19.71 km^{2} (7.61 sq mi) (2025).

== Population ==
Population statistic (10 years)
Year	1995	2005	2015	2025
Count	2156	2021	1937	1897
Difference		−6.26%	−4.15%	−2.06%

Population statistic
Year	2024	2025
Count	1890	1897
Difference		+0.37%

It has a population of 1897 people (31 December 2025).

=== Ethnicity ===
Census 2021 (1+ %)
Ethnicity	Number	Fraction
Slovak	1865	96.68%
Not found out	59	3.05%
Czech	29	1.5%
Total	1929	

In year 2021 was 1929 people by ethnicity 1865 as Slovak, 59 as Not found out, 29 as Czech, 4 as Ukrainian, 3 as Polish, 2 as German, 1 as Romani, 1 as Rusyn, 1 as Russian and 1 as Other.

Note on population: The difference values of population numbers in the table "Population statistic" and in the sections "Ethnicity" & "Religion" is caused by the use of various statistical methods.

=== Religion ===
Census 2021 (1+ %)
Religion	Number	Fraction
Roman Catholic Church	1714	88.85%
None	122	6.32%
Not found out	51	2.64%
Total	1929	

In year 2021 was 1929 people by religion 1714 from Roman Catholic Church, 122 from None, 51 from Not found out, 15 from Greek Catholic Church, 9 from Ad hoc movements, 3 from Calvinist Church, 3 from Islam, 3 from Evangelical Church, 2 from Other and not ascertained christian church, 1 from Eastern Orthodox Church, 1 from Christian Congregations in Slovakia, 1 from Other, 1 from Hinduism, 1 from United Methodist Church, 1 from Czechoslovak Hussite Church and 1 from Buddhism.
