= Radôstka =

- Municipality
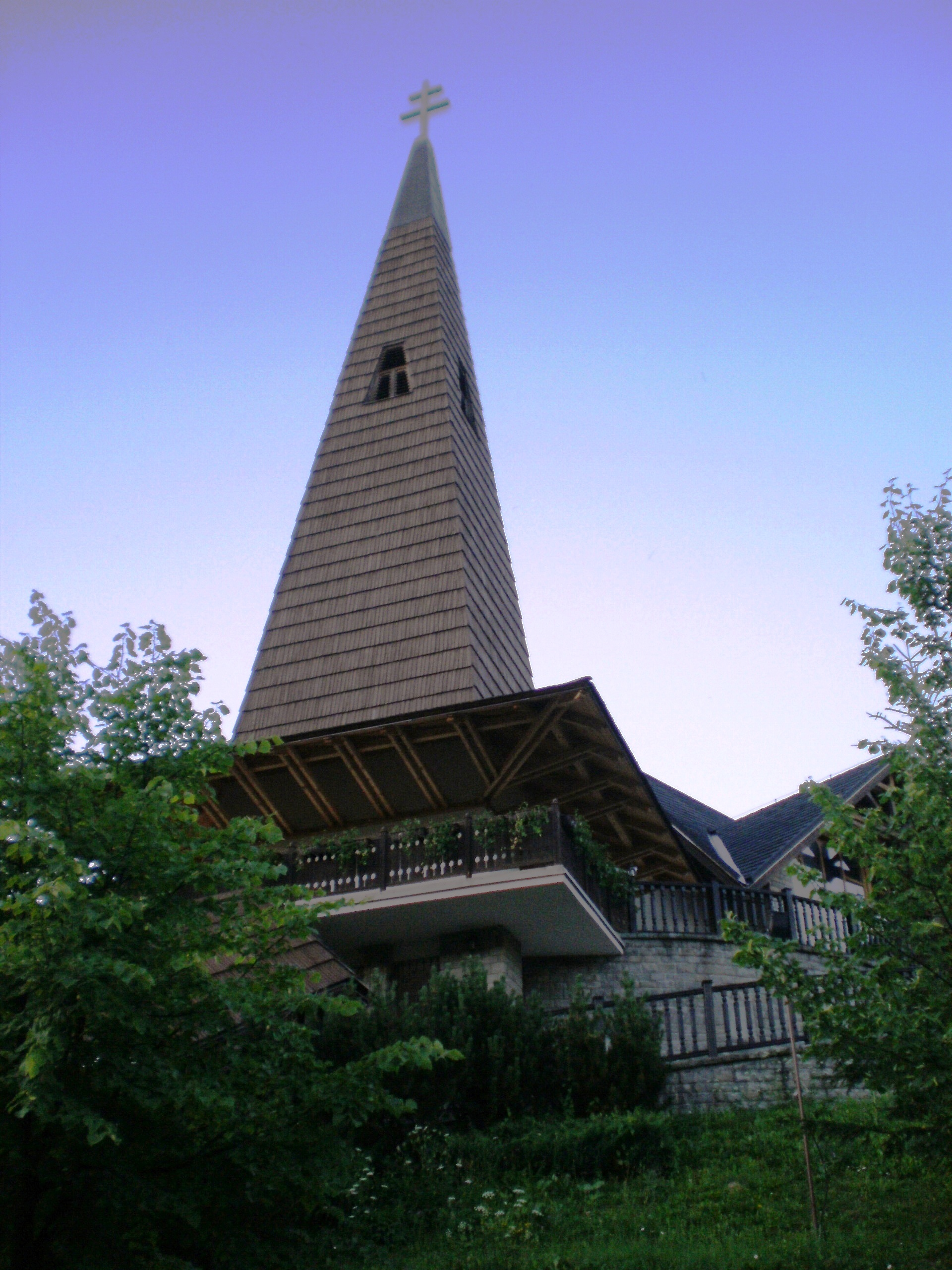

- Flag

- Location of Radôstka in the Žilina Region Location of Radôstka in Slovakia
- Coordinates: 49.33°N 18.95°E
- Country: Slovakia
- Region: Žilina Region
- District: Čadca District
- First mentioned: 1662

Area
  - Total: 13.17 km^{2} (5.08 sq mi)
- Elevation: 501 m (1,644 ft)

Population (2025)
  - Total: 777
- Time zone: UTC+1 (CET)
  - Summer (DST): UTC+2 (CEST)
- Postal code: 230 4
- Area code: +421 41
- Vehicle registration plate (until 2022): CA
- Website: www.radostka.sk

Radôstka (Hungarian: Radoska) is a village and municipality in Čadca District in the Žilina Region of northern Slovakia.

== History ==
In historical records the village was first mentioned in 1662.

== Geography ==
The municipality lies at an altitude of 501 metres (1,644 ft) and covers an area of 13.17 km^{2} (5.08 sq mi) (2025).

== Population ==
Population statistic (10 years)
Year	1995	2005	2015	2025
Count	854	879	827	777
Difference		+2.92%	−5.91%	−6.04%

Population statistic
Year	2024	2025
Count	770	777
Difference		+0.90%

It has a population of 777 people (31 December 2025).

=== Ethnicity ===
Census 2021 (1+ %)
Ethnicity	Number	Fraction
Slovak	788	98.74%
Not found out	10	1.25%
Total	798	

In year 2021 was 798 people by ethnicity 788 as Slovak, 10 as Not found out, 4 as Czech and 1 as Other.

Note on population: The difference values of population numbers in the table "Population statistic" and in the sections "Ethnicity" & "Religion" is caused by the use of various statistical methods.

=== Religion ===
Census 2021 (1+ %)
Religion	Number	Fraction
Roman Catholic Church	737	92.36%
None	38	4.76%
Total	798	

In year 2021 was 798 people by religion 737 from Roman Catholic Church, 38 from None, 7 from Not found out, 5 from Ad hoc movements, 4 from Other and not ascertained christian church, 2 from Christian Congregations in Slovakia, 1 from Calvinist Church, 1 from Eastern Orthodox Church, 1 from Greek Catholic Church, 1 from Evangelical Church and 1 from Buddhism.
