= Dunajov =

Village and municipality in Slovakia

- Municipality
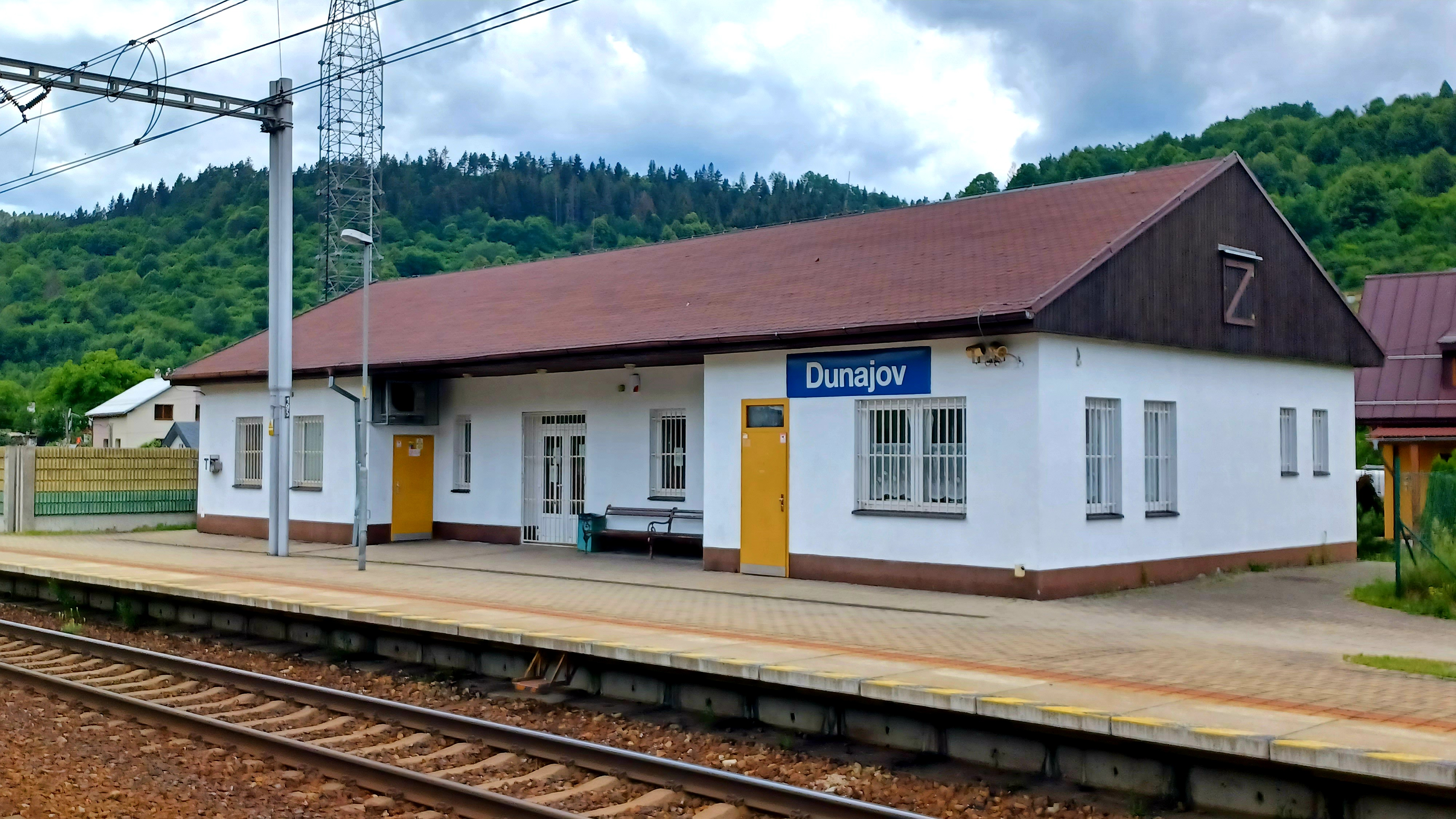

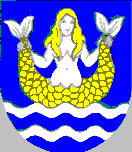
- Flag Coat of arms

- Location of Dunajov in the Žilina Region Location of Dunajov in Slovakia
- Coordinates: 49.37°N 18.82°E
- Country: Slovakia
- Region: Žilina Region
- District: Čadca District
- First mentioned: 1598

Area
  - Total: 6.05 km^{2} (2.34 sq mi)
- Elevation: 378 m (1,240 ft)

Population (2025)
  - Total: 1,113
- Time zone: UTC+1 (CET)
  - Summer (DST): UTC+2 (CEST)
- Postal code: 230 2
- Area code: +421 41
- Vehicle registration plate (until 2022): CA
- Website: www.dunajov.sk/sk/

Dunajov (Hungarian: Dunajó) is a village and municipality in Čadca District in the Žilina Region of northern Slovakia.

== History ==
In historical records the village was first mentioned in 1598.

== Geography ==
The municipality lies at an altitude of 378 metres (1,240 ft) and covers an area of 6.05 km^{2} (2.34 sq mi) (2025).

== Population ==
Population statistic (10 years)
Year	1995	2005	2015	2025
Count	916	907	1180	1113
Difference		−0.98%	+30.09%	−5.67%

Population statistic
Year	2024	2025
Count	1105	1113
Difference		+0.72%

It has a population of 1113 people (31 December 2025).

=== Ethnicity ===
Census 2021 (1+ %)
Ethnicity	Number	Fraction
Slovak	1099	96.74%
Not found out	29	2.55%
Total	1136	

In year 2021 was 1136 people by ethnicity 1099 as Slovak, 29 as Not found out, 7 as Czech, 4 as Ukrainian, 3 as Other, 2 as Turkish, 1 as Jewish, 1 as Vietnamese, 1 as Silesian, 1 as Rusyn, 1 as Polish, 1 as German, 1 as Moravian and 1 as Hungarian.

Note on population: The difference values of population numbers in the table "Population statistic" and in the sections "Ethnicity" & "Religion" is caused by the use of various statistical methods.

=== Religion ===
Census 2021 (1+ %)
Religion	Number	Fraction
Roman Catholic Church	954	83.98%
None	129	11.36%
Not found out	23	2.02%
Total	1136	

In year 2021 was 1136 people by religion 954 from Roman Catholic Church, 129 from None, 23 from Not found out, 8 from Calvinist Church, 5 from Eastern Orthodox Church, 5 from Ad hoc movements, 2 from Islam, 2 from Other, 2 from Buddhism, 1 from Paganism and natural spirituality, 1 from Christian Congregations in Slovakia, 1 from Hinduism, 1 from Greek Catholic Church, 1 from Evangelical Church and 1 from Baptists Church.

== Genealogical resources ==
The records for genealogical research are available at the state archive "Statny Archiv in Bytca, Slovakia"

- Roman Catholic church records (births/marriages/deaths): 1666-1903 (parish B)

== See also ==
- List of municipalities and towns in Slovakia
