= Krásno nad Kysucou =

- Municipality
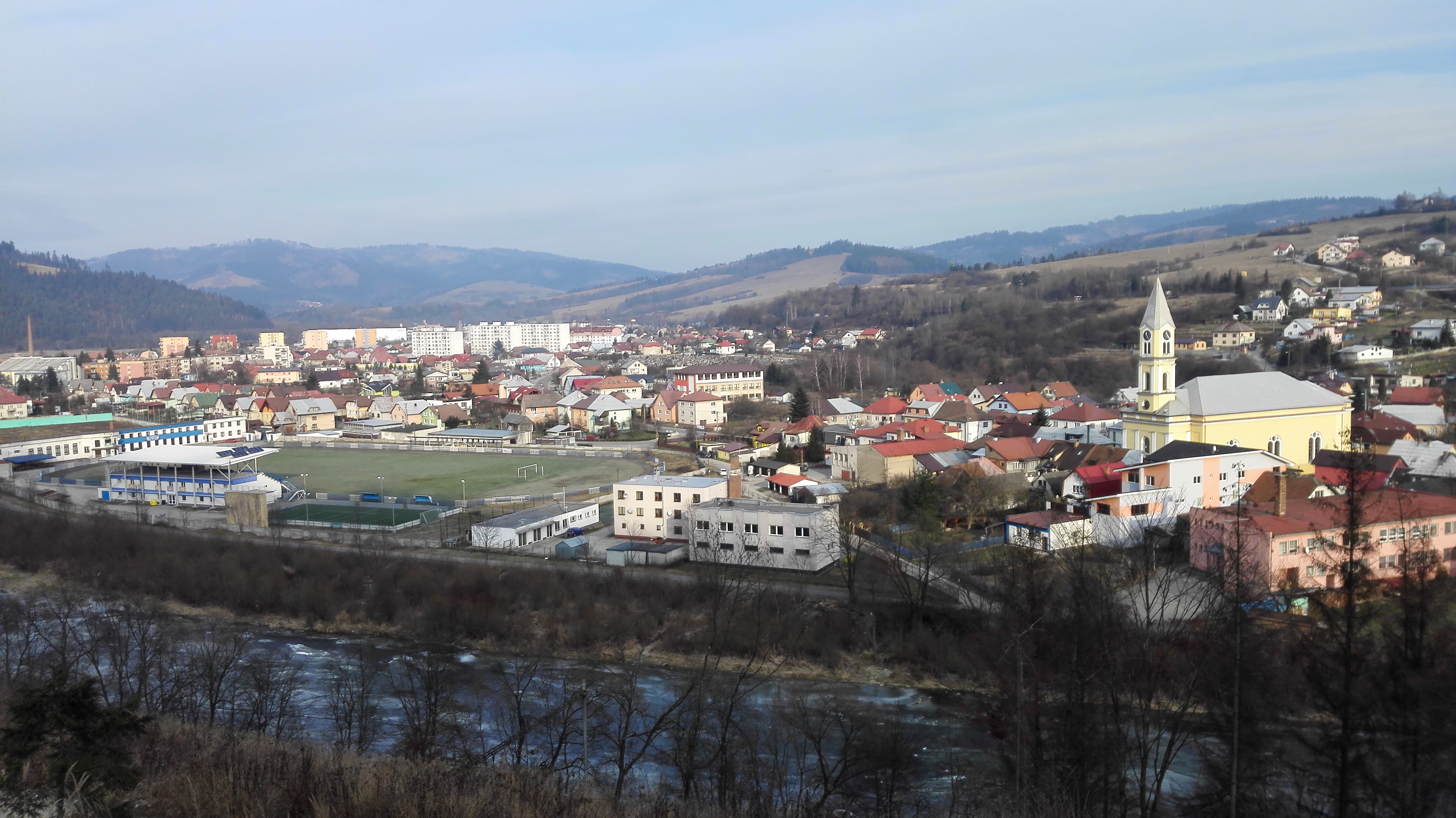

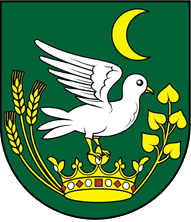
- Flag Coat of arms

- Location of Krásno nad Kysucou in the Žilina Region Location of Krásno nad Kysucou in Slovakia
- Coordinates: 49.39°N 18.83°E
- Country: Slovakia
- Region: Žilina Region
- District: Čadca District
- First mentioned: 1325

Government
  - Mayor: Jozef Grapa

Area
  - Total: 27.75 km^{2} (10.71 sq mi)
- Elevation: 392 m (1,286 ft)

Population (2025)
  - Total: 6,471
- Time zone: UTC+1 (CET)
  - Summer (DST): UTC+2 (CEST)
- Postal code: 230 2
- Area code: +421 41
- Vehicle registration plate (until 2022): CA
- Website: www.mestokrasno.sk

Krásno nad Kysucou (Hungarian: Karásznó) is a town in the Čadca District, Žilina Region, north-western Slovakia. Krásno nad Kysucou is one of the youngest towns in Slovakia (it gained the statute of town on the 1. September 2001). It is an industrial town known for its forest industry. It is the third biggest town in Kysuce Region and it is also known to be the gate to the Bystrická dolina. It has 7038 inhabitants.

== History ==
The first written record about Krásno nad Kysucou was in 1325. At first the village was in the possession of the hereditary reeve of Žilina, then it belonged to the Strečno county.

The First World War together with the Second World War and the Economic Crisis left Krásno, like many other places, in a bad condition. The men, who returned from the front, became extremely angry when they saw that those who had stayed at home during the war, were doing very well. They decided to revenge. The armed plundering was finally stopped by the railmen from Žilina, who were called in by the local Jews. The leader of the plundering died during the first shooting and his companion died on his way to hospital.

== Geography ==
The municipality lies at an altitude of 392 metres (1,286 ft) and covers an area of 27.75 km^{2} (10.71 sq mi) (2025). It lies in the Kysuca river valley.

== Population ==
Population statistic (10 years)
Year	1995	2005	2015	2025
Count	6877	7038	6809	6471
Difference		+2.34%	−3.25%	−4.96%

Population statistic
Year	2024	2025
Count	6506	6471
Difference		−0.53%

It has a population of 6471 people (31 December 2025).

=== Ethnicity ===
Census 2021 (1+ %)
Ethnicity	Number	Fraction
Slovak	6506	97.45%
Not found out	146	2.18%
Total	6676	

In year 2021 was 6676 people by ethnicity 6506 as Slovak, 146 as Not found out, 49 as Czech, 22 as Other, 11 as Serbian, 9 as Russian, 8 as Rusyn, 6 as Ukrainian, 5 as German, 5 as Hungarian, 4 as Italian, 2 as Jewish, 2 as Polish, 2 as English, 1 as Irish, 1 as Romani, 1 as Romanian and 1 as Bulgarian.

Note on population: The difference values of population numbers in the table "Population statistic" and in the sections "Ethnicity" & "Religion" is caused by the use of various statistical methods.

=== Religion ===
Census 2021 (1+ %)
Religion	Number	Fraction
Roman Catholic Church	5905	88.45%
None	468	7.01%
Not found out	151	2.26%
Total	6676	

In year 2021 was 6676 people by religion 5905 from Roman Catholic Church, 468 from None, 151 from Not found out, 29 from Evangelical Church, 27 from Other and not ascertained christian church, 24 from Greek Catholic Church, 19 from Christian Congregations in Slovakia, 14 from Ad hoc movements, 9 from Calvinist Church, 9 from Other, 7 from Eastern Orthodox Church, 4 from Buddhism, 3 from Seventh-day Adventist Church, 2 from Jehovah's Witnesses, 1 from Old Catholic Church, 1 from Paganism and natural spirituality, 1 from Czechoslovak Hussite Church, 1 from Church of Jesus Christ of Latter-day Saints and 1 from Baptists Church.

According to the 2010 census, the town had 6.920 inhabitants with 0.4% Czech as a largest majority. The religious make-up was 91.60% Roman Catholics and 0.13% Lutherans most of others gave no religious affiliation.

== Festivals ==
Gospelové Kysuce (Gospel Kysuce) is an international gospel festival. It takes place every first Friday of September, since 2003. A lot of rock bands that focus on the gospel music are performing here. It starts with the holy mass in the Church of st. Ondrej (which was built in 1861, and it is the biggest church in the Roman Catholic diocese of Žilina).

== Sport ==
16/3 2019 Slovak Bandy Association will organise a new international youth tournament in rink bandy.

== Twin towns – sister cities ==
Krásno nad Kysucou is twinned with:

- Frenštát pod Radhoštěm, Czech Republic
- Metylovice, Czech Republic
- Milówka, Poland
