= Korňa =

- Municipality
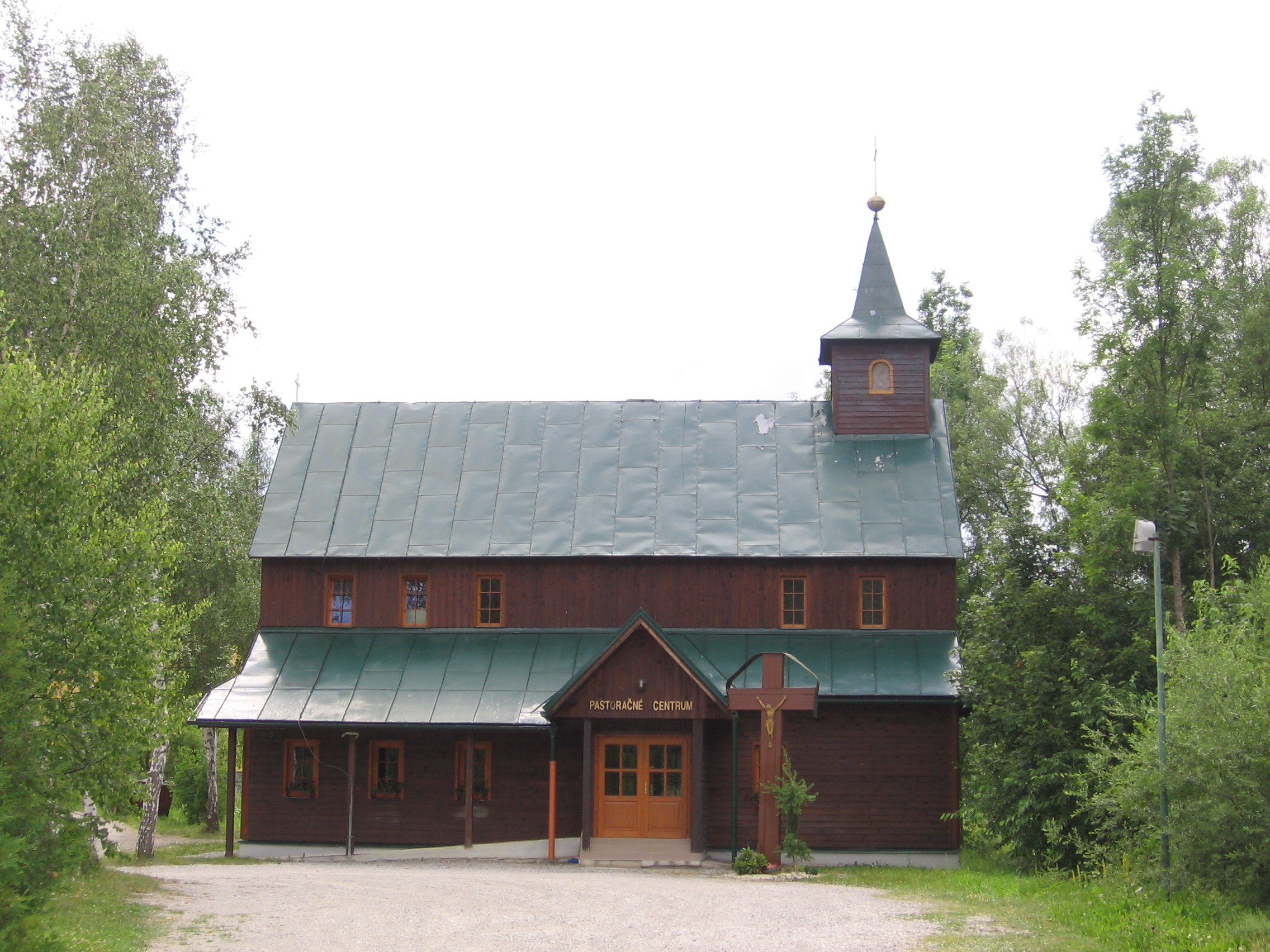
- An old church in Korňa

- Flag

- Location of Korňa in the Žilina Region Location of Korňa in Slovakia
- Coordinates: 49.41°N 18.54°E
- Country: Slovakia
- Region: Žilina Region
- District: Čadca District
- First mentioned: 1954

Government
  - Mayor: Marianna Bebčáková (Ind.)

Area
  - Total: 25.33 km^{2} (9.78 sq mi)
- Elevation: 600 m (2,000 ft)

Population (2025)
  - Total: 2,017
- Time zone: UTC+1 (CET)
  - Summer (DST): UTC+2 (CEST)
- Postal code: 232 1
- Area code: +421 41
- Vehicle registration plate (until 2022): CA
- Website: www.korna.sk/sk/

Korňa (Hungarian: Kornyavölgy) is a village and municipality in Čadca District in the Žilina Region of northern Slovakia.

== Geography ==
The scenic village is situated in the Beskydy Mountains, with the closest town being Turzovka. It is located at 18°32′10″ E, 48°24′42″ N, with an elevation above sea level of 600 m. The cover of the area is 25.33 km^{2}.25.33 It lies close to the Czech and Polish borderlines. Other nearby communities are the villages of Klokočov and Kelčov.

== Climate ==
The typical climate for this mountainous area is relatively cool with large annual rainfall. An abnormal amount of snowfall occurred in the winter of 2005/2006, cutting off this village from the rest of the country, which required the military to help the village be dug out.

== Population ==
Population statistic (10 years)
Year	1995	2005	2015	2025
Count	2348	2221	2069	2017
Difference		−5.40%	−6.84%	−2.51%

Population statistic
Year	2024	2025
Count	2020	2017
Difference		−0.14%

It has a population of 2017 people (31 December 2025).

=== Ethnicity ===
Census 2021 (1+ %)
Ethnicity	Number	Fraction
Slovak	1928	97.32%
Not found out	46	2.32%
Czech	34	1.71%
Total	1981	

In year 2021 was 1981 people by ethnicity 1928 as Slovak, 46 as Not found out, 34 as Czech, 2 as Hungarian, 2 as English, 1 as Italian, 1 as Romanian, 1 as Austrian, 1 as Moravian and 1 as Croatian.

Note on population: The difference values of population numbers in the table "Population statistic" and in the sections "Ethnicity" & "Religion" is caused by the use of various statistical methods.

=== Religion ===
Census 2021 (1+ %)
Religion	Number	Fraction
Roman Catholic Church	1745	88.09%
None	167	8.43%
Not found out	31	1.56%
Total	1981	

In year 2021 was 1981 people by religion 1745 from Roman Catholic Church, 167 from None, 31 from Not found out, 10 from Greek Catholic Church, 6 from Calvinist Church, 6 from Christian Congregations in Slovakia, 5 from Ad hoc movements, 4 from Paganism and natural spirituality, 4 from Evangelical Church, 1 from Eastern Orthodox Church, 1 from Other and 1 from Church of Jesus Christ of Latter-day Saints.

== Territorial division ==
Korňa is unofficially divided into three parts - Korňa I, Korňa II, and Korňa III. Fine segmentation used surnames of original owner/keeper of settlement, for example: U Šprčoka, Zlámaná, U Jendriskov, U Gajdoší, U Ďurkáčí, U Zelenkov, Hrtúsov, Dubačí, Sobčákov, Marcov, and so on. A community centre is situated between the municipal office and local church, where there is also guest-houses, apartments, shops, and pubs.

== Speech ==
The local dialect is a mixture of Slovak, Czech, and Polish loan-words, idioms and terms, drawn from the local - but rarely used now - form of secret language of tinkers craftsmen called "krpoština."

== Building, architecture, attractions, tourism ==
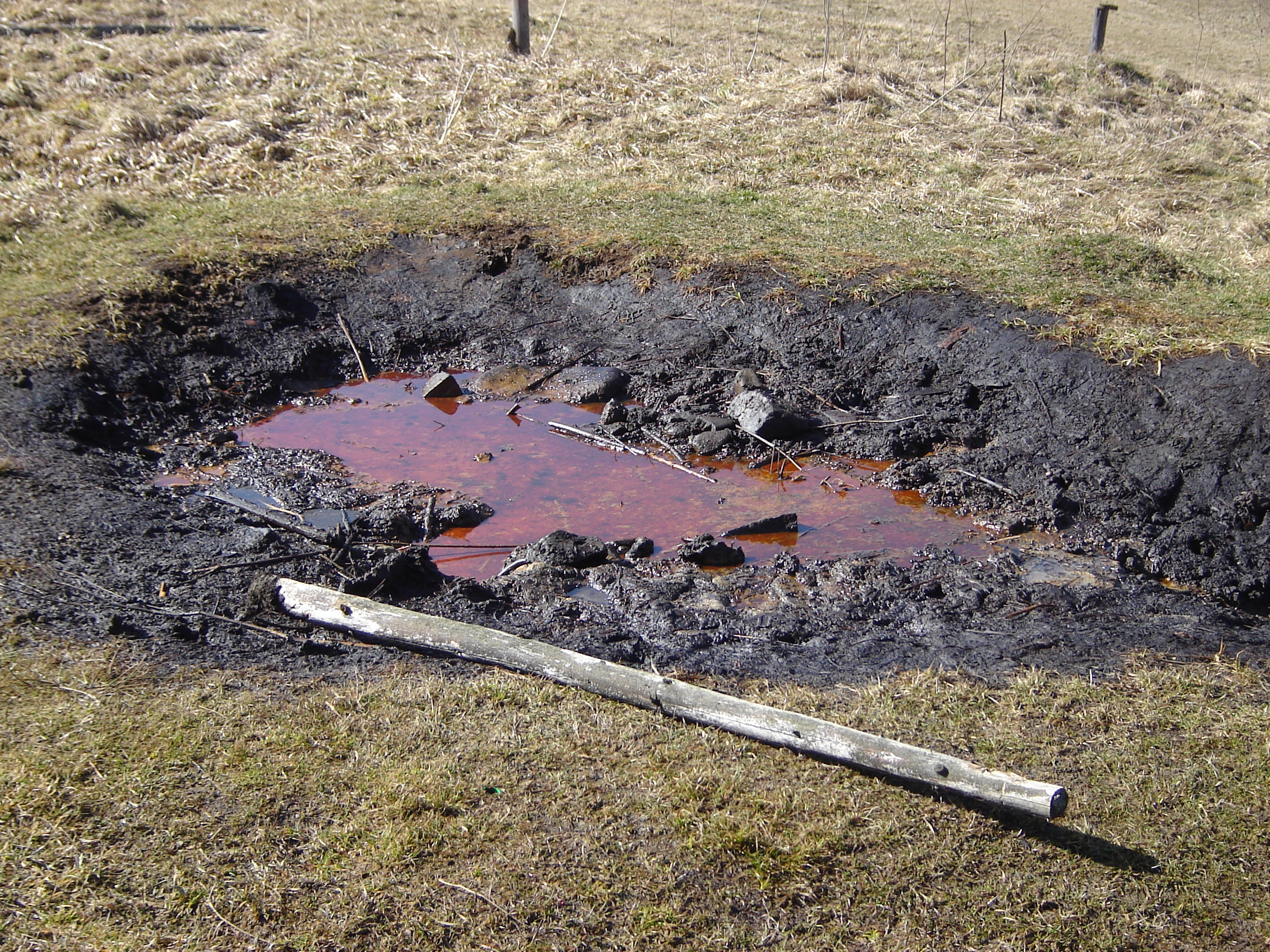
Natural petroleum spring in Korňa

There are two churches - the original wooden church and the new, modern church from 1994. The primary form of dwelling was rustic wooden cottages. The former wooden pub is now in an open-air museum at Vychylovka; the pub still serves its original purpose. A local natural attraction is Korňa's petroleum spring, which is the highest Central European spontaneous petroleum outflow. Citizens have used this petroleum for lighting purposes.

Korňa is also known for the Holy Place on Živčák Hill (Živčákova), where in the past century a local man saw Virgin Mary's apparition. Thousands of people yearly go to this place; it is said the water springs have miraculous effects. In the shrine, regular masses are held. One from entry roads goes across Korňa's Calvary. Korňa, which is surrounded by mountains, is a tourist destination and a mushroom collector's paradise. The village has a perspective of agritourism expansion in the near future. People invest in this area for rusts, cottages and homes.

== Economy and employment ==
In the past this was a poor region, so a lot of citizens moved abroad. Mass migrations primarily occurred during the inter-war period, where they went to the US, and during the post second world war when they went to the Sudetes (for example Krnov). Due to the inhibiting region's development, people became reserve workers, especially for industrial areas at northern Moravia and in the region of Žilina. People often left their homes to find work.

== Transport ==
The hilly terrain gives usually only the opportunity to reach the village using the route of Turzovka - Klokočov. Going from Makov is a possible entrance through the village Kelčov, but parts of the way is forest and off-road is strongly recommended. There is a bus connection from Turzovka to the railroad Čadca - Žilina.

== History ==
Until 1954, Korňa was a borough of the municipality named Turzovka. Turzovka used to be the largest "village" municipality in the entire former Czechoslovakia. Current Korňa was formed by incorporating two boroughs of Lower Korňa (Nižná Korňa) and Upper Korňa (Vyšná Korňa) into a single municipality, currently subdivided into three administrative boroughs.

== Genealogical resources ==
The records for genealogical research are available at the state archive "Statny Archiv in Bytca, Slovakia"

== See also ==
- List of municipalities and towns in Slovakia
