= Dlhá nad Kysucou =

Village and municipality in Slovakia

- Municipality
- Flag

- Location of Dlhá nad Kysucou in the Žilina Region Location of Dlhá nad Kysucou in Slovakia
- Coordinates: 49.39°N 18.64°E
- Country: Slovakia
- Region: Žilina Region
- District: Čadca District
- First mentioned: 1954

Area
  - Total: 12.25 km^{2} (4.73 sq mi)
- Elevation: 537 m (1,762 ft)

Population (2025)
  - Total: 607
- Time zone: UTC+1 (CET)
  - Summer (DST): UTC+2 (CEST)
- Postal code: 235 4
- Area code: +421 41
- Vehicle registration plate (until 2022): CA
- Website: www.dlhanadkysucou.sk

Dlhá nad Kysucou (Hungarian: Dlhavölgy) is a village and municipality in Čadca District in the Žilina Region of northern Slovakia.

== History ==
In historical records the village was first mentioned in 1954.

== Geography ==
The municipality lies at an altitude of 537 metres (1,762 ft) and covers an area of 12.25 km^{2} (4.73 sq mi) (2025).

== Population ==
Population statistic (10 years)
Year	1995	2005	2015	2025
Count	475	508	621	607
Difference		+6.94%	+22.24%	−2.25%

Population statistic
Year	2024	2025
Count	619	607
Difference		−1.93%

It has a population of 607 people (31 December 2025).

=== Ethnicity ===
Census 2021 (1+ %)
Ethnicity	Number	Fraction
Slovak	583	94.18%
Not found out	30	4.84%
Czech	18	2.9%
Total	619	

In year 2021 was 619 people by ethnicity 583 as Slovak, 30 as Not found out, 18 as Czech, 6 as Ukrainian, 1 as Polish and 1 as Hungarian.

Note on population: The difference values of population numbers in the table "Population statistic" and in the sections "Ethnicity" & "Religion" is caused by the use of various statistical methods.

=== Religion ===
Census 2021 (1+ %)
Religion	Number	Fraction
Roman Catholic Church	526	84.98%
None	49	7.92%
Not found out	26	4.2%
Evangelical Church	9	1.45%
Total	619	

In year 2021 was 619 people by religion 526 from Roman Catholic Church, 49 from None, 26 from Not found out, 9 from Evangelical Church, 2 from Eastern Orthodox Church, 2 from Other, 2 from Greek Catholic Church, 1 from Calvinist Church, 1 from Buddhism and 1 from Ad hoc movements.

== Genealogical resources ==
The records for genealogical research are available at the state archive "Statny Archiv in Bytca, Slovakia"

- Roman Catholic church records (births/marriages/deaths): 1716-1896 (parish B)

== See also ==
- List of municipalities and towns in Slovakia
