= Podvysoká =

Village and municipality in Slovakia

- Municipality
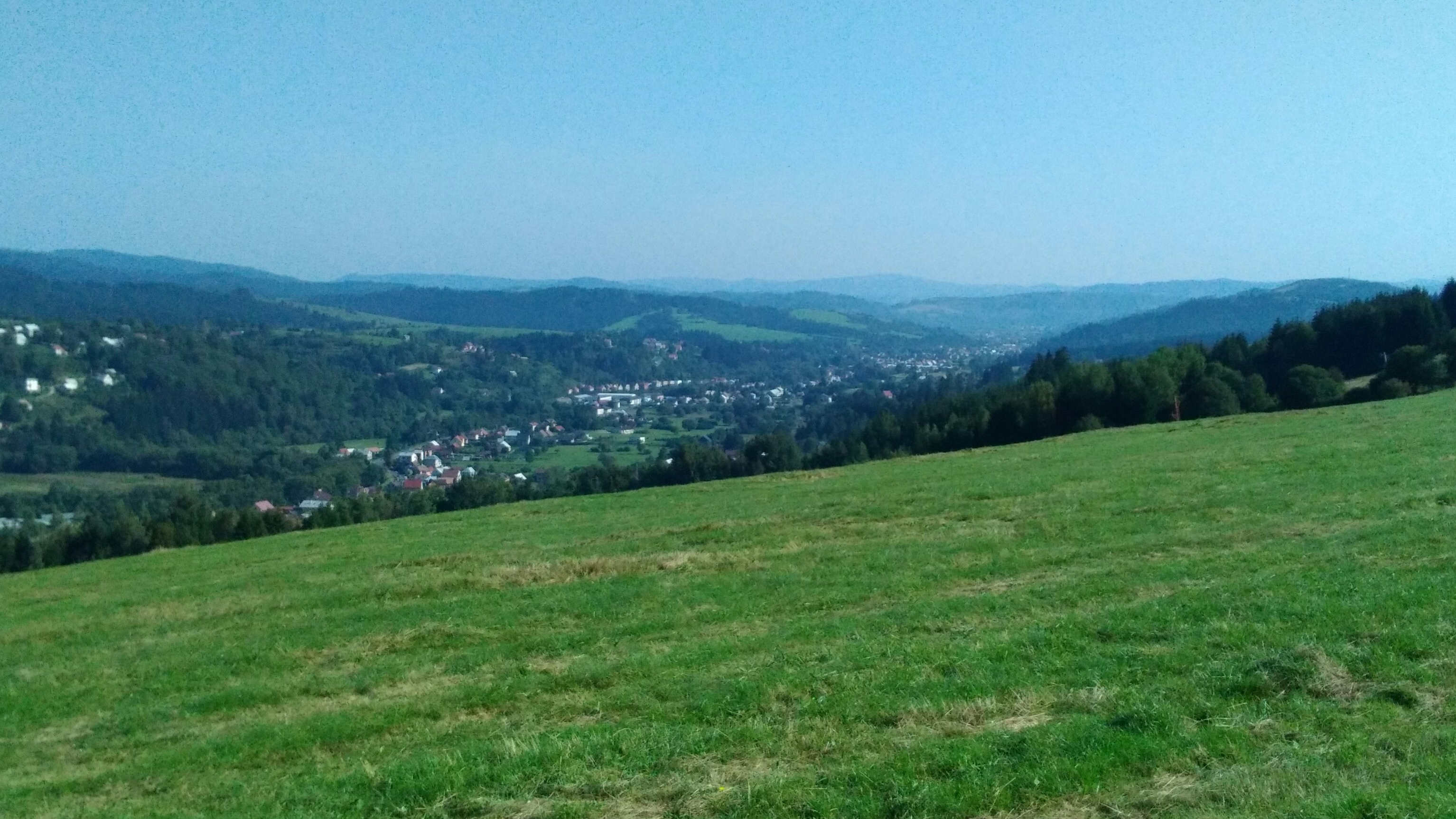

- Flag

- Location of Podvysoká in the Žilina Region Location of Podvysoká in Slovakia
- Coordinates: 49.42°N 18.67°E
- Country: Slovakia
- Region: Žilina Region
- District: Čadca District
- First mentioned: 1658

Area
  - Total: 5.60 km^{2} (2.16 sq mi)
- Elevation: 455 m (1,493 ft)

Population (2025)
  - Total: 1,327
- Time zone: UTC+1 (CET)
  - Summer (DST): UTC+2 (CEST)
- Postal code: 235 3
- Area code: +421 41
- Vehicle registration plate (until 2022): CA
- Website: www.podvysoka.sk

Podvysoká is a village and municipality in Čadca District in the Žilina Region of northern Slovakia.

== History ==
In the village was built in 1658.

== Geography ==
The municipality lies at an altitude of 455 metres (1,493 ft) and covers an area of 5.60 km^{2} (2.16 sq mi) (2025). The village lies near the border with Poland and the Czech Republic

== Population ==
Population statistic (10 years)
Year	1995	2005	2015	2025
Count	1089	1208	1330	1327
Difference		+10.92%	+10.09%	−0.22%

Population statistic
Year	2024	2025
Count	1347	1327
Difference		−1.48%

It has a population of 1327 people (31 December 2025).

=== Ethnicity ===
Census 2021 (1+ %)
Ethnicity	Number	Fraction
Slovak	1310	97.25%
Not found out	35	2.59%
Total	1347	

In year 2021 was 1347 people by ethnicity 1310 as Slovak, 35 as Not found out, 11 as Czech, 6 as Other, 1 as Ukrainian, 1 as Romani and 1 as Romanian.

Note on population: The difference values of population numbers in the table "Population statistic" and in the sections "Ethnicity" & "Religion" is caused by the use of various statistical methods.

=== Religion ===
Census 2021 (1+ %)
Religion	Number	Fraction
Roman Catholic Church	1175	87.23%
None	109	8.09%
Not found out	40	2.97%
Total	1347	

In year 2021 was 1347 people by religion 1175 from Roman Catholic Church, 109 from None, 40 from Not found out, 6 from Evangelical Church, 4 from Christian Congregations in Slovakia, 3 from Paganism and natural spirituality, 2 from Calvinist Church, 2 from Jehovah's Witnesses, 1 from Other and not ascertained christian church, 1 from Islam, 1 from Other, 1 from Greek Catholic Church, 1 from Buddhism and 1 from Ad hoc movements.
