= Zákopčie =

- Municipality
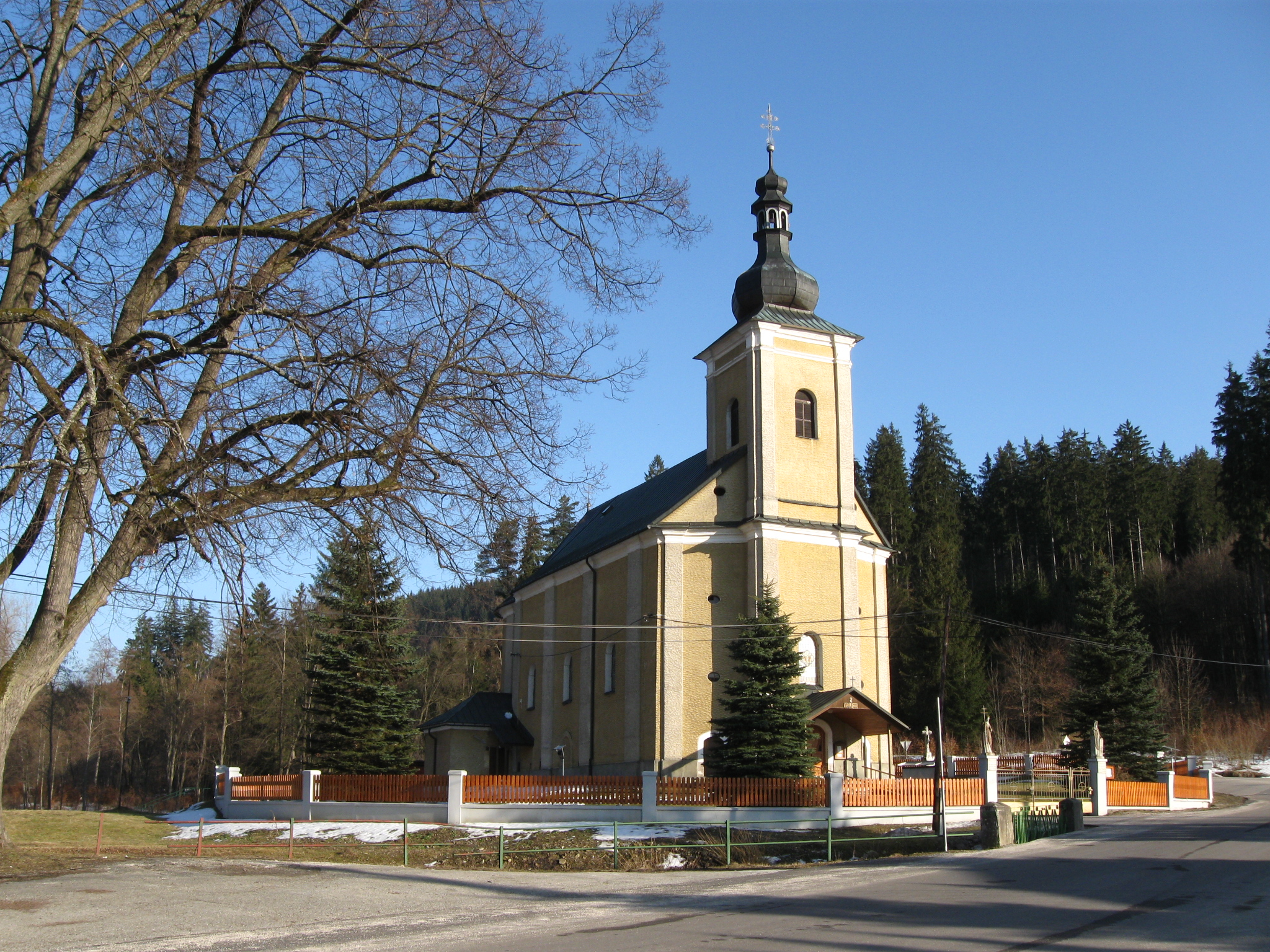

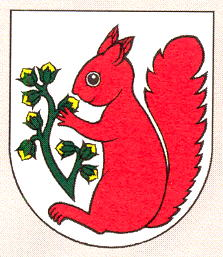
- Flag Coat of arms

- Location of Zákopčie in the Žilina Region Location of Zákopčie in Slovakia
- Coordinates: 49.40°N 18.73°E
- Country: Slovakia
- Region: Žilina Region
- District: Čadca District
- First mentioned: 1662

Area
  - Total: 29.63 km^{2} (11.44 sq mi)
- Elevation: 572 m (1,877 ft)

Population (2025)
  - Total: 1,705
- Time zone: UTC+1 (CET)
  - Summer (DST): UTC+2 (CEST)
- Postal code: 231 1
- Area code: +421 41
- Vehicle registration plate (until 2022): CA
- Website: www.zakopcie.sk

Zákopčie (Hungarian: Dombelve) is a village and municipality in Čadca District in the Žilina Region of northern Slovakia.

The village is a collection of small hamlets spreading through a number of valleys. The main industries are based on wood harvested from the surrounding woods and forests. Farming is also important. There is a post office, village office, a shop, kiosk, a few basic bars, and a florist. There is also a school.

Many people visit the area for holidays and recreation. With a number of people traveling to bigger towns nearby for work.

== History ==
In historical records the village was first mentioned in 1662.

== Geography ==
The municipality lies at an altitude of 572 metres (1,877 ft) and covers an area of 29.63 km^{2} (11.44 sq mi) (2025).

== Population ==
Population statistic (10 years)
Year	1995	2005	2015	2025
Count	1726	1806	1798	1705
Difference		+4.63%	−0.44%	−5.17%

Population statistic
Year	2024	2025
Count	1683	1705
Difference		+1.30%

It has a population of 1705 people (31 December 2025).

=== Ethnicity ===
Census 2021 (1+ %)
Ethnicity	Number	Fraction
Slovak	1656	96.84%
Not found out	49	2.86%
Total	1710	

In year 2021 was 1710 people by ethnicity 1656 as Slovak, 49 as Not found out, 11 as Czech, 3 as Ukrainian, 3 as Other, 2 as Polish, 1 as Romani, 1 as Hungarian and 1 as Greek.

Note on population: The difference values of population numbers in the table "Population statistic" and in the sections "Ethnicity" & "Religion" is caused by the use of various statistical methods.

=== Religion ===
Census 2021 (1+ %)
Religion	Number	Fraction
Roman Catholic Church	1548	90.53%
None	85	4.97%
Not found out	58	3.39%
Total	1710	

In year 2021 was 1710 people by religion 1548 from Roman Catholic Church, 85 from None, 58 from Not found out, 5 from Greek Catholic Church, 3 from Other and not ascertained christian church, 3 from Christian Congregations in Slovakia, 3 from Evangelical Church, 1 from Old Catholic Church, 1 from Eastern Orthodox Church, 1 from Jehovah's Witnesses, 1 from Buddhism and 1 from Ad hoc movements.
