= Kunčice pod Ondřejníkem =

- Municipality
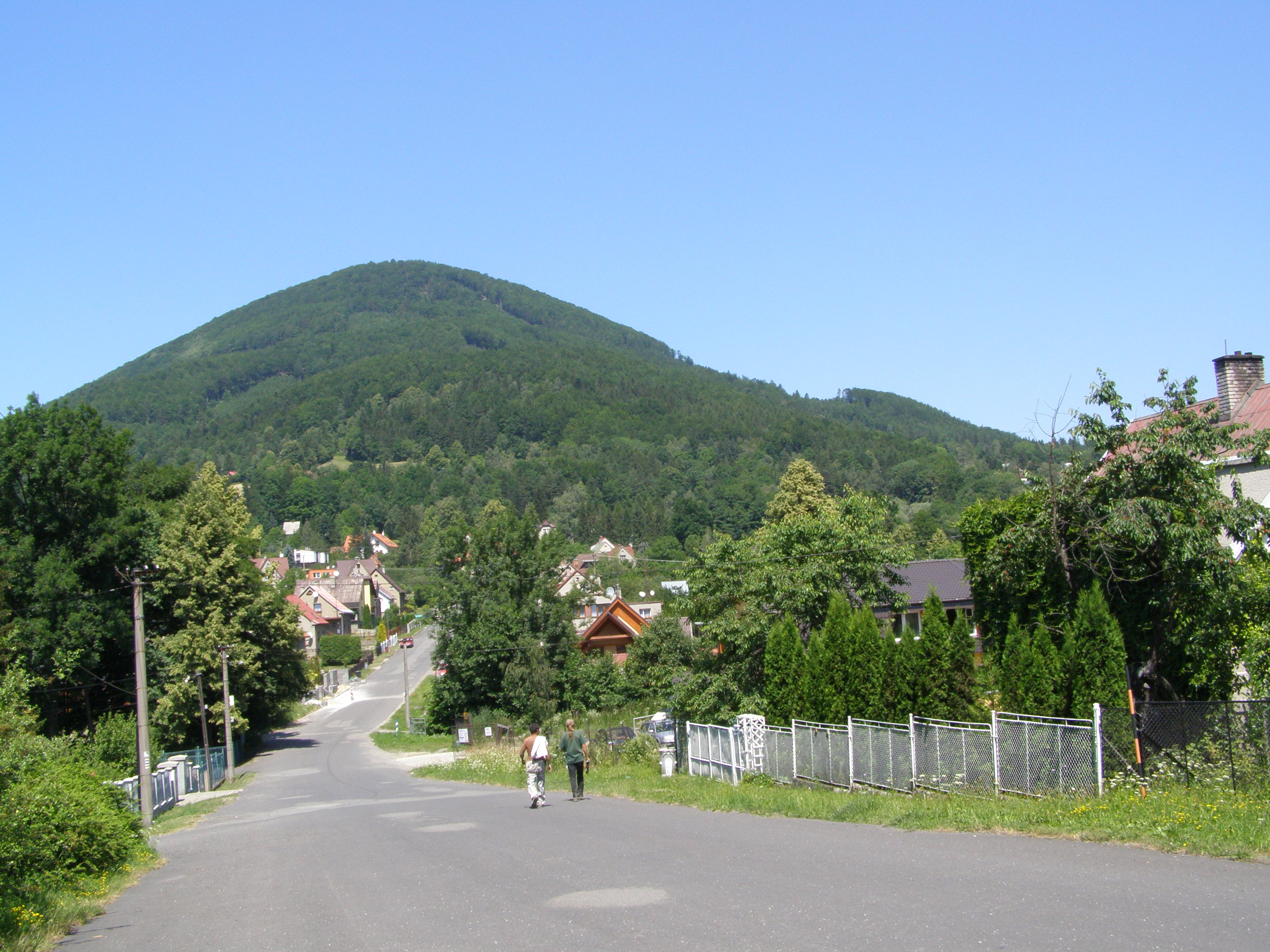
- Kunčice pod Ondřejníkem under the Skalka hill

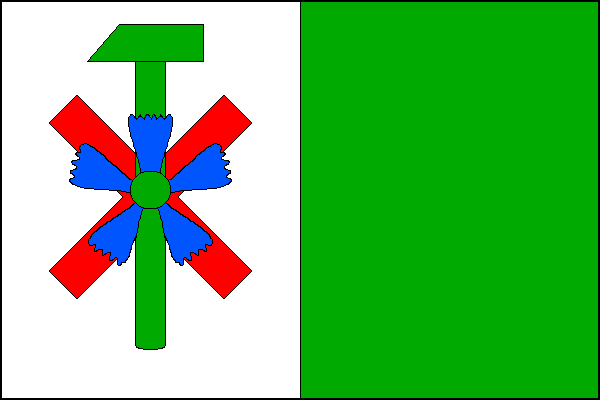
- Flag Coat of arms

- Location in the Czech Republic
- Coordinates: 49°33′2″N 18°15′40″E
- Country: Czech Republic
- Region: Moravian-Silesian
- District: Frýdek-Místek
- First mentioned: 1581

Area
  - Total: 20.20 km^{2} (7.80 sq mi)
- Elevation: 395 m (1,296 ft)

Population (2026-01-01)
  - Total: 2,475
  - Density: 122.5/km^{2} (317.3/sq mi)
- Time zone: UTC+1 (CET)
  - Summer (DST): UTC+2 (CEST)
- Postal code: 739 13
- Website: www.kuncicepo.cz

Kunčice pod Ondřejníkem is a municipality and village in Frýdek-Místek District in the Moravian-Silesian Region of the Czech Republic. It has about 2,500 inhabitants.

== Etymology ==
The name Kunčice is derived from the personal name Kunz. He was an official at Hukvaldy Castle. The village was named Kunčice, then Hrubé Kunčice, from 1848 Velké Kunčice and from 1924 Kunčice pod Ondřejníkem (referring to the nearby Ondřejník massif).

== Geography ==
Kunčice pod Ondřejníkem is located about 15 kilometres (9 mi) southwest of Frýdek-Místek and 28 km (17 mi) south of Ostrava. It lies mostly in the Moravian-Silesian Foothills, only the southern part extends into the Moravian-Silesian Beskids. The highest point is the Skalka mountain at 964 m (3,163 ft) above sea level. The Tichávka Stream originates here and flows across the municipality.

== History ==
The first written mention of Kunčice is from 1581, when there was a glassworks belonging to the Hukvaldy estate. It is considered that the village was founded on the order of Olomouc bishop Dětřich at the beginning of the 14th century. Iron ore was mined here from the 16th century, but the peak of mining did not occur until the 19th century. The railway was built in 1888. In 1911–1915, the first anti-alcohol treatment centre in the Czech lands operated here.

== Demographics ==
Historical population

Year	Pop.	±%
1869	1,549	—
1880	1,684	+8.7%
1890	1,603	−4.8%
1900	1,588	−0.9%
1910	1,829	+15.2%

Year	Pop.	±%
1921	1,894	+3.6%
1930	2,142	+13.1%
1950	2,111	−1.4%
1961	2,353	+11.5%
1970	2,170	−7.8%

Year	Pop.	±%
1980	1,982	−8.7%
1991	1,808	−8.8%
2001	1,962	+8.5%
2011	2,125	+8.3%
2021	2,321	+9.2%

Source: Censuses

== Transport ==
Kunčice pod Ondřejníkem is located on the railway line Valašské Meziříčí–Frýdlant nad Ostravicí.

== Sights ==
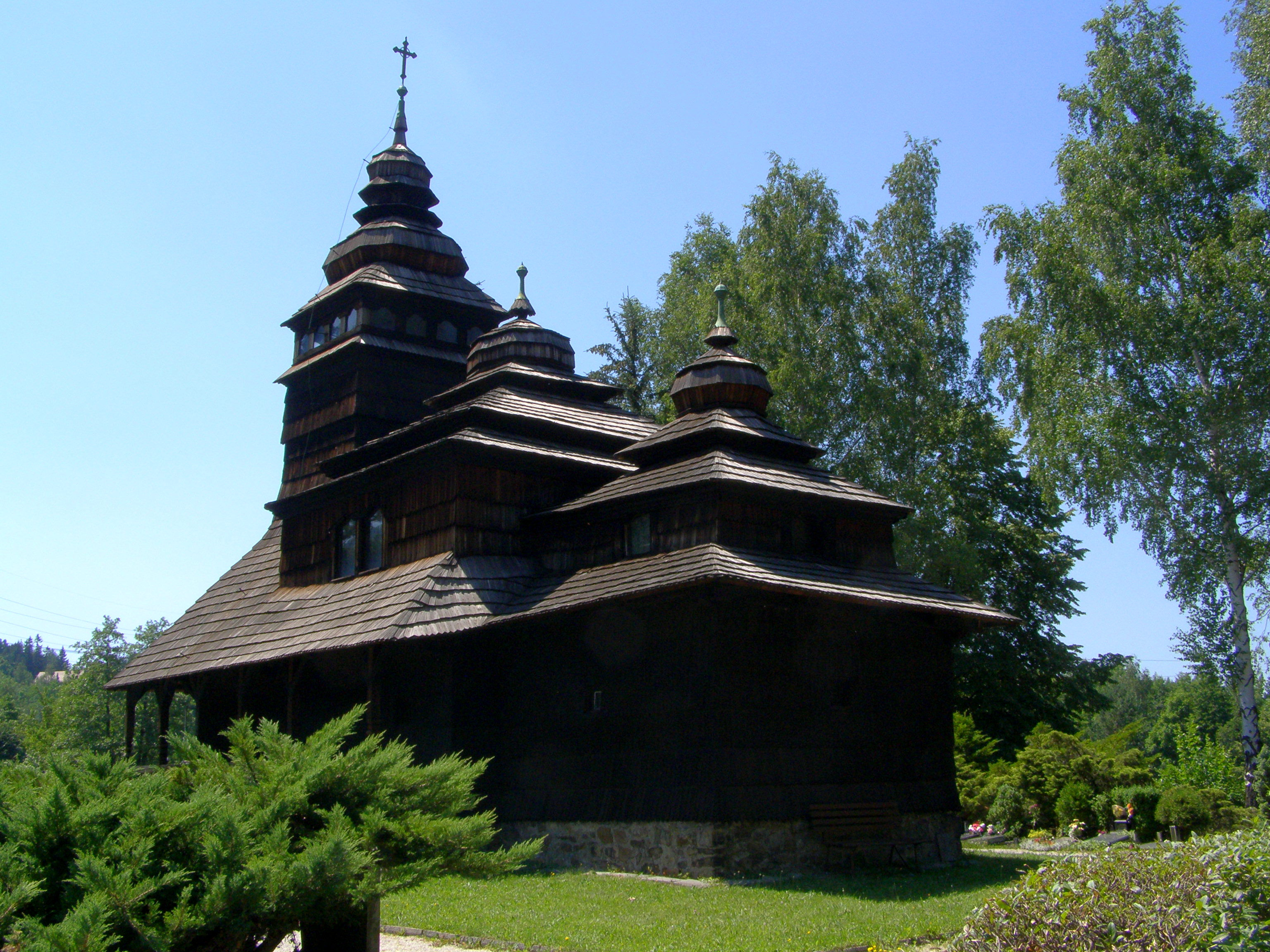
Church of Saints Procopius and Barbara

The most valuable monument of the municipality is the Church of Saints Procopius and Barbara. It is a wooden church from the end of the 17th century. It was relocated here from Subcarpathian Rus in 1931.

The second notable landmark is the Church of Saint Mary Magdalene. It was built in 1812–1814 on the site of an older wooden church. The tower was added in 1854.

== Gallery ==
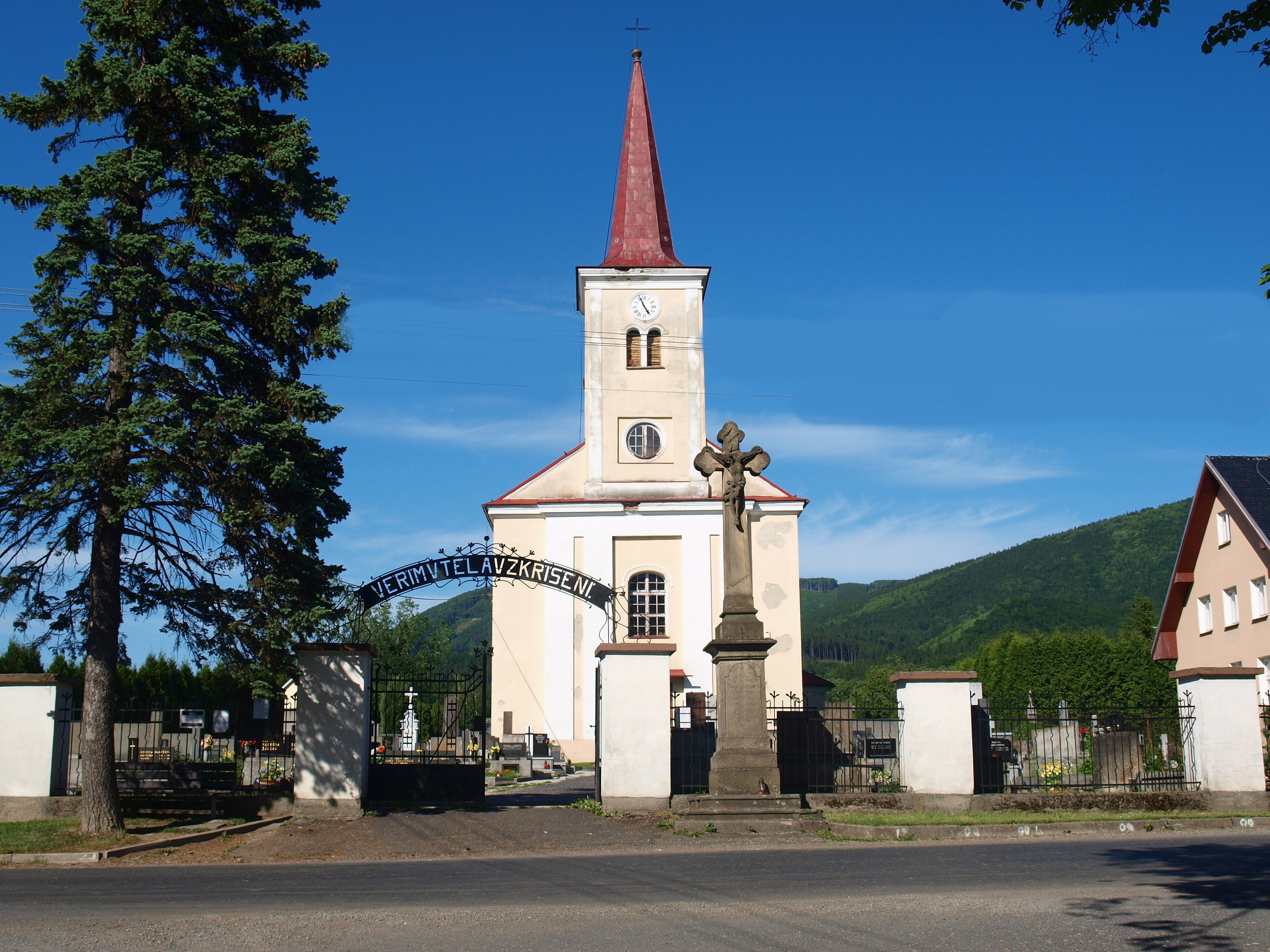
Church of Saint Mary Magdalene

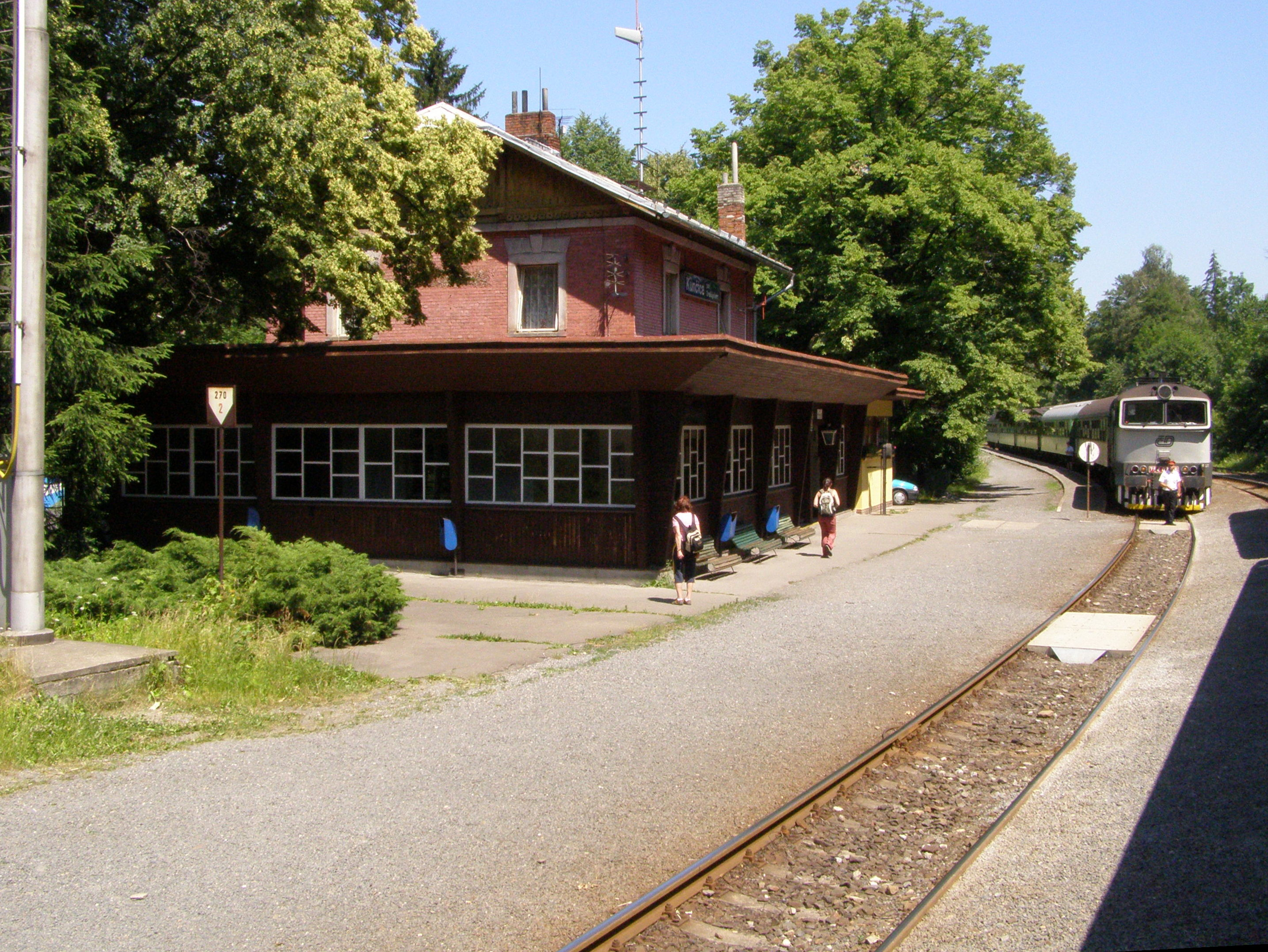
Train station
