= Turzovka =

- Municipality
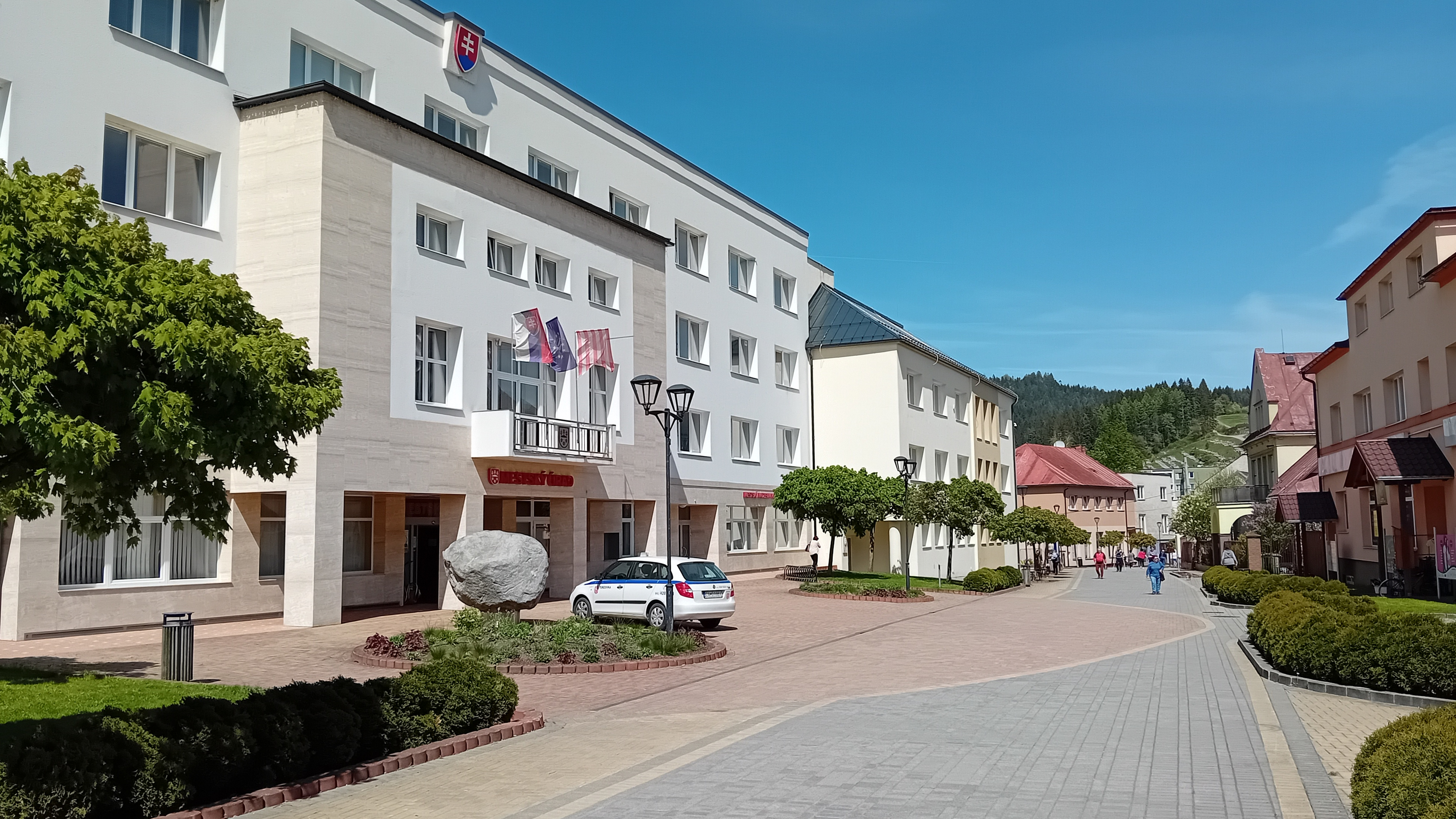

- Flag Coat of arms

- Location of Turzovka in the Žilina Region Location of Turzovka in Slovakia
- Coordinates: 49.40°N 18.62°E
- Country: Slovakia
- Region: Žilina Region
- District: Čadca District
- First mentioned: 1592

Government
  - Mayor: Ľubomír Golis

Area
  - Total: 34.98 km^{2} (13.51 sq mi)
- Elevation: 522 m (1,713 ft)

Population (2025)
  - Total: 6,769
- Time zone: UTC+1 (CET)
  - Summer (DST): UTC+2 (CEST)
- Postal code: 235 4
- Area code: +421 41
- Vehicle registration plate (until 2022): CA
- Website: www.turzovka.sk

Turzovka (Hungarian: Turzófalva) is a town in the Čadca District, Žilina Region in north-western Slovakia.

== History ==
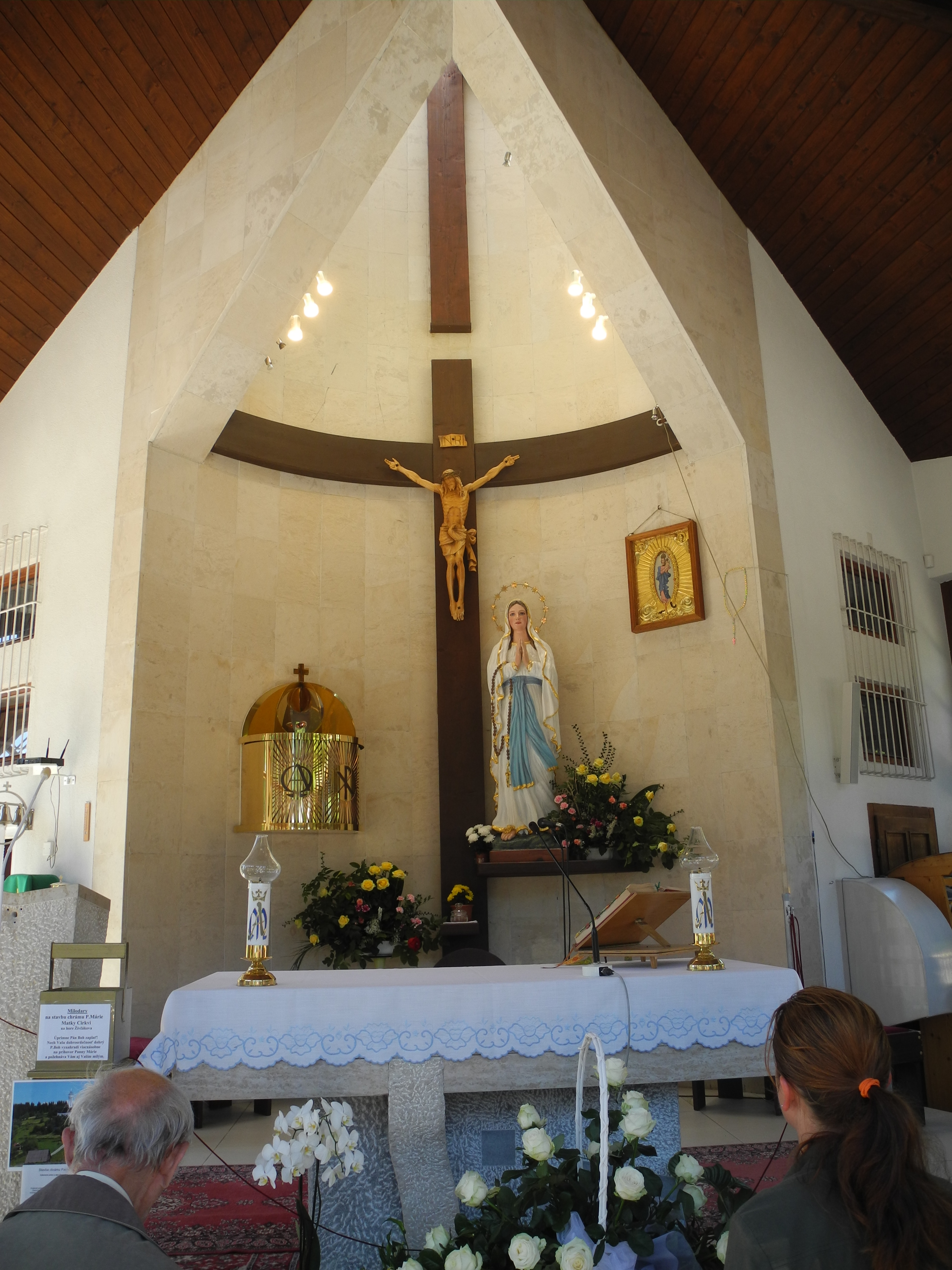
The Marian shrine dedicated to the Turzovka apparitions.

The present-day town was established in 1598 by a palatine of the Thurzó family. It gained town status in 1968.

This town became well known by the Marian apparitions reported by Matúš Lašut between 1958 and 1962.

The town museum was established on October 1, 2015.

== Geography ==
The municipality lies at an altitude of 522 metres (1,713 ft) and covers an area of 34.98 km^{2} (13.51 sq mi) (2025). It lies in the Kysuca river valley, surrounded by the mountain ranges of Beskydy and Javorníky.

== Population ==
Population statistic (10 years)
Year	1995	2005	2015	2025
Count	7646	7785	7640	6769
Difference		+1.81%	−1.86%	−11.40%

Population statistic
Year	2024	2025
Count	6853	6769
Difference		−1.22%

It has a population of 6769 people (31 December 2025).

=== Ethnicity ===
Census 2021 (1+ %)
Ethnicity	Number	Fraction
Slovak	6715	92.83%
Not found out	443	6.12%
Czech	78	1.07%
Total	7233	

In year 2021 was 7233 people by ethnicity 6715 as Slovak, 443 as Not found out, 78 as Czech, 69 as Romani, 10 as Russian, 9 as Polish, 6 as Other, 5 as Ukrainian, 4 as Hungarian, 3 as Albanian, 2 as Irish, 2 as Rusyn, 2 as English, 1 as Jewish, 1 as Italian, 1 as Serbian, 1 as Silesian, 1 as Romanian, 1 as German, 1 as Moravian, 1 as Greek and 1 as Croatian.

Note on population: The difference values of population numbers in the table "Population statistic" and in the sections "Ethnicity" & "Religion" is caused by the use of various statistical methods.

=== Religion ===
Census 2021 (1+ %)
Religion	Number	Fraction
Roman Catholic Church	5981	82.69%
None	578	7.99%
Not found out	484	6.69%
Total	7233	

In year 2021 was 7233 people by religion 5981 from Roman Catholic Church, 578 from None, 484 from Not found out, 35 from Greek Catholic Church, 31 from Evangelical Church, 28 from Christian Congregations in Slovakia, 26 from Ad hoc movements, 19 from Calvinist Church, 15 from Other, 9 from Other and not ascertained christian church, 8 from Eastern Orthodox Church, 8 from Paganism and natural spirituality, 3 from Buddhism, 2 from Old Catholic Church, 2 from Jehovah's Witnesses, 2 from Czechoslovak Hussite Church, 1 from Islam and 1 from Apostolic Church.

According to the 2010 census, the town had 7,802 inhabitants. The largest minority group were Czech 0.75% and Roma 0.27%. The religious make-up was 92.74% Roman Catholics and 0.2% Lutherans, most of the others giving no affiliation.

== Notable people ==
- Ladislav Polka (1952–2025), politician

== Twin towns — sister cities ==
Turzovka is twinned with:

- Frýdlant nad Ostravicí, Czech Republic
- Győrújbarát, Hungary
- Kęty, Poland
