= Vysoká nad Kysucou =

Village and municipality in Slovakia

- Municipality
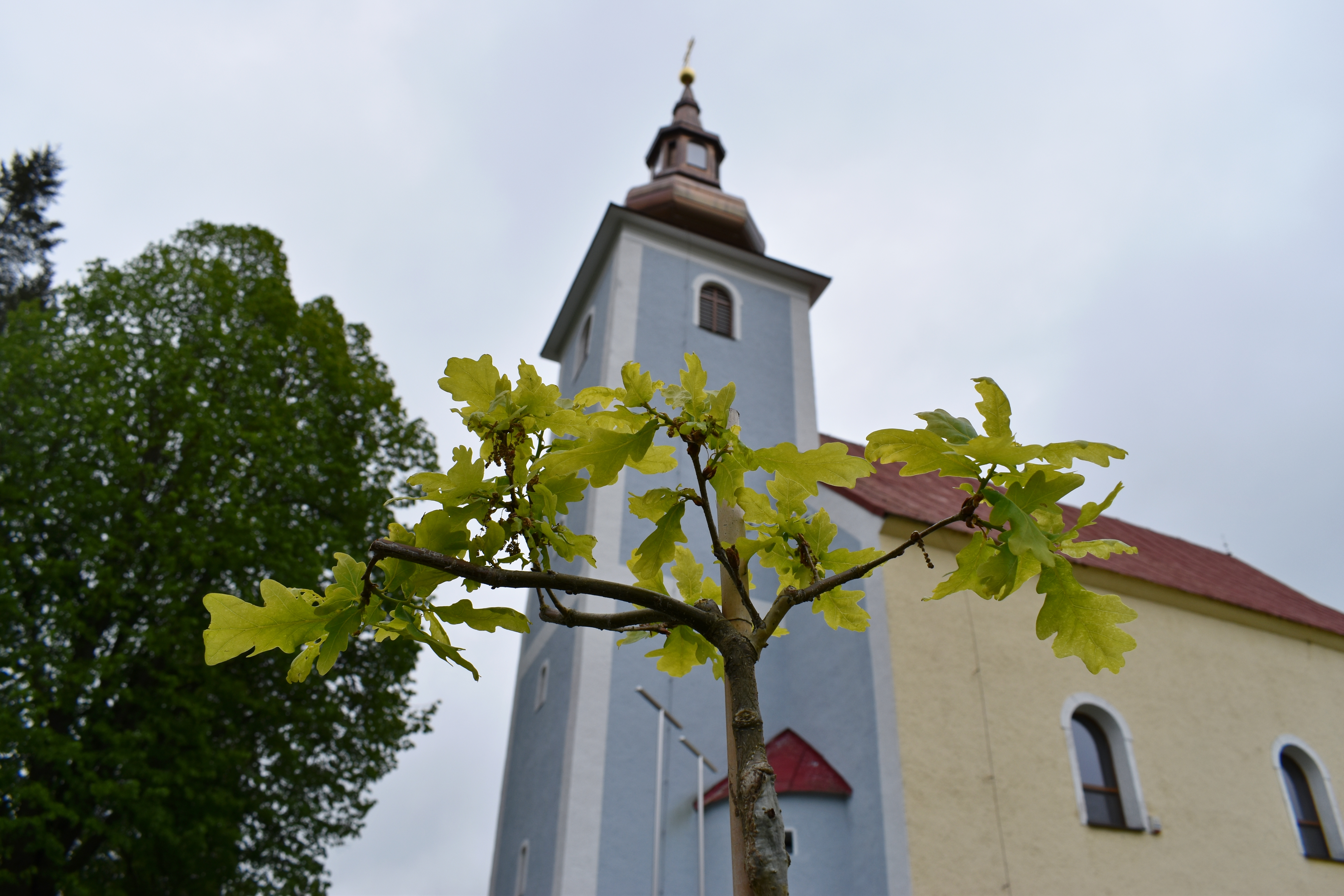

- Flag

- Location of Vysoká nad Kysucou in the Žilina Region Location of Vysoká nad Kysucou in Slovakia
- Coordinates: 49.38°N 18.55°E
- Country: Slovakia
- Region: Žilina Region
- District: Čadca District
- First mentioned: 1619

Area
  - Total: 43.87 km^{2} (16.94 sq mi)
- Elevation: 688 m (2,257 ft)

Population (2025)
  - Total: 2,426
- Time zone: UTC+1 (CET)
  - Summer (DST): UTC+2 (CEST)
- Postal code: 235 5
- Area code: +421 41
- Vehicle registration plate (until 2022): CA
- Website: www.vysokanadkysucou.sk/sk/

Vysoká nad Kysucou (Hungarian: Hegyeshely) is a village and municipality in Čadca District in the Žilina Region of northern Slovakia.

== History ==
In historical records the village was first mentioned in 1619.

== Geography ==
The municipality lies at an altitude of 688 metres (2,257 ft) and covers an area of 43.87 km^{2} (16.94 sq mi) (2025).

== Population ==
Population statistic (10 years)
Year	1995	2005	2015	2025
Count	3128	2963	2697	2426
Difference		−5.27%	−8.97%	−10.04%

Population statistic
Year	2024	2025
Count	2437	2426
Difference		−0.45%

It has a population of 2426 people (31 December 2025).

=== Ethnicity ===
Census 2021 (1+ %)
Ethnicity	Number	Fraction
Slovak	2469	95.77%
Not found out	100	3.87%
Czech	30	1.16%
Total	2578	

In year 2021 was 2578 people by ethnicity 2469 as Slovak, 100 as Not found out, 30 as Czech, 20 as Romani, 4 as Russian, 3 as Hungarian, 2 as Rusyn, 2 as German, 2 as Other, 1 as Austrian and 1 as Polish.

Note on population: The difference values of population numbers in the table "Population statistic" and in the sections "Ethnicity" & "Religion" is caused by the use of various statistical methods.

=== Religion ===
Census 2021 (1+ %)
Religion	Number	Fraction
Roman Catholic Church	2234	86.66%
None	147	5.7%
Not found out	107	4.15%
Total	2578	

In year 2021 was 2578 people by religion 2234 from Roman Catholic Church, 147 from None, 107 from Not found out, 22 from Greek Catholic Church, 21 from Christian Congregations in Slovakia, 18 from Evangelical Church, 10 from Calvinist Church, 8 from Ad hoc movements, 4 from Other, 3 from Jehovah's Witnesses, 1 from Eastern Orthodox Church, 1 from Paganism and natural spirituality, 1 from Other and not ascertained christian church and 1 from Buddhism.
