= Čadca District =

Coordinates: 49°26′17″N 18°47′23″E

- District
- Country: Slovakia
- Region (kraj): Žilina Region
- Cultural region: Kysuce
- Seat: Čadca

Area
  - Total: 760.61 km^{2} (293.67 sq mi)

Population (2025)
  - Total: 86,104
- Time zone: UTC+1 (CET)
  - Summer (DST): UTC+2 (CEST)
- Telephone prefix: 041
- Vehicle registration plate (until 2022): CA
- Municipalities: 23

Čadca District (okres Čadca) is a district in the Žilina Region of northern central Slovakia, in the Kysuce region. It had been established in 1923 and the current borders exist from 1996. Forest covers 58% of the district area. It is one of the populous Slovak district, population density is above Slovak average. Economy basis is performed by engineering, metal and wood processing industry. In the district are several winter and skiing resorts, foremost Oščadnica and Makov. Administrative seat is the town of Čadca, however, many locals daily travel to Žilina for work, shopping, or education.

== Population ==
Population statistic (10 years)
Year	1995	2005	2015	2025
Count	91,891	92,791	90,960	86,104
Difference		+0.97%	−1.97%	−5.33%

Population statistic
Year	2024	2025
Count	86,666	86,104
Difference		−0.64%

It has a population of 86,104 people (31 December 2025).

Historical population
Year	Pop.	±%
1970	84,689	—
1980	88,760	+4.8%
1991	89,860	+1.2%
2001	92,843	+3.3%
2011	91,710	−1.2%
2021	88,642	−3.3%
Source: Statistical Office of the Slovak Republic

=== Ethnicity ===
Census 2021 (1+ %)
Ethnicity	Number	Fraction
Slovak	84,685	94.01%
Not found out	3624	4.02%
Czech	922	1.02%
Total	90,077	

In year 2021 was 90,077 people by ethnicity 84,685 as Slovak, 3624 as Not found out, 922 as Czech, 155 as Other, 125 as Romani, 100 as Russian, 95 as Polish, 64 as Ukrainian, 50 as Hungarian, 47 as German, 30 as Rusyn, 25 as Italian, 17 as Serbian, 16 as Moravian, 15 as English, 14 as Vietnamese, 10 as Chinese, 10 as Silesian, 9 as Jewish, 9 as Irish, 8 as Canadian, 7 as Romanian, 7 as Greek, 7 as Bulgarian, 6 as Austrian, 5 as Croatian, 5 as Albanian, 4 as French, 3 as Korean, 2 as Turkish and 1 as Iranian.

Note on population: The difference values of population numbers in the table "Population statistic" and in the sections "Ethnicity" & "Religion" is caused by the use of various statistical methods.

=== Religion ===
Census 2021 (1+ %)
Religion	Number	Fraction
Roman Catholic Church	76,267	86.04%
None	6645	7.5%
Not found out	3583	4.04%
Total	88,642	

In year 2021 was 88,642 people by religion 76,267 from Roman Catholic Church, 6645 from None, 3583 from Not found out, 381 from Greek Catholic Church, 361 from Evangelical Church, 314 from Christian Congregations in Slovakia, 215 from Ad hoc movements, 162 from Other and not ascertained christian church, 156 from Other, 126 from Calvinist Church, 114 from Jehovah's Witnesses, 67 from Eastern Orthodox Church, 64 from Buddhism, 59 from Paganism and natural spirituality, 25 from Old Catholic Church, 19 from Seventh-day Adventist Church, 18 from Islam, 17 from Apostolic Church, 12 from Hinduism, 9 from Church of Jesus Christ of Latter-day Saints, 8 from Czechoslovak Hussite Church, 6 from Jewish community, 5 from Baptists Church, 4 from New Apostolic Church, 4 from United Methodist Church and 1 from Bahá'i Community.

== Municipalities ==
Municipality	Area [km^{2}]	Population
Čadca	56.76	22,072
Čierne	20.84	4,435
Dlhá nad Kysucou	12.25	607
Dunajov	6.05	1,113
Klokočov	51.15	2,201
Klubina	15.57	556
Korňa	25.33	2,017
Krásno nad Kysucou	27.75	6,471
Makov	46.06	1,652
Nová Bystrica	125.26	2,557
Olešná	19.71	1,897
Oščadnica	58.63	5,780
Podvysoká	5.60	1,327
Radôstka	13.17	777
Raková	41.51	5,577
Skalité	33.16	5,211
Stará Bystrica	36.90	2,810
Staškov	21.85	2,754
Svrčinovec	15.73	3,252
Turzovka	34.98	6,769
Vysoká nad Kysucou	43.87	2,426
Zákopčie	29.63	1,705
Zborov nad Bystricou	18.70	2,138

Population and area values are current for year 2025.
