= Klokočov, Čadca District =

Klokočov
- Municipality
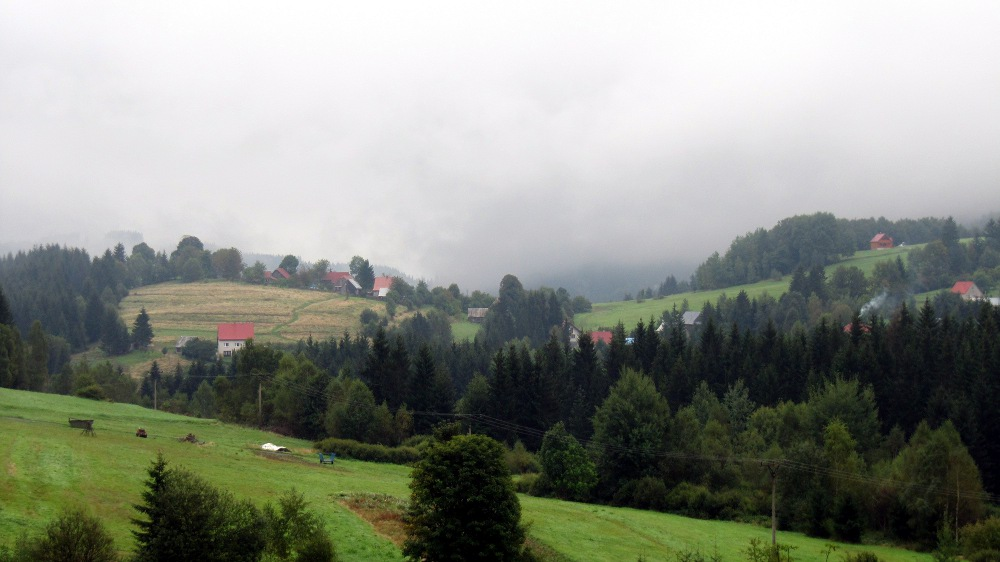

- Flag

- Location of Klokočov in the Žilina Region Location of Klokočov in Slovakia
- Coordinates: 49.45°N 18.571111°E
- Country: Slovakia
- Region: Žilina Region
- District: Čadca District
- First mentioned: 1954

Area
  - Total: 51.15 km^{2} (19.75 sq mi)
- Elevation: 622 m (2,041 ft)

Population (2025)
  - Total: 2,201
- Time zone: UTC+1 (CET)
  - Summer (DST): UTC+2 (CEST)
- Postal code: 232 2
- Area code: +421 41
- Vehicle registration plate (until 2022): CA
- Website: www.klokocov.sk

Klokočov (Hungarian: Klokocsóvölgy) is a village and municipality in Čadca District in the Žilina Region of northern Slovakia.

== History ==
In the village was created in 1954 by the split of the biggest municipality Turzovka into several smaller villages.

== Geography ==
The municipality lies at an altitude of 622 metres (2,041 ft) and covers an area of 51.15 km^{2} (19.75 sq mi) (2025).

== Population ==
Population statistic (10 years)
Year	1995	2005	2015	2025
Count	2889	2609	2321	2201
Difference		−9.69%	−11.03%	−5.17%

Population statistic
Year	2024	2025
Count	2202	2201
Difference		−0.04%

It has a population of 2201 people (31 December 2025).

=== Ethnicity ===
Census 2021 (1+ %)
Ethnicity	Number	Fraction
Slovak	2183	95.45%
Not found out	79	3.45%
Czech	75	3.27%
Total	2287	

In year 2021 was 2287 people by ethnicity 2183 as Slovak, 79 as Not found out, 75 as Czech, 5 as German, 2 as Other, 1 as Rusyn, 1 as Polish, 1 as Moravian and 1 as Hungarian.

Note on population: The difference values of population numbers in the table "Population statistic" and in the sections "Ethnicity" & "Religion" is caused by the use of various statistical methods.

=== Religion ===
Census 2021 (1+ %)
Religion	Number	Fraction
Roman Catholic Church	2010	87.89%
None	164	7.17%
Not found out	82	3.59%
Total	2287	

In year 2021 was 2287 people by religion 2010 from Roman Catholic Church, 164 from None, 82 from Not found out, 6 from Christian Congregations in Slovakia, 6 from Evangelical Church, 3 from Greek Catholic Church, 3 from Ad hoc movements, 2 from Calvinist Church, 2 from Jehovah's Witnesses, 2 from Hinduism, 2 from Church of Jesus Christ of Latter-day Saints, 1 from Old Catholic Church, 1 from Eastern Orthodox Church, 1 from Other, 1 from Seventh-day Adventist Church and 1 from Buddhism.
