= Makov, Čadca District =

Makov
- Municipality
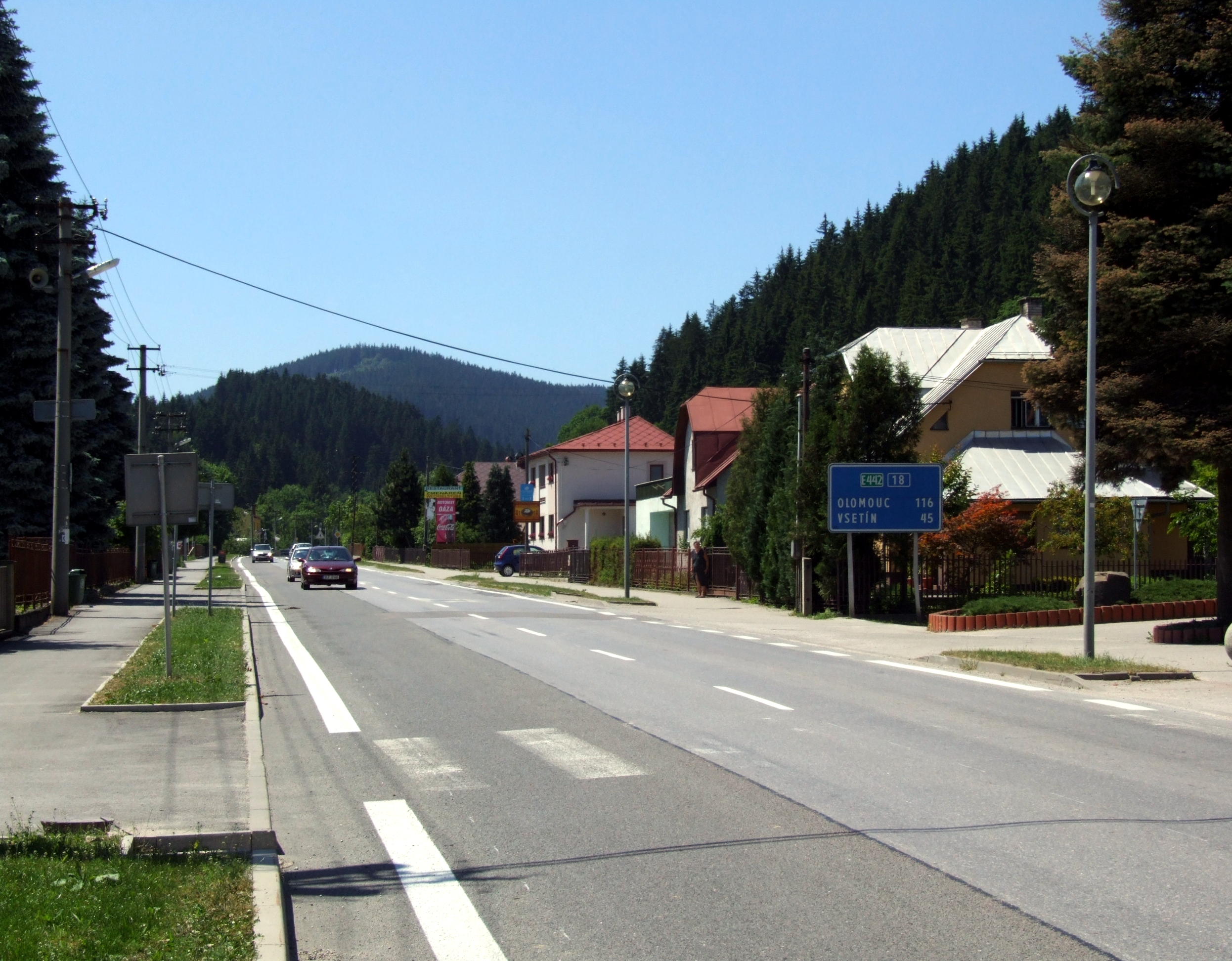

- Flag Coat of arms

- Location of Makov in the Žilina Region Location of Makov in Slovakia
- Coordinates: 49°22′00″N 18°29′00″E
- Country: Slovakia
- Region: Žilina Region
- District: Čadca District
- First mentioned: 1720

Area
  - Total: 46.06 km^{2} (17.78 sq mi)
- Elevation: 633 m (2,077 ft)

Population (2025)
  - Total: 1,652
- Time zone: UTC+1 (CET)
  - Summer (DST): UTC+2 (CEST)
- Postal code: 235 6
- Area code: +421 41
- Vehicle registration plate (until 2022): CA
- Website: www.makov.sk

Makov (Hungarian: Trencsénmakó) is a village and municipality in Čadca District in the Žilina Region of northern Slovakia. It has about 1,700 inhabitants.

== History ==
In historical records the village was first mentioned in 1720.

== Geography ==
The municipality lies at an altitude of 633 metres (2,077 ft) and covers an area of 46.06 km^{2} (17.78 sq mi) (2025).

== Population ==
Population statistic (10 years)
Year	1995	2005	2015	2025
Count	1978	1907	1763	1652
Difference		−3.58%	−7.55%	−6.29%

Population statistic
Year	2024	2025
Count	1662	1652
Difference		−0.60%

It has a population of 1652 people (31 December 2025).

=== Ethnicity ===
Census 2021 (1+ %)
Ethnicity	Number	Fraction
Slovak	1661	97.13%
Czech	41	2.39%
Not found out	23	1.34%
Total	1710	

In year 2021 was 1710 people by ethnicity 1661 as Slovak, 41 as Czech, 23 as Not found out, 3 as Ukrainian, 3 as Moravian, 2 as Italian, 2 as Russian, 2 as Polish, 2 as German, 2 as Hungarian, 2 as Other, 2 as French, 2 as Bulgarian, 1 as Rusyn, 1 as Romanian, 1 as Canadian and 1 as English.

Note on population: The difference values of population numbers in the table "Population statistic" and in the sections "Ethnicity" & "Religion" is caused by the use of various statistical methods.

=== Religion ===
Census 2021 (1+ %)
Religion	Number	Fraction
Roman Catholic Church	1426	83.39%
None	216	12.63%
Not found out	20	1.17%
Total	1710	

In year 2021 was 1710 people by religion 1426 from Roman Catholic Church, 216 from None, 20 from Not found out, 14 from Greek Catholic Church, 7 from Eastern Orthodox Church, 7 from Jehovah's Witnesses, 7 from Evangelical Church, 5 from Christian Congregations in Slovakia, 3 from Calvinist Church, 2 from Ad hoc movements, 1 from Other and not ascertained christian church, 1 from Other and 1 from Buddhism.
