= Maple Mountains =

Mountain range in the Czech Republic and Slovakia

Javorníky
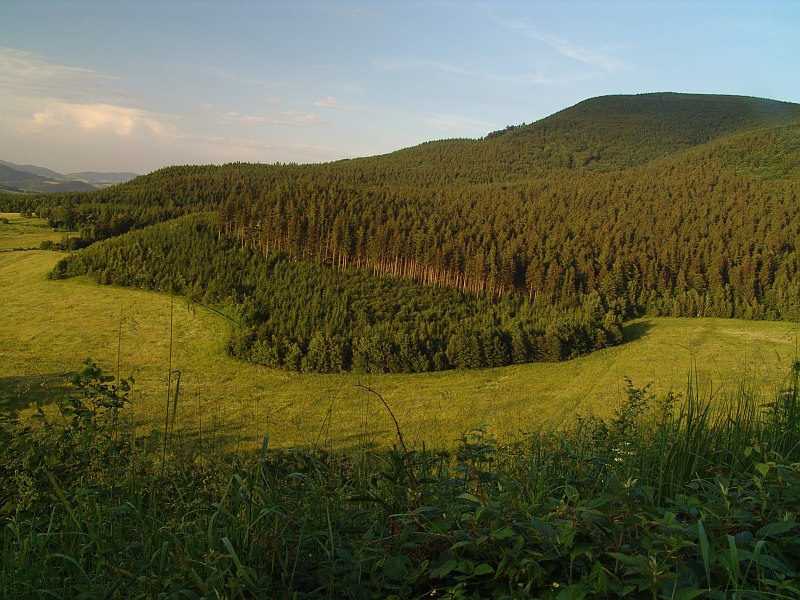
- Veľký Javorník

Highest point
- Peak: Veľký Javorník
- Elevation: 1,071 m (3,514 ft)
- Coordinates: 49°31′35″N 18°9′45″E

Geography
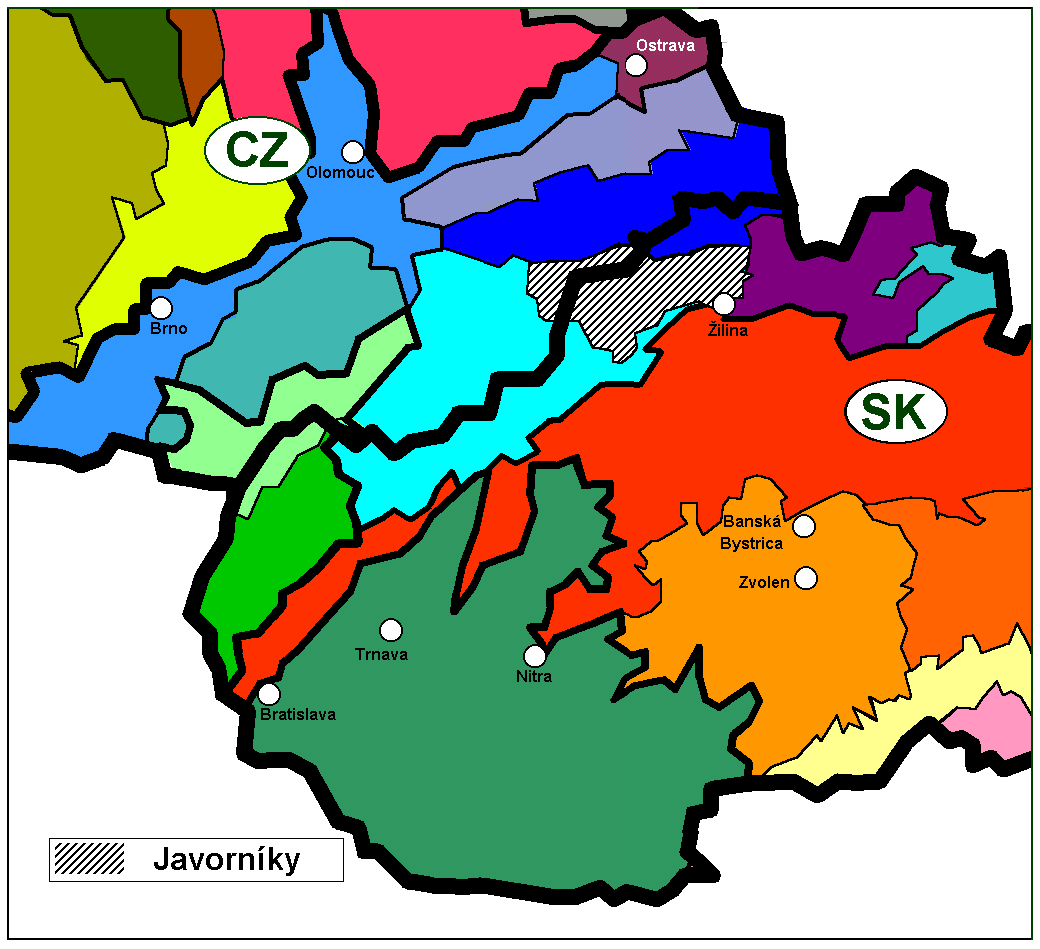
- Javorníky within the geomorphological division of Slovakia and the Czech Republic
- Countries: Slovakia; Czech Republic
- Parent range: Western Carpathians

The Maple Mountains, Javornik Mountains, or Javorniks (Czech and Slovak: Javorníky) are a mountain range of the Slovak-Moravian Carpathians that forms part of the border between the Czech Republic and Slovakia.

Its highest point is Veľký Javorník at 1,071 meters (3,514 ft). The range stretches from the White Carpathians in the south to the Beskids in the north. The range divides the Bečva and Oder river systems from those of the Turiec and Váh along the European Watershed. Part of the range falls within the Slovak Kysuce Protected Landscape Area.
