= Bytča Castle =

Historic site in Slovakia

Coordinates: 49°13′12″N 18°33′33″E

- Kaštieľ v Bytči
- Bytča, Slovakia
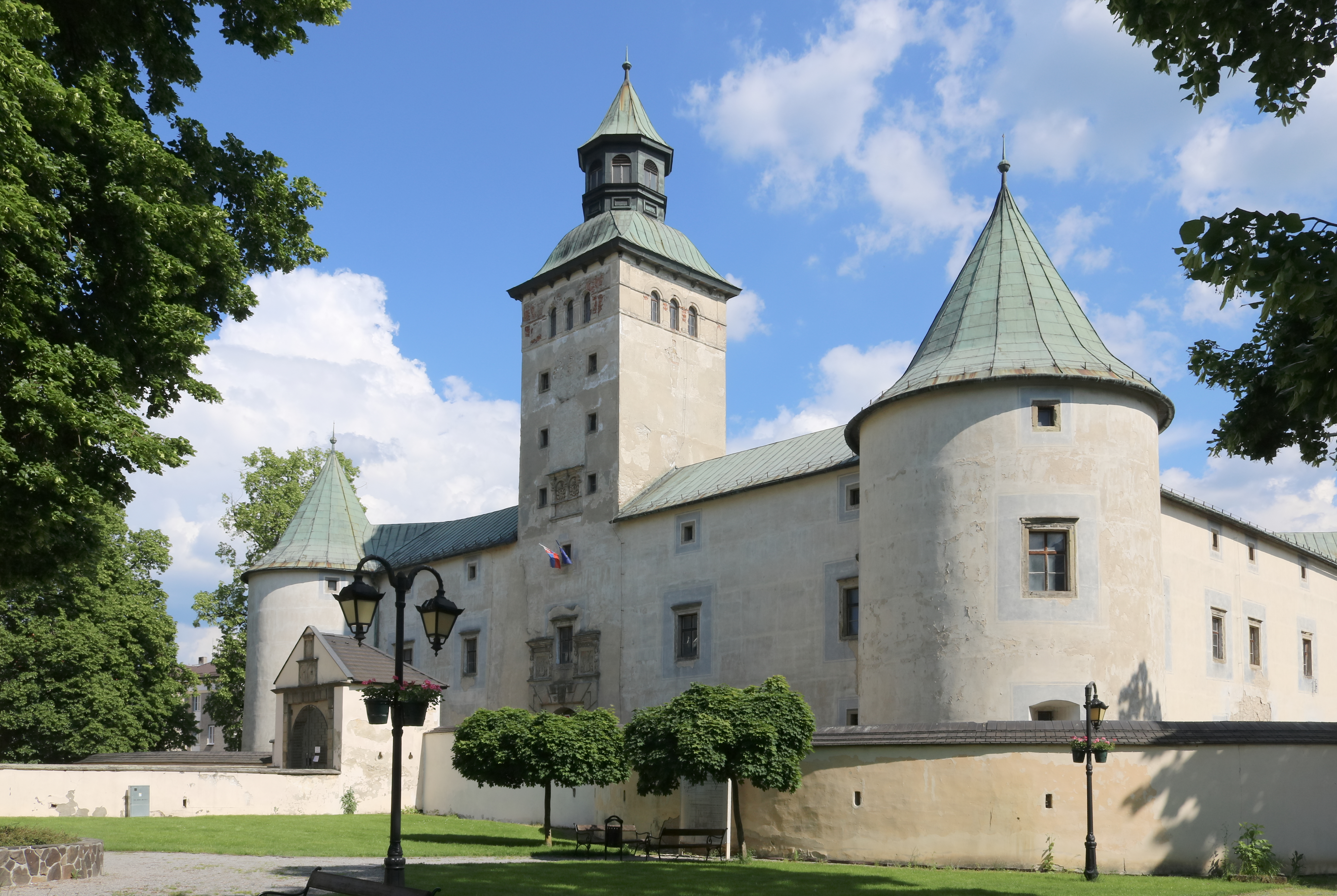

Site information
- Type: Castle
- Controlled by: Cultural Heritage Monuments of Slovakia

Site history
- Built: 1571–1574

Bytča Castle (Slovak: Kaštieľ v Bytči, Hungarian: nagybiccsei várkastély) also known as Bytča Manor, is a Renaissance building (manor house, sometimes referred to as a castle) in the center of the district town of Bytča in the Žilina Region, Slovakia.

The manor house complex, consisting of its own Renaissance palace and the Wedding Palace, as well as farm and residential buildings, is one of the most significant and architecturally impressive feudal residences in Slovakia. Bytča Castle is also considered to be one of the most important Renaissance monuments not only in Slovakia, but also in Central Europe. It has been listed as a national cultural monument since 1970.

== History ==
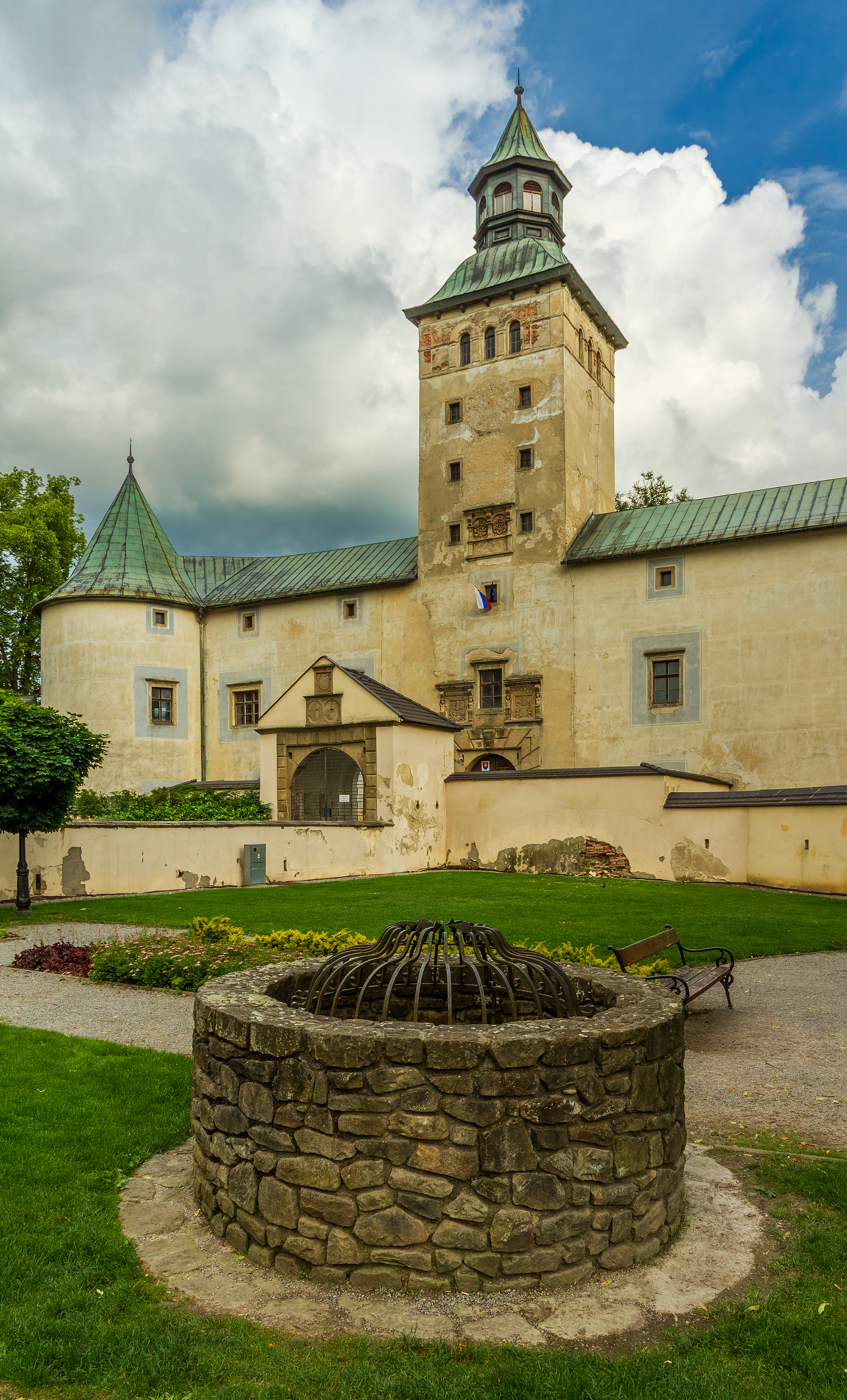
Inside of the castle walls.

A part of the Habsburg-affiliated Kingdom of Hungary, the Bytča Castle was built in the place of an older building (a water castle) between 1571 and 1574 by Ferenc Thurzó, the father of György Thurzó, Palatine of Hungary. Following the extinction of the Thurzó family in the early 17th century, the castle came into the possession of the Esterházy family, who repurposed it as a farm structure. In 1862, the property was acquired by the Popper family, a group of merchants, who renovated the castle into residential apartments and converted the Wedding Palace into a district court. János Ujváry, known as Fickó, who was an associate of Elizabeth Báthory, was also imprisoned in Bytča castle. At the dawn of the 18th century, the famed Slovak outlaw Juraj Jánošík served as a prison officer within the castle's walls. He facilitated the escape of the imprisoned Tomáš Uhorčík, and together they formed a band of forest robbers. This connection may have given rise to the legend of this national hero in the region. Currently, the castle is home to the State District Archive, while the Wedding Palace is under the auspices of the Považské Museum in Žilina. The Wedding Palace has recently undergone reconstruction and is now open to the public.

== Reconstruction ==
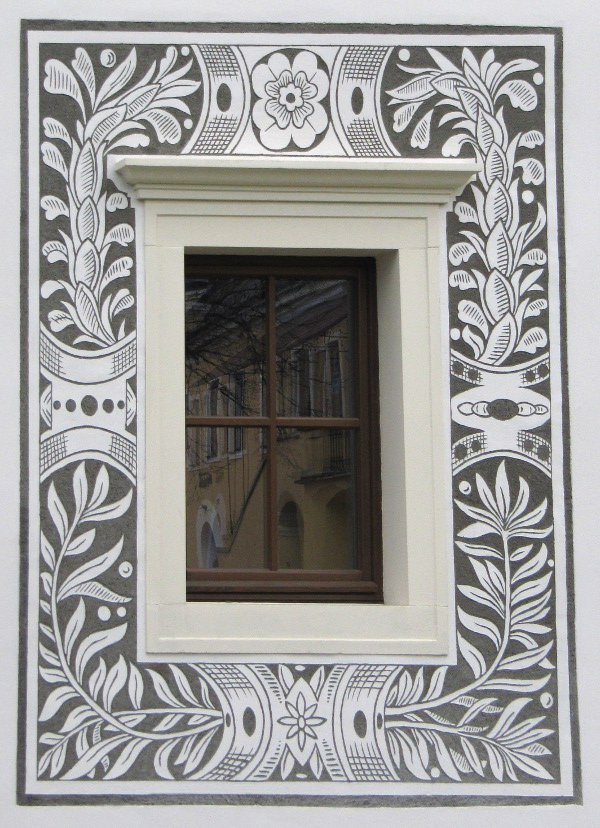
Window of the Wedding Palace with sgraffito decoration.

The unprofessional restoration efforts conducted in 1889 and between 1926 and 1929 led to the destruction of rare wall paintings located in the courtyard of the manor house. The restorers employed inappropriate oil paints and failed to adhere to the original designs. Additionally, the constant risk of fire compelled Leopold Popper to alter the roof structure, resulting in a change to its current shape. Presently, the manor house serves as the headquarters for the State Archive. Adjacent to the manor house is the Marriage Palace, a unique structure in Slovakia, constructed in 1601 by the Hungarian palatine György Thurzó. This palace was the venue for the wedding celebrations of his seven daughters and now functions as an exhibition space.

== See also ==
- List of castles in Slovakia
