= Upper Váh region =

Region in Slovakia

Coordinates: 49°N 19°E

Upper Váh Horné Považie
- Upper Váh region
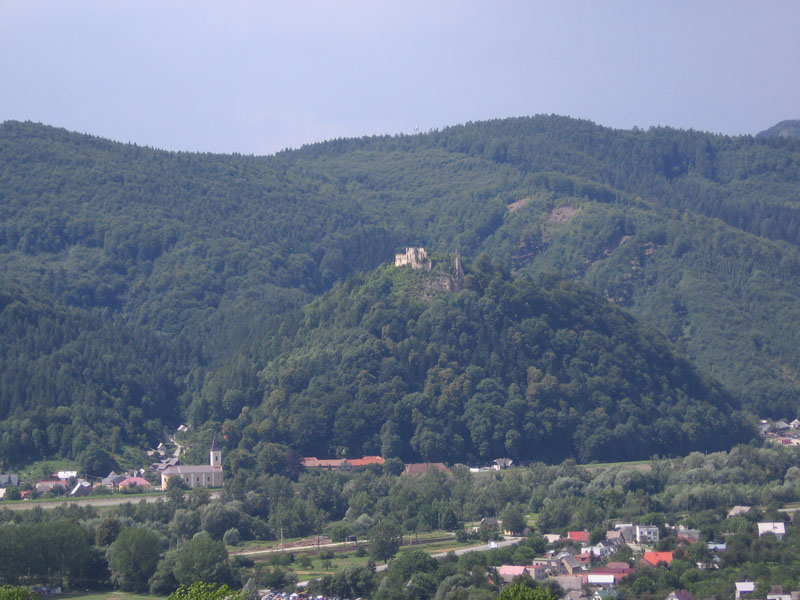
- Povazsky Castle in 2005.
- Interactive map of Upper Váh

The Upper Váh region (Slovak: Horné Považie) is a tourism region in the north-west of Slovakia. Because of its countryside, it is one of the most visited regions in Slovakia. Until the year 1923, it was part of Trencsén County.

== Geography ==
The region lies along the northern part of the river Váh. It borders the following regions: Kysuce in the north, Orava in the east, Turiec in the southeast, Upper Nitra in the south, Middle Váh region in the south-west and Moravian Wallachia in the north-west.

== Districts ==
- Bytča District
- Považská Bystrica District
- Žilina District
- Púchov District

== Places of interest ==
=== Castles ===
==== Považský hrad ====
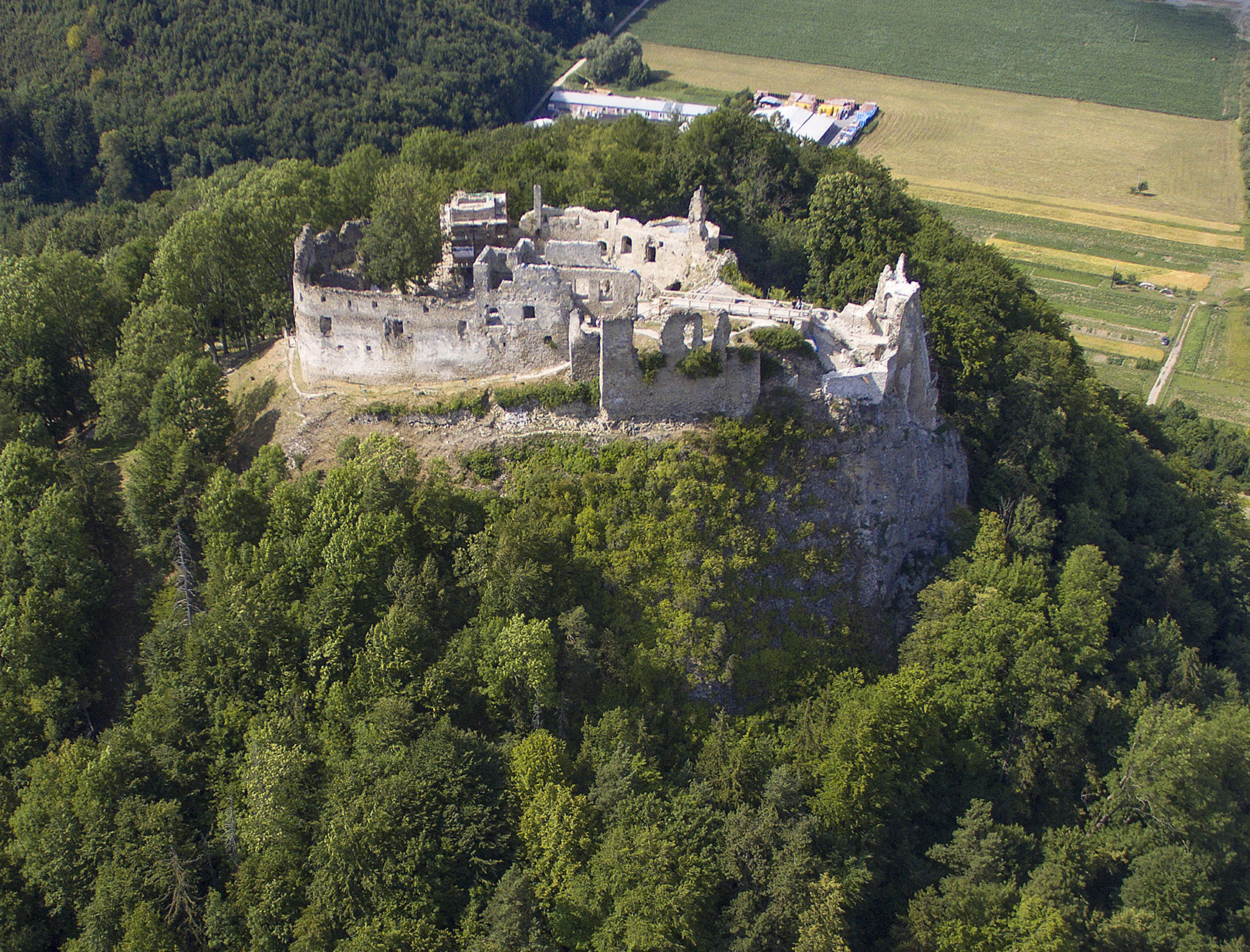
Castle Považský hrad

Považský Hrad is a ruin of medieval Gothic castle is making an essential silhouette on the right side of the river Váh, near Považská Bystrica. It is built on a cliff 497 meters above sea level. Due to its location it was one of the most important castles guarding the valley of the river Váh, location of the castle is attractive also nowadays because it is set above important rail and road routes. At the peak of its fame it was home of around 400 people. It is famously known as an "eagles nest" of the important noble family of Podmaniczky, which controlled most of the region.

===== Budatín Castle =====
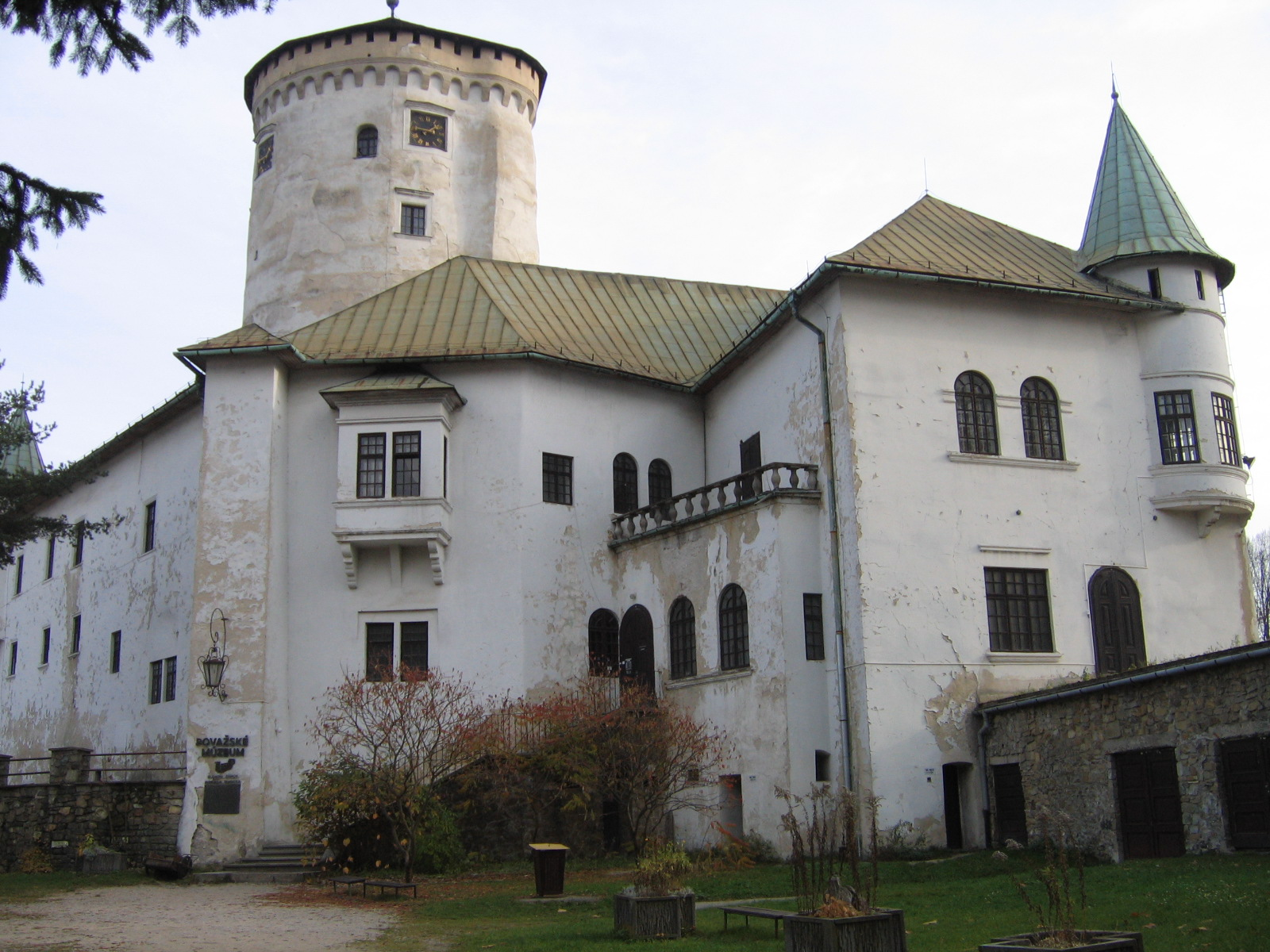
Budatín castle

Budatín castle is a castle in north-western Slovakia. It was built as a guarding castle in the second half of the 13th century near the confluence of the Kysuca and the Váh, where tolls were collected. At the beginning of the 14th century, originally royal fortress passed into the hands of Matthew Csák and the castle, especially towers were fortified, and inside the fortress a new palace was built.

==== Strečno Castle ====
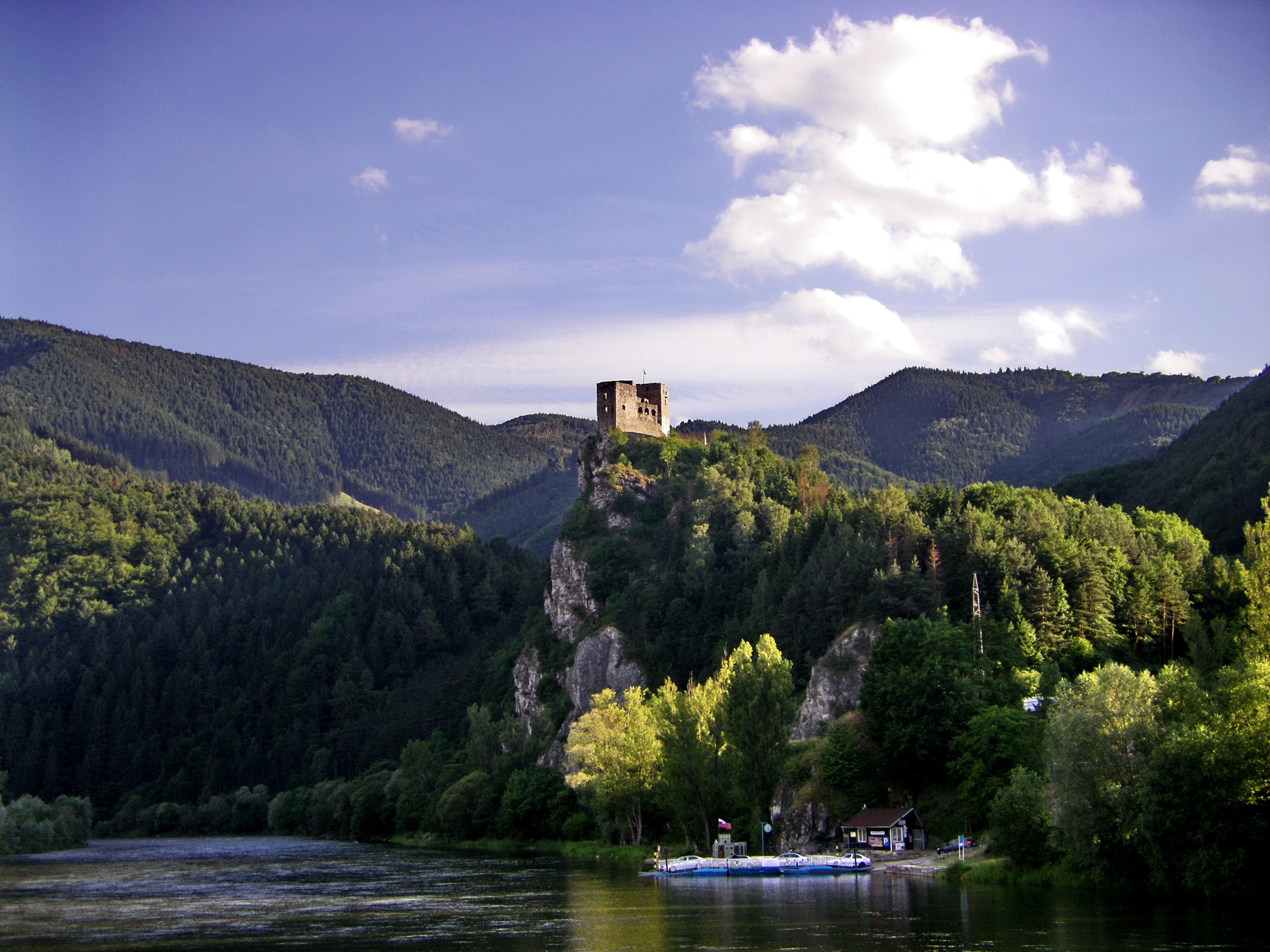
Strečno castle

Strečno castle is a castle in north-western Slovakia. It is the symbol of slovak feudalism. It was built in the 14th century. Leopold I ordered to destroy the castle in the 17th century, similarity with Považský hrad. It is part of Slovak national heritage.

==== Bytča Castle ====
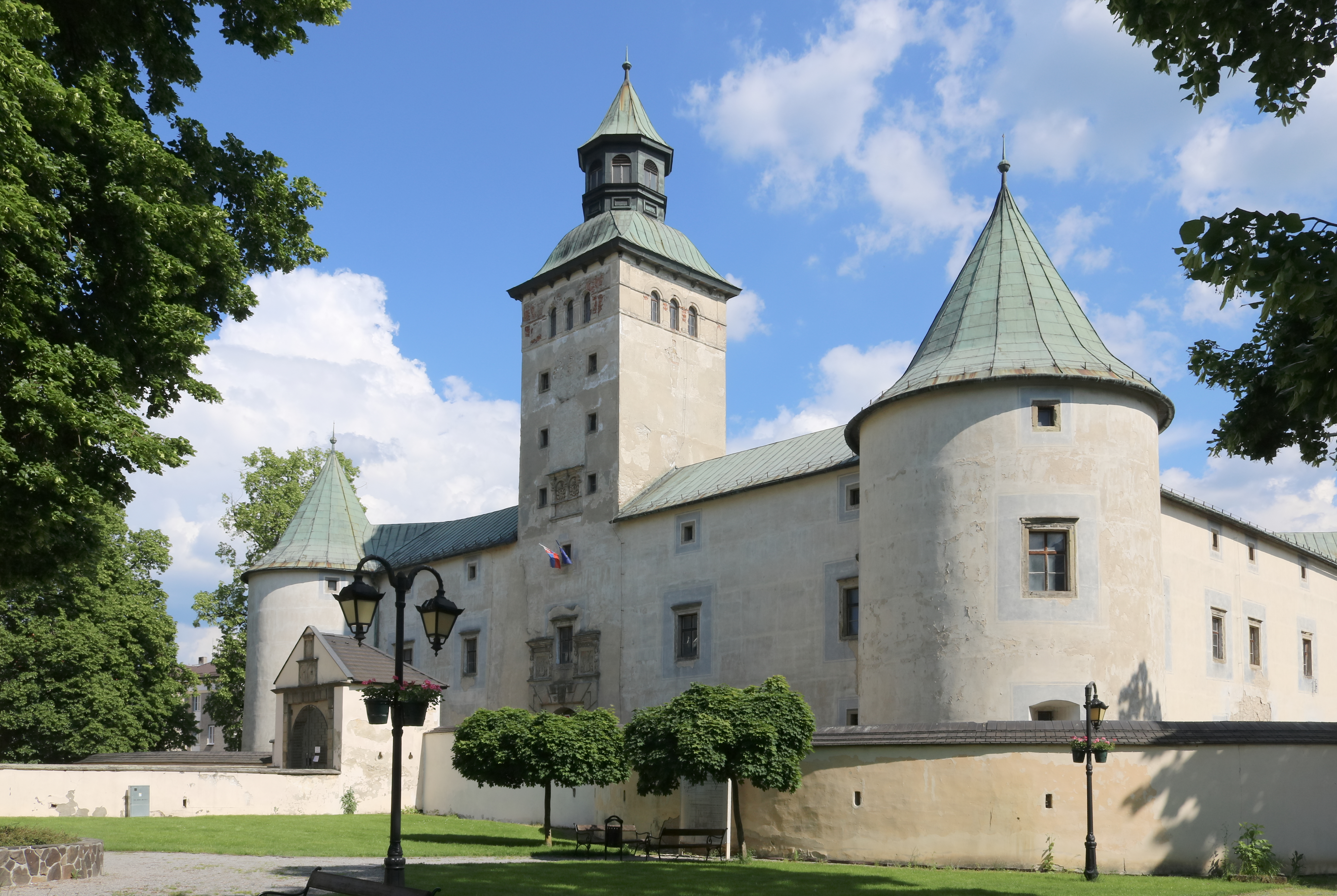
Bytča Castle is also sometimes referred to as a manor.

Bytča Castle is a castle in the centre of the town of Bytca. It was built in the 13th century by the archbishop of Nitra. From 1563 it became the possession of Frantisek Thurzo. He built a manor house around an old Gothic castle. Works ended in 1574. A famous Italian architect Kilian of Milan was invited to supervise the works. Another great Italian architect was called to supervise the repairs in 1612, it was Pocabello.
