= Clarissine Church =

Clarissine Church may refer to:

- Any church or convent maintained by the order of Poor Clares
- Clarissine Church (Bamberg), in Bamberg
- Clarissine Church (Bratislava), in Bratislava
- Clarissine Church (Brixen), in Brixen
- Clarissine Church (Nuremberg), in Nuremberg
