= Štefan Beniač =

- Born: 27 March 1869; Austria-Hungary, Žilina
- Died: 21 February 1942 (Slovak Republic (1939–1945)) Slovak Republic (1939–1945), Spišská Sobota
- Other names: Benyács, Csacai
- Education: Bishop's seminary of St. Ladislas the King in Nitra (slovak: Biskupský kňazský seminár svätého Ladislava kráľa v Nitre)
- Church: Catholic Church
- Ordained: 6 August 1891
- Title: Papal count

Štefan Beniač KC*HS, born Benyács (* 27 March 1869, Žilina – † 21 February 1942, Spišská Sobota) was a Slovak priest, preacher and publicist. Until 1918, he used the pseudonym Csacai (slovak: Čadčiansky).

== Biography ==
Štefan Beniač was born in Žilina to his parents Štefan (butcher in Žilina) and Juliana (born Piovarči). He studied in Nitra. After study he became a chaplain in Raková (Kysuce region) and Rosina. From 1902 until 1920 he was a parish priest in Čadca. Beniač was a shareholder in Textile factory in Čadca. Shareholders of this factory made him the reason for the bankruptcy of the factory after the World War I. As a result of these events, he retired in 1920 and left Čadca. He lived in Budapest (Hungary) since then and he died on February 21, 1942, in Spišská Sobota. He was buried at the cemetery in Žilina. Štefan Beniač was a publisher for many ecclesiastical newspapers.

== Honours and awards ==
- Benemerenti Medal awarded in 1902 by Pope Leo XIII.
- Order of the Holy Sepulchre, „Grand Officier“ – KC*HS
- Papal count
