= Branislav Labant =

Slovak footballer

Personal information
- Date of birth: 11 May 1976 (age 50)
- Place of birth: Žilina, Czechoslovakia
- Height: 1.77 m (5 ft 10 in)
- Position: Defender

Team information
- Current team: FC Nitra
- Number: 5

Senior career*
Years	Team	Apps	(Gls)
1994–2006	MŠK Žilina	190	(11)
1998–1999	→ FC Rimavská Sobota (loan)	3	(0)
2006–2008	FK Viktoria Žižkov	48	(2)
2008	FC Nitra	9	(0)

International career^{‡}
2003	Slovakia	8	(0)
- * Club domestic league appearances and goals as of 11 December 2008 ‡ National team caps and goals as of 18:27, 3 December 2008 (UTC)

Branislav Labant (born 11 May 1976 in Žilina) is a retired Slovak footballer who last played for FC Nitra in the Slovak Corgoň liga.

== Club career ==
Labant previously played for FK Viktoria Žižkov in the Czech Gambrinus Liga. Prior to that, he had played since his early youth for the Slovak side MŠK Žilina with whom he won three consecutive Slovak Top Division championships.

== Honours ==
- Slovak First Football League Team of the Season: 2002–03,
