= Church of Saint Stephen the King =

Oldest extant historical building in Žilina, Slovakia

Coordinates: 49°12′58″N 18°43′37″E

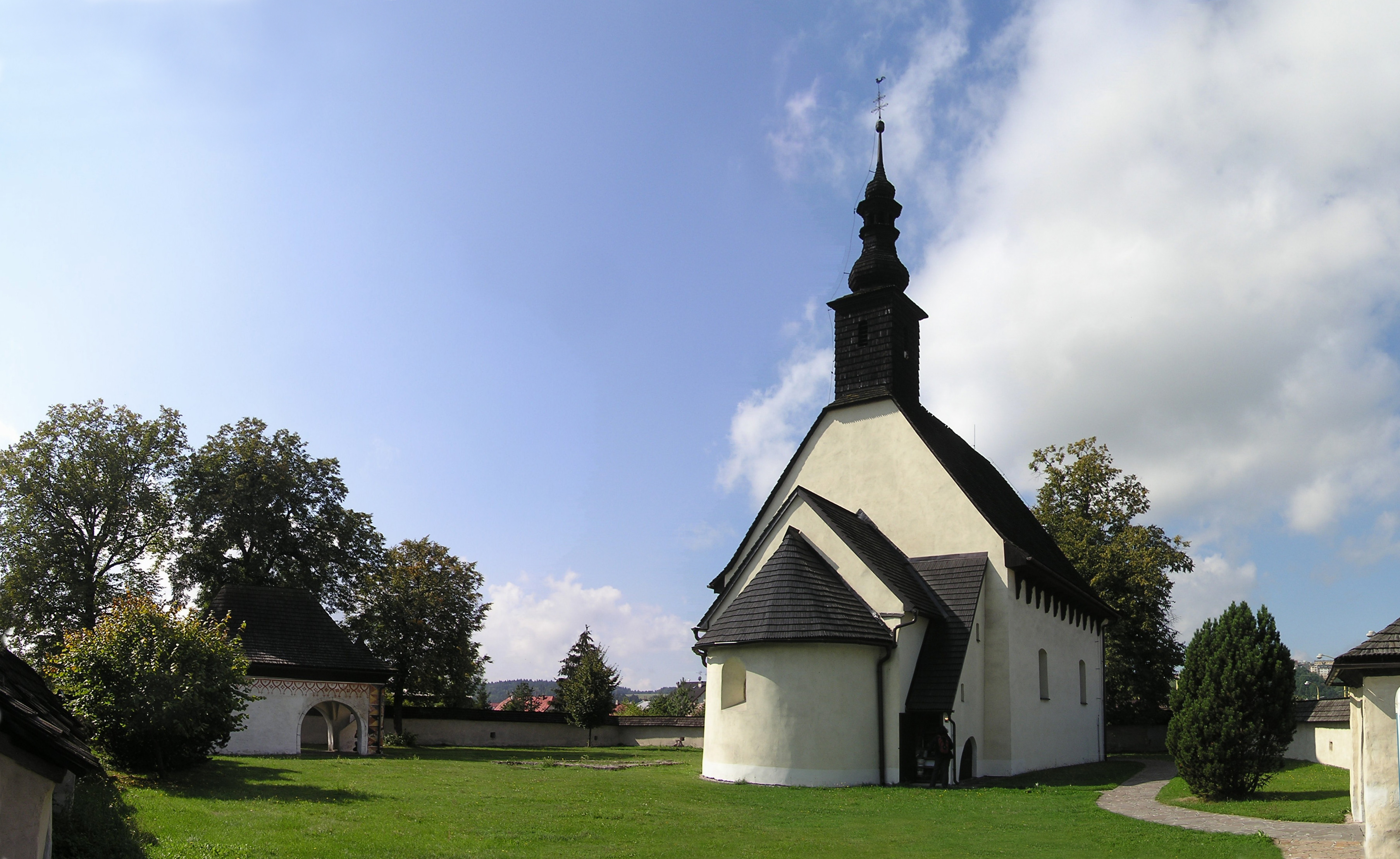
Church of Saint Stefan

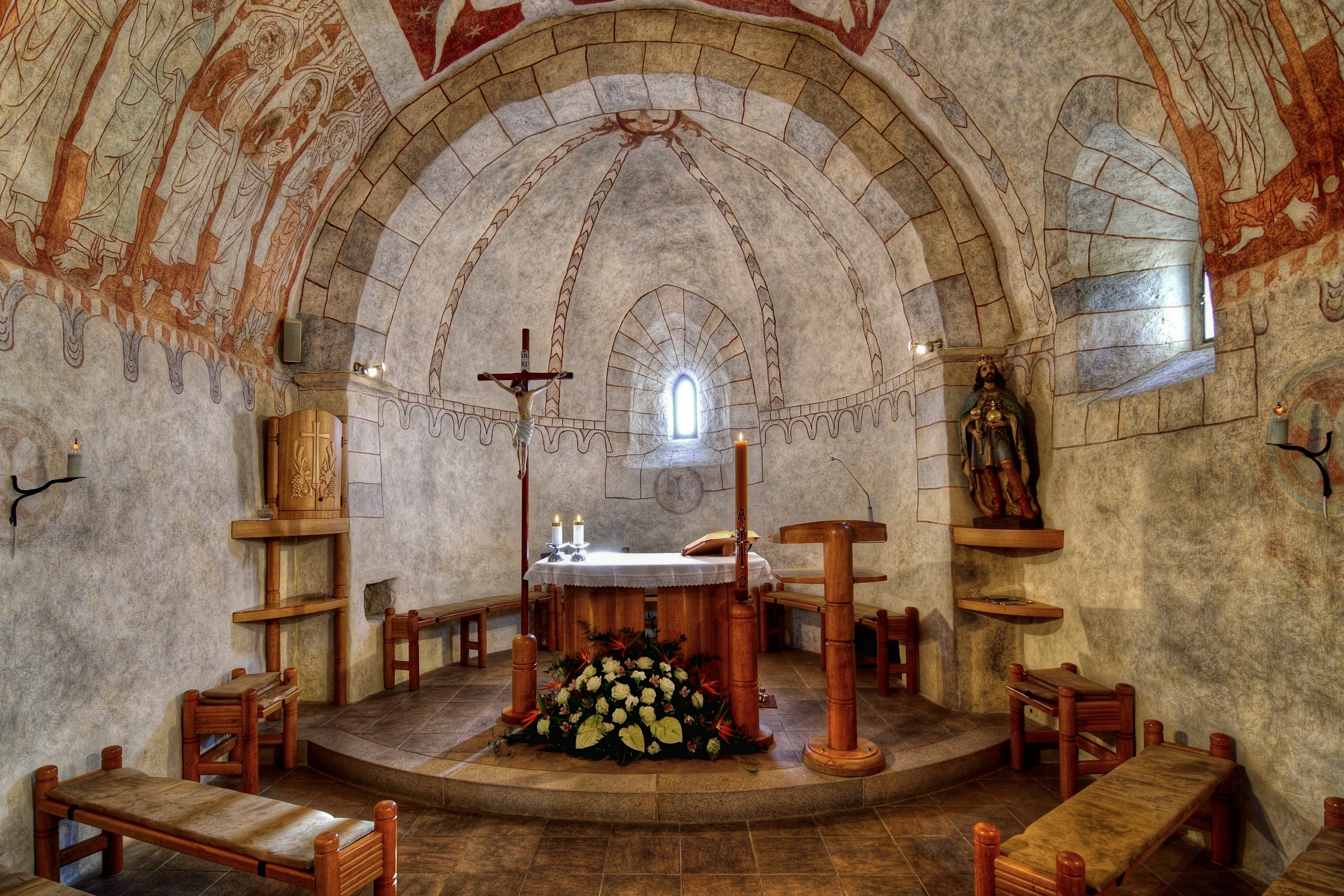
Interior (2012)

The Church of Saint Stephen the King is the oldest extant historical building located in Žilina, Slovakia.
