= Miroslav Šustek =

Slovak author (born 1947)

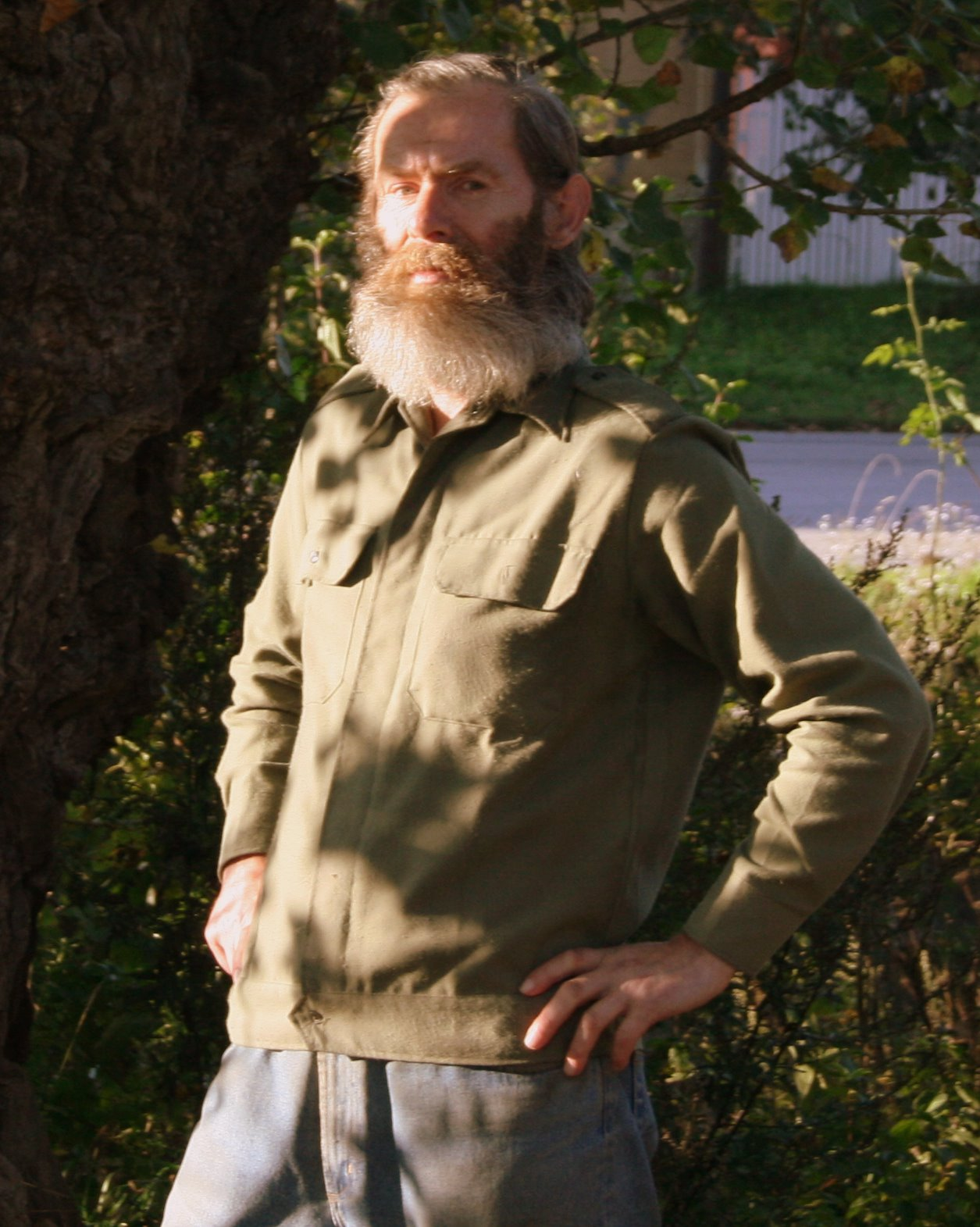
- Born: January 4, 1947 Žilina, Czechoslovakia
- Died: January 15, 2015 (aged 68) Žilina, Slovakia
- Occupation: Short story writer
- Genre: Horror, adventure, ghost story

Miroslav Šustek (born 1947) was a Slovak horror and ghost story writer. Despite his forty years of prolific writing, his debut short story collection, Nie ste vy náhodou ten chýrny pán Rafin? (Are You By Any Chance The Famous Mr Rafin?) was only first published in 2007.

== Biography ==
Miroslav Šustek was born on January 4, 1947, in Žilina, Czechoslovakia (now Slovakia). He has spent the majority of his life in his hometown. Having become partially disabled at a young age, Šustek devoted his life to writing, his stories initially heavily influenced by classics of the macabre, horror and ghost story genres, later adding elements of humour and parody to the mix.

== Writing career ==
Despite having written more than a thousand short stories in more than forty years of continuous writing, none of them were published until 2000, when Šustek met the future publishers of the Hlboký hrob online horror magazine. Two of his stories published in Hlboký hrob were later included in the Neželané dedičstvo po neobľúbenom strýkovi (An Unwanted Inheritance Left By An Unpopular Uncle) anthology in 2006. Šustek's debut short story collection was subsequently published in 2007.

== Works ==
- Nie ste vy náhodou ten slávny pán Rafin? (2007) ISBN 978-80-968845-8-2
