= Branislav Rzeszoto =

Slovak footballer (born 1975)

Personal information
- Date of birth: 3 November 1975 (age 50)
- Place of birth: Žilina, Czechoslovakia
- Height: 1.88 m (6 ft 2 in)
- Position: Goalkeeper

Senior career*
Years	Team	Apps	(Gls)
1994–1997	MŠK Žilina	66	(0)
1997–2000	FC Spartak Trnava	5	(0)
2000–2002	MŠK Žilina	63	(0)
2002–2003	FC Tescoma Zlín	27	(0)
2003–2004	MŠK Žilina	6	(0)
2004	ŠK Slovan Bratislava	7	(0)
2004–2005	APOEL	2	(0)
2005–2007	FC Vysočina Jihlava	41	(0)
2008	FC Senec	1	(0)
2008–2009	FK DAC 1904 Dunajská Streda	3	(0)
2009–	Ascoli Calcio		

International career
2002–2003	Slovakia	3	(0)
- * Club domestic league appearances and goals

Branislav Rzeszoto (born 3 November 1975) is a Slovak former football goalkeeper.

== Club career ==
Rzeszoto played for MŠK Žilina, FC Spartak Trnava and ŠK Slovan Bratislava in the Slovak Corgoň Liga. He also played for FC Tescoma Zlín and FC Vysočina Jihlava in the Czech First League. Rzeszoto also had a brief spell with APOEL in Cyprus.
