= Clarissine Church (Bratislava) =

- Church of the Exaltation of the Holy Cross and Monastery of the Order of Saint Clare, Bratislava
- Kostol Povýšenia svätého Kríža a kláštor klarisiek Kostol Povýšenia svätého Kríža; Kostol klarisiek
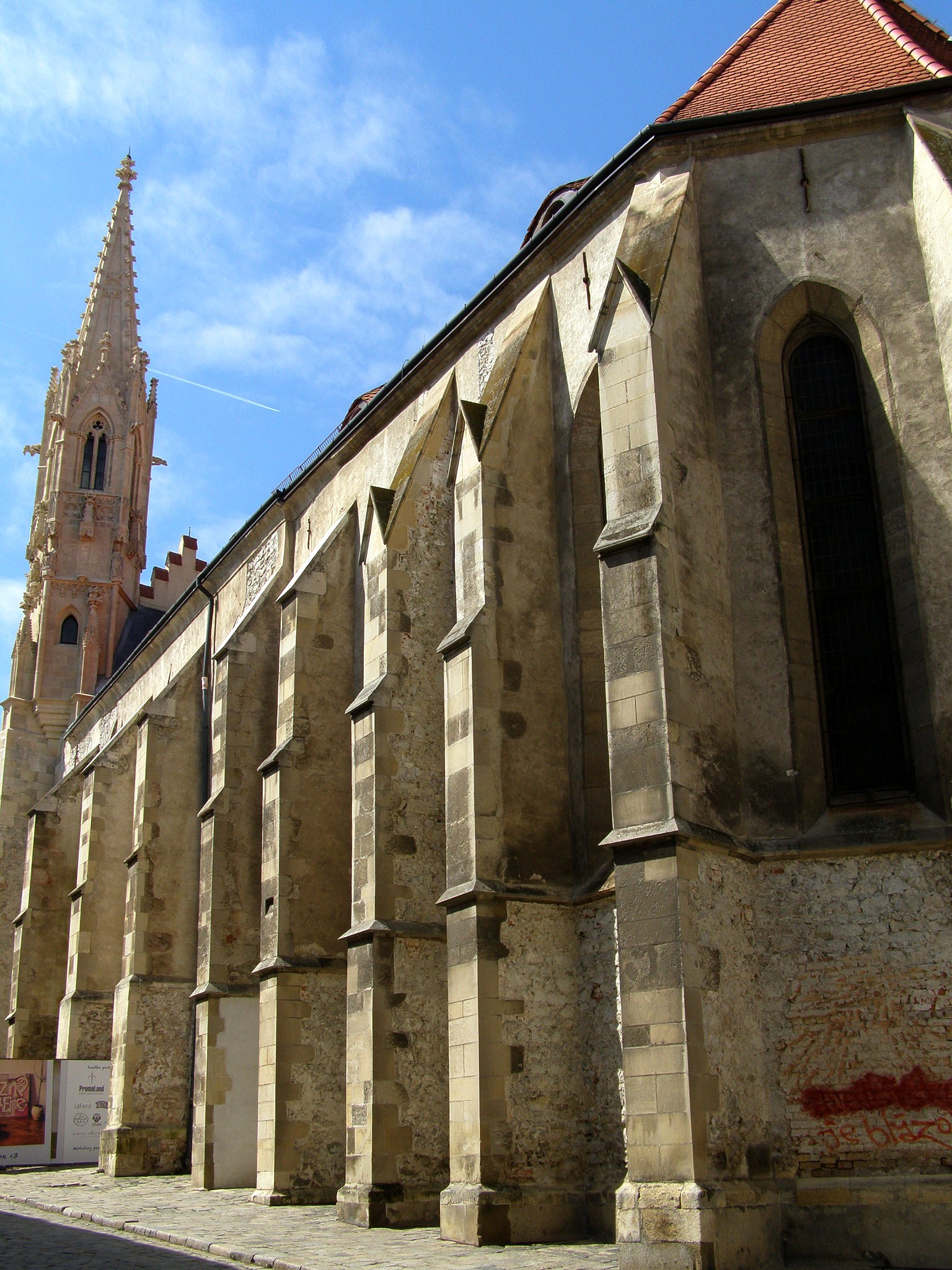
- Clarissine Church
- 48°8′38″N 17°6′19″E
- Location: Old Town, Bratislava
- Country: Slovakia
- Previous denomination: Roman Catholic Church
- Religious institute: Order of Saint Clare

History
- Status: Abbey church (until 1782)
- Dedication: Exaltation of the Holy Cross

Architecture
- Functional status: Deconsecrated
- Heritage designation: Cultural Heritage Monument of Slovakia (ID: 101-78/2)
- Architectural type: Church
- Style: Gothic
- Groundbreaking: 1297
- Completed: 1370; 15th century (tower)

The Clarissine Church (Slovak: Kostol Povýšenia svätého Kríža, known as Kostol klarisiek, Hungarian: Klarissza templom és zárda) is a Gothic church, part of a complex of medieval buildings forming the former Convent of Poor Clares in the Old Town of Bratislava, the capital of Slovakia. The former Catholic church is owned by the city of Bratislava and it is used for cultural events. The church is a notable example of Gothic architecture in Slovakia.

== History and appearance ==
The nuns of the Poor Clares order came to Bratislava in 1297 and built a church and a convent with the support of the king. The pentagonal tower was completed in the 15th century. In 1782, the convent was dissolved, and the church became the seat of a legal academy and school. It is currently used as a concert and exhibition hall.

The Order of Poor Clares was expelled from the Kingdom of Hungary in 1782 by the decree of Joseph II, Holy Roman Emperor. There are also Clarissine churches in Bamberg, Brixen, and Nuremberg.

During the complex's time as a school, Jozef Murgaš and Béla Bartók studied there.

== See also ==
- History of Bratislava
