= Lukáš Pohůnek =

Czech-Slovak conductor (born 1988)

Lukáš Pohůnek (born 24 October 1988) is a Czech-Slovak conductor.

== Early life and education ==
Pohůnek was born in Žilina, Czechoslovakia (modern-day Slovakia). Having Czech ancestry on his father's side and Slovak ancestry on his mother's side he grew up in a bilingual family environment. After his initial music formation in Trumpet and Piano playing at Primary Music School of Ladislav Árvay in Žilina he continued in his studies at the Conservatoire of Žilina, making over the years a number of solo-trumpet appearances with the Slovak Philharmonic, Janáček Philharmonic Orchestra, Bohuslav Martinů Philharmonic and Slovak Sinfonietta under the baton of Jakub Hrůša, Christian Pollack and Karol Kevický who later became his first conducting teacher.

He achieved his university education at the Academy of Performing Arts in Prague where his teachers included Leoš Svárovský, Jiří Chvála, Lubomír Mátl and others. During the studies he made a study exchange at The Krzysztof Penderecki Academy of Music in Kraków where his teacher was Rafał Jacek Delekta. At various conducting masterclasses he learned from George Pehlivanian, Gianluigi Gelmetti, Colin Metters, Tadeusz Strugała, Czesław Grabowski and Mark Heron. As a student he began assisting Oliver von Dohnányi and started to conduct professional orchestras, achieving excellent reviews. University of Alberta cites his graduation performance of Antonín Dvořák's Czech Suite within their curated musical selection of online performances of Dvořák's works.

After the university graduation Pohůnek studied with Kurt Masur, at first at Manhattan School of Music within a special study programme and later on at Mendelssohn House in Leipzig as a scholar of the Mendelssohn Foundation.

== Career ==
Pohůnek has so far conducted or otherwise collaborated with major symphonic and chamber orchestras such as London Philharmonic Orchestra, Southbank Sinfonia, Leipziger Symphonieorchester, MSM Symphony Orchestra, Radio Television of Serbia Symphony Orchestra, Slovak Philharmonic, Radom Chamber Orchestra, Tadeusz Baird Philharmonic Zielona Góra, Janáček Philharmonic Orchestra, North Czech Philharmonic Teplice, Craiova "Oltenia" Philharmonic Orchestra, State Philharmonic Košice, Slovak Sinfonietta, Beethoven Academy Orchestra Kraków and others.

During his engagements he has collaborated with Vladimir Jurowski, James Judd, Julia Fischer, Martin James Bartlett, Agata Szymczewska, Roman Patkoló, Matej Arendárik and others.

== Contribution to Slovak Music ==
Pohůnek is known as ambassador of Slovak Music, making frequent overseas performances of symphonic and chamber works of Eugen Suchoň, Ján Cikker and other Slovak composers.

== Discography ==
Anton Bruckner: Symphony No. 7, 3rd Mvt

== See also ==
- List of Czech composers
- List of Slovak composers
