= Trnové =

City in Slovakia

Coordinates: 49.1836°N 18.7989°E

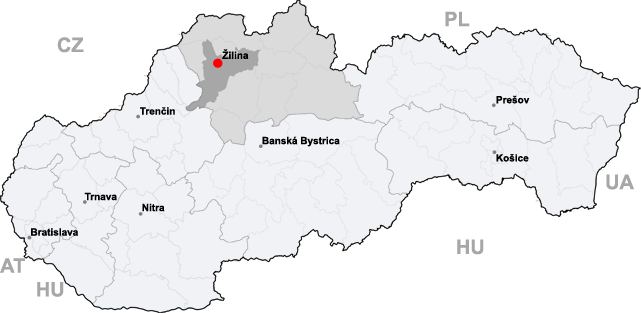
Location of Žilina in Slovakia

Trnové (Hungarian: Zsolnatarnó) is a city part in the north-western part of Slovakia, approximately 7 kilometres south-east from Žilina.

== History ==
The city part was first mentioned as a village in 1393.

== Geography ==
It has population of around 2,600 people.

== Sights ==
The city part offers a great view of the Malá Fatra mountains. It is also an entrance point into these mountains. There is a wooden Gothic Roman Catholic church of Saint George built in the 15th century.
