= Žilina =

- City
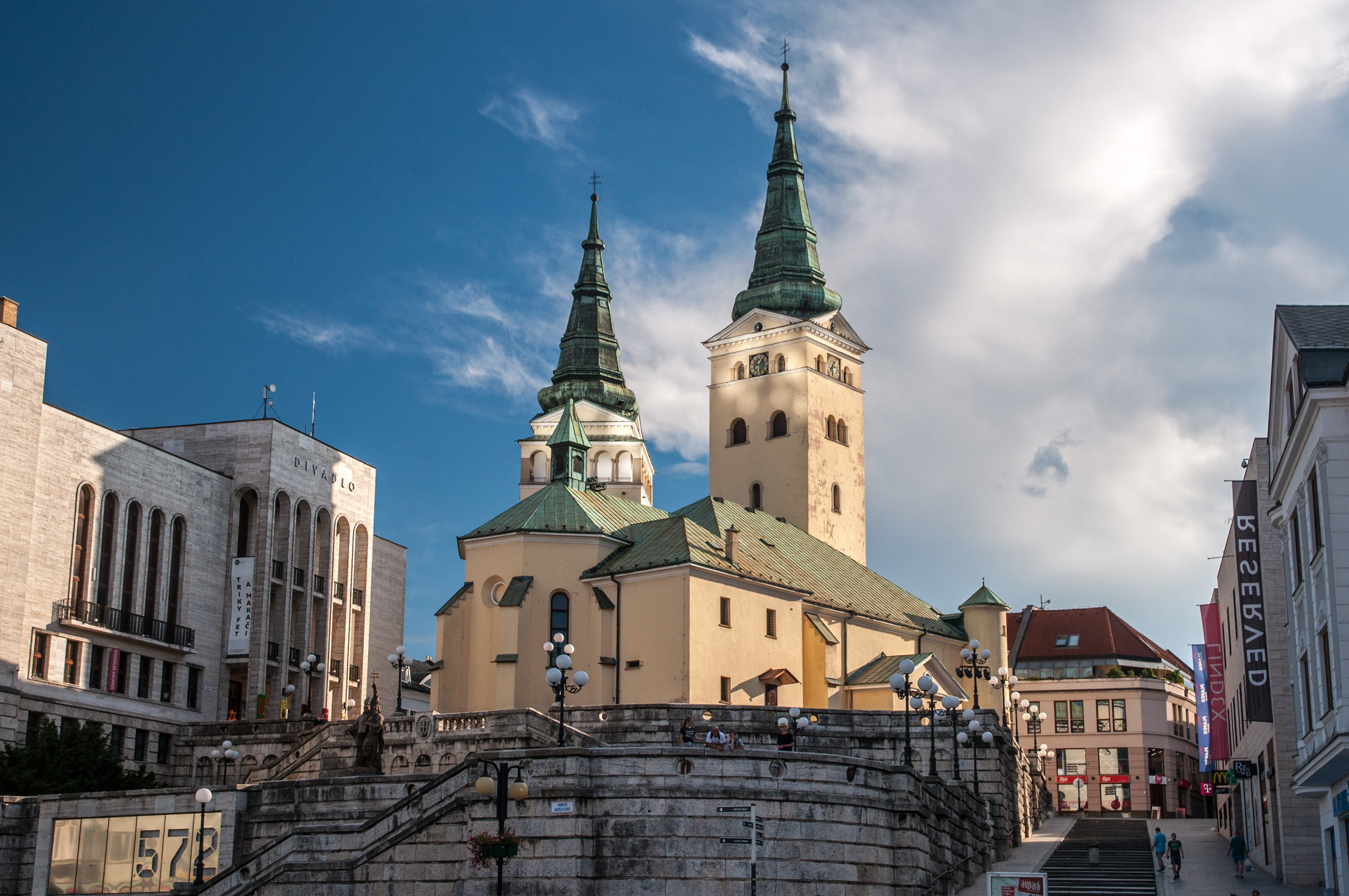
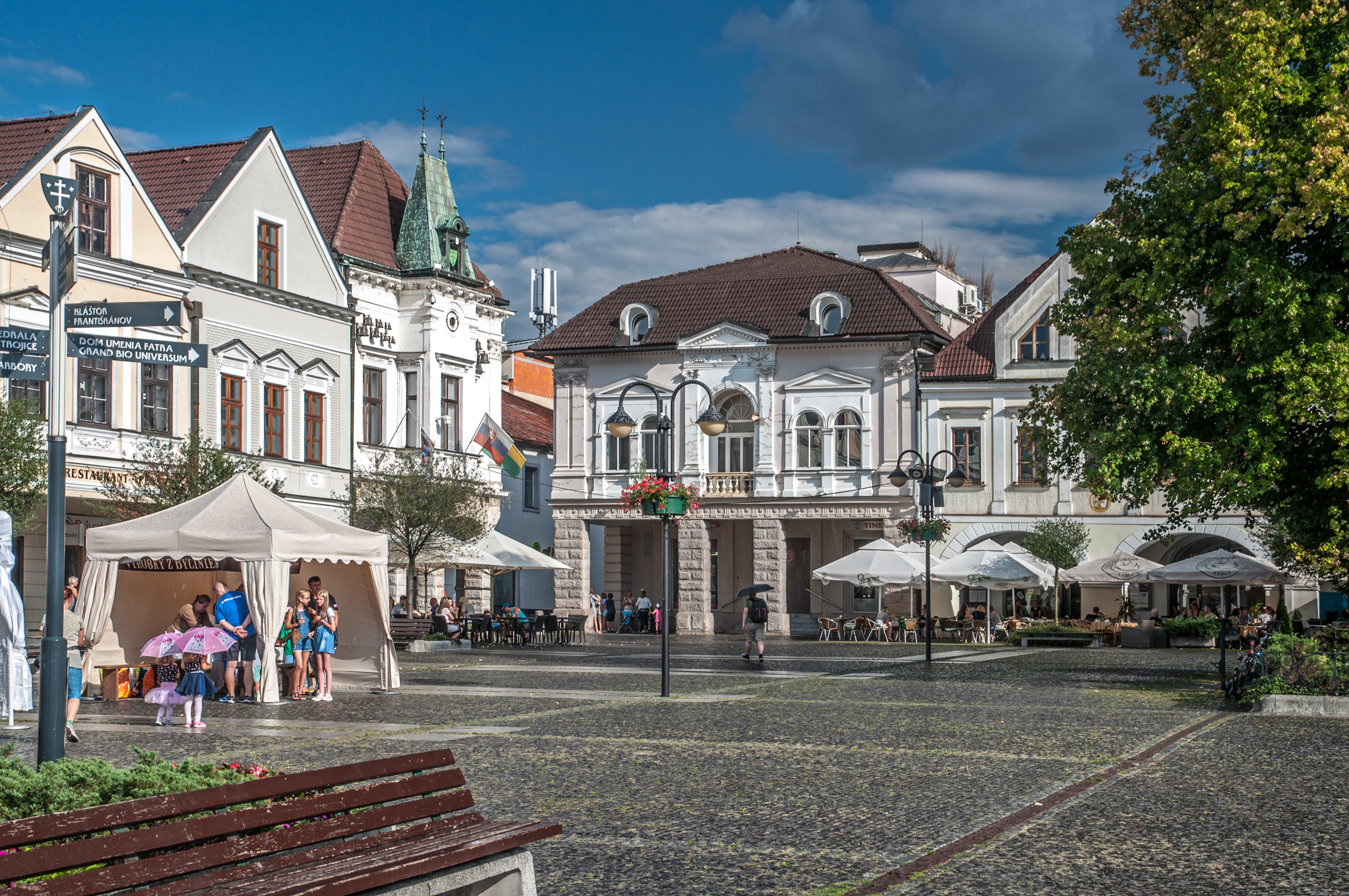
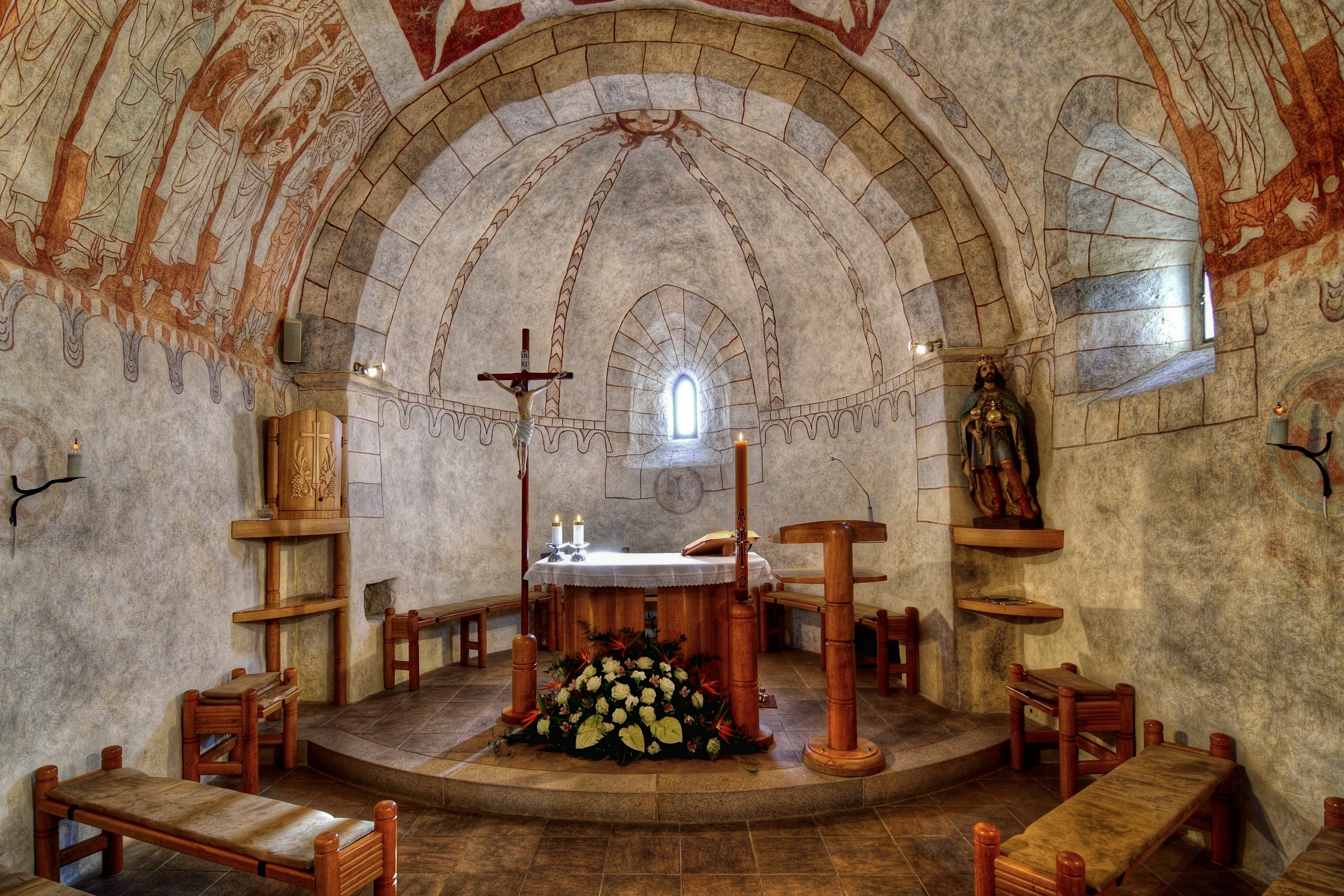
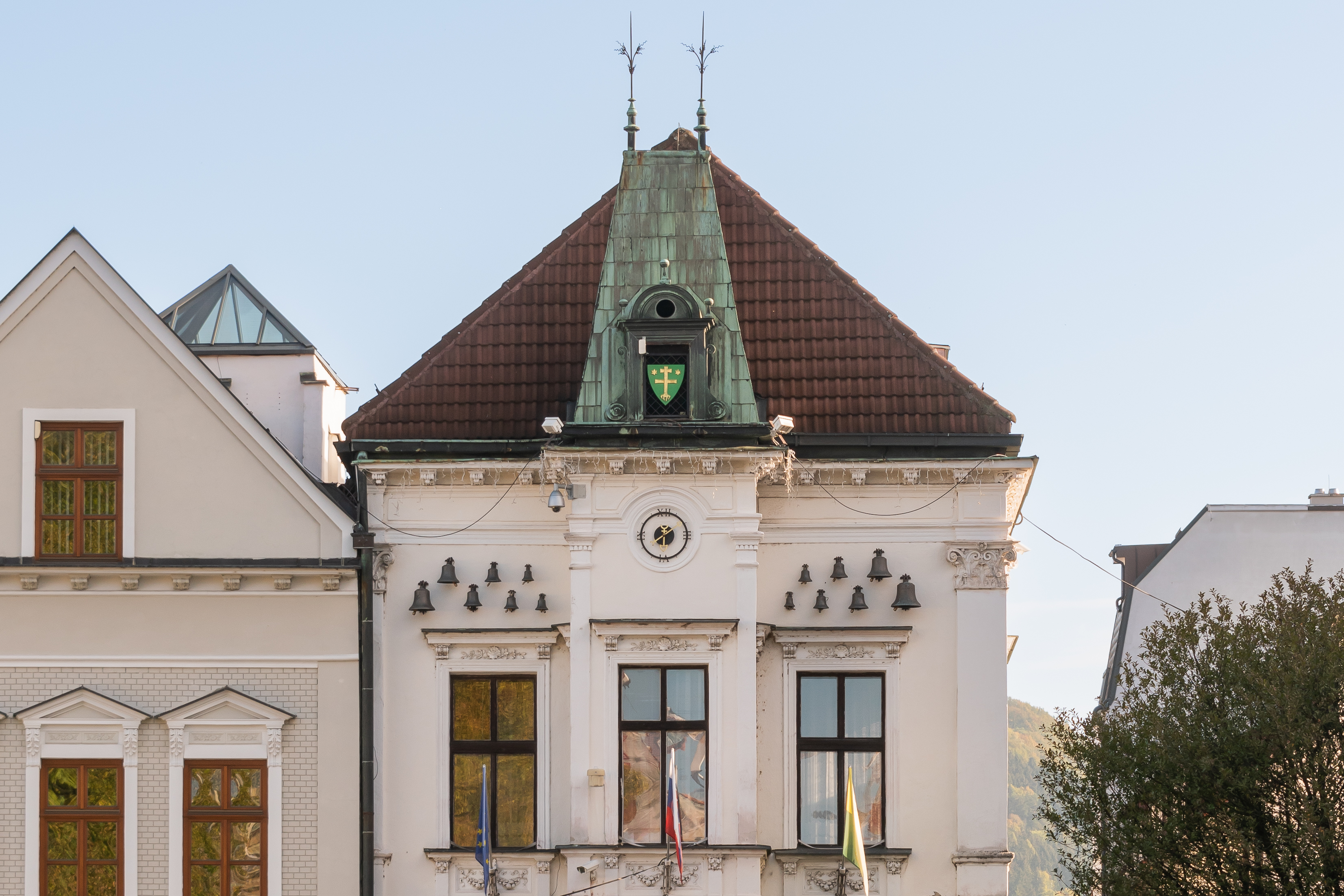
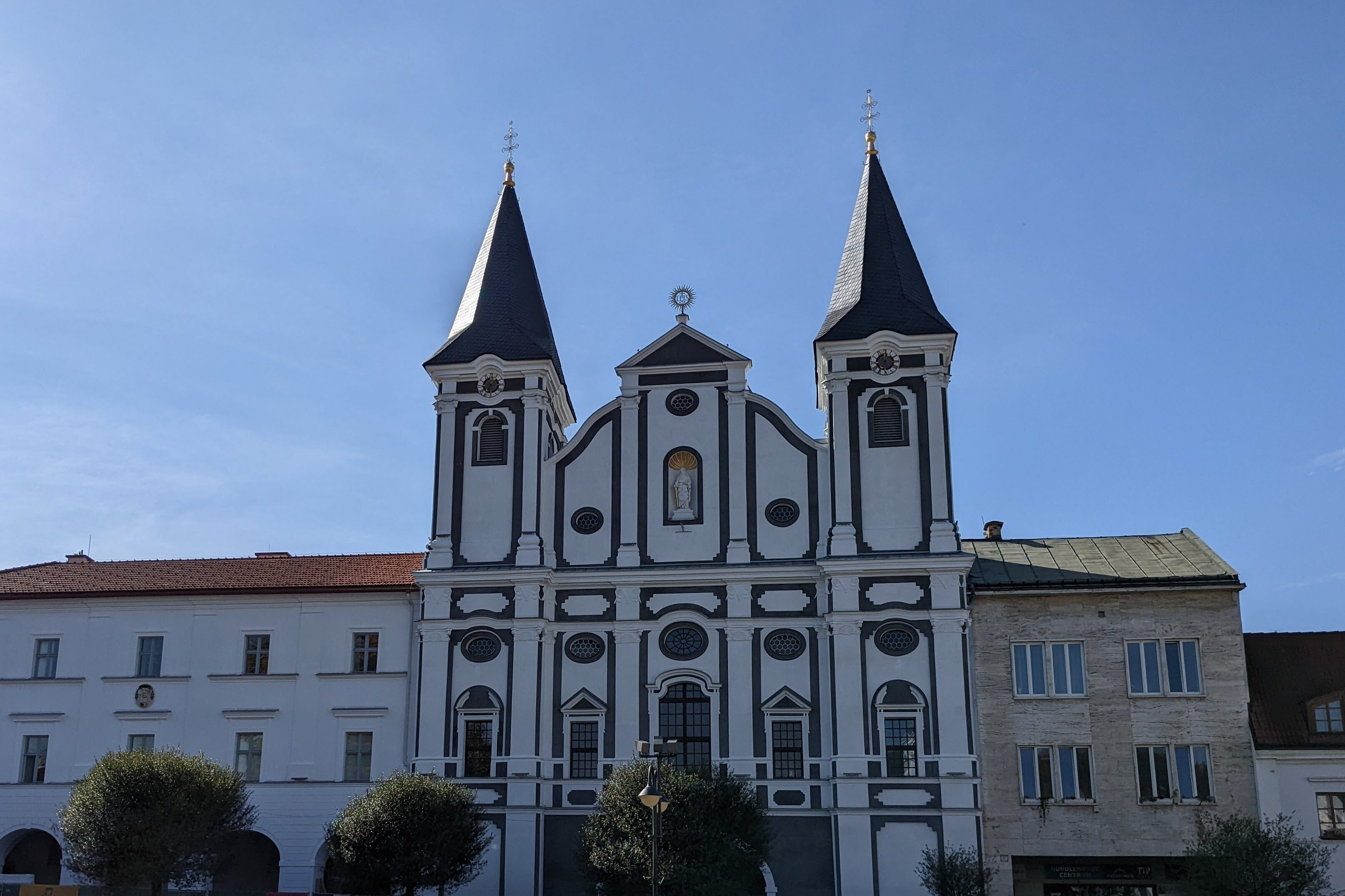
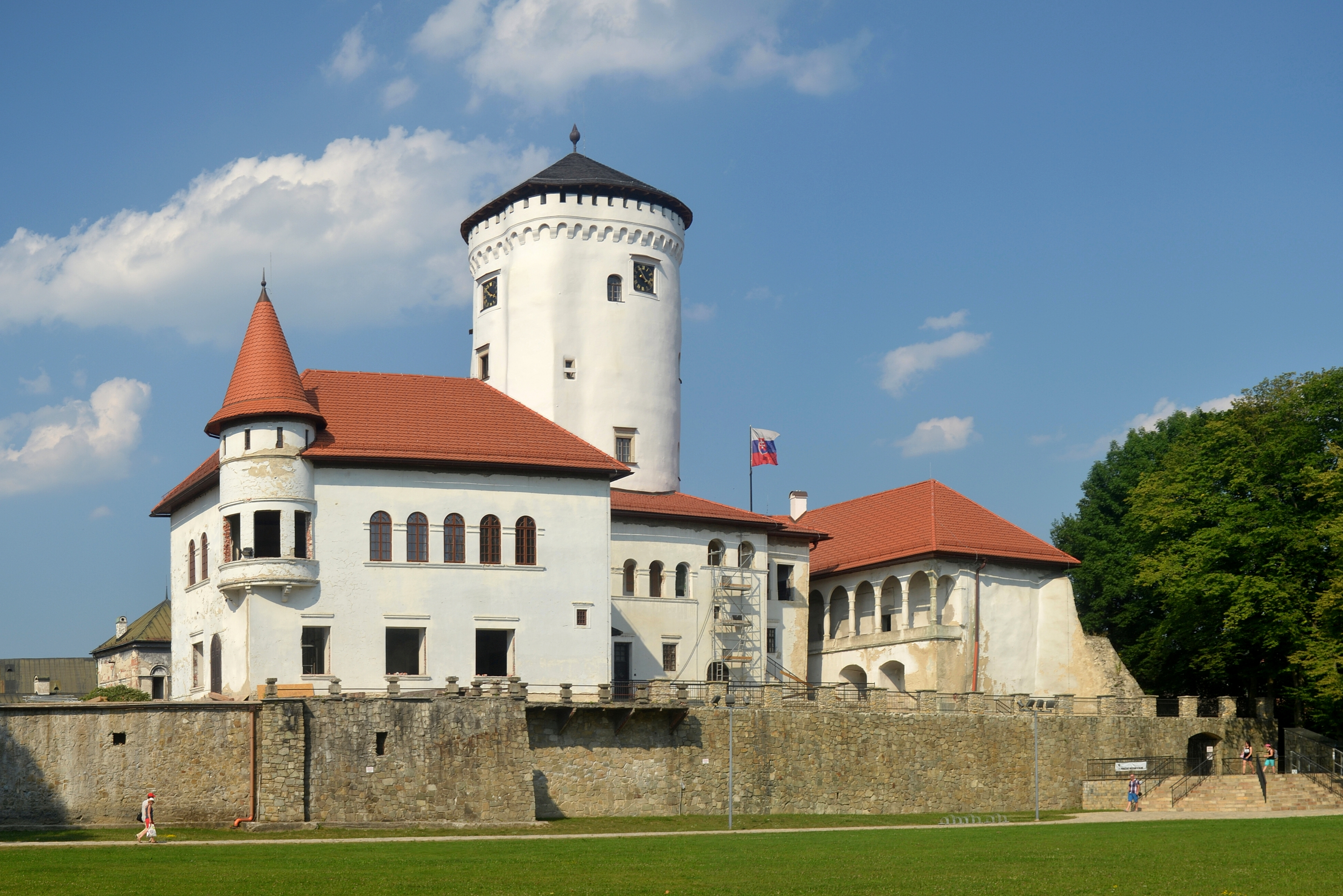
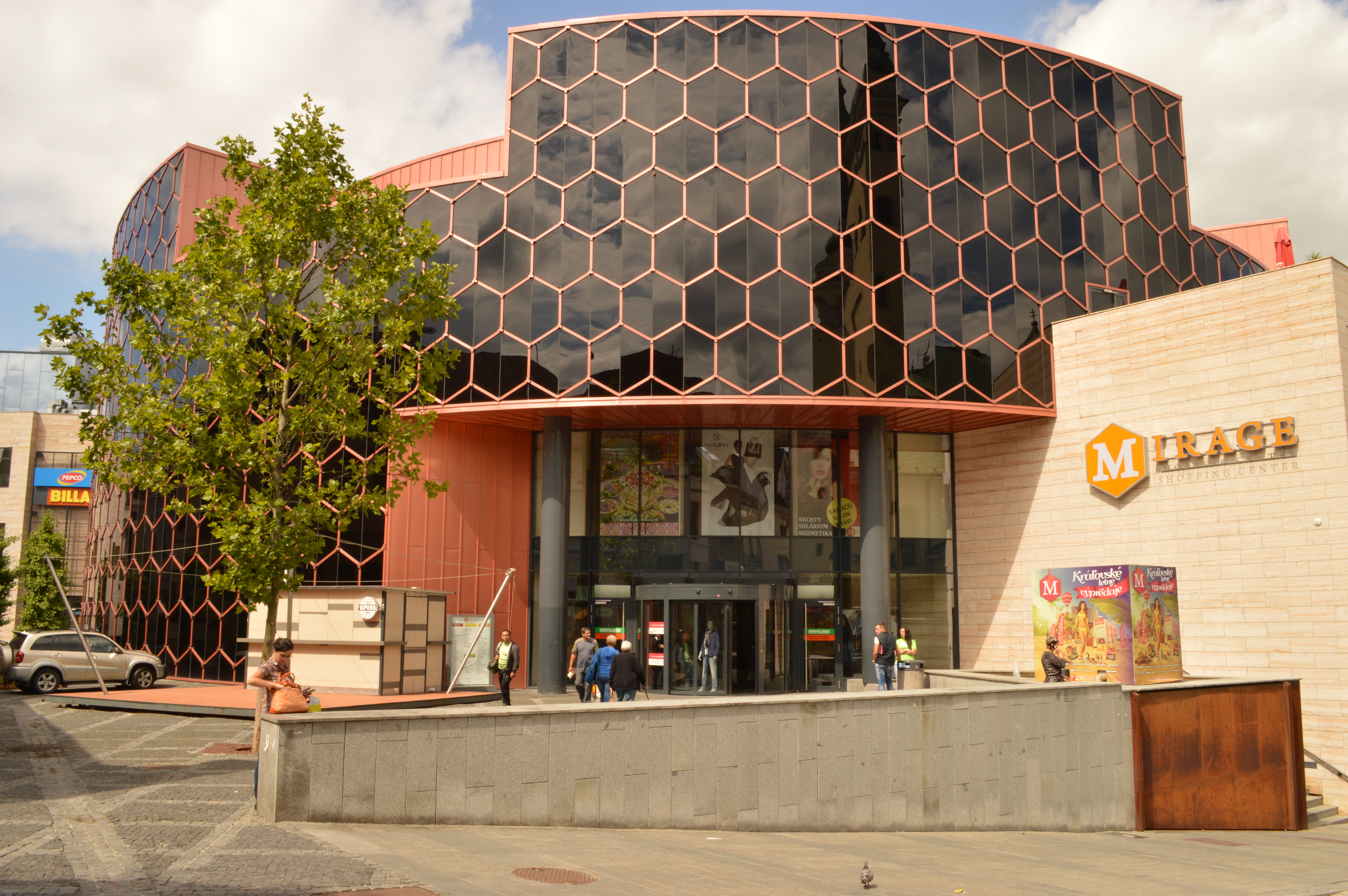
- Top: Žilina Holy Trinity Cathedral, Mariánske námestie with burgher heritage houses in Mariánske Square, Middle: An inside view of Žilina St.Stephen Church, A heritage of Žilina Town Hall, St.Paul the Apostle and Jesuit Church, Bottom: Budatín Castle, Mirage Commerce Complex Center

- Flag Coat of arms
- Nicknames: Komix City, Pearl of Váh
- Motto: Žilina, the city with face
- Location in Slovakia Žilina (Slovakia)
- Coordinates: 49°13′22″N 18°44′24″E
- Country: Slovakia
- Region: Žilina Region
- District: Žilina District
- First mentioned: 1208

Government
  - Mayor: Peter Fiabáne (Independent)

Area
  - City: 80.02 km^{2} (30.90 sq mi)
- (2022)
- Elevation: 378 m (1,240 ft)

Population (2025)
  - City: 79,873
  - Rank: 4th
  - Urban: 108,000
  - Metro: 160,000
- Demonym(s): Žilinian; Žilinčan (masculine); Žilinčanka (feminine)
- Time zone: UTC+1 (CET)
  - Summer (DST): UTC+2 (CEST)
- Postal code: 010 01
- Postal codes: 010 03, 010 04, 010 07, 010 08, 010 09, 010 14, 010 15
- Area code: +421 41
- Vehicle registration plate (until 2022): ZA
- Website: zilina.sk

Žilina (Slovak: [ˈʒilina]; Hungarian: Zsolna [ˈʒolnɒ]; German: Sillein [zɪˈlaɪn, ˈzɪlaɪn]; Polish: Żylina [ʐɨˈlina]; names in other languages) is a city in north-western Slovakia, around 170 kilometres (110 mi) from the capital Bratislava, close to both the Czech and Polish borders. It is the fourth largest city of Slovakia with a population of approximately 80,000, an important industrial center, the largest city on the Váh river, and the seat of a kraj (Žilina Region) and of an okres (Žilina District). It belongs to the Upper Váh region of tourism.

== Etymology ==
The name is derived from Slavic/Slovak word žila - a "(river) vein". Žilina means "a place with many watercourses". Alternatively, it is a secondary name derived from Žilinka river or from the name of the local people, Žilín/Žiliňane.

== History ==
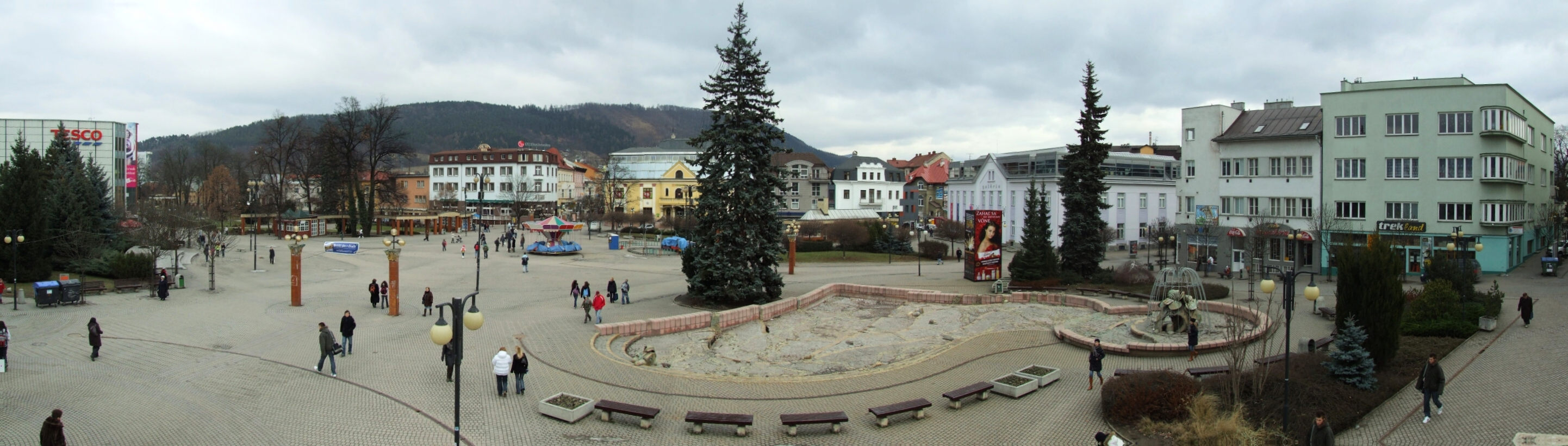
Panorama of the historic center

The area around today's Žilina was inhabited in the late Stone Age (about 20,000 BC). In the 5th century, Slavs started to move into the area. However, the first written reference to Žilina was in 1208 as terra de Selinan. From the second half of the 10th century until 1918, it was part of the Kingdom of Hungary.

In the middle of the 13th century, terra Sylna was the property of the Cseszneky de Milvány family. The city started to develop around 1300, and, according to records in 1312, it was already a town. In 1321, King Charles I made Žilina a free royal town. On 7 May 1381, King Louis I issued Privilegium pro Slavis, which made the Slav inhabitants equal to the Germans by allocating half of the seats at the city council to Slavs. The town was burned in 1431 by the Hussites.

During the 17th century, Žilina gained a position as a center of manufacturing, trade, and education, and, during the Baroque age, many monasteries and churches, as well as the Budatín Castle, were built. In the Revolutions of 1848, Slovak volunteers, part of the Imperial Army, won a battle near the city against Hungarian honveds and gardists.

The city boomed in the second half of the 19th century as new railway tracks were built: the Kassa Oderberg Railway was finished in 1872 and the railway to Bratislava (Pozsony in Hungarian) in 1883, and new factories started to spring up, such as the drapery factory Slovena (1891) and the Považie chemical works (1892).

It was one of the first municipalities to sign the Martin Declaration (30 October 1918), and until March 1919, it was the seat of the Slovak government. On 6 October 1938, shortly after the Munich Agreement, the autonomy of Slovakia within Czechoslovakia was declared in Žilina.

During the Holocaust in Slovakia, tens of thousands of Jews were deported from Žilina. Žilina was captured on 30 April 1945 by Czechoslovak and Soviet troops of the 4th Ukrainian Front, after which it again became part of Czechoslovakia. After the war, the city continued its development with many new factories, schools, and housing projects being built. It was the seat of the Žilina Region from 1949 to 1960 and again since 1996.

Today, Žilina is the fourth largest city in Slovakia, the third most important industrial center, and the seat of a university, the Žilinská univerzita (founded in 1953). Since 1990, the historical center of the city has been largely restored, and the city has built trolleybus lines.

== Geography ==
The municipality lies at an altitude of 378 metres (1,240 ft) and covers an area of 80.02 km^{2} (30.90 sq mi) (2025). It is located in the Upper Váh region (Slovak: Horné Považie) at the confluence of three rivers: Váh, flowing from the east into the south-west, Kysuca, flowing from the north and Rajčanka rivers from the south, in the Žilina Basin. The city is surrounded by these mountain ranges: Malá Fatra, Súľovské vrchy, Javorníky and Kysucká vrchovina. Protected areas nearby include the Strážov Mountains Protected Landscape Area, the Kysuce Protected Landscape Area, and the Malá Fatra National Park. There are two hydroelectric dams on the Váh river around Žilina: the Žilina dam in the east and the Hričov dam in the west.

=== Climate ===
Žilina lies in the north temperate zone and has a continental climate with four distinct seasons. It is characterized by a significant variation between hot summers and cold, snowy winters. The average temperature in July is 18 °C (64 °F), in January, −4 °C (25 °F). The average annual rainfall is 600–700 mm (23.6–27.6 in); most of the rainfall occurs in June and in the first half of July. Snow cover lasts from 60 to 80 days per year.

Climate data for Žilina
Month	Jan	Feb	Mar	Apr	May	Jun	Jul	Aug	Sep	Oct	Nov	Dec	Year
Mean daily maximum °C (°F)	0 (33)	3 (38)	8 (47)	14 (58)	20 (68)	22 (72)	25 (76)	25 (77)	20 (67)	14 (58)	6 (44)	1 (35)	13 (56)
Mean daily minimum °C (°F)	−5 (22)	−5 (23)	−1 (30)	3 (37)	8 (46)	10 (51)	12 (54)	12 (53)	9 (47)	5 (41)	0 (33)	−4 (26)	4 (39)
Average precipitation cm (inches)	2.85 (1.12)	2.67 (1.05)	3.10 (1.22)	4.08 (1.61)	4.82 (1.90)	6.99 (2.75)	6.84 (2.69)	5.19 (2.04)	4.74 (1.87)	4.19 (1.65)	3.91 (1.54)	3.42 (1.35)	52.8 (20.79)
Source: MSN Weather

== Symbol ==
The coat of arms of Žilina is a golden double-cross (so-called cross of Lorraine) with roots and two golden stars on an olive-green background. The double-cross is of Byzantine origin and stems from Cyrillic-methodic tradition. This is one of the oldest municipal coats of arms, not only in Slovakia, but in Europe. It has been used as the city's symbol since 1378.

== Population ==
Historical population
Year	Pop.	±%
1970	54,397	—
1980	70,025	+28.7%
1991	83,911	+19.8%
2001	85,400	+1.8%
2011	81,494	−4.6%
2021	82,656	+1.4%
Source: Censuses

Population statistic (10 years)
Year	1995	2005	2015	2025
Count	86,685	85,425	81,114	79,873
Difference		−1.45%	−5.04%	−1.52%

Population statistic
Year	2024	2025
Count	80,257	79,873
Difference		−0.47%

It has a population of 79,873 people (31 December 2025).

=== Ethnicity ===
Census 2021 (1+ %)
Ethnicity	Number	Fraction
Slovak	76,643	92.72%
Not found out	4840	5.85%
Czech	1284	1.55%
Total	82,656	

In year 2021 was 82,656 people by ethnicity 76,643 as Slovak, 4840 as Not found out, 1284 as Czech, 405 as Other, 174 as Romani, 163 as Russian, 158 as Hungarian, 137 as Rusyn, 133 as Ukrainian, 106 as Polish, 104 as German, 83 as Korean, 64 as Moravian, 46 as Chinese, 39 as Jewish, 34 as Vietnamese, 34 as Italian, 27 as French, 24 as Serbian, 23 as Bulgarian, 22 as Croatian, 22 as English, 16 as Irish, 16 as Canadian, 16 as Albanian, 12 as Austrian, 11 as Turkish, 8 as Silesian, 6 as Romanian, 6 as Greek and 1 as Iranian.

Note on population: The difference values of population numbers in the table "Population statistic" and in the sections "Ethnicity" & "Religion" is caused by the use of various statistical methods.

=== Religion ===
Census 2021 (1+ %)
Religion	Number	Fraction
Roman Catholic Church	47,819	57.85%
None	24,034	29.08%
Not found out	5643	6.83%
Evangelical Church	2339	2.83%
Total	82,656	

In year 2021 was 82,656 people by religion 47,819 from Roman Catholic Church, 24,034 from None, 5643 from Not found out, 2339 from Evangelical Church, 548 from Greek Catholic Church, 339 from Christian Congregations in Slovakia, 325 from Other, 291 from Ad hoc movements, 263 from Other and not ascertained christian church, 175 from Eastern Orthodox Church, 156 from Buddhism, 148 from Jehovah's Witnesses, 111 from Church of the Brethren, 108 from Calvinist Church, 91 from Paganism and natural spirituality, 49 from Islam, 32 from Apostolic Church, 31 from Seventh-day Adventist Church, 28 from Jewish community, 27 from Old Catholic Church, 23 from United Methodist Church, 21 from Baptists Church, 20 from Hinduism, 18 from Church of Jesus Christ of Latter-day Saints, 13 from Czechoslovak Hussite Church and 4 from Bahá'i Community.

== Economy ==
Žilina is the main industrial hub of the upper Váh river basin region, with a fast-growing economy as north-west Slovakia's business center with large retail and construction sectors.

By far the biggest and most important employer is the Korean car maker Kia Motors. By 2009, the plant produced 300,000 cars a year and had up to 3,000 employees. Kia Motors' direct investment in the Žilina car plant amounts to over 1.5 billion USD. In 2009, the Žilina car plant produced Kia Cee'd, Kia Sportage, and Hyundai ix35 car models. Kia Motors is further upgrading its capacity to be ready to produce engines for a sister company, Hyundai, located at Nošovice in the Czech Republic with a planned investment of US$200 million.

Žilina is also the seat of the biggest Slovak construction and transportation engineering company, Vahostav. The chemical industry is represented by Považské chemické závody and Tento, a paper mill company. Siemens Mobility also has an engineering center in Žilina.

== Main sights ==
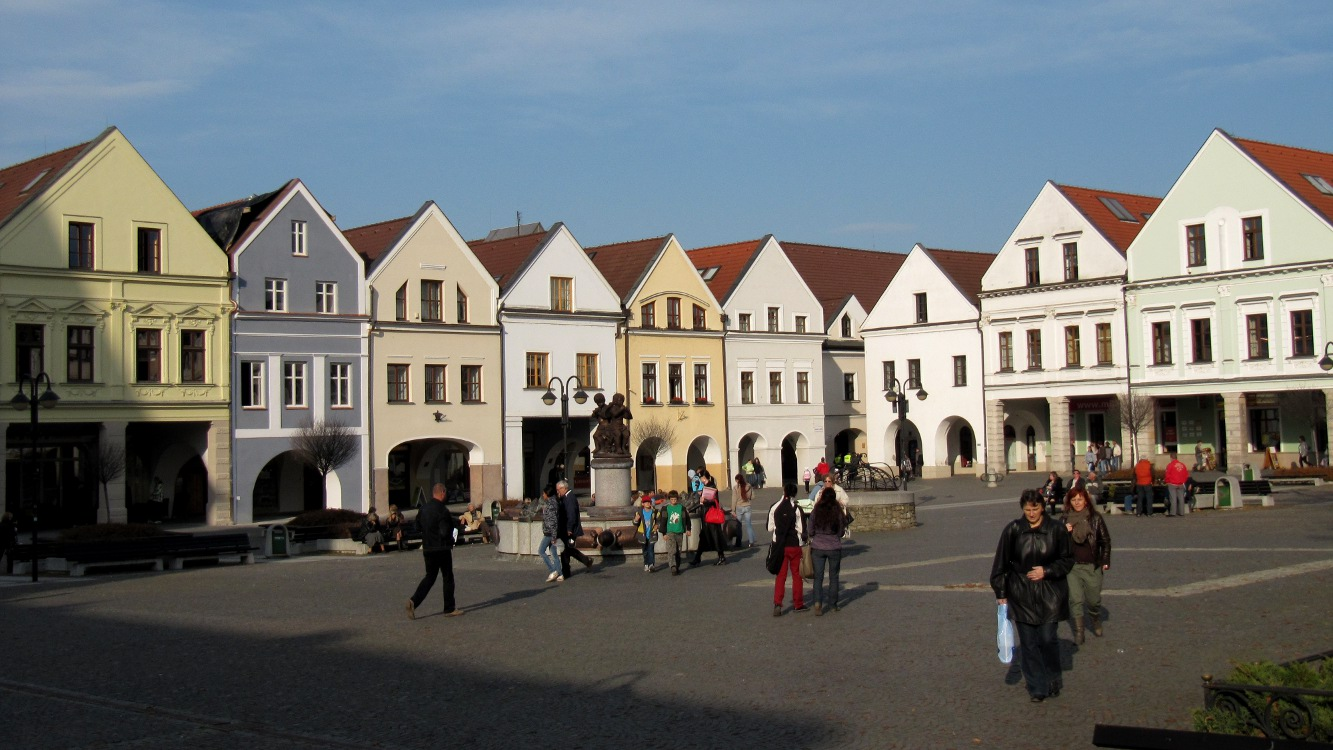
Mariánske námestie with burgher houses

Budatín Castle

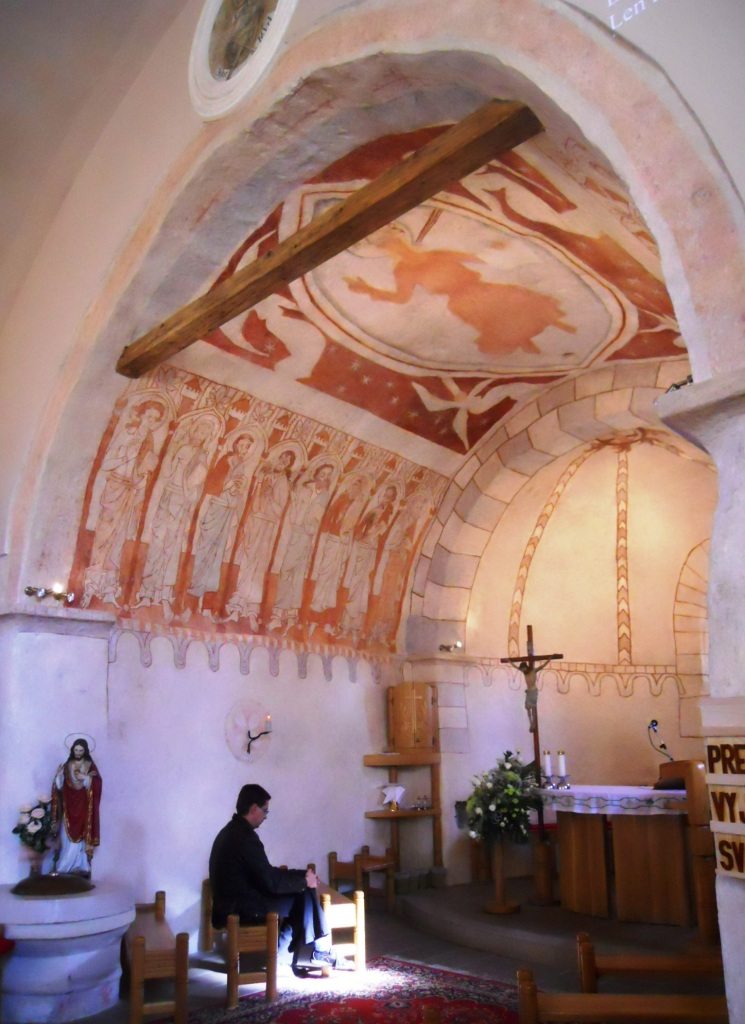
Frescoes inside the church of St Stephen the King

The historical center of the city, reconstructed in the early 1990s, is protected as a city monument reserve (Slovak: Mestská pamiatková rezervácia). It is centered on the Mariánske námestie and Andrej Hlinka squares. The Mariánske námestie square has 106 arcade passages and 44 burgher houses along the whole square. It is dominated by the Church of St. Paul the Apostle, the old building of the city council, and the baroque statue of the Virgin Mary. Nearby is the Church of the Holy Trinity, a sacral building built around 1400, which is since February 2008 the cathedral of the Diocese of Žilina.

The Church of Saint Stephen the King (Slovak: Kostol Sv. Štefana kráľa) is the oldest architectural relic of town Zilina, located just 1 kilometre (0.6 miles) southwest from the center. It is one of the first Romanesque churches in Slovakia, dating back to the years 1200–1250, according to the experts. The legend goes that the Hungarian King István I himself ordered to build it. Valuable is the inner decoration of the church. Wall paintings originate from approximately 1260; in 1950, they were discovered and later on restored by the Žilina fine artist Mojmír Vlkoláček. Nowadays, it is a popular place for wedding ceremonies.

Other landmarks around the city include:

- Budatín Castle, housing Považie Museum with its tinker trade exhibition
- The wooden Roman Catholic church of St. George in the Trnové section (one of the few outside north-eastern Slovakia)
- The Orthodox synagogue, which now houses the Museum of Jewish culture
- The New Synagogue, now a cultural centre

The city is a starting point for various locations of western and eastern Slovakia, including hiking trails into the Lesser Fatra and Greater Fatra mountains. Other locations of interest include Bojnice Castle, Strečno, Orava region, and the villages of Čičmany and Vlkolínec.

== Culture ==
Žilina hosts several cultural institutions:

- Mestské divadlo Žilina (Žilina City Theater)
- Rosenfeld Palace (Žilina city cultural centre Rosenfeld Palace)
- Považská galéria umenia v Žiline (Považie galerie of contemporary art)
- Považské múzeum (Považie museum), situated in the Budatín castle, but also running Strečno castle, Palace in Bytča,

open-air museum Čičmany, and manor-house in Divinka

- Bábkové divadlo Žilina (Žilina Puppet Theatre)
- Múzeum židovskej kultúry (Museum of Jewish culture)
- Štátny komorný orchester Žilina (Slovak Sinfonietta Žilina)
- Krajská knižnica v Žiline (Regional Library in Žilina)
- Stanica Žilina-Záriečie (Cultural Center Stanica)
- Nová synagóga Žilina (New Synagogue Žilina)

Žilina is also home to two multi-3D digital theaters, in Mirage Shopping Centre - Ster Century Cinemas and Cinemax MAX in Max Shopping Centre OC Max Solinky.

The city hosts several cultural events:

- Žilina Cultural Summer
- Fest Anca - Animated film festival
- Žilina Literary festival
- KIOSK – festival of new Slovak theater
- Allegretto Žilina – International Music Festival
- Puppet Žilina
- Jánošik's Days

== Sport ==
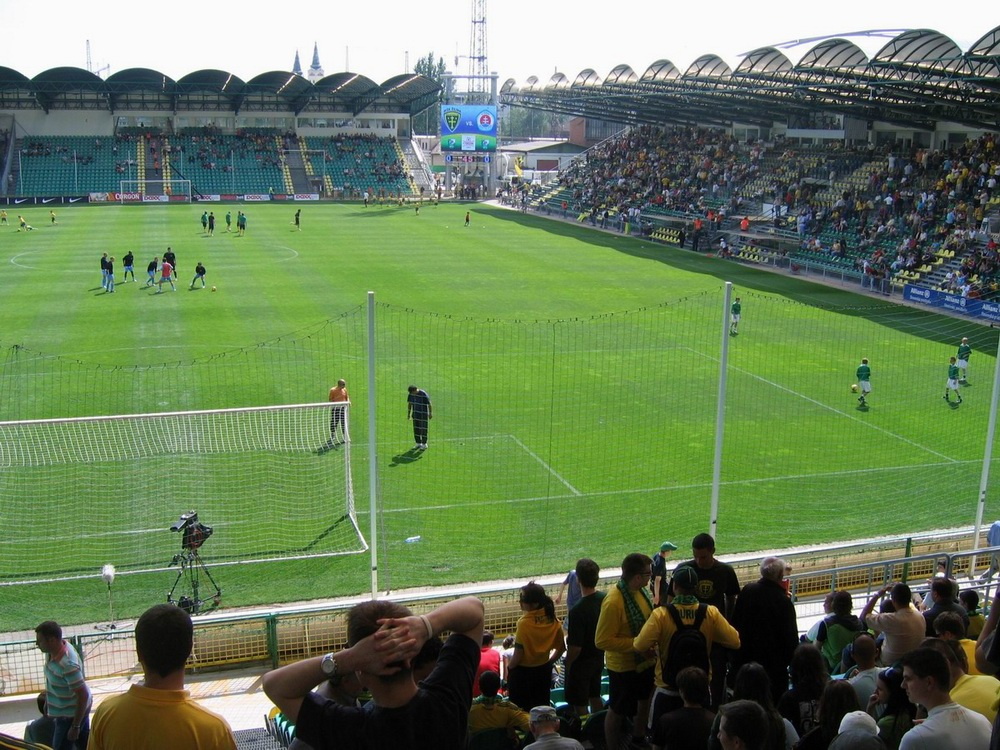
Štadión pod Dubňom

Football (soccer) club MŠK Žilina plays in the top Slovak division Slovak First Football League and is one of the most successful teams in recent years, having won five domestic titles and been runners-up three times between 2001 and 2010. The team's colors are yellow and green, taken from the city's flag. Home games are played at the Stadium Pod Dubňom, which is situated at the edge of the city center in the neighborhood of the ice hockey stadium. They played in the 2010-11 UEFA Champions League in the group stage for the first time in their history.

Ice hockey club MsHK Žilina plays in the Slovak Extraliga. They have won one domestic title so far.

Slovak professional road bicycle racer for World Tour team Bora-Hansgrohe, three-time world champion Peter Sagan, was born in Žilina in 1990, and is considered one of cycling's most promising young talents, having earned many prestigious victories in his early twenties. He was the winner of the points classification in the Tour de France from 2012 to 2016; as a result, Sagan became the first rider to win the classification in his first five attempts. In 2015, he was also the first Slovak cyclist to win the UCI Road World Championships.

== Government ==
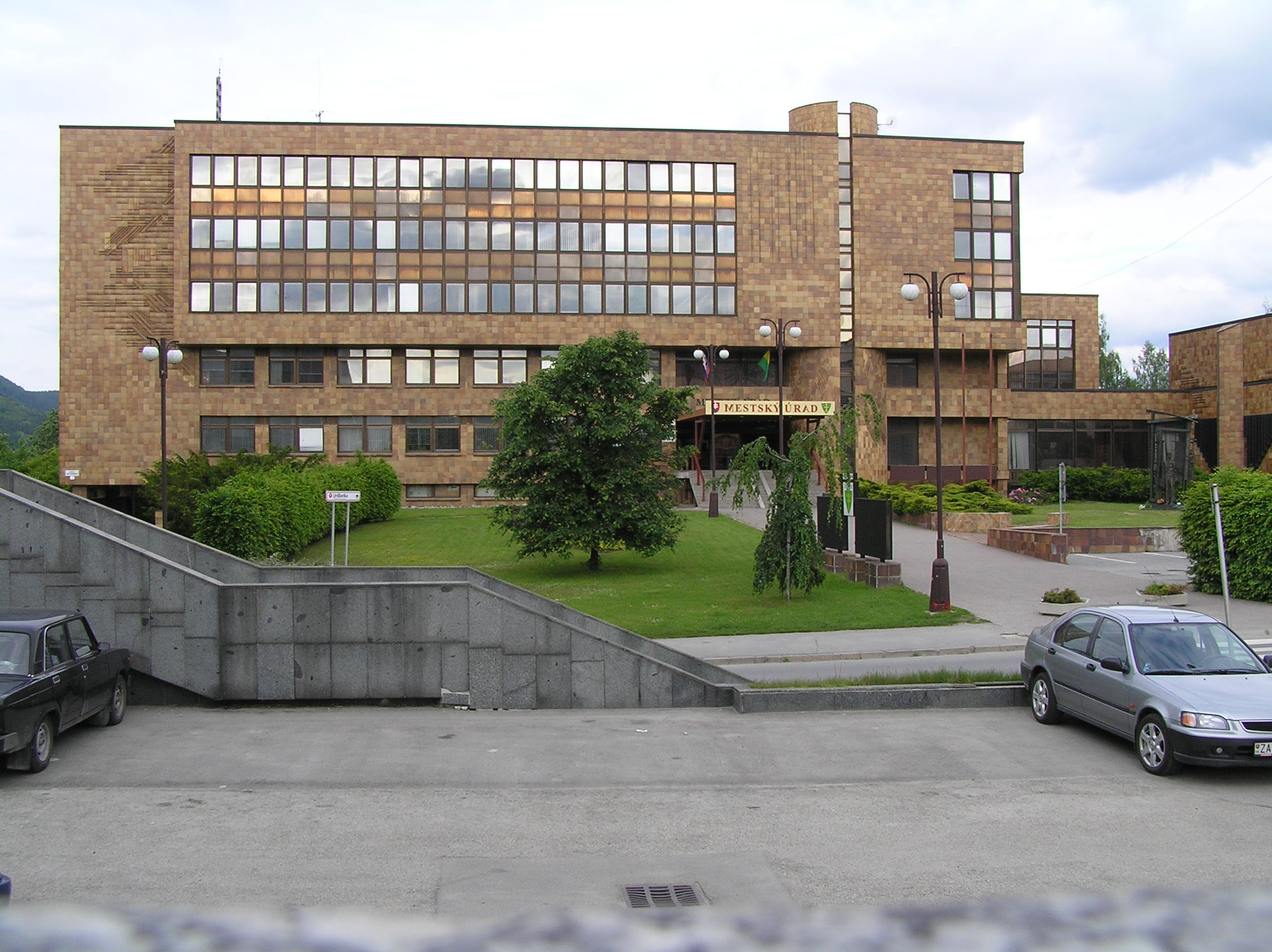
Žilina City Council

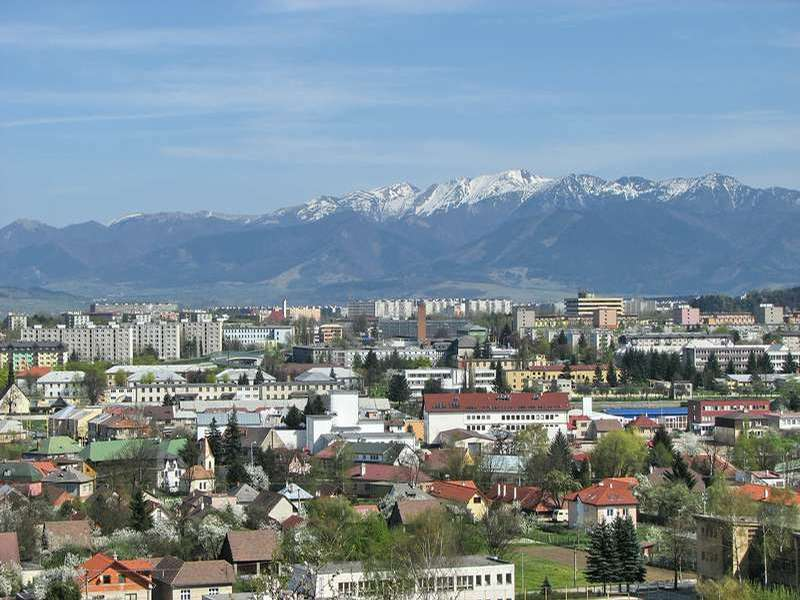
View over Žilina

The city is governed by a mayor (Slovak: primátor) and a city council (Slovak: mestské zastupiteľstvo). The mayor is the head of the city and its chief executive, with a four-year term of office. The current mayor is Peter Fiabáne. The council is the city's legislative body, with 31 councillors. The last municipal election was held in 2014, and councillors are elected to four-year terms, concurrent with the mayor's. Žilina is divided into eight electoral districts, consisting of the following neighborhoods:

- Staré mesto, Hliny I-IV, Hliny VIII (5 councillors)
- Hliny V-VII, Bôrik (4 councillors)
- Solinky (5 councillors)
- Vlčince (6 councillors)
- Hájik (3 councillors)
- Bytčica, Rosinky, Trnové, Mojšová Lúčka (2 councillors)
- Závodie, Bánová, Strážov, Žilinská Lehota (2 councillors)
- Budatín, Považský Chlmec, Vranie, Brodno, Zádubnie, Zástranie (3 councillors)

Žilina is the capital of one of eight considerably autonomous Regions of Slovakia. It is also the capital of a smaller district. The Žilina District (Slovak: okres Žilina) is nested within the Žilina Region.

The city also hosts a regional branch of the National Bank of Slovakia.

== Education ==
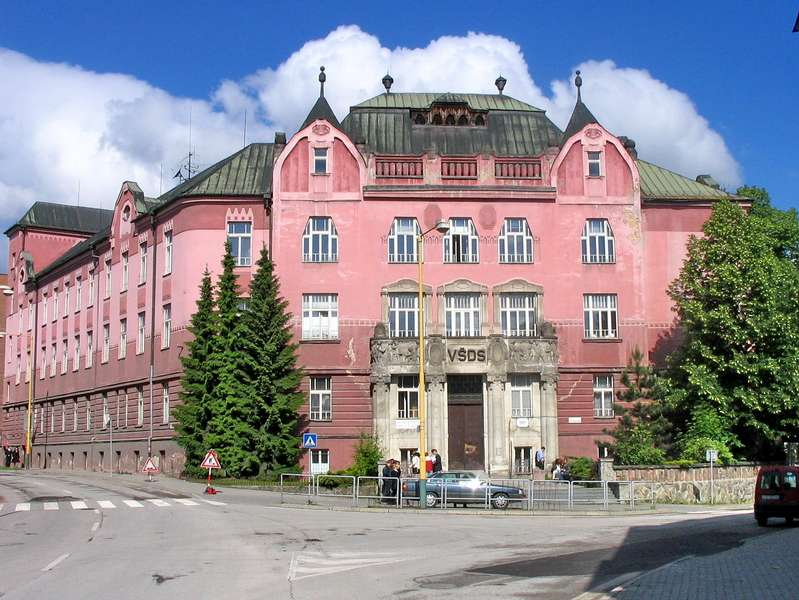
former building of Žilina University - Faculty of Nature Science

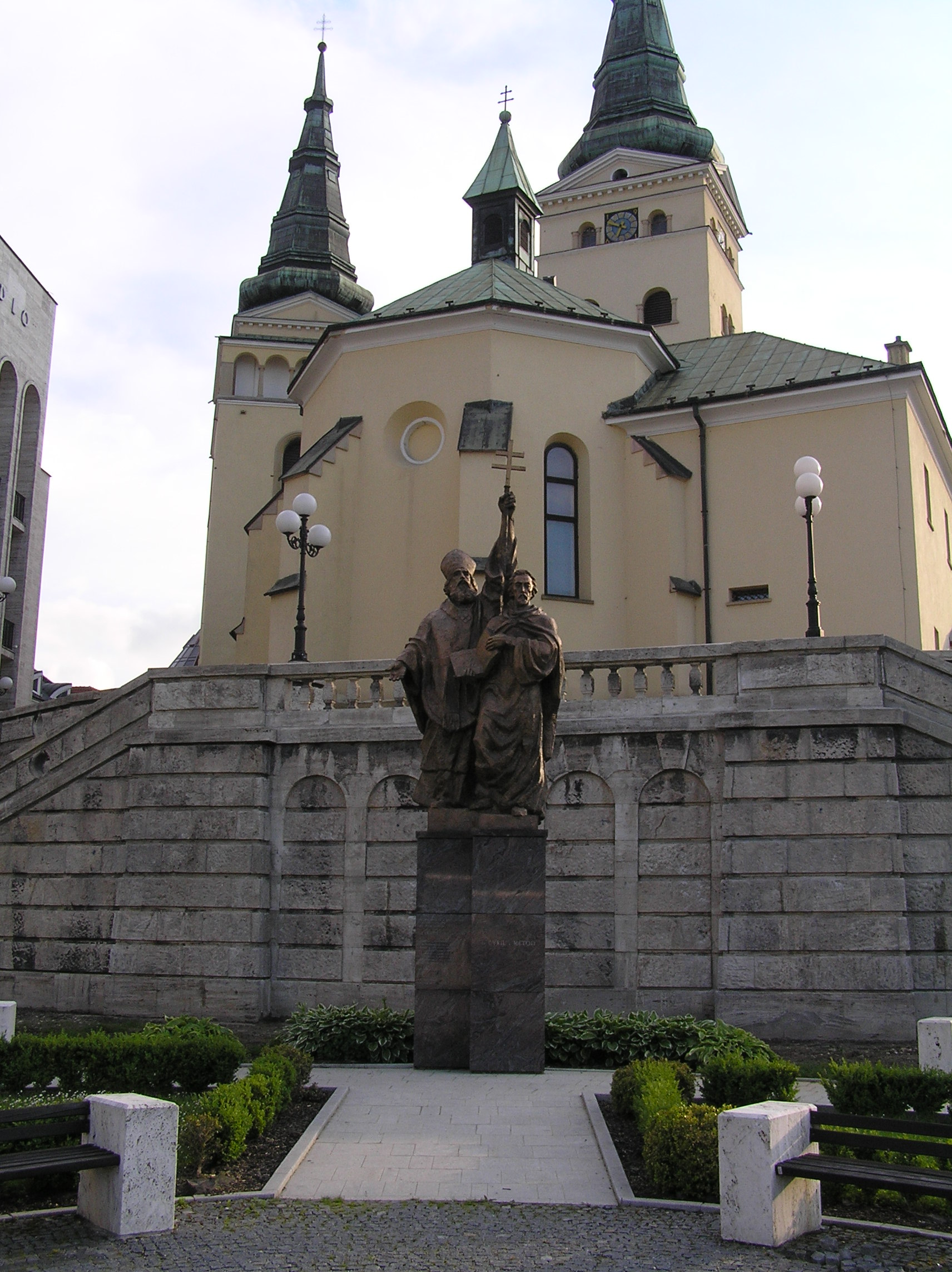
Memorial dedicated to Saints Cyril and Methodius, with Holy Trinity Church in the background

The city is home to the University of Žilina, which has seven faculties and 12,402 students, including 625 doctoral students.

There are 18 public primary schools, one private primary school, and three church primary schools. Overall, they enroll 7,484 pupils. The city's system of secondary education (some middle schools and all high schools) consists of eight gymnasia with 3,514 students, ten specialized high schools with 3,696 students, and nine vocational schools with 4,870 students.

== Transport ==
The city is an important international road junction, and Žilina railway station is a major rail junction.

Roads and railways connect the city with Bratislava and Prievidza in the south, Čadca in the north, and Martin in the east. The construction of the D1, and D3 motorways and their feeders continues towards Žilina.

The city is also served by international Žilina Airport, which is about 10 kilometres (6 miles) away from the city center.

Public transport within the city is operated by DPMZ and consists of buses (since 1949) and trolleybuses (since 1994).

Night bus services started in Žilina in 1970 with the introduction of one route, the 50, which continues to operate as the sole night bus in the city, operating from 22:55 to 04:22. Route 50 makes a circuitous route of all major residential areas, and includes a stop at Železničná stanica, the principal railway station.

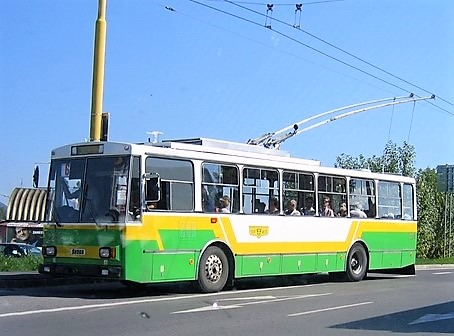
Trolleybus transport

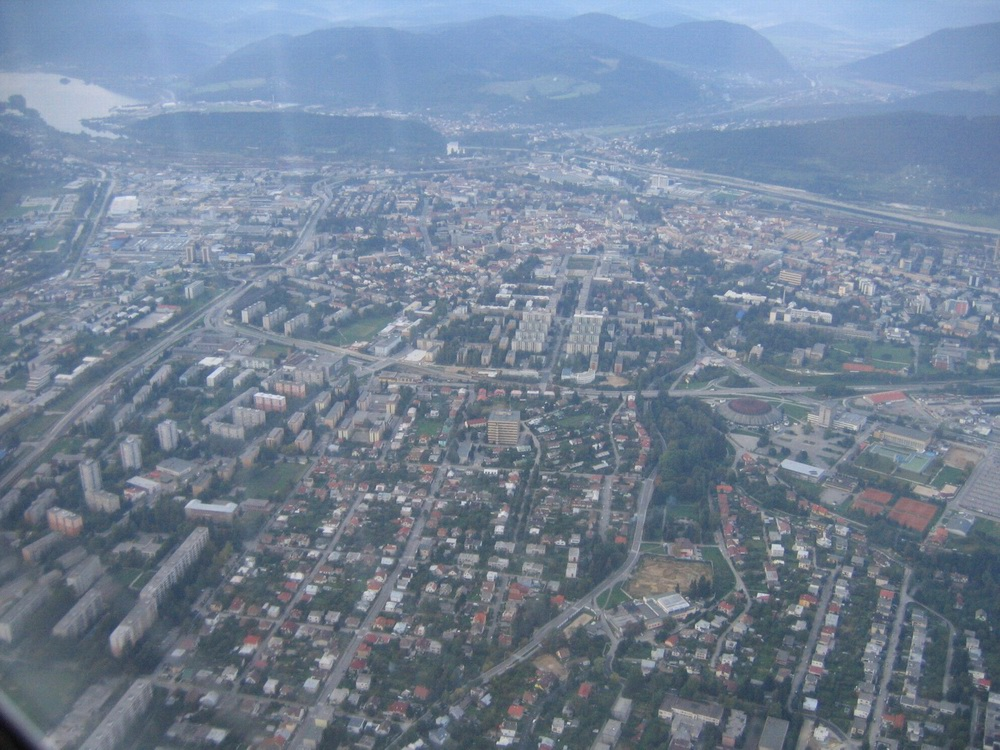
Aerial view of Žilina

== Notable people ==
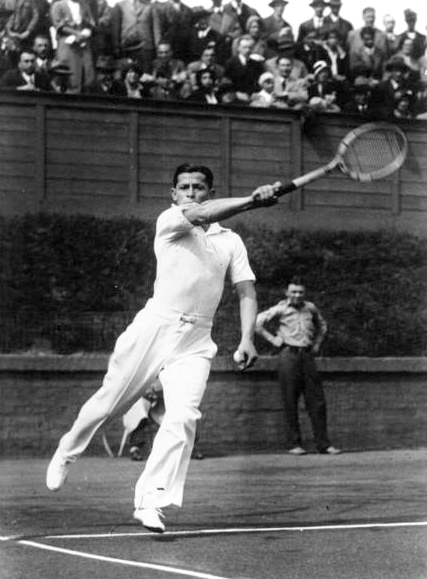
Ladislav Hecht

- AYA (band)
- Zuzana Babiaková
- Pavol Bajza
- Peter Baláž
- Martin Gamboš, footballer
- Štefan Beniač (1869–1942), Slovak priest, preacher, and publicist
- Tomáš Bezdeda (born 1985, here), singer
- Peter Cehlárik (born 1995), Slovak hockey player
- Jakab Cseszneky de Csesznek et Visk, medieval magnate
- Martin Dúbravka, footballer
- Martin Ďurica, footballer
- Ľubomír Feldek (born 1936, here), Slovak poet
- Ján Franek (born 1960, here)
- Ľudovít Fulla
- Stanislav Griga (born 1961, here), football coach
- Ladislav Hecht (1909–2004), tennis player
- Tomáš Hellebrandt, (born 1982), Slovak economist and politician
- Peter Hoferica, footballer
- Anton Hrnko (born 1955, here), historian and politician
- Tomáš Hubočan, footballer
- Miroslav Hýll, footballer
- Juraj Jánošík, Slovak national hero
- Michael Kolář, cyclist
- Karol Križan, ice hockey player
- Dušan Kuciak
- Martin Kuciak
- Branislav Labant
- Gwido Langer
- Dávid Leimdörfer (1851–1922), rabbi and author
- Vladimír Leitner (born 1974), association football player
- Nela Lopušanová (born 2008), ice hockey player
- Ján Mikolaj (born 1953), Minister of Education of Slovakia (2006–2010)
- Marek Mintál (born 1977), association football player
- Juraj Okoličány (1943–2008), ice hockey referee
- Roman Ondak
- Emil Pažický
- Peter Pekarík, football player
- Ronald Petrovický, ice hockey player
- Lukáš Pohůnek, conductor
- Dárius Rusnák (born 1959), ice hockey player
- Branislav Rzeszoto (born 1975), association football player
- Juraj Sagan (born 1988), cyclist
- Peter Sagan (born 1990), cyclist
- Vanesa Šelmeková (born 2007), figure skater
- Ján Slota (born 1953), MP (1992–2002, 2006–2012), Mayor of Žilina (1992–2006)
- Ľuboš Šoška (born 1977), slalom canoeist
- Peter Šoška (born 1976), slalom canoeist
- Martin Šulík (born 1962), actor and movie director
- Miroslav Šustek, writer
- Viktor Tausk, psychoanalyst
- Jozef Vengloš
- Radoslav Židek, snowboarder, first Slovak medal winner at the Winter Olympic Games

== Twin towns – sister cities ==
Žilina is twinned with:

- Bielsko-Biała, Poland
- Changchun, China
- Dnipro, Ukraine
- Essen, Belgium
- Frýdek-Místek, Czech Republic
- Kikinda, Serbia
- Plzeň, Czech Republic
- Prague 15 (Prague), Czech Republic
- Třinec, Czech Republic
