= Solinky =

Coordinates: 49.2089°N 18.7762°E

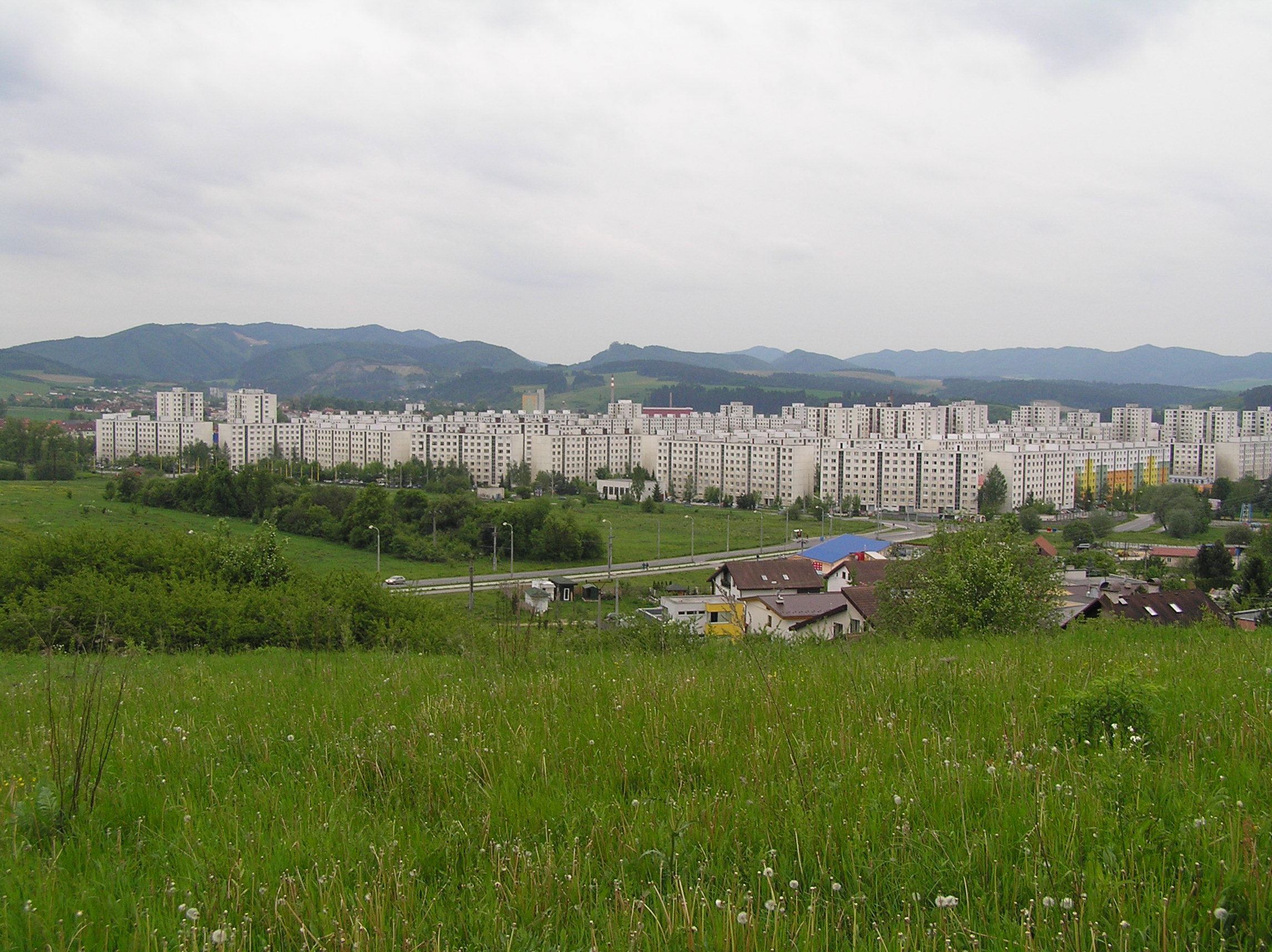
Solinky

Solinky is a town section of Žilina located in northwestern Slovakia, with about 10,000 inhabitants. The residential area consist mainly of low standard flats, although some modern houses have recently been built. There is a newly (2003) built Catholic church, as well as convenience stores and pubs. The supermarkets METRO, TESCO, LIDL and shopping center MAX are also located nearby.

Solinky is home to famous Slovak personalities such as Žilina's ex-mayor Ján Slota and pop singer Tomáš Bezdeda.
