= Rosina, Slovakia =

Village and municipality in Slovakia

Rosina
- Municipality
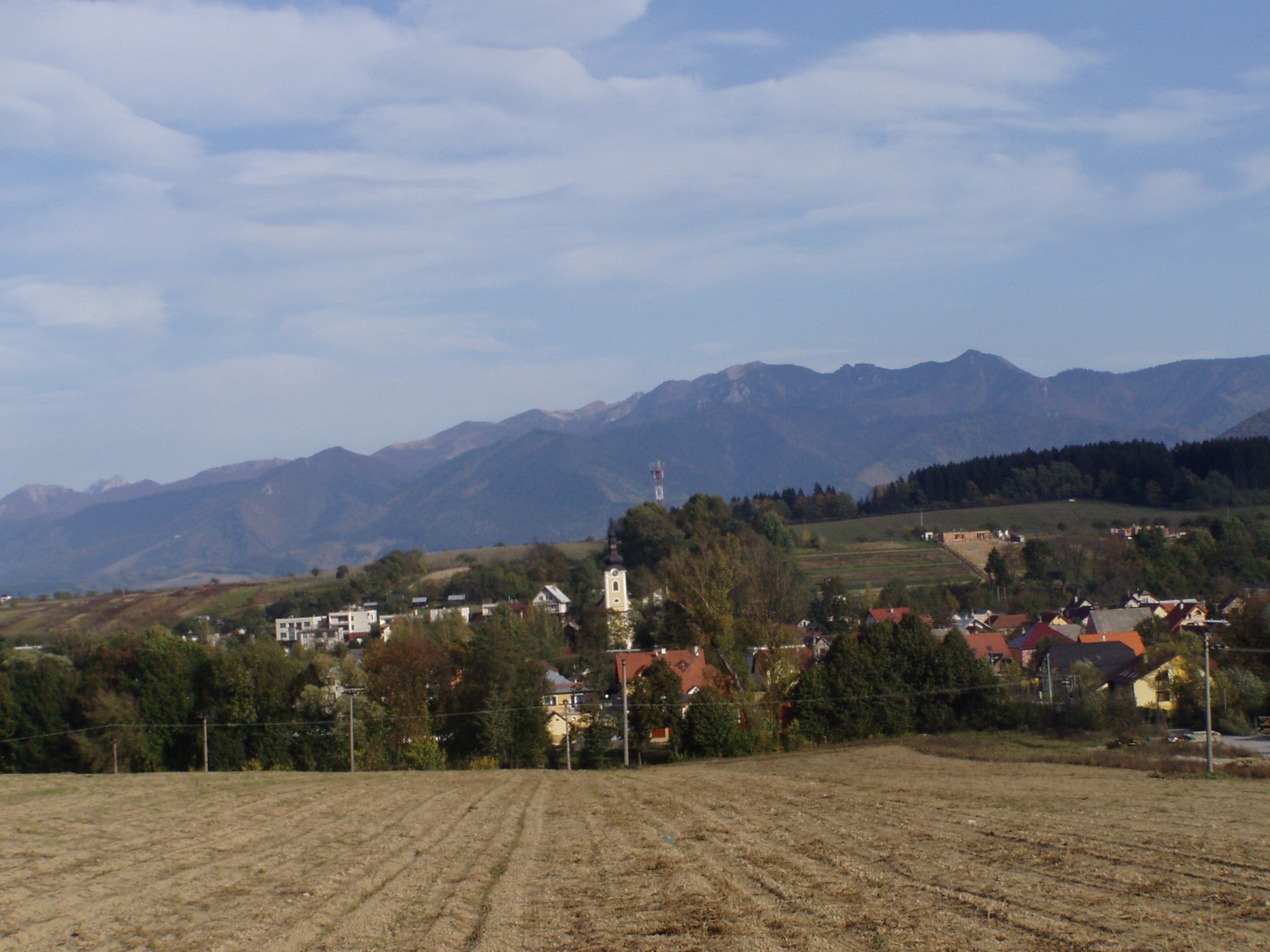

- Flag

- Location of Rosina in the Žilina Region Location of Rosina in Slovakia
- Coordinates: 49°11′N 18°46′E
- Country: Slovakia
- Region: Žilina Region
- District: Žilina District
- First mentioned: 1341

Area
  - Total: 7.32 km^{2} (2.83 sq mi)
- Elevation: 401 m (1,316 ft)

Population (2025)
  - Total: 3,366
- Time zone: UTC+1 (CET)
  - Summer (DST): UTC+2 (CEST)
- Postal code: 132 2
- Area code: +421 41
- Vehicle registration plate (until 2022): ZA
- Website: www.obecrosina.sk

Rosina (Hungarian: Harmatos) is a village and municipality in Žilina District in the Žilina Region of northern Slovakia. It has 900 houses with 3,200 people (2016). In 2003 there lived 2,888 people.

== History ==
Unofficially the first mention is in year 1135 when there were 16 shacks and a priest Paulus Rosinaj was preaching Christianity as they were still heathens.

Another unofficial record is from 1208 along with a village Banova. Rosina then belonged under Strecno castle's domain until the year 1848 with exception of years 1685 – 1773 when it belonged to jesuits in Žilina.

In official historical records the village was first mentioned in 1341. (it is called Rozina, 1386 Rosna, 1416 Rossina, 1508 Rosyna, 1598 Rozzina, 1808 Rosyna; magyar Roszina, Harmatos)

First parsonage was built in 1514 and first wooden church in 1645 thanks to Ladislav Révai.

In 1598 there were 28 houses.

== Geography ==
The municipality lies at an altitude of 401 metres (1,316 ft) and covers an area of 7.32 km^{2} (2.83 sq mi) (2025).

== Population ==
Population statistic (10 years)
Year	1995	2005	2015	2025
Count	2602	2869	3139	3366
Difference		+10.26%	+9.41%	+7.23%

Population statistic
Year	2024	2025
Count	3374	3366
Difference		−0.23%

It has a population of 3366 people (31 December 2025).

=== Ethnicity ===
Census 2021 (1+ %)
Ethnicity	Number	Fraction
Slovak	3235	97.17%
Not found out	75	2.25%
Total	3329	

In year 2021 was 3329 people by ethnicity 3235 as Slovak, 75 as Not found out, 33 as Czech, 19 as Other, 5 as Italian, 5 as Russian, 5 as Polish, 5 as Hungarian, 4 as Ukrainian, 3 as German, 2 as Jewish, 2 as Vietnamese, 2 as Rusyn, 1 as Irish and 1 as English.

Note on population: The difference values of population numbers in the table "Population statistic" and in the sections "Ethnicity" & "Religion" is caused by the use of various statistical methods.

=== Religion ===
Census 2021 (1+ %)
Religion	Number	Fraction
Roman Catholic Church	2447	73.51%
None	681	20.46%
Not found out	78	2.34%
Evangelical Church	35	1.05%
Total	3329	

In year 2021 was 3329 people by religion 2447 from Roman Catholic Church, 681 from None, 78 from Not found out, 35 from Evangelical Church, 19 from Greek Catholic Church, 15 from Ad hoc movements, 14 from Christian Congregations in Slovakia, 12 from Other and not ascertained christian church, 7 from Other, 6 from Church of the Brethren, 5 from Buddhism, 4 from Calvinist Church, 4 from Eastern Orthodox Church, 1 from Paganism and natural spirituality and 1 from Islam.

== Church of Saint Katherine of Alexandria ==
Located in Rosina, the Church of Saint Katherine of Alexandria is a parish church. Built in 1776 in baroque style, it is sacred to Saint Catherine of Alexandria. The church has one nave, it also has a sacristan and citadel with a roof in an onion-like shape. Its facade is articulated with allette. Inside is the main altar in the baroque style from the second half of the eighteenth century with a picture of Saint Katherine. Paintings inside are by Jozef Hanulla. After 1970, a new liturgical device was made. The old pulpit was removed as well as some of aisle small altars.

The church is adorned with several sculptures, for example Saint Karol Boromejský and Saint Jan Nepomucky on the main altar, and a sculpture of the Virgin Mary on the aisle altar. Under the church there is a crypt, which has an entrance under the choir. It was opened around the year 1850. Beside work on new pavage this entrance was built up.

In front of church entrance there is a stone monument, as a memorial to the people who fell in World War II; their names are engraved on it. To the right of church there is a grave under lime, where former chaplain is buried. He acted in the village when cholera was spreading. From the year 2006 new Chapel of Virgin Mary of Lurdia is standing next to the church.
