= Cultural Heritage Monuments of Slovakia =

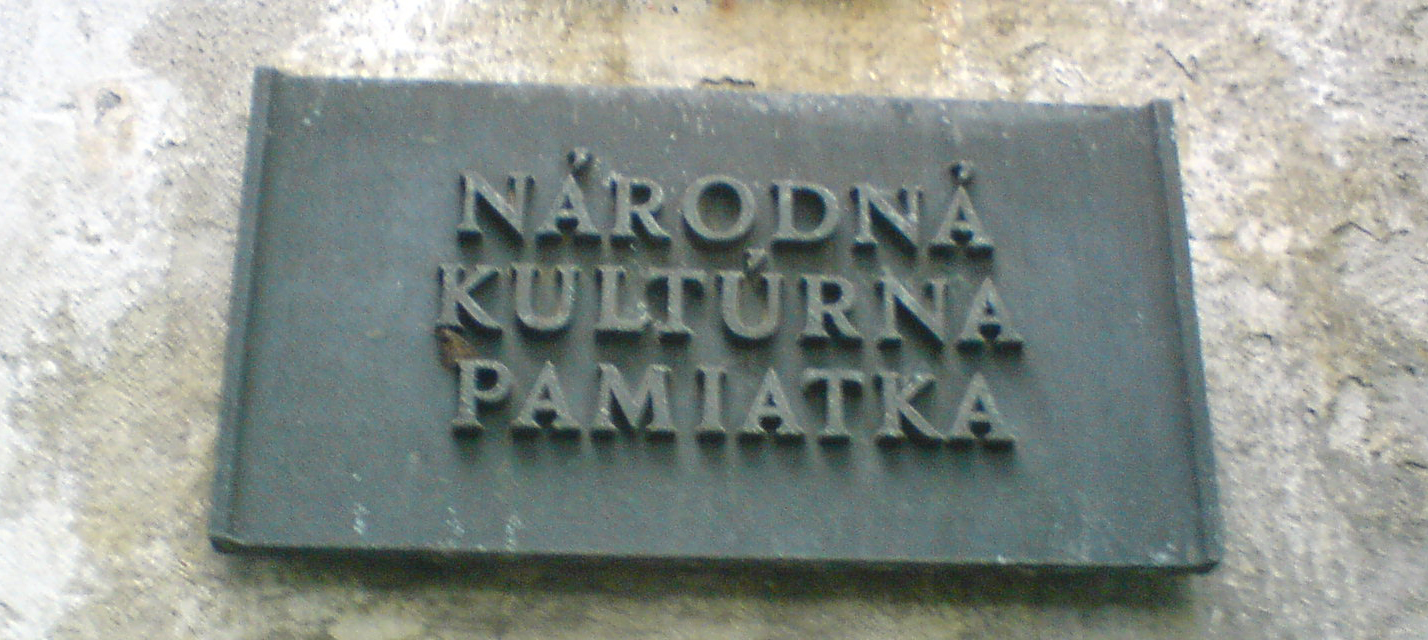
National Cultural Heritage Monument plaque at Orava Castle

The cultural heritage of Slovakia is protected and promoted in accordance with the Law on the protection of monuments and historic sites (2002). Article 2 defines monuments and historic sites as those movable and immovable cultural properties that have been declared as national Cultural Heritage Monuments (Slovak: Národná kultúrna pamiatka (NKP)). Cultural Heritage Monuments are declared by the Ministry of Culture after proposal by the Monuments Board (Article 15). A central register is kept by the Monuments Board, comprising a register of (1) movable cultural heritage monuments; (2) immovable cultural heritage monuments (Register nehnuteľných NKP); (3) protected historic reserves (Register Pamiatkových rezervácií); (4) protected historic zones (Register Pamiatkových zón) (Article 22). As of 31 December 2010, 14,818 cultural monuments have been declared. In addition, as of January 2003, 2,828 town reserves and 757 folk architecture reserves have been declared.

== See also ==
- History of Slovakia
- Culture of Slovakia
- List of heritage registers
