= Juraj Jánošík =

Slovak outlaw

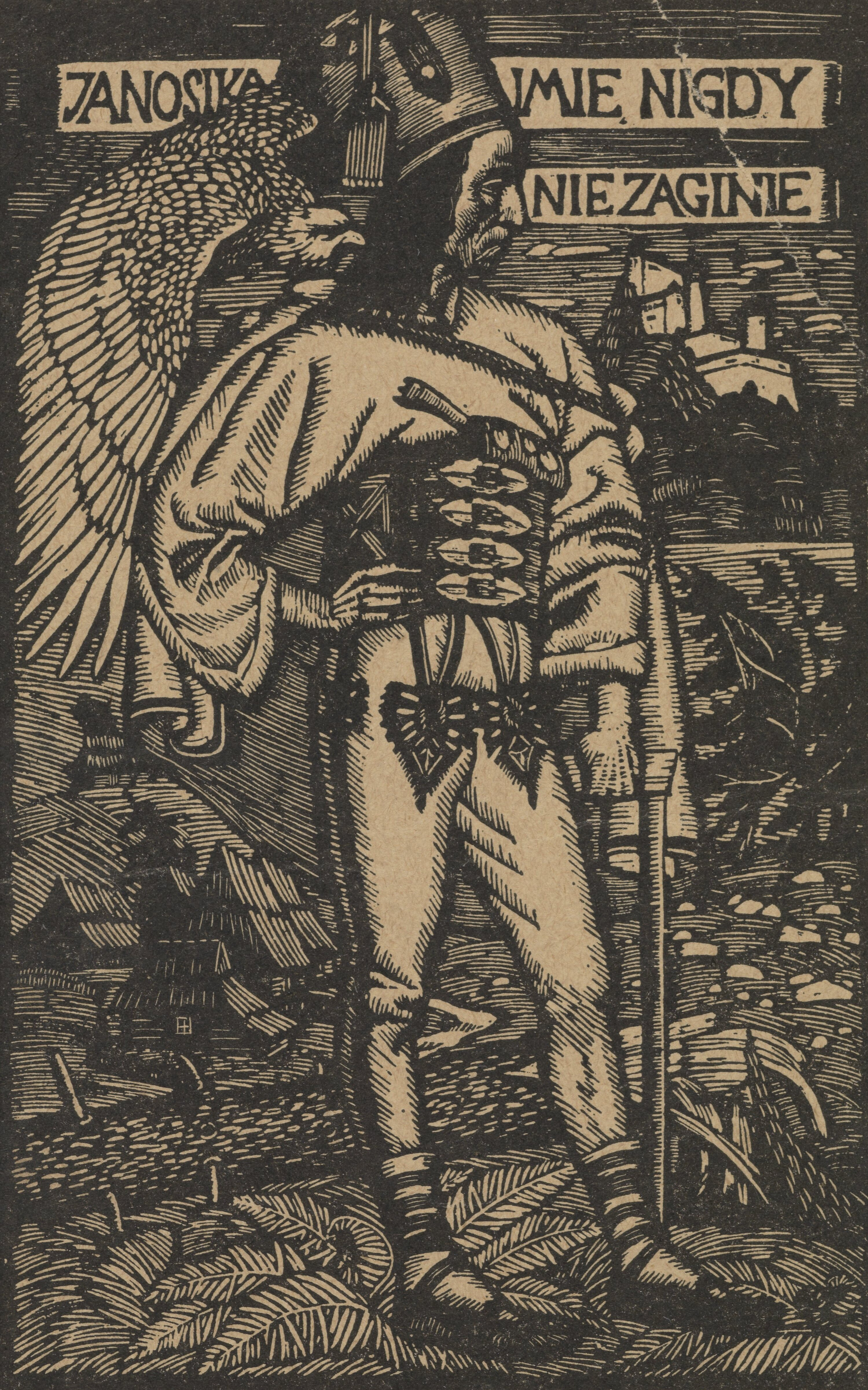
- Wood engraving by Władysław Skoczylas, which reads (in Polish), "The name of Janosik will never perish".
- Born: January 1688; Terchová (Tyerhova), Kingdom of Hungary (present-day Slovakia)
- Died: 17 March 1713 (aged 25); Liptovský Mikuláš (Liptószentmiklós), Kingdom of Hungary (present-day Slovakia)
- Cause of death: Execution
- Other names: Juro Jánošík, Jurko Jánošík, Jerzy Janosik, Jánosik György
- Occupations: soldier, prison guard, highwayman
- Known for: Slovak folk hero

Juraj Jánošík (first name also Juro or Jurko, Slovak pronunciation: [ˈjuraj ˈjaːnɔʃiːk]; Hungarian: Jánosik György, baptised 25 January 1688, died 17 March 1713) was a Slovak highwayman. Jánošík has been the main character of many Slovak novels, poems, and films. According to the legend, he robbed nobles and gave the loot to the poor, a deed often attributed to the famous Robin Hood. The legend is known in neighboring Poland (under the name Jerzy Janoszik also Janosik, Janiczek or Janicek) and the Czech Republic as well as Slovakia. The actual robber had little to do with the modern legend, whose content partly reflects the ubiquitous folk myths of a hero taking from the rich and giving to the poor. However, the legend was also shaped in important ways by the activists and writers in the 19th century when Jánošík became the key highwayman character in stories that spread in the north counties of the Kingdom of Hungary (much in present-day Slovakia) and among the local Gorals inhabitants of the Podhale region north of the Tatra Mountains.

The image of Jánošík as a symbol of resistance to oppression was reinforced when poems about him became part of the Slovak and Czech middle and high school literature curriculum, and then again with the numerous films that propagated his modern legend in the 20th century. During the anti-Nazi Slovak National Uprising, one of the partisan groups bore his name. A 7.5m metal statue of Jánošík, sculpted by Ján Kulich in 1988, stands on a hill overlooking the Vrátna Valley near his home town of Terchová.

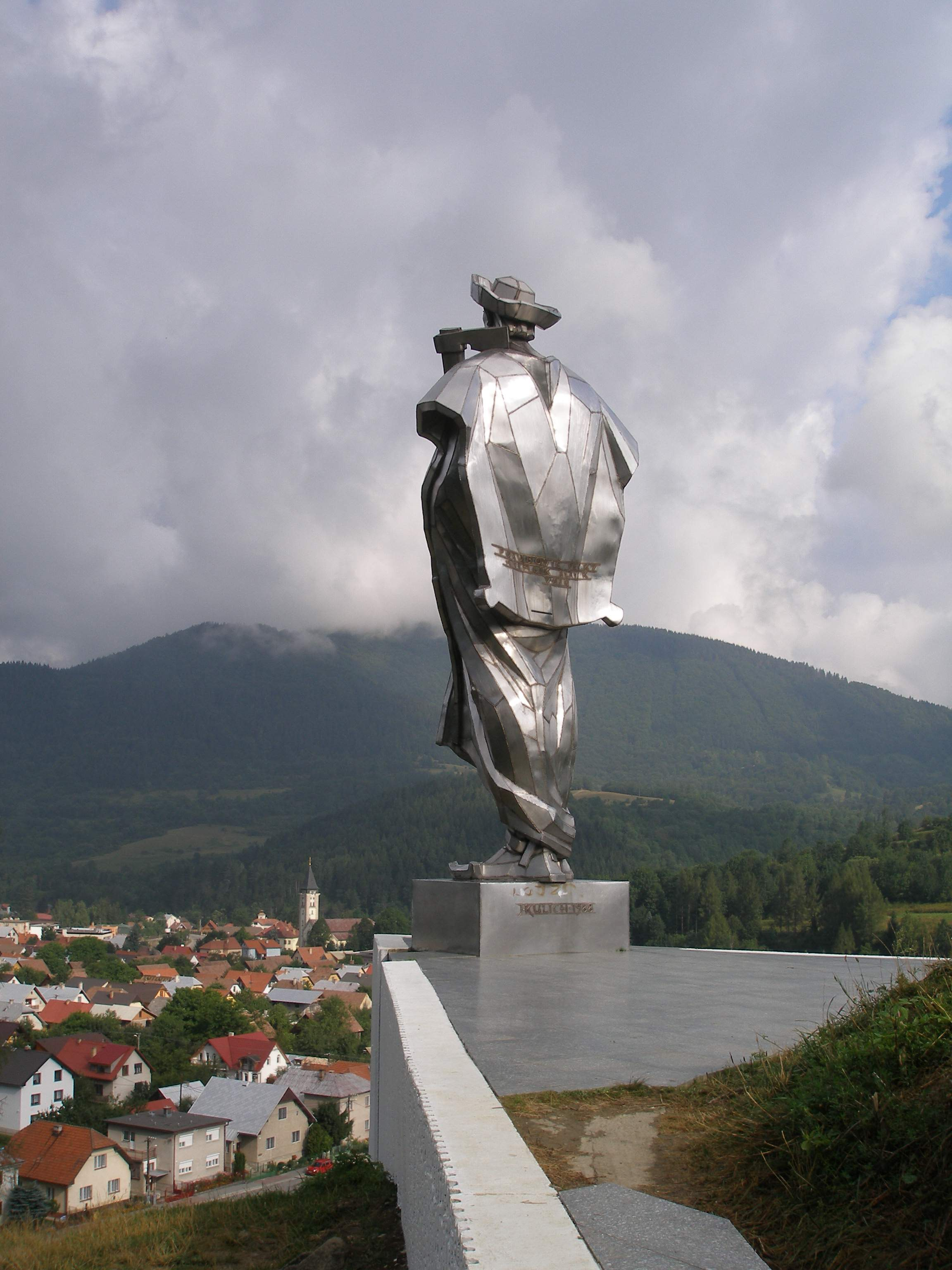
Statue of Jánošík at Terchová

== Biography ==
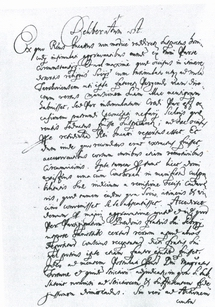
The page No. 39 of the protocol from the trial with Juraj Jánošík. It is archived under the title Fassio Janosikiana, anno 1713 die 16 mensis Martii. Jánošík is called here "agili Georgius Janošík Tyarchoviensis latronum et praedorum antesignatus" - cautious (or agile) Juro Jánošík from the Terchová, the chief of the thieves and outlaws.

Jánošík was born on 25 January 1688, and baptised shortly after. His parents were Martin Jánošík and Anna Čišníková from Terchová (Tyerhova) in the Habsburg monarchy's Kingdom of Hungary area (present-day Žilina District in northwestern Slovakia). His godparents were Jakub Merjad and Barbara Krištofíková.

He grew up in the village of Terchová. He fought alongside the Kuruc insurgents when he was fifteen. After the lost Battle of Trenčín (Trencsén), Jánošík was recruited by the Habsburg army. In autumn 1710, as a young prison guard in Bytča (Nagybiccse), he helped the imprisoned Tomáš Uhorčík escape. They formed a highwayman group and Jánošík became its leader at the age of 23, after Uhorčík left to settle in Klenovec (Klenóc). The group was active mostly in northwestern Kingdom of Hungary (today's Slovakia), around the Váh river between Važec (Vázsec) and Východná (Vichodna), but the territory of their activity extended also to other parts of today's Slovakia, as well as to Poland and Moravia. Most of their victims were rich merchants. Under Jánošík's leadership, the group was exceptionally chivalrous: they did not kill any of the robbed victims and even helped an accidentally injured priest. They are also said to have shared their loot with the poor and this part of the legend may be based on the facts too.

Jánošík was captured in autumn 1712 and detained at the Mansion of Hrachovo (Rimaráhó), but was released soon afterwards. He was captured again in spring of 1713, in the Uhorčík's residence in Klenovec. Uhorčík lived there under the false name Martin Mravec at that time. According to a widespread legend, he was caught in a pub run by Tomáš Uhorčík, after slipping on spilled peas, thrown in his way by a treacherous old lady. Jánošík was imprisoned and tried in Liptovský Svätý Mikuláš (Liptószentmiklós).

His trial took place on 16 and 17 March 1713, when he was sentenced to death. The date of his execution was not recorded, but it was customary to carry it out as soon as the trial was over. The manner of his execution, not in public awareness until the early 19th century, became part of his modern legend. A hook was pierced through his left side and he was left dangling on the gallows to die. The brutal way of execution was reserved for leaders of robber bands. However, sources diverge about how he was executed, and it is also possible that Jánošík was hanged. A legend says that he refused the coup de grâce offered in exchange for naming his associates with the words: "If you have baked me so you should also eat me!" and jumped on the hook.

== Other members of Jánošík's group ==
- Vrabel and Hunčiak (also known as Huncaga) (so-called Turiak) from Staškov
- Jakub Chliastkov from Oščadnica
- Ondráš from Dlhá nad Kysucou
- Ondrej Kindis from Dlhé Pole
- Plavčík from Dunajov
- Pavol Bernatík from Nová Bystrica
- Kovalský and Bagaj from Raková
- Kovalíček, Holubek and Valíček from Moravia
- Gavora, Satora and Oresiak from Poland

== Jánošík in film ==
- 1921 Jánošík – first Slovak feature film; financed by Slovak-American Tatra Film Co.; director: Jaroslav Jerry Siakeľ, Jánošík: Theodor Pištěk. (Based on this film UNESCO registers Slovakia as the tenth national cinema in the world that began to produce feature films).
- 1935 Jánošík – Slovak and Czech film; director: Martin Frič, Jánošík: Paľo Bielik.
- 1954 Janosik – first Polish animation; director: Włodzimierz Haupe and Halina Bielińska.
- 1963 Jánošík I and II – Slovak film; director: Paľo Bielik, Jánošík: František Kuchta.
- 1974 Janosik – Polish film; director: Jerzy Passendorfer, Janosik: Marek Perepeczko.
- 1974 Janosik – Polish 13-episode TV series; director: Jerzy Passendorfer, Janosik: Marek Perepeczko.
- 1976 Highwayman Jurko / Zbojník Jurko – Slovak animated film; director: Viktor Kubal.
- 1991 Highwayman Jurošík / Zbojník Jurošík – Slovak 28-episode animated TV series; director: Jaroslav Baran.
- 2009 Janosik: A True Story / Jánošík. Pravdivá história / Janosik. Prawdziwa historia – Slovak-Polish-Czech coproduction; director: Agnieszka Holland and Katarzyna Adamik, Janosik: Václav Jiráček.

== Jánošík in literature ==
- 1785 Slovak – Anon., "An Excellent Sermon by a Certain Preacher in the Days of the Chief Highwayman Jánošík." Staré nowiny liternjho uměnj, May 1785.
- 1809 Slovak – Bohuslav Tablic, "Jánošík, the Highwayman of Liptov County." Slowensstj Werssowcy. Collecta revirescunt. Swazek druhý.
- 1814 Slovak – Pavol Jozef Šafárik, "Celebrating Slavic Lads." Tatranská Můza s ljrau Slowanskau.
- 1829 Slovak lower nobleman in German – Johann Csaplovics, "Robbers." Gemälde von Ungern.
- 1845 Slovak lower nobleman – Štefan Marko Daxner, "Jánošík's Treasure." Orol Tatránski.
- 1846 Slovak – Ján Botto, "Jánošík's Song." Holubica, Zábavník Levočskích Slovákou.
- 1846 Slovak – Samo Chalupka, "Jánošík's Contemplation." Orol Tatránski.
- 1862 Ján Botto, "The Death of Jánošík. A Romance." Lipa. — A key poem in Slovak literature and culture.
- 1867 Slovak lower nobleman – Jonáš Záborský, Jánošík's Dinner. A Play in Four Acts With an Historical Background. A supplement to the journal Sokol.
- 1875 Hungarian – "Jánosik and a Snitch." Nyitramegyei Szemle.
- 1884 Polish – August Wrześniowski, "A Story About Janosik." Pamięci Towarzystwa Tatrzańskiego.
- 1884 Czech – Alois Jirásek, "About Jánošík." Staré pověsti české.
- 1893 American in Slovak – Dobrý Slovák, Jánošík, the Lad of Freedom: A Legend of Times Gone By.
- 1894 American in Slovak – Gustáv Maršall-Petrovský, Jánošík, Captain of Mountain Lads – His Tumultuous Life and Horrific Death. A Novel. — A source of the screenplay for the 1921 Slovak film Jánošík.
- 1900 American – George J. Krajsa, Janosik.
- 1910 Czech – Jiří Mahen, Jánošík. — A play, a source of the screenplay for the 1921 Slovak film Jánošík.
- 1933 Slovak – Ján Hrušovský, "Jánošík." Slovenská politika. — Narrative newspaper strips published later as a novel.
- 1943 Slovak – Mária Rázusová-Martáková, Jánošík: A Rhymed Play in Five Acts.
- 1947 Polish – Stanisław Nędza-Kubiniec, Janosik: A Poem About the Highwayman who Wanted to Make the World Equal.
- 1955 Slovak – Mária Rázusová-Martáková, Tales about Jánošík.
- 1958 Polish – Jalu Kurek, Janosik...
- 1964 German – Käthe Altwallstädt, "Janosik and the Students." Die blaue Rose: Märchen aus Polen.
- 1969 Polish – Katarzyna Gaertner, music, and Ernest Bryll, lyrics, Painted on Glass. — A musical whose Bratislava production had the longest run in the history of Slovak theater.
- 1970 Slovak – Stanislav Štepka, Jááánošííík. — A spoof and the Slovak play with the longest run.
- 1972 Polish – Tadeusz Kwiatkowski, Janosik. — A graphic novel.
- 1972 Serbian in Slovak – Štefan Gráf, Jur Jánošiak. — Parallel publication in Serbia (Yugoslavia) and Slovakia (Czechoslovakia).
- 1979 Slovak – Ľubomír Feldek, Jánošík According to Vivaldi. — A spoof play.
- 1980 Slovak – Margita Figuli, A Ballad of Jur Jánošík.
- 1980 Slovak – Ladislav Ťažký, Jánošík's Tear.
- 1985 American – John H. Hausner, "Jánošík, We Remember!" And Other Poems.
- 1993 Ukrainian in Polish – Василь Іванович Сави, Яносик, польська народна казка. — A picture book.
- 1994 Slovak – Anton Marec, Jánošík, Jánošík... (33 Legends About the Famous Highwayman Commander.)
- 2018 American in English; "Odysseus Ascendant", one of the stealthy rogue class destroyers featured prominently is named the Jánošík and captained by a native Slovak.

== Jánošík in other media ==
- 2020 Janosik – a free, retro-styled, action-platformer Metroidvania video game.
- 2024 Janosik 2 – a non-free sequel to the 2020 video game.
- 2025 “Persona 5: The Phantom X” - a free mobile and PC video game, Janosik stands out as the main character’s Persona

== See also ==
- Robin Hood - an English semi-legendary character
- Harnaś - a Slavic title given to a commander of mountains footpad units.
