= Kysuce Museum =

Museum in Slovakia

- Kysucké múzeum
- Former name: Okresné vlastivedné múzeum
- Established: 1 January 1972
- Location: Čadca, Slovakia
- Coordinates: 49.439904°N 18.789516°E
- Type: Regional
- Website: www.kysuckemuzeum.sk/sk/

The Kysuce Museum (Slovak: Kysucké múzeum), located in Čadca, is one of the youngest museums in Slovakia. It has five exhibitions under its management, offering a wide portfolio of cultural and historical aspects related to the Kysuce region. The museum is a specialized regional cultural facility focused on the purposeful collection, protection, scientific and professional processing and making available of material documents with a focus on museum documentation of the development of nature and society, science and technology, culture and art in the Kysuce region, from the first traces of settlement to the present day. The founder of the museum is the Žilina Self-Governing Region. The author of the Kysuce Museum logo is Miroslav Cipár, a prominent Slovak painter, graphic artist, illustrator, and graphic designer originally from the Kysuce village of Vysoká nad Kysucou. The museum has a rich publishing activity.

== History ==
The Kysuce Museum was founded in 1972 with the aim of preserving the cultural heritage of the region, which it then conveys to its visitors. It was originally founded as a district homeland history museum.

== Branches ==
The museum has five branches:

1. The Čadca Museum (Múzeum Čadca) with a permanent exhibition dedicated to the history of Čadca and the surrounding area, including regular thematic exhibitions. The museum management is also based in Čadca.
2. The Radoľa Manor House (Kaštieľ Radoľa) is one of the oldest historical buildings in Kysuce and represents a Renaissance type of manor house.
3. The Museum of Homeland History in Krásno nad Kysucou (Vlastivedné múzeum v Krásne nad Kysucou) presents the fauna and flora of northwestern Slovakia. Its great attraction is a life-size replica of a female mammoth, which has no analogues in Slovak museums.
4. The Museum of the Kysuce Village (Múzeum kysuckej dediny) in Nová Bystrica, a local part of Vychylovka, where the Historical Logging Switchback Railway (Historická lesná úvraťová železnica) and the St. Hubert Arboretum (Arborétum sv. Huberta) are also located. A permanent ethnographic exhibition in nature is installed in Vychylovka. The St. Hubert Arboretum, founded in 2026, is the youngest part of the museum in Vychylovka. Historically, it followed the planting of the memorable solitary Tree of Peace, which was planted in the area of the open air museum in 2018. The Arboretum was opened by Mons. Nicola Girasoli, Apostolic Nuncio to Slovakia.

The Kysuce Museum also includes the professional workplace, the Forest Railways Documentation Center (Dokumentačné centrum lesných železníc), which is entrusted with the comprehensive documentation of the development of narrow-gauge forest railways on a nationwide scale.

== Madonna of Kysuce ==
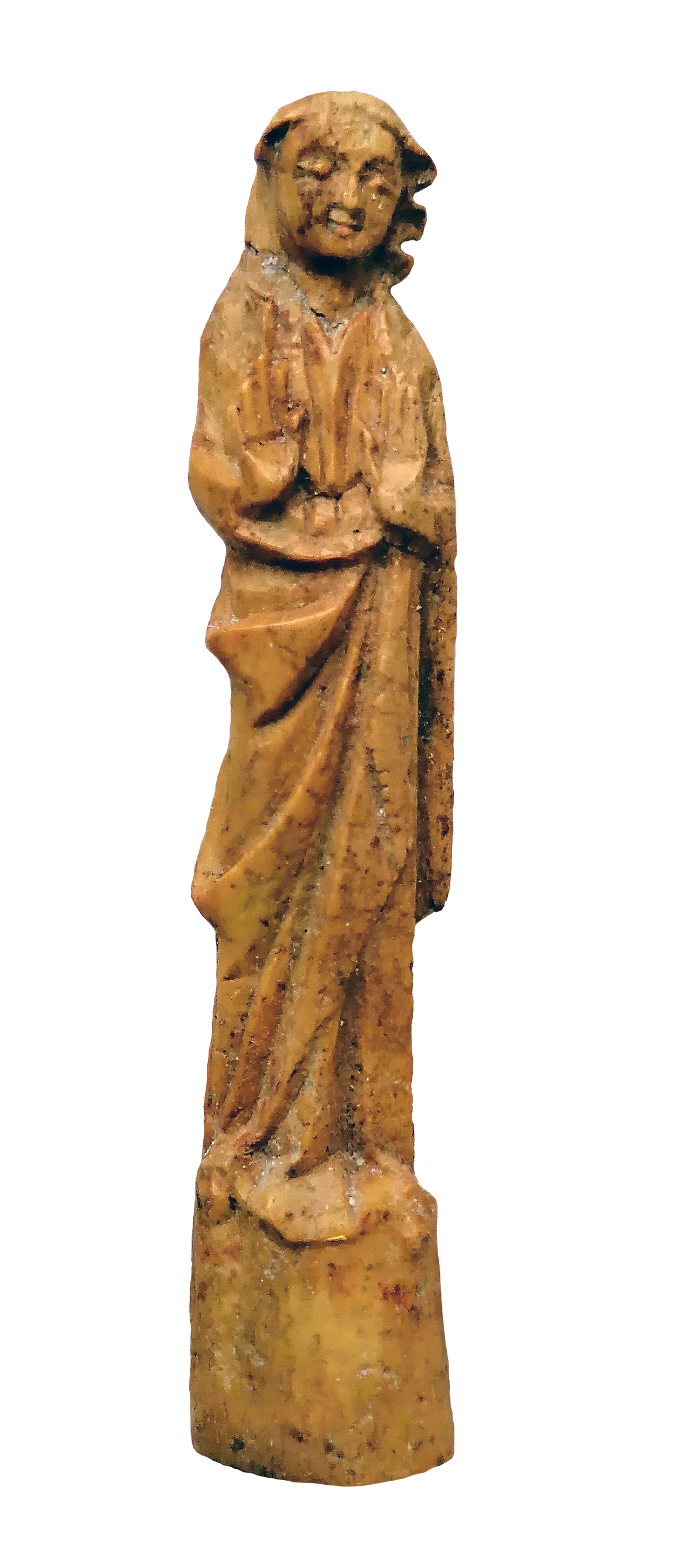
Madonna of Kysuce

A Gothic bone sculpture, the so-called Kysucká Madona (Madonna of Kysuce), is the museum's most rare precious collection items. The 84-millimeter object depicts a female figure in a long dress. According to experts, it is a French or German work from the 13th or 14th century.
