= Radoľa Manor House =

Historic building in Kysuce, Slovakia

Coordinates: 49°17′38.83″N 18°47′11.84″E

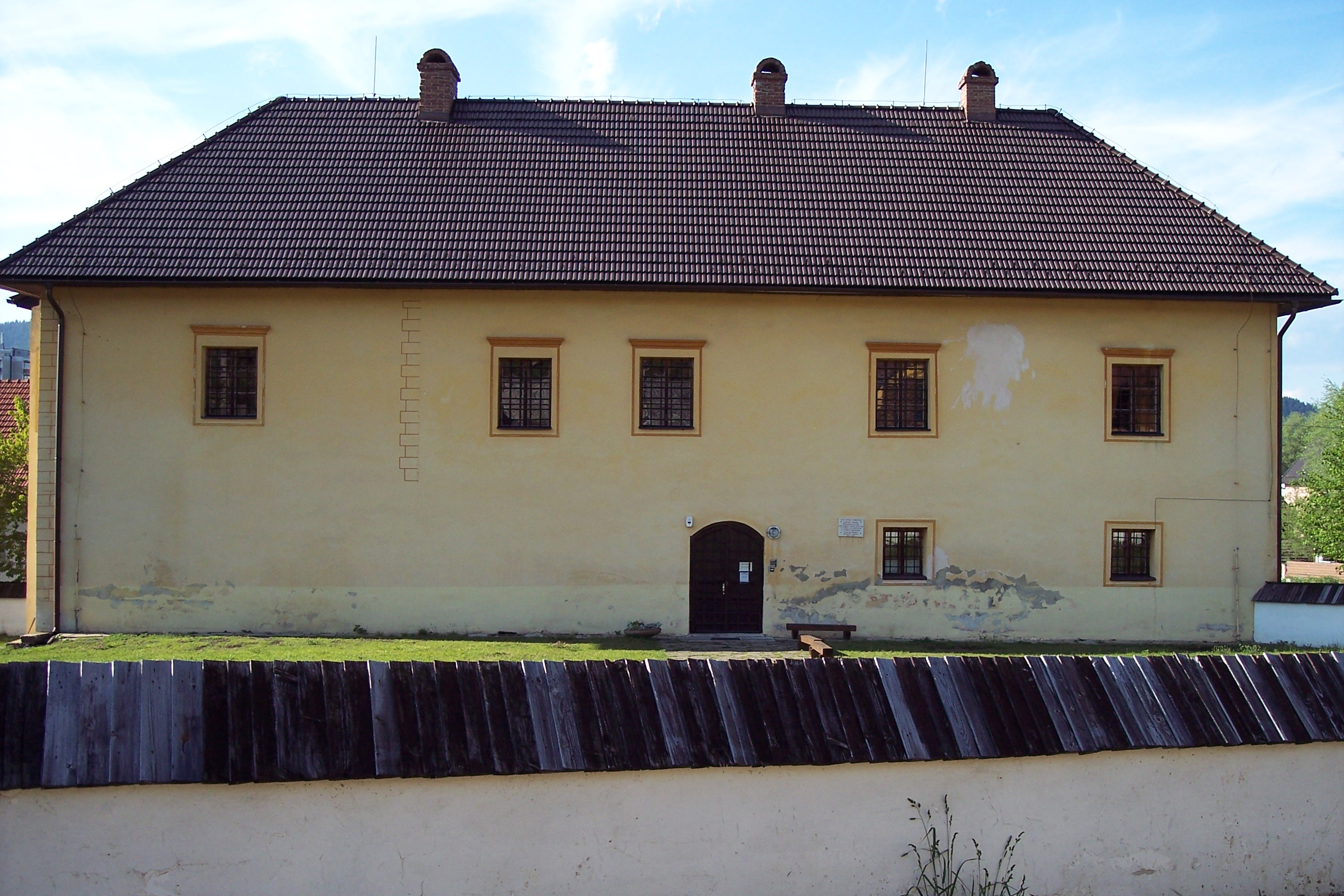
Picture of Manor-house in Radola

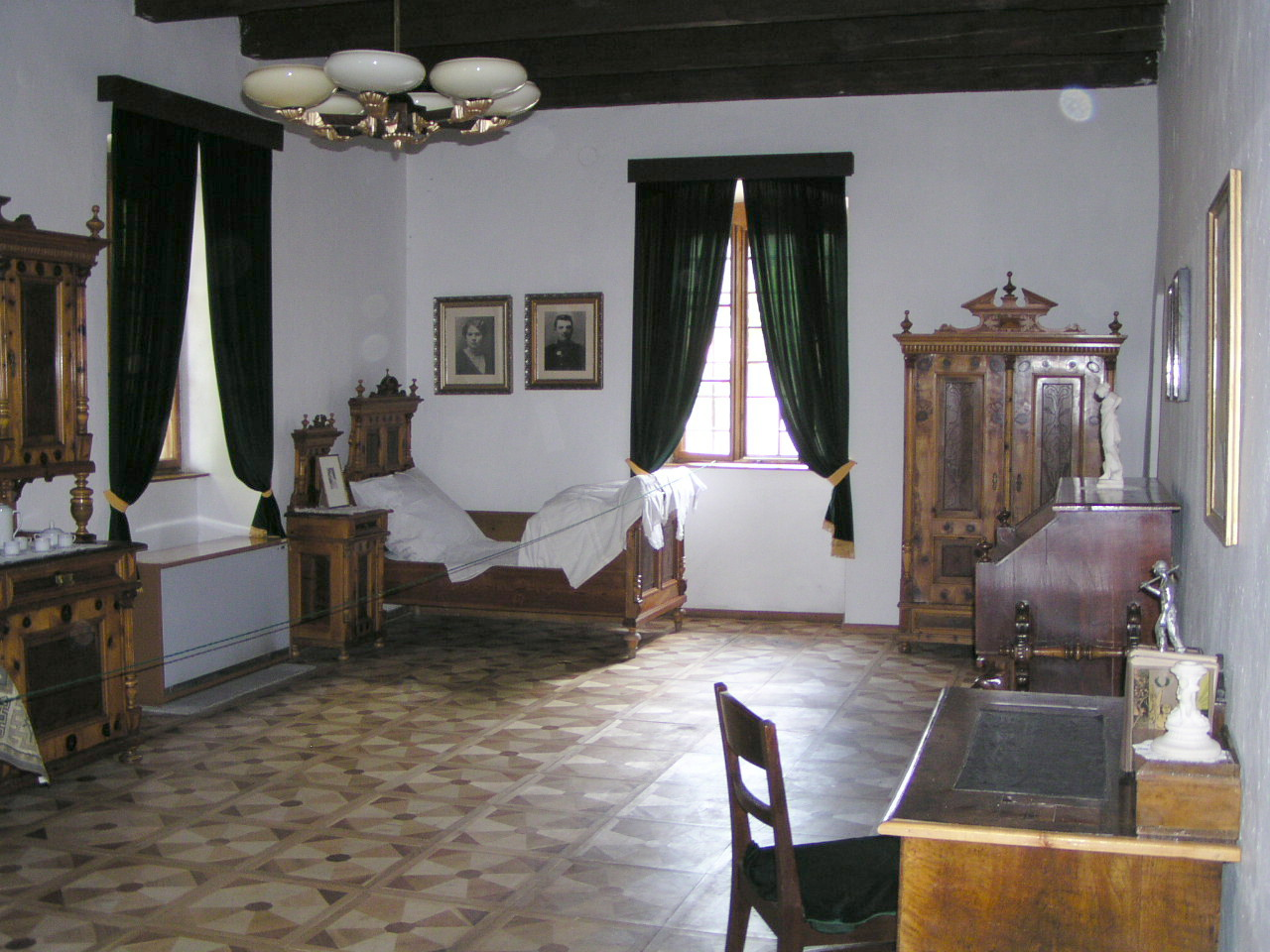
Interior of Manor-house in Radola

The Radoľa Manor House (Kaštieľ Radoľa) is one of the oldest historical monuments in Kysuce, Slovakia. Historical research suggests that the oldest part of the building dates to between 1550 and 1575. In the second half of the 17th century, the building was reconstructed, probably as part of the major development of Kysuce; the manor house was now at the center of the town. At that time the manor house was a part of the budatin lordship owned by Szunyogh family whose descendants owned it until 1798, when the budatin lordship passed into the ownership of the Csaky family. The well preserved manor house in Radola represents a Renaissance type of yeoman's habitation and initially it was apparently fortified by a castle wall. The object is managed by the regional Kysuce Museum.

== See also ==
- Radola
