= Ladislav Bartolomeides =

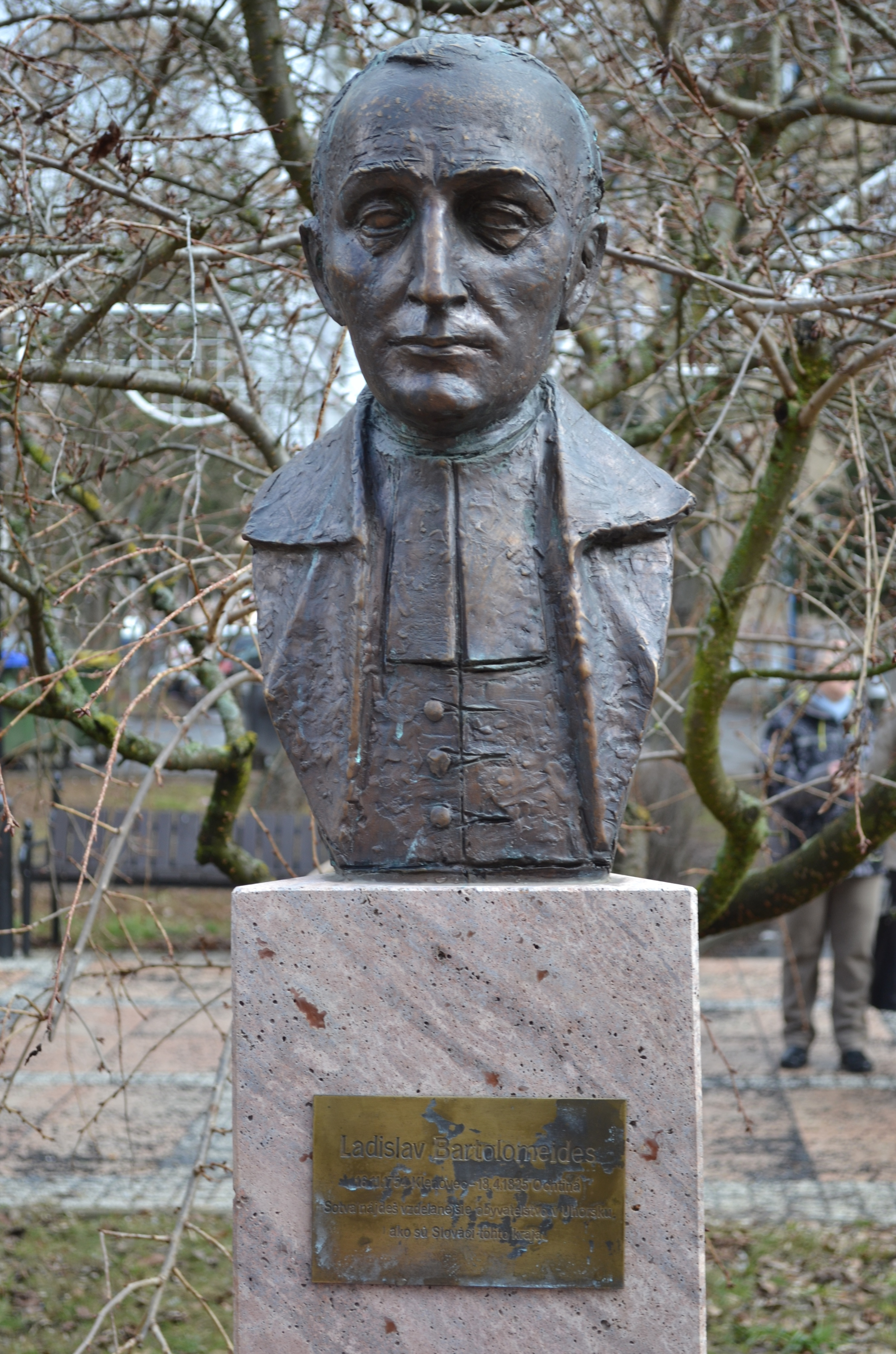
Bust of Bartolomeides

Ladislav Bohuslav Bartolomeides or László Bartholomaeides (16 November 1754, Klenovec – 18 April 1825, Ochtiná) was a Slovak preacher, geographer, translator, teacher, and writer. A major work was on the caves of Gemer and he also translated from other languages to write textbooks in Slovak on a range of subjects, notably on world geography.

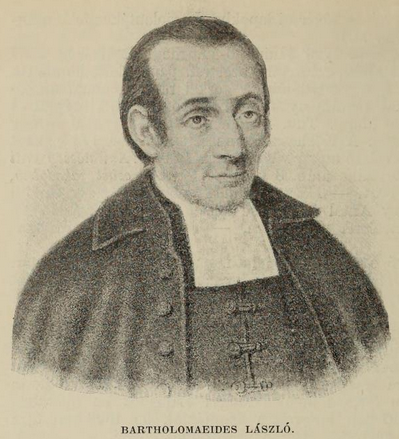
Portrait

Bartolomeides was born in Klenovec, the eldest child of protestant pastor Daniel Bartholomeides (1728–1793) who originally belonged to the Eordeg (Hungarian Ördög) nobility but since the word meant "devil" in Slovak and inappropriate for a priest, he changed the name to Bartolomeides (Latin spelling Bartholomaeides). He went to Dobšiná to study German from 1768 and in 1772 he went to the Kežmarok Lyceum. In 1775 he followed his teacher Jozef Benczúr to Bratislava but after failing to support himself with a scholarship he went home to Kraskov where he worked as a teacher. He also taught at Ožďany and in 1781 he went to the University of Wittenberg but returned in 1783 without completing studies due to lack of funds. He taught at Ratkova and then accepted a position in the church in Ochtiná as a teacher and later as a pastor. He held this position until his death.

Bartolomeides translated and produced several Slovak textbooks. On religion in 1798 and then on geography and natural history. He wrote a monograph on Gömör County from 1806 to 1808 which had several sections dealing with physical, topographical, political, ecclesiastical, literary, economic and diplomatic matters. He took a special interest in the caves of Gemer, producing a map of them.

His son Ján Bartholomeides (1787–1862) became a pastor in Hungary and published a memoir of his father's works three years after the death of Ladislav in 1825. A bust was installed in 2012 in Rimavská Sobota.
