= Vyšný Skálnik =

Vyšný Skálnik Felsősziklás
- Municipality
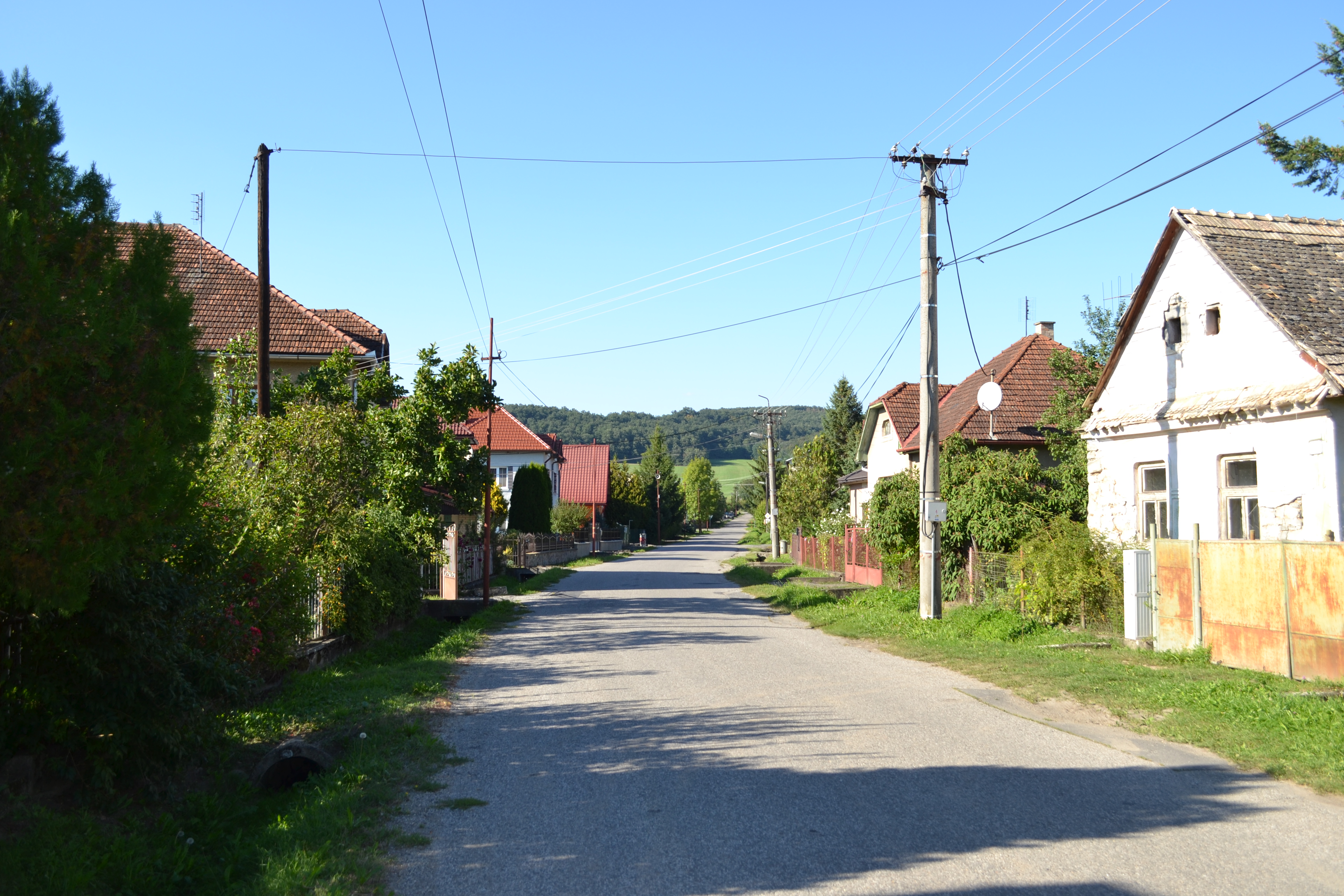

- Flag

- Location of Vyšný Skálnik in the Banská Bystrica Region Location of Vyšný Skálnik in Slovakia
- Coordinates: 48.47°N 19.97°E
- Country: Slovakia
- Region: Banská Bystrica Region
- District: Rimavská Sobota District
- First mentioned: 1334

Area
  - Total: 5.05 km^{2} (1.95 sq mi)
- Elevation: 236 m (774 ft)

Population (2025)
  - Total: 143
- Time zone: UTC+1 (CET)
  - Summer (DST): UTC+2 (CEST)
- Postal code: 980 52
- Area code: +421 47
- Vehicle registration plate (until 2022): RS

Vyšný Skálnik (Hungarian: Felsősziklás) is a village and municipality in the Rimavská Sobota District of the Banská Bystrica Region of southern Slovakia. Now more or less a tourist village with a water reservoir, it was constructed in the 1970s and is now a place for fishing, and in winter a skating rink. In the village neighbourhood are chalets and cottages, where their owners from Bratislava, but also other Slovak cities take their rest. It is the birthplace of a poet of Štúr generation, Ján Botto. The village hosts its museum, statue and a plaque on the house where he was born.

== Geography ==
The municipality lies at an altitude of 236 metres (774 ft) and covers an area of 5.05 km^{2} (1.95 sq mi) (2025).

== Population ==
Population statistic (10 years)
Year	1995	2005	2015	2025
Count	151	151	152	143
Difference		+0%	+0.66%	−5.92%

Population statistic
Year	2024	2025
Count	145	143
Difference		−1.37%

It has a population of 143 people (31 December 2025).

=== Ethnicity ===
Census 2021 (1+ %)
Ethnicity	Number	Fraction
Slovak	135	99.26%
Not found out	2	1.47%
Total	136	

In year 2021 was 136 people by ethnicity 135 as Slovak, 2 as Not found out, 1 as Czech, 1 as Rusyn and 1 as Hungarian.

Note on population: The difference values of population numbers in the table "Population statistic" and in the sections "Ethnicity" & "Religion" is caused by the use of various statistical methods.

=== Religion ===
Census 2021 (1+ %)
Religion	Number	Fraction
Roman Catholic Church	75	55.15%
None	35	25.74%
Evangelical Church	21	15.44%
Other	2	1.47%
Total	136	

In year 2021 was 136 people by religion 75 from Roman Catholic Church, 35 from None, 21 from Evangelical Church, 2 from Other, 1 from Eastern Orthodox Church, 1 from Jehovah's Witnesses and 1 from Ad hoc movements.
