= Radoľa =

- Municipality
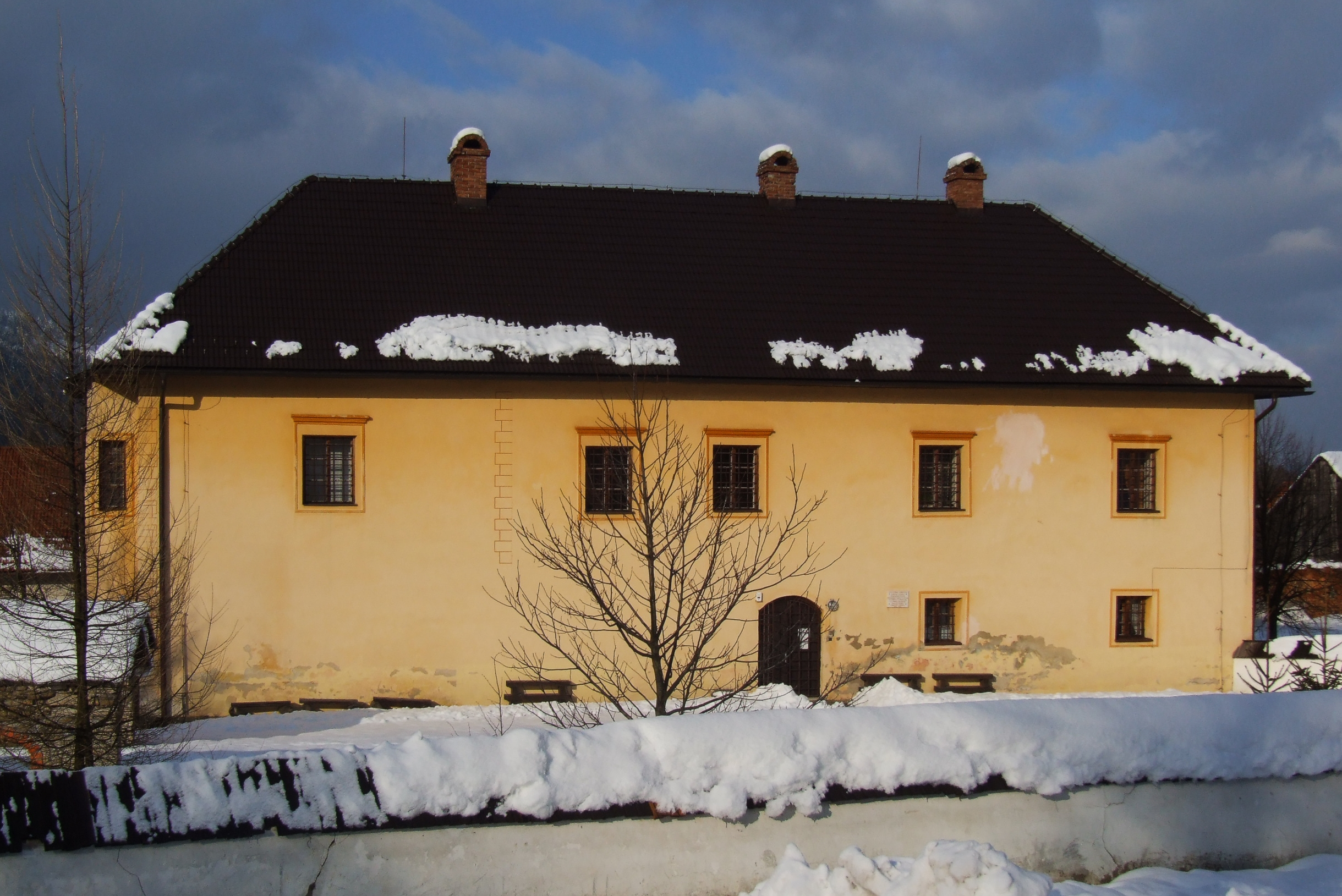
- Radoľa Manor House

- Flag

- Location of Radoľa in the Žilina Region Location of Radoľa in Slovakia
- Coordinates: 49.29°N 18.79°E
- Country: Slovakia
- Region: Žilina Region
- District: Kysucké Nové Mesto District
- First mentioned: 1332

Government
  - Mayor: Anton Tkáčik (Ind.)

Area
  - Total: 6.72 km^{2} (2.59 sq mi)
- Elevation: 368 m (1,207 ft)

Population (2025)
  - Total: 1,537
- Time zone: UTC+1 (CET)
  - Summer (DST): UTC+2 (CEST)
- Postal code: 233 6
- Area code: +421 41
- Vehicle registration plate (until 2022): KM
- Website: www.radola.sk

Radoľa (Hungarian: Radola) is a village and municipality in Kysucké Nové Mesto District in the Zilina Region of northern Slovakia.

== History ==
In historical records the village was first mentioned in 1332.

== Radoľa Manor House ==
The village contains the Radoľa Manor House, one of the oldest monuments in Kysuce, Slovakia.

== Geography ==
The municipality lies at an altitude of 368 metres (1,207 ft) and covers an area of 6.72 km^{2} (2.59 sq mi) (2025).

== Population ==
Population statistic (10 years)
Year	1995	2005	2015	2025
Count	1365	1369	1474	1537
Difference		+0.29%	+7.66%	+4.27%

Population statistic
Year	2024	2025
Count	1533	1537
Difference		+0.26%

It has a population of 1537 people (31 December 2025).

=== Ethnicity ===
Census 2021 (1+ %)
Ethnicity	Number	Fraction
Slovak	1483	97.5%
Not found out	34	2.23%
Total	1521	

In year 2021 was 1521 people by ethnicity 1483 as Slovak, 34 as Not found out, 9 as Czech, 2 as Russian, 1 as Romani, 1 as Austrian, 1 as Polish, 1 as Hungarian and 1 as Other.

Note on population: The difference values of population numbers in the table "Population statistic" and in the sections "Ethnicity" & "Religion" is caused by the use of various statistical methods.

=== Religion ===
Census 2021 (1+ %)
Religion	Number	Fraction
Roman Catholic Church	1297	85.27%
None	143	9.4%
Not found out	33	2.17%
Total	1521	

In year 2021 was 1521 people by religion 1297 from Roman Catholic Church, 143 from None, 33 from Not found out, 13 from Evangelical Church, 6 from Seventh-day Adventist Church, 6 from Ad hoc movements, 4 from Other, 4 from Greek Catholic Church, 3 from Calvinist Church, 3 from Christian Congregations in Slovakia, 2 from Other and not ascertained christian church, 2 from Jehovah's Witnesses, 2 from Buddhism, 1 from Old Catholic Church, 1 from Eastern Orthodox Church and 1 from Paganism and natural spirituality.
