= Jánošík (1921 film) =

1921 film

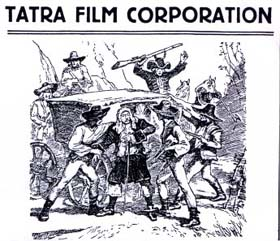
- Directed by: Jaroslav Jerry Siakeľ
- Written by: Novel: Gustáv Maršall-Petrovský; Play: Jiří Mahen; Screenplay: Jozef Žák-Marušiak; Jaroslav Jerry Siakeľ; Daniel Siakeľ
- Produced by: Ján Závodný
- Starring: Theodor Pištěk; Mária Fábryová; Vladimír Šrámek; Jozef Chylo
- Cinematography: Daniel Siakeľ; Oldřich Beneš
- Distributed by: Biografia
- Release dates: 25 November 1921 (Czechoslovakia); 1 December 1921 (U.S.)
- Running time: 68 min
- Countries: United States; Czechoslovakia
- Language: silent
- Budget: $14,500
- Box office: 19 mil. crowns (Czechoslovakia)

Jánošík is a Slovak black-and-white silent film from 1921. It relates the popular legend of the highwayman Juraj Jánošík. It shows the filmmakers' experience with early American movies in camera work, in the use of parallel narratives, and in sequences inspired by Westerns. Jánošík placed Slovak filmmaking as the 10th national cinema in the world to produce a full-length feature movie.

== Synopsis ==
Jánošík (1921)

The story is set in the early 18th century when many farmers in the Habsburg monarchy were obligated to work in a nobleman's fields for two days a week. The location is the Kingdom of Hungary's north-western Carpathians with a Slovak majority population. Juraj Jánošík (Theodor Pištěk), a young, imposing seminary student, returns to his home village to find that his ailing mother has just died. Count Šándor (Vladimír Šrámek), however, would not release Jánošík's father (Karel Schleichert) from his weekly obligations for her funeral and has the father caned, which proves fatal for the old man. Jánošík assaults the Count and escapes from the village.

While on the run, Jánošík finds himself fighting on the side of a band of highwaymen in a skirmish with the Count's cohort commanded by Pišta (Jozef Chylo), discards the frock, joins the band, and takes over the band's leadership. Jánošík's band parties in the mountains, robs traveling noblemen, and uses disguise to rob the guests at the noblemen's County Ball only to redistribute the booty among the farmers.

Jánošík rekindles a love affair with his childhood sweetheart Anička (Mária Fábryová), who is sexually harassed by the Count. The local priest (František Horlivý) helps Jánošík with the cover-up during his visits to the village. However, his frequent calls and yet another scuffle with the Count prove to be his undoing. With the help of a betrayer, the Count's men learn about Jánošík's whereabouts and overpower him and his band during a drinking party in a tavern. Jánošík is hanged.

The central narrative is framed in a story set around the time of the film's release, in which a hiker (Theodor Pištěk) and friends (Mária Fábryová, Jozef Chylo) pause at a mountain sheepfold where the head shepherd comments on the hiker's stature similar to the legendary Jánošík's and narrates for them the film's storyline.

== Director ==
The film was directed by Slovak-American Jaroslav Siakeľ (1896–1997). Born in Blatnica, Turiec County in central Slovakia and baptized Ludvik Jaroslav Siakeľ, he immigrated to the United States in 1912 at the age of 16 and used Ludwig Jerry as his given names in English. He used the names Jaroslav and Jerry in personal contacts.

== Company ==
The film Jánošík was made and financed by the Tatra Film Corporation founded by Slovak-Americans in Chicago at 1543 W. Chicago Ave., and incorporated in Illinois with a capital stock of $50,000 (as printed on its shares; sources mention lower amounts). The company's chief founder was its Secretary Samuel Fábry, a Chicago businessman. Its Board of Directors also included President Samuel Tvarožek, Vice-President Richard Blaha, and Business Manager Ján Šimo. Among the founders of Tatra Film were the brothers and future filmmakers Jaroslav Siakeľ and Daniel Siakeľ (1886–1964; immigrated in 1905) from Blatnica, Turiec County in central Slovakia. Both had experience with film equipment and processing, and limited experience with filmmaking from working for the Selig Polyscope Company in Chicago (some sources misidentify them as its owners or founders).

The producer of Jánošík was Ján Závodný (1890–1980) from Brezová pod Bradlom in western Slovakia, a co-founder of Tatra Film, who owned the 500-seat Casimir Theater (later Jeff Theater) in Chicago. It was filmed on location in the vicinity of the Siakeľ brothers' birthplace in Slovakia, on two sets constructed at the site, and finished on the sound stage at the A-B Studio in Prague.

== Screenplay ==
Tatra Film commissioned the screenplay from the Slovak-American Jozef Žák-Marušiak (1885–1979; immigrated in 1911) from Lakšárska Nová Ves, western Slovakia, who based it on a two-volume novel by the Slovak-American journalist Gustáv Maršall-Petrovský (1862–1916). The novel was the filmmakers' original inspiration for making the movie. The screenplay had features of a shooting script. It was typed in Slovak, on a US typewriter without diacritics, with English camera directions. However, Žák-Marušiak delivered barely a third of the screenplay before the team's departure for Slovakia, some of it arrived by mail during the shoot, and the rest did not reach them before the film was finished. The filmmakers improvised and used the play Jánošík by Jiří Mahen translated to Slovak by Martin Rázus in 1920.

== Cast ==
Actor	Role
Theodor Pištěk	Juraj Jánošík and Hiker (dual role)
Mária Fábryová	Anička, Jánošík's lover and Hiker (dual role)
Vladimír Šrámek	Count Šándor
Jozef Chylo	Count's Deputy Pišta and Hiker (dual role)
František Horlivý	Priest, the protector
L. Hušek	Highwayman Ilčík
P. Kutný	Highwayman Hrajnoha
Michal Staník	Highwayman Michalčík
Karel Schleichert	Jánošík's Father
Miloslav Schmidt	Baron Révay
Olga Augustová	Baroness Révay
Bronislava Livia	The Révays' Daughter
Jan W. Speerger	Military Commander
Saša Dobrovodská	Gypsy Woman
Ferdinand Fiala	County Chief of Liptov
Rudolf Myzet	Nobleman
Karel Fiala	Chief Judge
Jaroslav Vojta	
Samuel Šťastný	
Vlado Ivaška	

Most of the leading and supporting roles were given to professional or amateur actors. Theodor Pištěk in the dual role of Jánošík and of a hiker in the framing story was one of the most popular actors of the period who starred in nine other films in the same year. Pištěk believed that he got the role thanks to Jánošík's art director and actor (priest) František Horlivý, who was an amateur actor in Chicago, but used to work in the theater troupe organized by Pištěk's father Jan in Prague. Mária Fábryová in the leading role of Jánošík's lover Anička was an amateur actress from the town of Martin in Turiec County (and related by marriage to one of the best known Slovak poets Pavol Országh Hviezdoslav). She got the part after her uncle Samuel Fábry, the chief founder and Secretary of Tatra Film, showed her photograph to the filmmakers and advanced her for the role. The extras were local, and soldiers from the 18th Infantry Brigade at Žilina.

== Release dates ==
Jánošík was shown informally to the film crew and friends in Vrútky, Turiec County, Slovakia, before its theatrical release, which is sometimes misquoted as its release date. It had premieres in Prague, in Chicago (Cicero, IL) at the now demolished 1150-seat Atlantic, and in Žilina at the Grand Bio Universum (later Dom umenia Fatra).

The film was thought lost until 1970. It was restored by Ján Rumanovský with a music soundtrack by Jozef Malovec in 1975.

The restored version of the silent Jánošík was released on DVD in the PAL format, 4:3 aspect ratio, region-free ("Region 0"), with English, French, German, Hungarian, Polish, Russian, Slovak, and Spanish intertitles by Dikrama/Slovenský filmový ústav in 2003 as part of a 2-DVD box set with the like-named movies Jánošík I and Jánošík II, both from 1963, and bonus material.

Sources sometimes mention its presumed listing by UNESCO as world cultural heritage, but Jánošík is not included on the lists of Tangible Heritage, Intangible Heritage, or World Heritage maintained by UNESCO.

== Business ==
Jánošík's estimated budget was $14,500 and its total gross in Czechoslovakia during its theatrical run is estimated at close to 19 million Czechoslovak crowns.
