= Klenovec =

Klenovec Klenóc
- Municipality
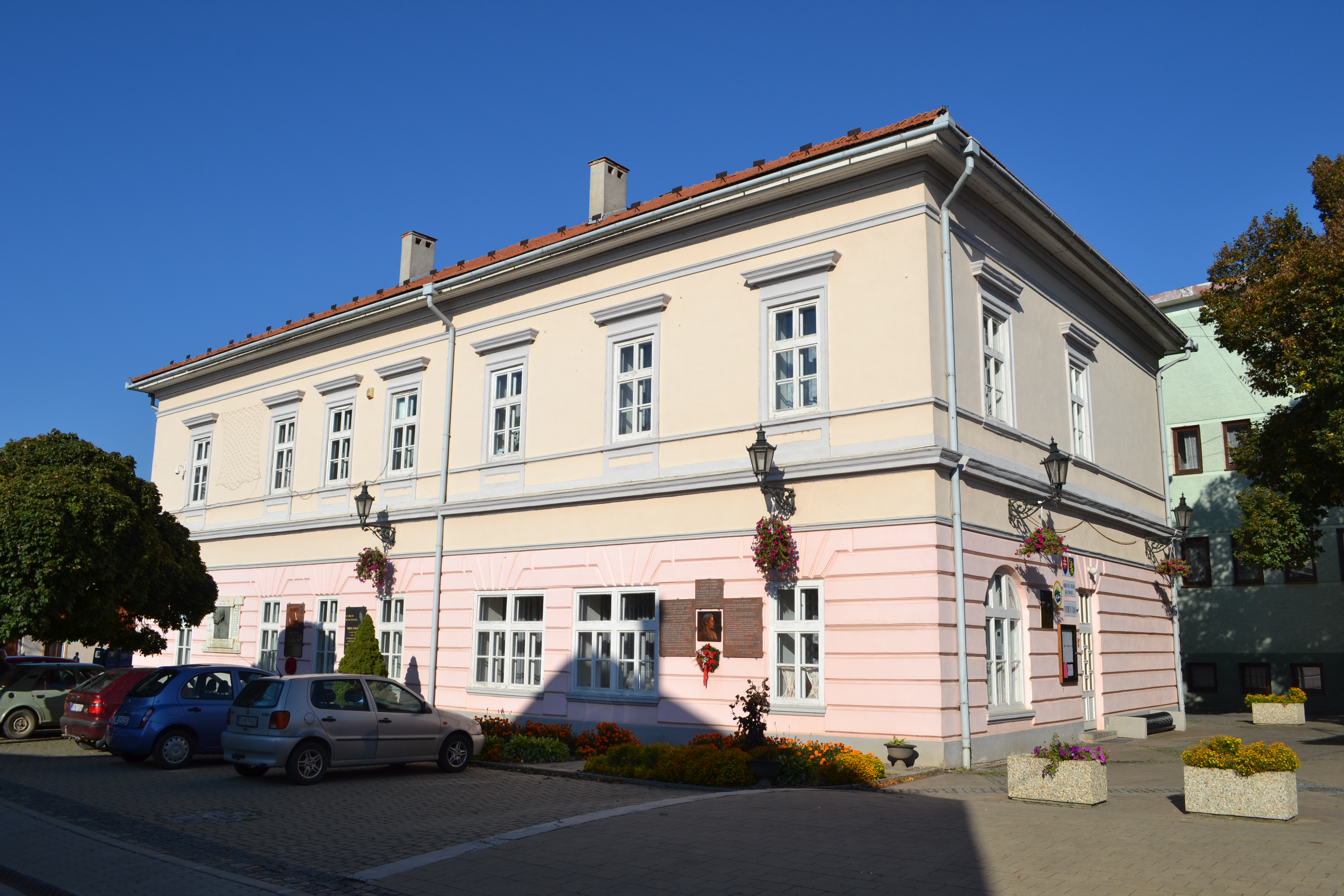

- Flag

- Location of Klenovec in the Banská Bystrica Region Location of Klenovec in Slovakia
- Coordinates: 48.60°N 19.90°E
- Country: Slovakia
- Region: Banská Bystrica Region
- District: Rimavská Sobota District
- First mentioned: 1438

Area
  - Total: 99.99 km^{2} (38.61 sq mi)
- Elevation: 335 m (1,099 ft)

Population (2025)
  - Total: 2,942
- Time zone: UTC+1 (CET)
  - Summer (DST): UTC+2 (CEST)
- Postal code: 980 55
- Area code: +421 47
- Vehicle registration plate (until 2022): RS
- Website: www.klenovec.sk

Klenovec (Hungarian: Klenóc) is a village and municipality in the Rimavská Sobota District of the Banská Bystrica Region of southern Slovakia. The village had been once a residency of Juraj Jánošík, a legendary Slovak folk hero. Near Klenovec is a big water reservoir. Most important sightseeings are classical houses from the beginning of 19th century and a classical evangelical church.

== Geography ==
The municipality lies at an altitude of 335 metres (1,099 ft) and covers an area of 99.99 km^{2} (38.61 sq mi) (2025).

== Population ==
Population statistic (10 years)
Year	1995	2005	2015	2025
Count	3344	3267	3162	2942
Difference		−2.30%	−3.21%	−6.95%

Population statistic
Year	2024	2025
Count	2952	2942
Difference		−0.33%

It has a population of 2942 people (31 December 2025).

=== Ethnicity ===
Census 2021 (1+ %)
Ethnicity	Number	Fraction
Slovak	2881	95.2%
Romani	218	7.2%
Not found out	76	2.51%
Total	3026	

In year 2021 was 3026 people by ethnicity 2881 as Slovak, 218 as Romani, 76 as Not found out, 9 as Czech, 6 as Other, 5 as German, 2 as Irish, 2 as Turkish, 2 as Rusyn, 2 as Hungarian, 1 as Ukrainian, 1 as Italian, 1 as Serbian, 1 as Russian and 1 as Moravian.

Note on population: The difference values of population numbers in the table "Population statistic" and in the sections "Ethnicity" & "Religion" is caused by the use of various statistical methods.

=== Religion ===
Census 2021 (1+ %)
Religion	Number	Fraction
Evangelical Church	1106	36.55%
Roman Catholic Church	964	31.86%
None	760	25.12%
Not found out	70	2.31%
Baptists Church	43	1.42%
Total	3026	

In year 2021 was 3026 people by religion 1106 from Evangelical Church, 964 from Roman Catholic Church, 760 from None, 70 from Not found out, 43 from Baptists Church, 26 from Greek Catholic Church, 8 from Old Catholic Church, 8 from Eastern Orthodox Church, 7 from Calvinist Church, 6 from Jehovah's Witnesses, 5 from Christian Congregations in Slovakia, 4 from United Methodist Church, 4 from Buddhism, 3 from Paganism and natural spirituality, 3 from Apostolic Church, 2 from Other and not ascertained christian church, 2 from Other, 2 from Ad hoc movements, 1 from Jewish community, 1 from Islam and 1 from Church of the Brethren.

== Notable personalities ==
- Vladimír Mináč, writer
- Ladislav Bartolomeides (1754-1825), writer, teacher and preacher

== Genealogical resources ==
The records for genealogical research are available at the state archive "Statny Archiv in Banska Bystrica, Slovakia"

- Roman Catholic church records (births/marriages/deaths): 1830-1896 (parish B)
- Greek Catholic church records (births/marriages/deaths): 1775-1928 (parish B)
- Lutheran church records (births/marriages/deaths): 1845-1895 (parish A)

== See also ==
- List of municipalities and towns in Slovakia
