= Ján Botto =

Slovak poet, writer

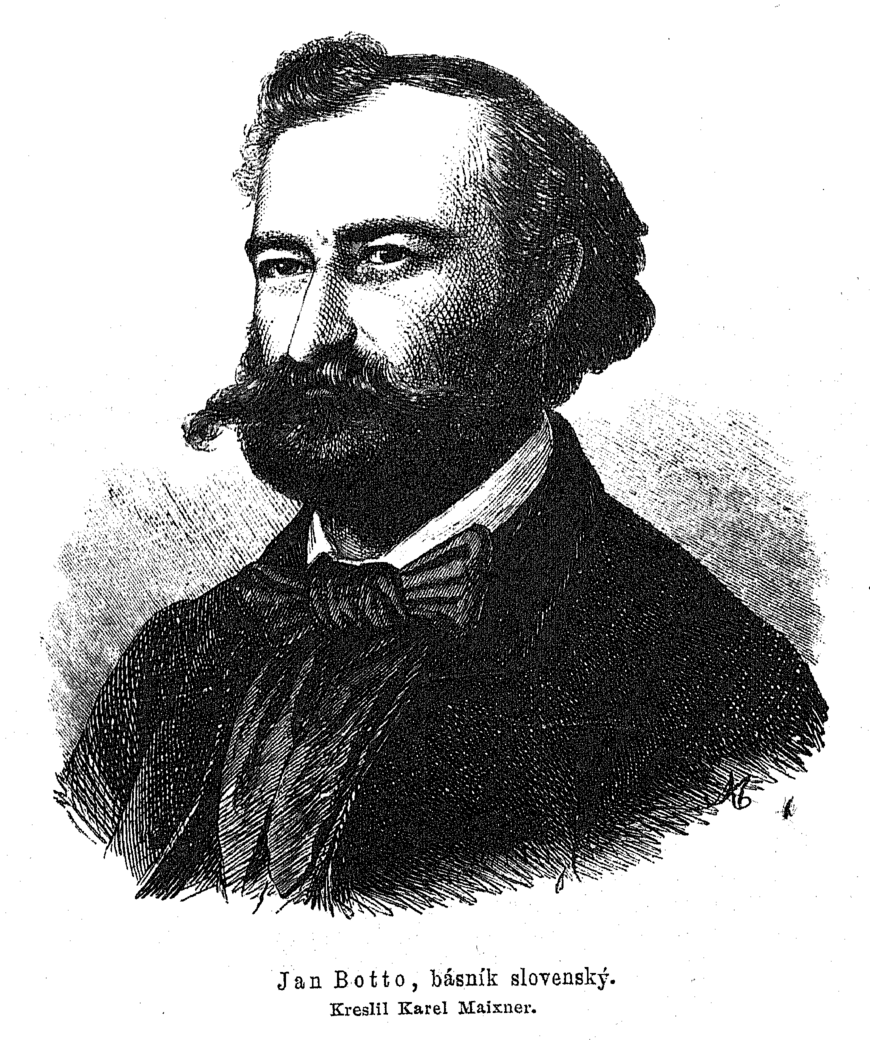

Ján Botto (27 January 1829, Vyšný Skálnik – 28 April 1881, Banská Bystrica) was a Slovak poet, writer of the Štúr generation and co-founder of the first Slovak gymnasium in Revúca.

Born into a family of farmers, he began to attend Latin Gymnasium at Ožďany and from 1843 the Evangelical lyceum at Levoča, where he wrote his first literary works. From 1853 he had been engaged as a land surveyor in different towns throughout Slovakia, Zvolen, Martin and Banská Štiavnica. In 1861 he wrote one of his most important ballads, Smrť Jánošíkova /Death of Jánošík/. He was the youngest member of writers, poets and politicians in the generation of Ľudovít Štúr. Together with Samo Chalupka, Andrej Sládkovič and Janko Kráľ he is one of the most important poets of Slovak romanticism. He died of heart failure on 28 April 1881 in Banská Bystrica.

A commemorative plaque, statue and a museum dedicated to his memory are located in Vyšný Skálnik.

Poems written by Ján Botto often took inspiration from common Slovak legends and folk tales. An example of which is the poem "Čachtická Pani" (Slovak: Lady of Čachtice) which recounts the bloody story of the Hungarian countess Elizabeth Báthory.

== Notable works ==
- Pieseň Jánošíkova (1846, Jánošík's Song)
- Piesne Slovenské (1846, Slovak Songs)
- Smrť Jánošíkova (1862, The Death of Jánošík)
- Báj Turca (1867, Myth of a Turk)
- Žltá Ľalija (1879, Yellow Lily)
- Piesne vojenské (1873, Songs of War)
- Čachtická pani (Lady of Čachtice)
