= Ožďany =

Ožďany Osgyán
- Municipality
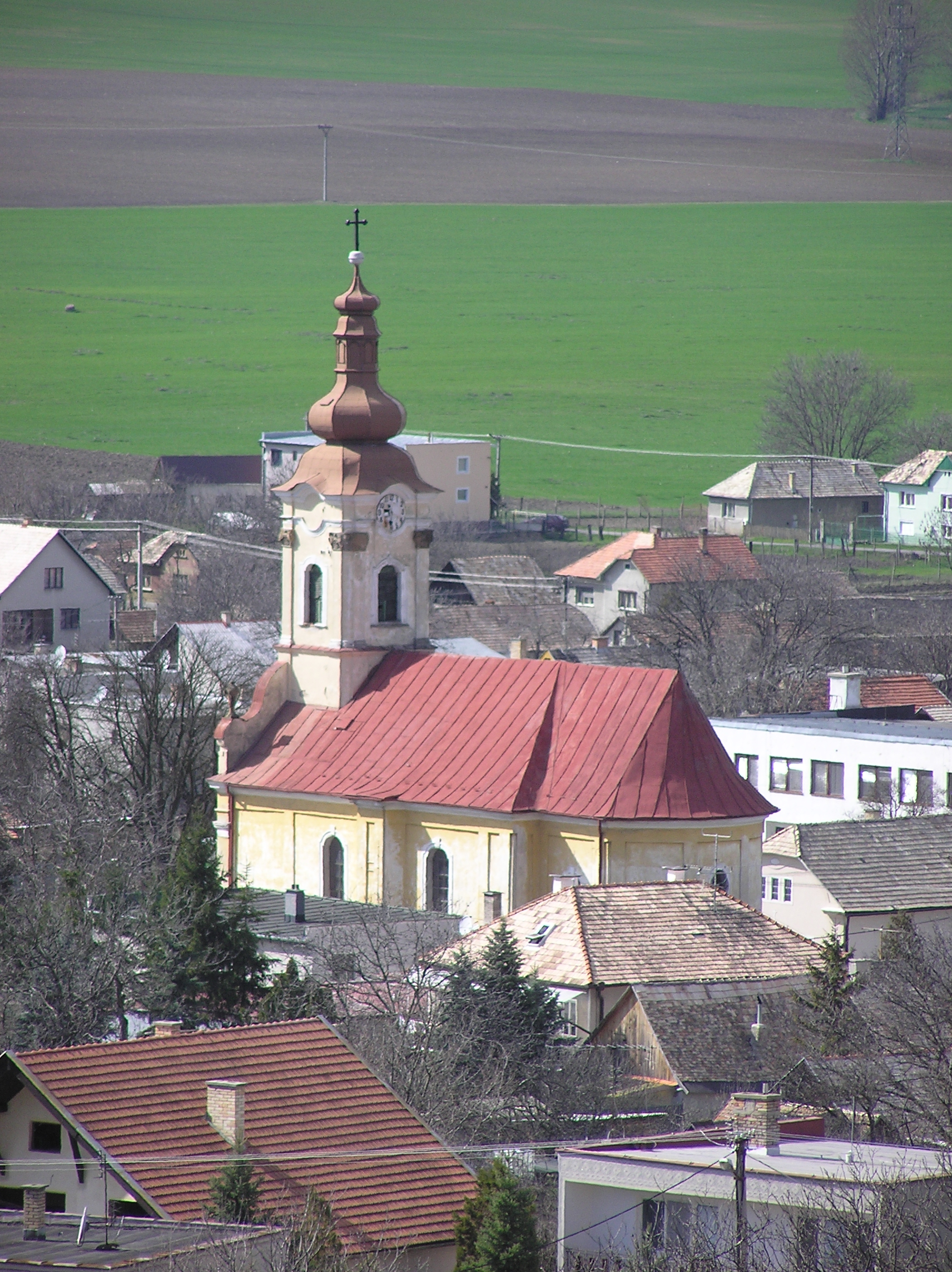

- Flag

- Location of Ožďany in the Banská Bystrica Region Location of Ožďany in Slovakia
- Coordinates: 48.39°N 19.91°E
- Country: Slovakia
- Region: Banská Bystrica Region
- District: Rimavská Sobota District
- First mentioned: 1332

Area
  - Total: 37.17 km^{2} (14.35 sq mi)
- Elevation: 213 m (699 ft)

Population (2025)
  - Total: 1,564
- Time zone: UTC+1 (CET)
  - Summer (DST): UTC+2 (CEST)
- Postal code: 980 11
- Area code: +421 47
- Vehicle registration plate (until 2022): RS
- Website: www.obecozdany.sk

Ožďany (Hungarian: Osgyán) is a village and municipality in the Rimavská Sobota District of the Banská Bystrica Region of southern Slovakia.

Local high school played an important role in the Slovak history, some important persons of Slovak literary and political life of the 19th century made their studies here, like Štefan Marko Daxner, Ján Botto and Ján Francisci-Rimavský.

Nearby cities and villages : Hrnčiarske Zalužany, Husiná and Kružno.

In the village are located gym hall, football pitch, kindergarten and elementary school. Most important sightseeings are evangelical and Roman Catholic church, manor houses and historical mill.

== Geography ==
The municipality lies at an altitude of 213 metres (699 ft) and covers an area of 37.17 km^{2} (14.35 sq mi) (2025).

== Population ==
Population statistic (10 years)
Year	1995	2005	2015	2025
Count	1508	1575	1637	1564
Difference		+4.44%	+3.93%	−4.45%

Population statistic
Year	2024	2025
Count	1583	1564
Difference		−1.20%

It has a population of 1564 people (31 December 2025).

=== Ethnicity ===
Census 2021 (1+ %)
Ethnicity	Number	Fraction
Slovak	1234	75.98%
Hungarian	338	20.81%
Not found out	101	6.21%
Total	1624	

In year 2021 was 1624 people by ethnicity 1234 as Slovak, 338 as Hungarian, 101 as Not found out, 14 as Romani, 11 as Czech, 3 as Polish, 2 as Russian, 2 as Other, 2 as English and 1 as Ukrainian.

Note on population: The difference values of population numbers in the table "Population statistic" and in the sections "Ethnicity" & "Religion" is caused by the use of various statistical methods.

=== Religion ===
Census 2021 (1+ %)
Religion	Number	Fraction
Roman Catholic Church	753	46.37%
None	473	29.13%
Evangelical Church	237	14.59%
Not found out	105	6.47%
Total	1624	

In year 2021 was 1624 people by religion 753 from Roman Catholic Church, 473 from None, 237 from Evangelical Church, 105 from Not found out, 14 from Greek Catholic Church, 12 from Calvinist Church, 12 from Jehovah's Witnesses, 4 from United Methodist Church, 3 from Other and not ascertained christian church, 3 from Ad hoc movements, 2 from Christian Congregations in Slovakia, 2 from Other, 1 from Jewish community, 1 from Eastern Orthodox Church, 1 from Paganism and natural spirituality and 1 from Baptists Church.
