= Zborov nad Bystricou =

- Municipality
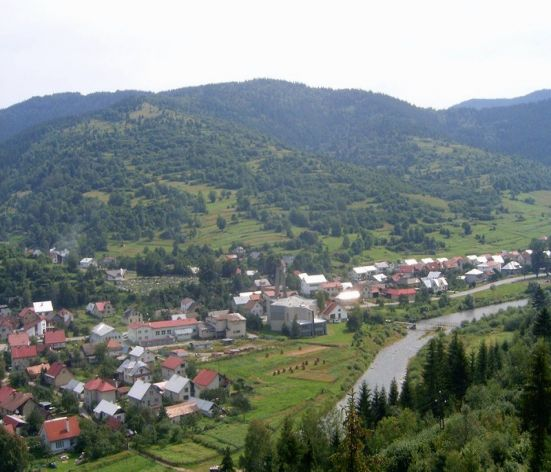

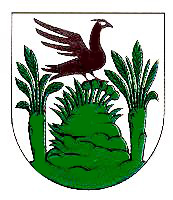
- Flag Coat of arms

- Location of Zborov nad Bystricou in the Žilina Region Location of Zborov nad Bystricou in Slovakia
- Coordinates: 49.38°N 18.88°E
- Country: Slovakia
- Region: Žilina Region
- District: Čadca District
- First mentioned: 1662

Government
  - Mayor: Jozef Čička

Area
  - Total: 18.70 km^{2} (7.22 sq mi)
- Elevation: 419 m (1,375 ft)

Population (2025)
  - Total: 2,138
- Time zone: UTC+1 (CET)
  - Summer (DST): UTC+2 (CEST)
- Postal code: 230 3
- Area code: +421 41
- Vehicle registration plate (until 2022): CA
- Website: www.zborovnadbystricou.sk/sk/

Zborov nad Bystricou (Hungarian: Felsőzboró) is a village and municipality in Čadca District in the Žilina Region of northern Slovakia.

== History ==
In historical records the village was first mentioned in 1662. Before 1918 the official name was Felsozboró, or only Zboró. The total population in 1910 was 1,607 which included mostly Roman Catholic Slovaks. The region was devastated by the attacks of Tartars in the 13th century and the first settlers came here after 1400AD (Stara Bystrica). Zborov nad Bystricou were founded by the Valach colonists in the 15th century.

== Geography ==
The municipality lies at an altitude of 419 metres (1,375 ft) and covers an area of 18.70 km^{2} (7.22 sq mi) (2025).

== Population ==
Population statistic (10 years)
Year	1995	2005	2015	2025
Count	2150	2283	2245	2138
Difference		+6.18%	−1.66%	−4.76%

Population statistic
Year	2024	2025
Count	2137	2138
Difference		+0.04%

It has a population of 2138 people (31 December 2025).

=== Ethnicity ===
Census 2021 (1+ %)
Ethnicity	Number	Fraction
Slovak	2163	98.9%
Total	2187	

In year 2021 was 2187 people by ethnicity 2163 as Slovak, 17 as Not found out, 16 as Czech, 5 as Other, 4 as Polish, 1 as Serbian, 1 as Romanian, 1 as Hungarian, 1 as Canadian and 1 as Bulgarian.

Note on population: The difference values of population numbers in the table "Population statistic" and in the sections "Ethnicity" & "Religion" is caused by the use of various statistical methods.

=== Religion ===
Census 2021 (1+ %)
Religion	Number	Fraction
Roman Catholic Church	2055	93.96%
None	77	3.52%
Total	2187	

In year 2021 was 2187 people by religion 2055 from Roman Catholic Church, 77 from None, 17 from Not found out, 9 from Evangelical Church, 6 from Greek Catholic Church, 5 from Calvinist Church, 5 from Christian Congregations in Slovakia, 5 from Other, 3 from Other and not ascertained christian church, 2 from Ad hoc movements, 1 from Eastern Orthodox Church, 1 from Jehovah's Witnesses and 1 from Islam.
