= Ochtiná =

Village and municipality in Slovakia

Ochtiná Martonháza
- Municipality
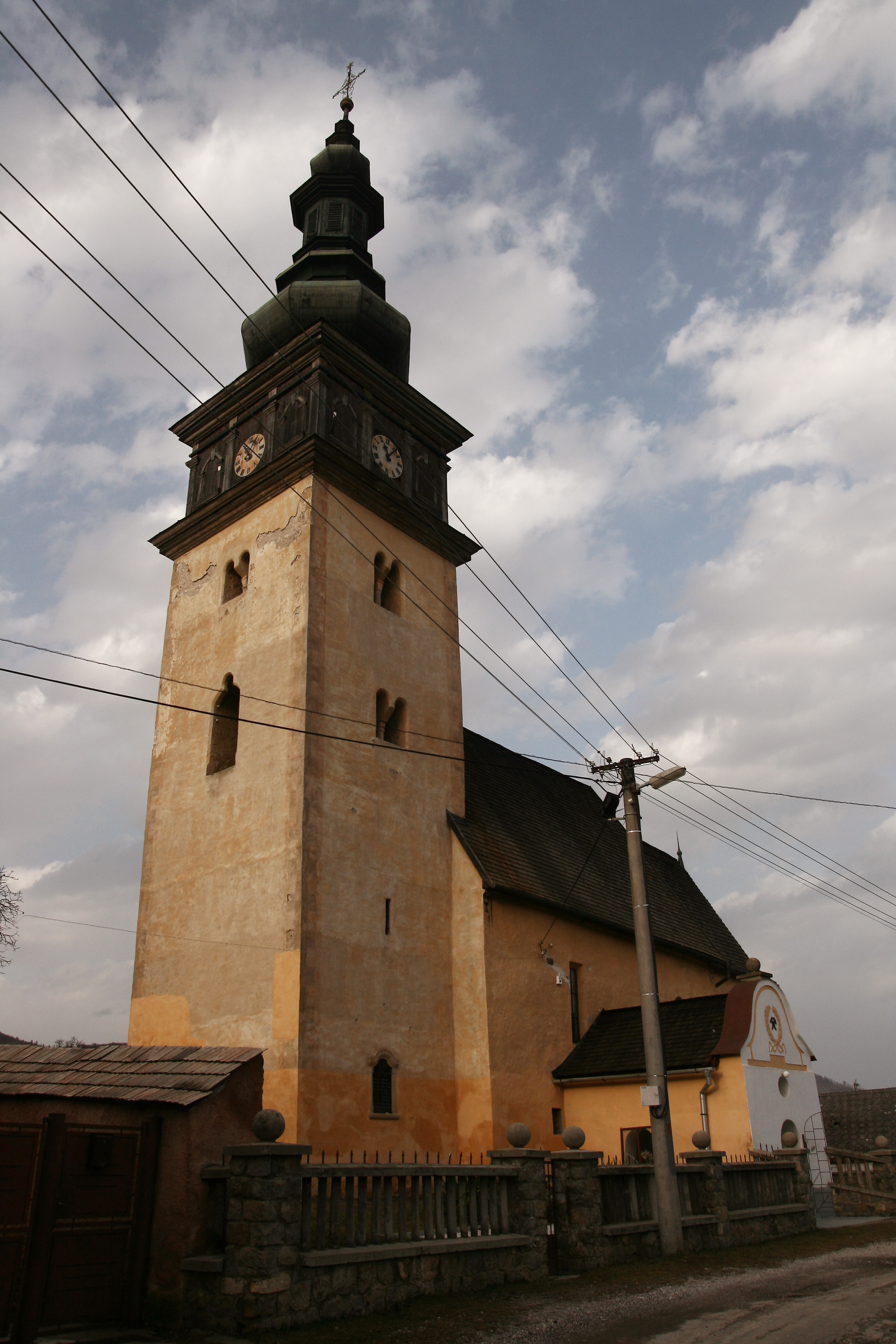
- Lutheran church

- Flag

- Location of Ochtiná in the Košice Region Location of Ochtiná in Slovakia
- Coordinates: 48.68°N 20.33°E
- Country: Slovakia
- Region: Košice Region
- District: Rožňava District
- First mentioned: 1243

Area
  - Total: 14.48 km^{2} (5.59 sq mi)
- Elevation: 338 m (1,109 ft)

Population (2025)
  - Total: 529
- Time zone: UTC+1 (CET)
  - Summer (DST): UTC+2 (CEST)
- Postal code: 493 5
- Area code: +421 58
- Vehicle registration plate (until 2022): RV
- Website: www.obecochtina.sk

Ochtiná (Hungarian: Martonháza) is a village and municipality in the Rožňava District in the Košice Region of middle-eastern Slovakia.

== History ==
In historical records the village was first mentioned in 1243. Before the establishment of independent Czechoslovakia in 1918, Ochtiná was part of Gömör and Kishont County within the Kingdom of Hungary. From 1939 to 1945, it was part of the Slovak Republic.

== Geography ==
The municipality lies at an altitude of 338 metres (1,109 ft) and covers an area of 14.48 km^{2} (5.59 sq mi) (2025).

== Population ==
Population statistic (10 years)
Year	1995	2005	2015	2025
Count	518	553	544	529
Difference		+6.75%	−1.62%	−2.75%

Population statistic
Year	2024	2025
Count	535	529
Difference		−1.12%

It has a population of 529 people (31 December 2025).

=== Ethnicity ===
Census 2021 (1+ %)
Ethnicity	Number	Fraction
Slovak	504	90.97%
Romani	80	14.44%
Not found out	43	7.76%
Total	554	

In year 2021 was 554 people by ethnicity 504 as Slovak, 80 as Romani, 43 as Not found out, 5 as Czech and 3 as Hungarian.

Note on population: The difference values of population numbers in the table "Population statistic" and in the sections "Ethnicity" & "Religion" is caused by the use of various statistical methods.

The vast majority of the municipality's population consists of the local Roma community. In 2019, they constituted an estimated 70% of the local population.

=== Religion ===
Census 2021 (1+ %)
Religion	Number	Fraction
Evangelical Church	260	46.93%
None	202	36.46%
Not found out	41	7.4%
Roman Catholic Church	28	5.05%
Greek Catholic Church	9	1.62%
United Methodist Church	7	1.26%
Total	554	

In year 2021 was 554 people by religion 260 from Evangelical Church, 202 from None, 41 from Not found out, 28 from Roman Catholic Church, 9 from Greek Catholic Church, 7 from United Methodist Church, 3 from Seventh-day Adventist Church, 2 from Other, 1 from Jehovah's Witnesses and 1 from Ad hoc movements.

== Culture ==
The village has a public library and a football pitch.
