= Historical Logging Switchback Railway =

Narrow-gauge railway in Slovakia

Coordinates: 49°22′57″N 19°06′00″E

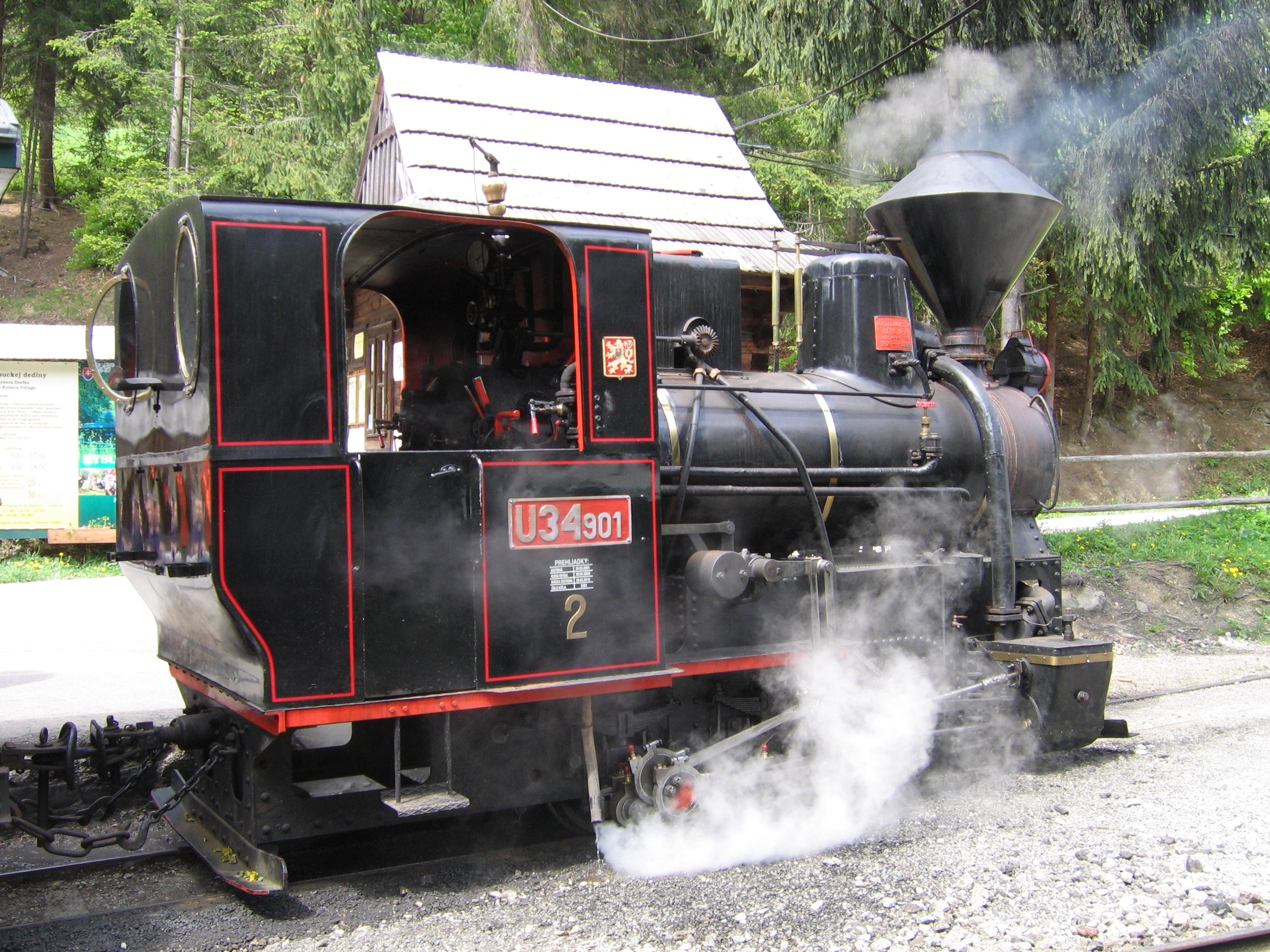
Steam locomotive MÁV U34.901, currently in use by Historical Logging Switchback Railway. Picture from May 2006

The 'Historical Logging Switchback Railway in Vychylovka (near Nová Bystrica, Slovakia) is a preserved section of the former narrow-gauge logging railway in the Kysuce and Orava regions. The railway ceased operation in 1971 and was largely dismantled, although parts of its infrastructure, including sections of the original switchback system, were retained. Today, a reconstructed section of approximately 3.6 km (2.2 mi) is operated as a heritage railway for tourism purposes.

== Vehicles ==
- Steam locomotive MÁV 2282/1909 (U34.901) – in service
- Steam locomotive MÁV 4281/1916 (U45.9) – in service until 1999
- Steam locomotive Kraus Maffei 15791/1940 – out of service
- Steam locomotive ČKD 2612/1948 – out of service
- Steam locomotive ČKD 1441/1928 – in service (this is the last locomotive that went along the disassembled track in 1972; Until 1990 placed as memorial in depot Žilina). Enthusiasts from the civic association Krúžok long fought for her rescue. A generous sponsorship donation to save the locomotive and its two-year repair allowed the historic machine in 2011 to return to the Oravan valleys and consider tourists.

== See also ==
- Čierny Hron Railway
- List of transport museums in Slovakia
- List of museums in Slovakia
