= Kysuce =

Traditional region of Slovakia

Coordinates: 49°23′N 18°46′E

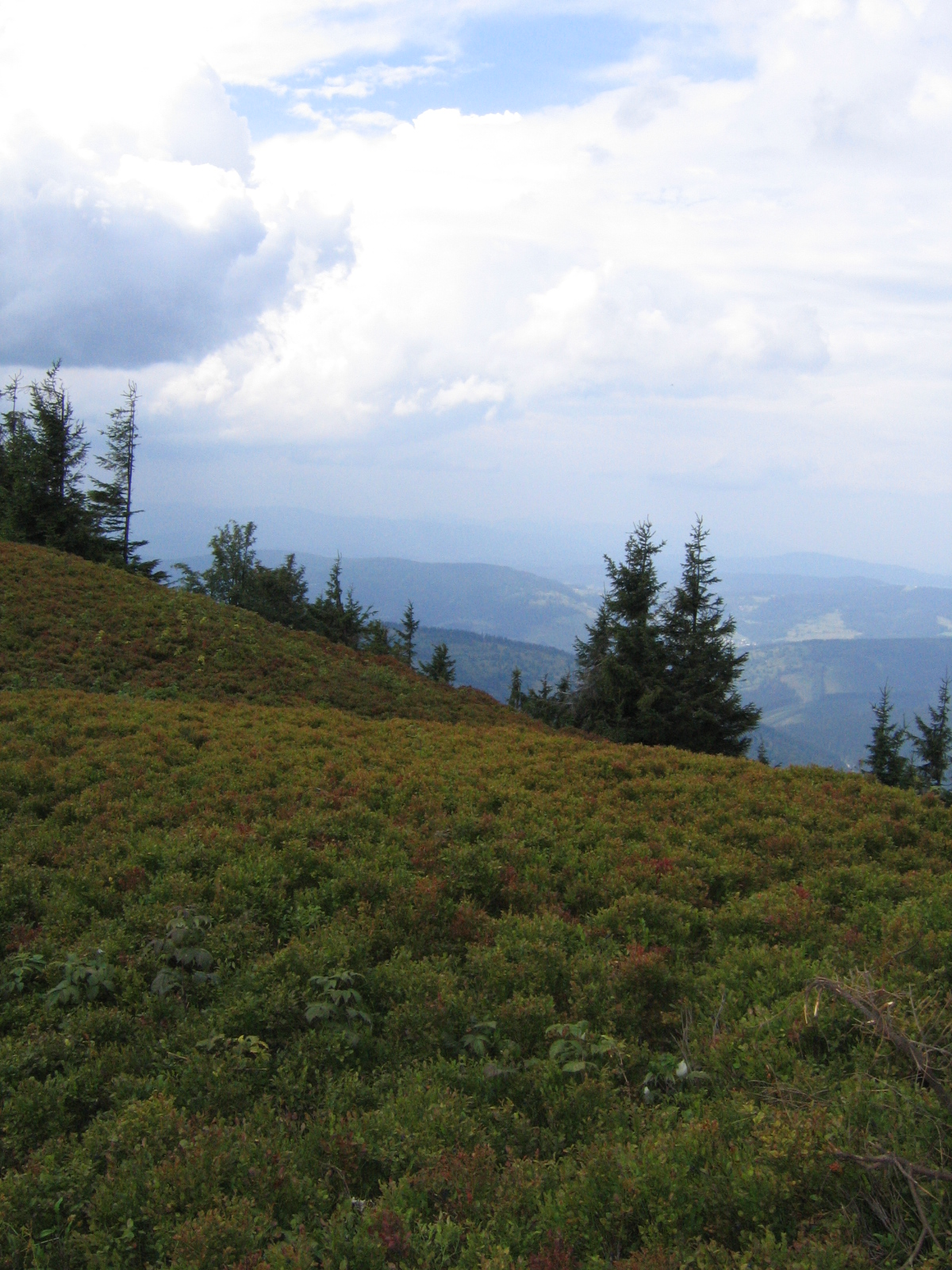
Kysuce region around Veľká Rača

Kysuce is a traditional informal name of a region in north-western Slovakia, situated around the Kysuca river and bordering the Orava region in the east, Poland in the north and the Czech Republic in the west. It consists of two districts: Čadca and Kysucké Nové Mesto. The northern part is called the Čadecké region and is part of the Goral Lands. The region is surrounded by the numerous mountain ranges, for example Javorníky with the highest hill Veľký Javorník (1,071 m) in the west, the Moravian-Silesian Beskids with the highest hill Veľký Polom (1,067 m) in the north. In the East there are Kysucké Beskydy with the highest mountain (also the highest in the region) – Veľká Rača (1,236 m) – the symbol of Kysuce. In the South there is Kysucká vrchovina with the highest hill – Ľadonhora (999 m). The oldest known settlement in Kysuce is the city Kysucké Nové Mesto, which is located on an important trade route through the region. The route connects north with south; it goes from Žilina through Jablunkov Pass, to Tešín.

== History ==
=== From Stone Age to antiquity ===
Archaeological foundings in Kysuce allow you to assume the presence of man on this territory already in the earlier Stone Age. This is evidenced by, for example, the findings of mammoths teeth and bones of a rhinosaurs, a fraction of patented clawed blade from Nezbudska Lúčka, and a spear from Ochodnica. An important place for archaeologists is Koscelisko in Radoľa. From there we have a hammer and blade from obsidian and various other fragments which can document settlement of Kysuce in Neolit, but also other findings from earlier periods. The largest fortification built in Kysuce was built by the local people on a small hill, Malý Vreten in Oškerda, which is located close to Kysucká brána. Found ceramics in the fort is thought to be dated back from the late Bronze Age or the beginning of the old Iron Age (8th–7th century BCE)

=== Middle ages ===
There is no evidence of human presence in Kysuce in the 1st century CE and it is believed that the territory began to be used again by the first Slavs in the 5th century CE. The oldest direct written record of Kysuce is Belos deed from 1244 which was for Bohumír, the son of Sebeslav; "... terram quandam in confinio Polonia... KisZudcze...“. This borders the property between the rivers Kysuca, Divinka and Vranie, around the same as the territory of the later Budatín estate.

In Radoľa were discovered the foundations of a church from around the 13th century. From historical documents, only data from the census of papal tithes (1332–1337), when the local pastor, Peter, paid tax 6 pennies and his rectory was the only one in the region, can be assigned. In the deed from 1244 Béla IV of Hungary gives Bohumír, the son of Sebeslav, territory west to Kysuce until the Polish borders on the north and river Vranie in the south. The core of this region was in 1254 town Jačatín, which was important as a toll station in 1321 and as a settlement growing into a city in 1325 – nowadays Kysucké Nové mesto.

From 1325 comes the first written mention of the village Krasno nad Kysucou – the oldest town in the north of Kysuce. In the 15th–16th century the village belonged to the parish Radoľa, later to parish Kysucké Nové Mesto. In the 1770s and 1780s the village belonged to the parish of Stará Bystrica. In 1788, created in Krasno nad Kysucou a separated parish with an affiliate in Zborov nad Bystricou. Krásno nad Kysucou now has a status of a city.

=== Modern age ===
From the period of the modern age comes great fortification Šance pri Mostoch near Jablunkov.

In 1535, the first time mentioned a new settlement Klubina first location in Kysuce established by the Wallachian law. In throwing Strečno, Bytča and old castle from 1540 mentions hills Zborov, Diedova and Blasovicz.

First mention of Čadca is located in a dispute over Hungary-Silesian border in 1565, which shows that as more permanent settlement started to develop only recently, got a name from a river Čadčianka (Čadečka). The landowners Budatín estate in 1572 was referred to as "Wes Cziatcza" that had Wallachian mayoralty, 2 peasant and one cotter homestead.

The landowners in 1572, in addition to Cadca first time in written documents also appears Lopušné. In 1578 states that privileged Vlachs are well established in Vadičov. Already in the 1580s several Wallachian sheep farms chorvarky concentrated in places Ochodnica, Stará Bystrica, Oščadnica, Zborov, Kalinov, Svrčinovec, Javorské, turned into villages, respectively. kopanice

In the second half of the 16th century incurred for shepherding rights settlements Dunajov, Ochodnica a Stará Bystrica.

The oldest settlement based on this law has been Turzovka. First mentioned in 1601, it was an established Bytča estate of Turzo and began to be built in the late 16th century.

Additional settlements of Kysuce colonization based on this law include: Olešná, Vysoká nad Kysucou (from the homesteads in the early 18th century. Settlement began to shape Makov) mentioned in 1619. Lodno, Horelica, Raková, Svrčinovec a Staškov are first mentioned in 1640. In 1641, Oščadnica is written. As a brand new complex provides landowners Nová Bystrica in 1662. Also Zborov, Pažite i Zákopčie are mentioned here as villages for the first time. Radôstka and Lutiše were built by the people of Stará Bystrica in around half of the 17th century. Čierne is mentioned in 1662 also built by locals.

In 1696, a new village Riečnica, which was shared by Löwenburgs homestead in 1713. In division and in the borders Riečnica in the border states and Nova Bystrica mentions Vychylovka settlement, which later developed into a separate village. New Bystrica was part of the "mons Havrjelka" and "aqua Oselnicza" below which arose later hamlets inhabitants of the Old and New Bystrica. Their association was founded in 1950 Harvelka village. At the same time arose the vast Turzovka, of which only recently created municipality Klokočov, Korňa and Dlhá nad Kysucou.

The Manor-house in Radola is one of the oldest historical monuments in Kysuce.

== Settlement ==
The oldest known settlement in the Kysuce region is Kysucké Nové Mesto, which was first mentioned in 1321 as a toll collecting place, which was part of a trade route between Žilina and Těšín via Jablunkov Pass, but otherwise the region was relatively uninhabited.

Kysuce region began to be settled in the 16th and 17th centuries at the time of Vlach colonization. The new inhabitants were mostly Slovaks, from foreign settlers Rusyns, Poles and Romanians, but also Czechs and Germans. Many towns were established first around this time, for example Čadca in 1572. Many people live in small villages or lone cottages in the mountains (which are called kopanice). Today main towns in the Kysuce region are Kysucké Nové Mesto, Čadca and Turzovka. The northern part of the region is inhabited by Gorals.

== Climate ==
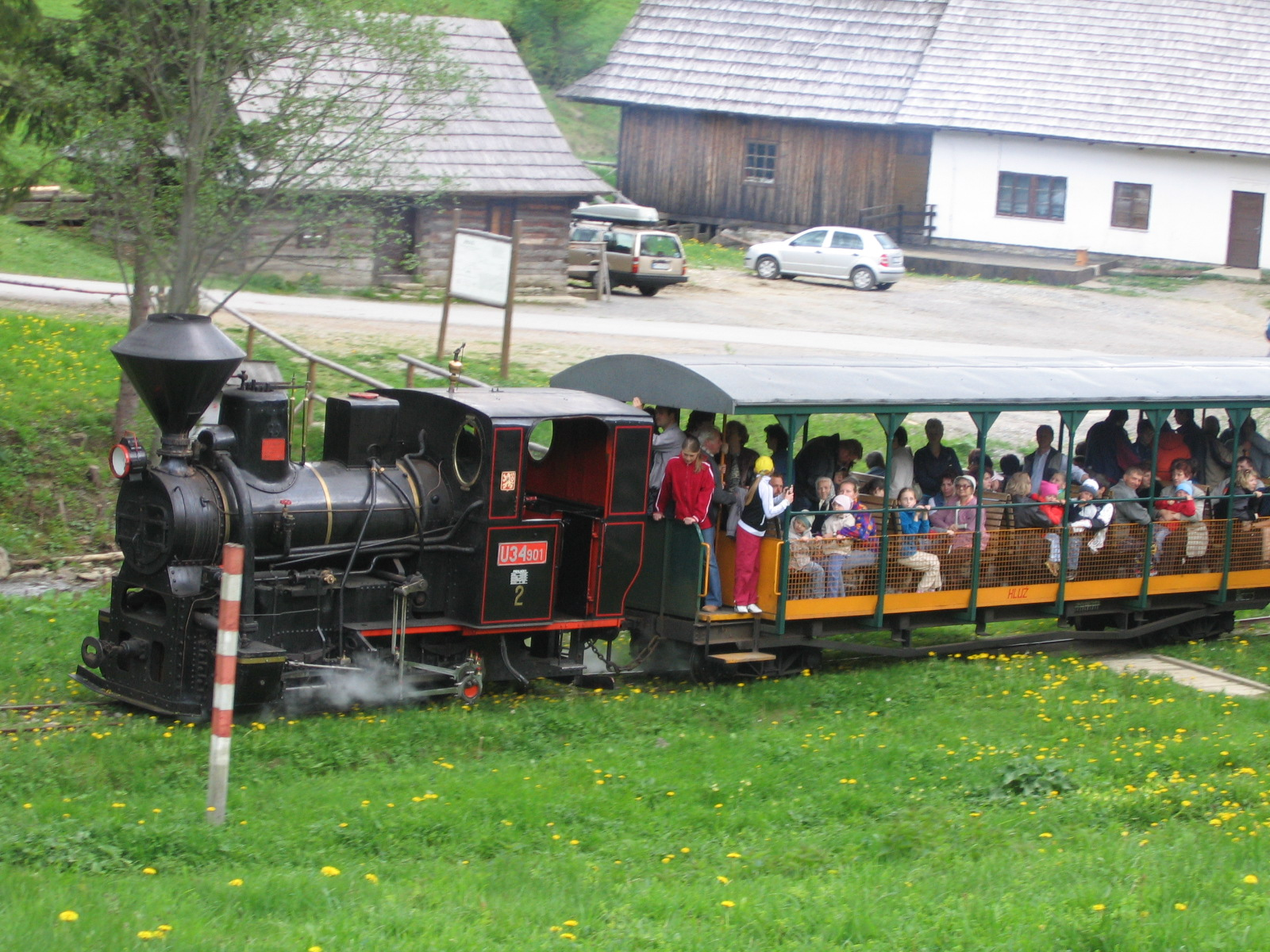
Steam locomotive on the switchback railway, Nová Bystrica, part Vychylovka

Like the neighboring Orava region, Kysuce region has long winters, long-lasting snow cover, and cold rainy weather in general, which causes the local people to feel the need to heat their homes from September or October until May. Many of the villages and cottages are difficult to access during the winter months.

== Economy ==
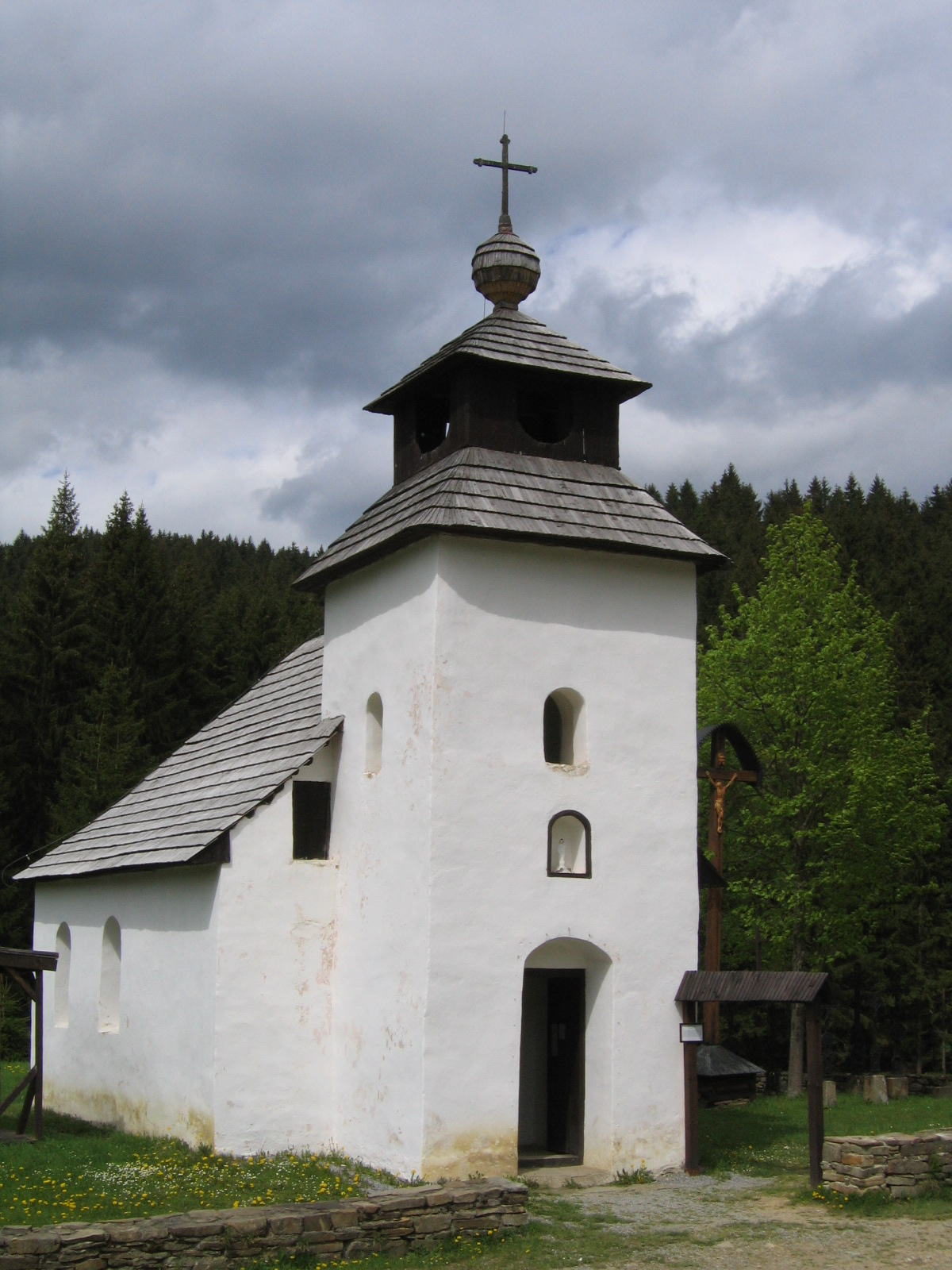
Chapel from the village Zborov nad Bystricou, now located in the open-air museum of Kysuce village

Traditionally, Kysuce was considered to be one of the poor regions in Slovakia. Inhabitants of Kysuce had to commute for work elsewhere, for example to the coal mines in the Ostrava Region in the Czech Republic, as the region has little industry. The worst situation was in the 1990s when many factories were shut down or reduced. However, the regional economy is now recovering and growing thanks to the good ski and cross-country conditions and the Snow Paradise center in Veľká Rača-Oščadnica is one of the most developed ski resorts in Slovakia, and car manufacturing companies. There are also many other tourist attractions available, for example the switchback railway near Nová Bystrica, or museum of the Kysuce village also near Nová Bystrica, which was created in 1974 primarily for the purpose of saving buildings from the villages inundated by the Nová Bystrica reservoir.

== Transport ==
The region is located at the main road and railway between Žilina and Ostrava, as well to Poland. The first railroad that connected Kysuce to the other parts of Austria-Hungary was built in 1871 as part of the Košice-Bohumín Railway. Currently, there is only one short part of the D3 motorway between Oščadnica and Čadca. Connection to Orava is currently under construction and should be opened in 2008. It should replace the original road, which was inundated along with the construction of Nová Bystrica reservoir, leaving 11 km gap between the two ends of formerly compact road.

== Notable people ==
- Ján Palárik
- Jozef Kroner
