= Oščadnica =

- Municipality
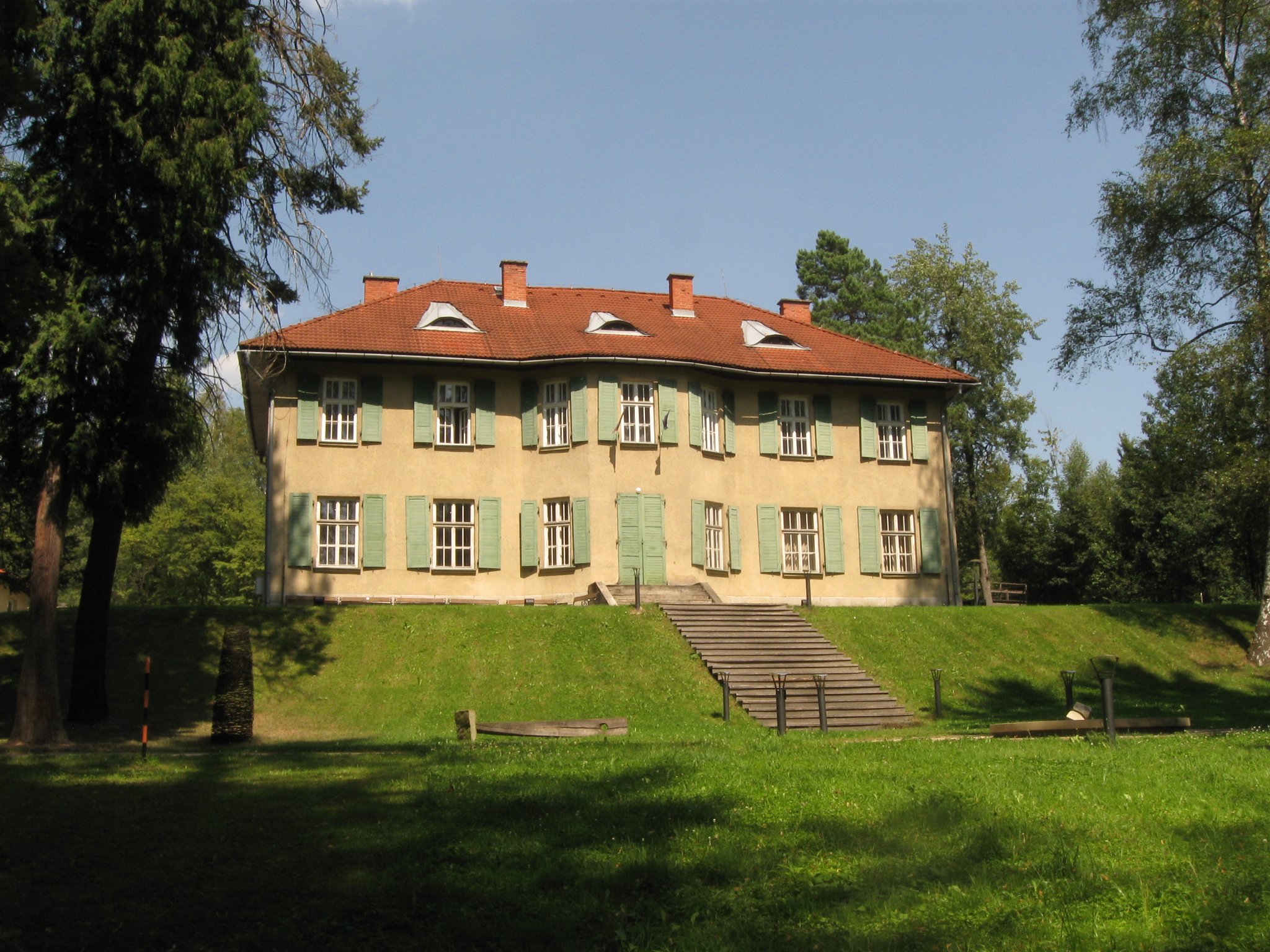
- Manor in the village

- Flag

- Location of Oščadnica in the Žilina Region Location of Oščadnica in Slovakia
- Coordinates: 49.43°N 18.88°E
- Country: Slovakia
- Region: Žilina Region
- District: Čadca District
- First mentioned: 1712

Area
  - Total: 58.63 km^{2} (22.64 sq mi)
- Elevation: 463 m (1,519 ft)

Population (2025)
  - Total: 5,780
- Time zone: UTC+1 (CET)
  - Summer (DST): UTC+2 (CEST)
- Postal code: 230 1
- Area code: +421 41
- Vehicle registration plate (until 2022): CA
- Website: www.oscadnica.sk

Oščadnica (Hungarian: Ócsad) is a large village and municipality in Čadca District, in the Žilina Region of northern Slovakia. It has 22 outlying settlements. The village is now an established tourist destination, offering private lodgings and agrobusiness. During the winter a ski resort located southeast of the village, Oščadnica-Veľká Rača, is a popular destination.

Within the village are plenty of bars and restaurants serving traditional Slovak food, along with typical Western fast foods.

== Location ==
Oščadnica lies in the northwestern part of Slovakia, below the Veľká Rača massif (1,236 m above sea level), the highest peak of the Kysucké Beskydy Mountains and the entire Kysuce region. The settlement begins in the vicinity of the confluence of the Kysuca river with the Oščadnica river and continues along it through a relatively narrow valley 13 km long. The Žilina - Čadca road and the Žilina - Český Těšín railway line lead through the western edge of the Kysuce valley, providing connections with large cities in the vicinity.

== History ==
Kysuce was not systematically settled until the 17th century, prior to which the region as a whole was inhabited quite sparsely. Although the first written mention of Oščadnica dates back to 1579, seasonal mountain huts were probably present in the area by 1500, with dwellings in the valley of today's village established by 1600. The territory initially belonged to the Budatín estate, and later to the Strečno estate. A census from 1658 states that Oščadnica was one of the larger villages, with a sawmill and a grain mill already operating there. The local population subsisted mainly on cattle and sheep breeding, lumbering, shingle production, and flax cultivation. In 1720 the village had three mills, and by 1828, nearly 3,000 inhabitants. In 1804 a Baroque-classicist style church was built on the site of a wooden church from 1788.

Isolated geographically, Kysuce was historically one of the poorer areas of the Kingdom of Hungary. As in the surrounding villages, an economic stimulus for Oščadnica was the extension of the Košice-Bohumín Railway in 1871. The railway helped to facilitate the transport of goods and people to regional markets and economic centers. Being located along one of the arteries to industrializing Moravia and Silesia helped to position the region for future economic development. However, insufficient economic opportunities relative to population growth and the Hungarian government's Magyarization policies of the late nineteenth - early twentieth centuries encouraged emigration out of the area, notably to the United States.

In the post-1989 transition to a capitalist economy, the emergence of the nearby Veľká Rača ski resort as a tourist destination has come with significant environmental impacts.

== Monuments ==
In the village there is the Church of the Assumption of the Virgin Mary (built 1804); a Calvary (built 1948); a manor house built 1910-1913 by Prussian junker Count Ballester, which since 1976 has housed an art gallery (Slovak: Kysucká galéria); and a Lourdes Cave.

== Geography ==
The municipality lies at an altitude of 463 metres (1,519 ft) and covers an area of 58.63 km^{2} (22.64 sq mi) (2025).

== Population ==
Population statistic (10 years)
| Year | 1995 | 2005 | 2015 | 2025 |
|---|---|---|---|---|
| Count | 5607 | 5749 | 5667 | 5780 |
| Difference | | +2.53% | −1.42% | +1.99% |

Population statistic
| Year | 2024 | 2025 |
|---|---|---|
| Count | 5807 | 5780 |
| Difference | | −0.46% |

It has a population of 5780 people (31 December 2025).

=== Ethnicity ===
Census 2021 (1+ %)
| Ethnicity | Number | Fraction |
|---|---|---|
| Slovak | 5527 | 96.35% |
| Not found out | 228 | 3.97% |
| Total | 5736 | |

In year 2021 was 5736 people by ethnicity 5527 as Slovak, 228 as Not found out, 46 as Czech, 14 as Polish, 12 as Russian, 9 as Other, 4 as Ukrainian, 4 as German, 2 as Irish, 2 as Italian, 2 as Romani, 2 as English, 1 as Vietnamese, 1 as Rusyn, 1 as Hungarian and 1 as Greek.

Note on population: The difference values of population numbers in the table "Population statistic" and in the sections "Ethnicity" & "Religion" is caused by the use of various statistical methods.

=== Religion ===
Census 2021 (1+ %)
| Religion | Number | Fraction |
|---|---|---|
| Roman Catholic Church | 5100 | 88.91% |
| None | 331 | 5.77% |
| Not found out | 194 | 3.38% |
| Total | 5736 | |

In year 2021 was 5736 people by religion 5100 from Roman Catholic Church, 331 from None, 194 from Not found out, 22 from Greek Catholic Church, 19 from Ad hoc movements, 18 from Evangelical Church, 10 from Jehovah's Witnesses, 10 from Christian Congregations in Slovakia, 6 from Paganism and natural spirituality, 6 from Other, 5 from Calvinist Church, 5 from Seventh-day Adventist Church, 3 from Other and not ascertained christian church, 3 from Buddhism, 1 from Old Catholic Church, 1 from Eastern Orthodox Church, 1 from Hinduism and 1 from Baptists Church.
