= Hrachovo =

Hrachovo Rimaráhó
- Municipality
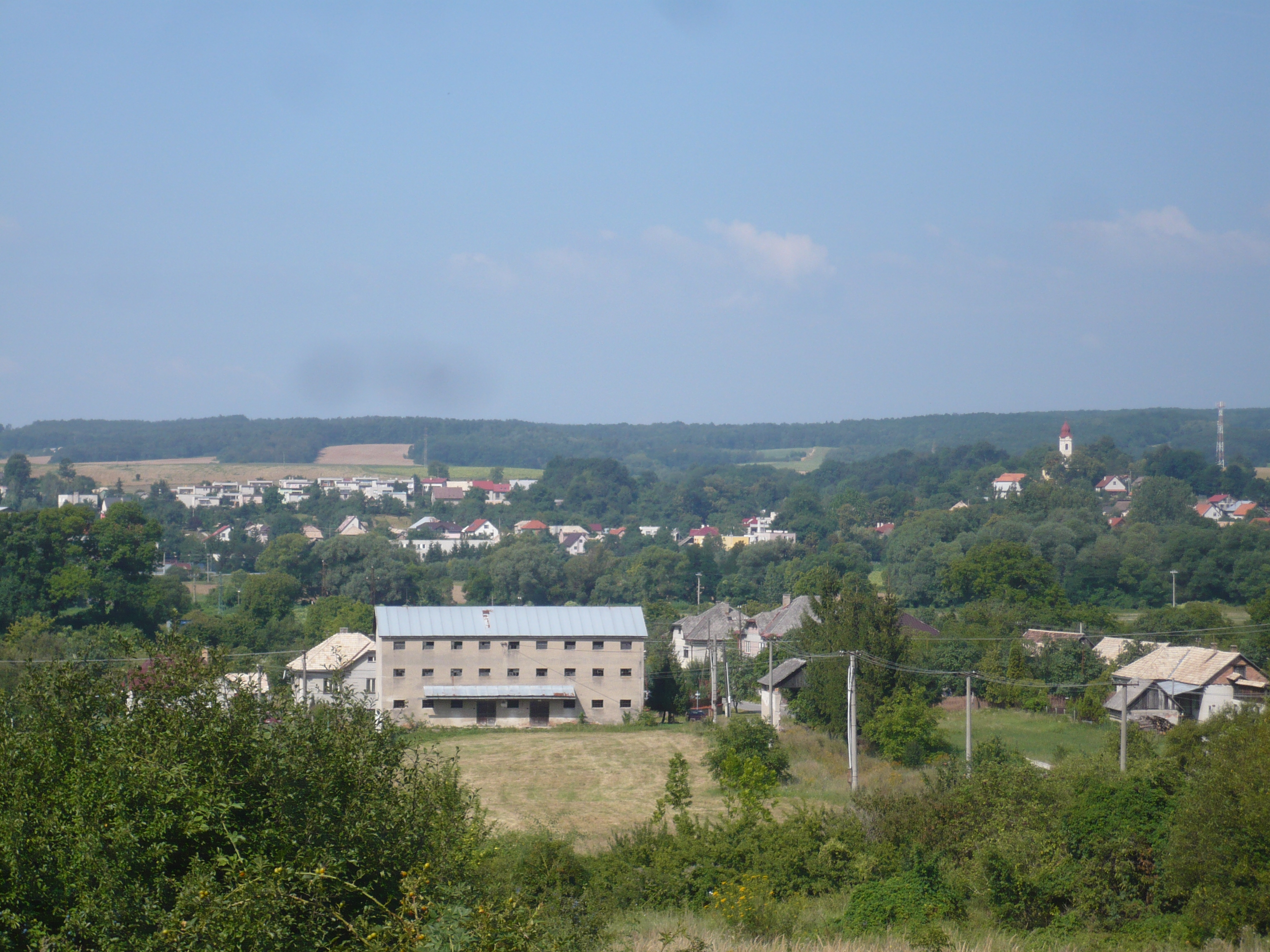
- View on Hrachovo

- Flag

- Location of Hrachovo in the Banská Bystrica Region Location of Hrachovo in Slovakia
- Coordinates: 48.46°N 19.95°E
- Country: Slovakia
- Region: Banská Bystrica Region
- District: Rimavská Sobota District
- First mentioned: 1353

Area
  - Total: 11.84 km^{2} (4.57 sq mi)
- Elevation: 288 m (945 ft)

Population (2025)
  - Total: 790
- Time zone: UTC+1 (CET)
  - Summer (DST): UTC+2 (CEST)
- Postal code: 980 52
- Area code: +421 47
- Vehicle registration plate (until 2022): RS
- Website: www.obechrachovo.sk

Hrachovo (formerly: Hrachou, Hungarian: Rimaráhó) is a village and municipality in the Rimavská Sobota District of the Banská Bystrica Region of southern Slovakia. The most important sightseeings are classical churches, evangelical and Roman Catholic, manor house and the castle, which is now in ruins.

== Geography ==
The municipality lies at an altitude of 288 metres (945 ft) and covers an area of 11.84 km^{2} (4.57 sq mi) (2025).

== Population ==
Population statistic (10 years)
| Year | 1995 | 2005 | 2015 | 2025 |
|---|---|---|---|---|
| Count | 853 | 860 | 853 | 790 |
| Difference | | +0.82% | −0.81% | −7.38% |

Population statistic
| Year | 2024 | 2025 |
|---|---|---|
| Count | 781 | 790 |
| Difference | | +1.15% |

It has a population of 790 people (31 December 2025).

=== Ethnicity ===
Census 2021 (1+ %)
| Ethnicity | Number | Fraction |
|---|---|---|
| Slovak | 771 | 96.49% |
| Not found out | 16 | 2% |
| Hungarian | 13 | 1.62% |
| Total | 799 | |

In year 2021 was 799 people by ethnicity 771 as Slovak, 16 as Not found out, 13 as Hungarian, 4 as Ukrainian, 2 as Czech, 2 as Irish and 1 as Russian.

Note on population: The difference values of population numbers in the table "Population statistic" and in the sections "Ethnicity" & "Religion" is caused by the use of various statistical methods.

=== Religion ===
Census 2021 (1+ %)
| Religion | Number | Fraction |
|---|---|---|
| Roman Catholic Church | 424 | 53.07% |
| None | 214 | 26.78% |
| Evangelical Church | 128 | 16.02% |
| Not found out | 18 | 2.25% |
| Total | 799 | |

In year 2021 was 799 people by religion 424 from Roman Catholic Church, 214 from None, 128 from Evangelical Church, 18 from Not found out, 3 from Calvinist Church, 2 from Eastern Orthodox Church, 2 from Greek Catholic Church, 2 from Apostolic Church, 2 from Ad hoc movements, 1 from Other and not ascertained christian church, 1 from Jehovah's Witnesses, 1 from United Methodist Church and 1 from Baptists Church.

== Genealogical resources ==
The records for genealogical research are available at the state archive "Statny Archiv in Banska Bystrica, Slovakia"

- Roman Catholic church records (births/marriages/deaths): 1769-1851 (parish A)
- Greek Catholic church records (births/marriages/deaths): 1713-1883 (parish A)

== See also ==
- List of municipalities and towns in Slovakia
