= Nová Bystrica =

- Municipality
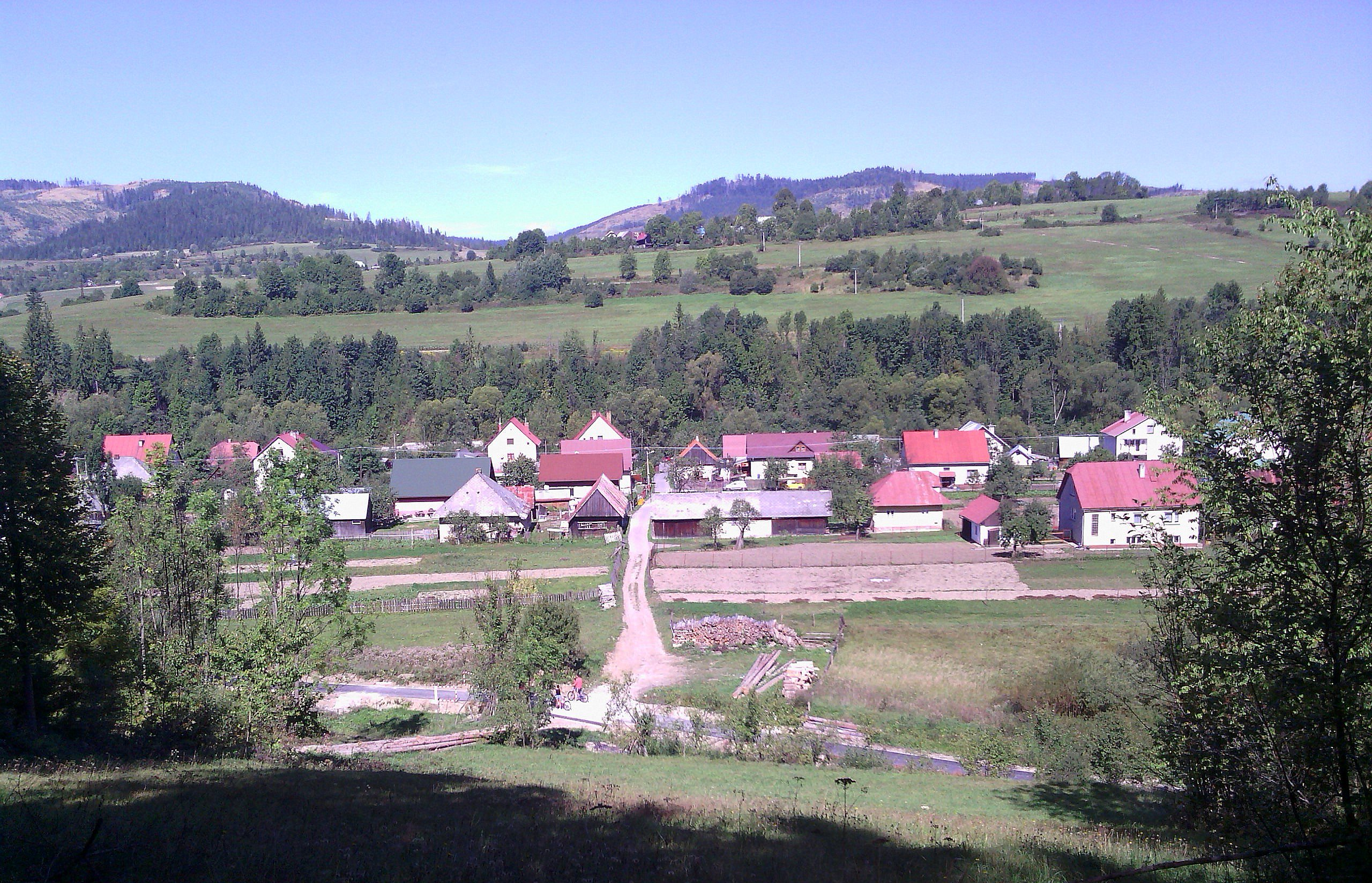

- Flag Coat of arms

- Location of Nová Bystrica in the Žilina Region Location of Nová Bystrica in Slovakia
- Coordinates: 49.35°N 19.02°E
- Country: Slovakia
- Region: Žilina Region
- District: Čadca District
- First mentioned: 1662

Area
  - Total: 125.26 km^{2} (48.36 sq mi)
- Elevation: 593 m (1,946 ft)

Population (2025)
  - Total: 2,557
- Time zone: UTC+1 (CET)
  - Summer (DST): UTC+2 (CEST)
- Postal code: 230 5
- Area code: +421 41
- Vehicle registration plate (until 2022): CA
- Website: www.novabystrica.sk/sk/

Nová Bystrica (Hungarian: Újbeszterce) is a village and municipality in Čadca District in the Žilina Region of northern Slovakia, in the Kysuce region.

== History ==
In historical records the village was first mentioned in 1662.

== Geography ==
The municipality lies at an altitude of 593 metres (1,946 ft) and covers an area of 125.26 km^{2} (48.36 sq mi) (2025). It is located in the Bystrica river valley.

== Population ==
Population statistic (10 years)
Year	1995	2005	2015	2025
Count	2953	2876	2777	2557
Difference		−2.60%	−3.44%	−7.92%

Population statistic
Year	2024	2025
Count	2570	2557
Difference		−0.50%

It has a population of 2557 people (31 December 2025).

=== Ethnicity ===
Census 2021 (1+ %)
Ethnicity	Number	Fraction
Slovak	2613	97.5%
Not found out	65	2.42%
Total	2680	

In year 2021 was 2680 people by ethnicity 2613 as Slovak, 65 as Not found out, 24 as Czech, 3 as Other, 2 as Russian, 1 as Irish and 1 as Ukrainian.

Note on population: The difference values of population numbers in the table "Population statistic" and in the sections "Ethnicity" & "Religion" is caused by the use of various statistical methods.

=== Religion ===
Census 2021 (1+ %)
Religion	Number	Fraction
Roman Catholic Church	2407	89.81%
None	130	4.85%
Not found out	90	3.36%
Total	2680	

In year 2021 was 2680 people by religion 2407 from Roman Catholic Church, 130 from None, 90 from Not found out, 14 from Christian Congregations in Slovakia, 9 from Evangelical Church, 7 from Greek Catholic Church, 6 from Other, 5 from Paganism and natural spirituality, 3 from Calvinist Church, 3 from Ad hoc movements, 2 from Eastern Orthodox Church, 2 from Other and not ascertained christian church, 1 from Jehovah's Witnesses and 1 from Baptists Church.

== Tourism ==
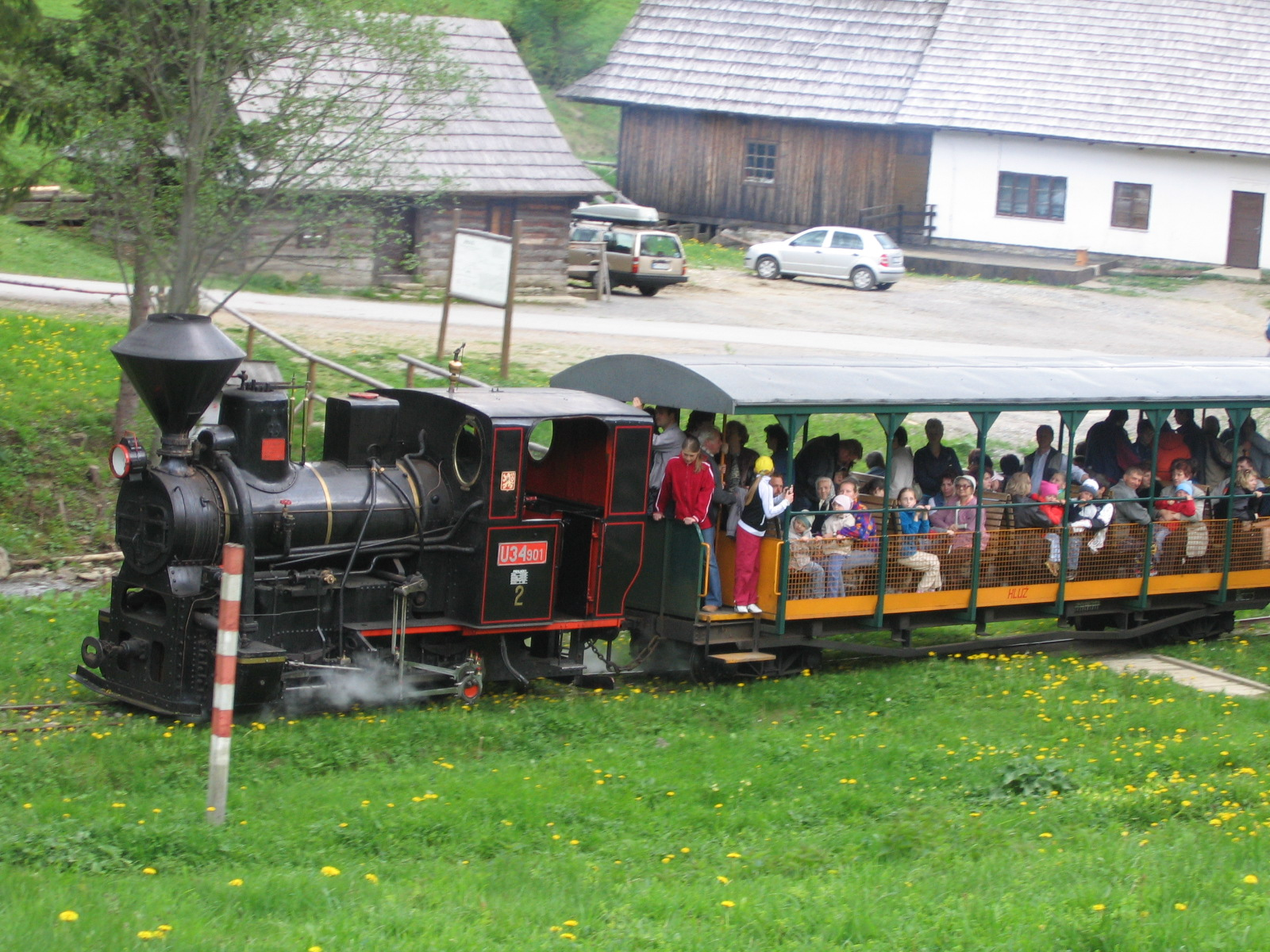
Steam locomotive on the switchback railway

In the local part Vychylovka, around 4 km further north-east, tourists can find some interesting attractions: the switchback railway, open-air museum of Kysuce village, established in 1974 primarily to save buildings from the now non-existing villages Riečnica and Harvelka, which were inundated by the Nová Bystrica reservoir, though it contains buildings from the other villages as well. It has also protected Vychylovka banks on the local Vychylovka stream and Vychylovka rocks.
