= Nesluša =

- Municipality
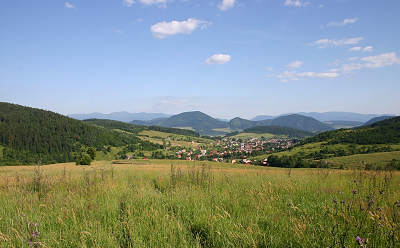

- Flag

- Location of Nesluša in the Žilina Region Location of Nesluša in Slovakia
- Coordinates: 49.32°N 18.75°E
- Country: Slovakia
- Region: Žilina Region
- District: Kysucké Nové Mesto District
- First mentioned: 1367

Area
  - Total: 25.47 km^{2} (9.83 sq mi)
- Elevation: 417 m (1,368 ft)

Population (2025)
  - Total: 3,167
- Time zone: UTC+1 (CET)
  - Summer (DST): UTC+2 (CEST)
- Postal code: 234 1
- Area code: +421 41
- Vehicle registration plate (until 2022): KM
- Website: www.neslusa.sk

Nesluša (Hungarian: Neszlény) is a village and municipality in the Kysucké Nové Mesto District in the Zilina Region of northern Slovakia.

== Etymology ==
The name probably comes from Slovak neslušný (rude, naughty, socially unacceptable). It could be also derived from neslušať (not to hear something) - "the hidden village", "the village you hear nothing about". Nezlusa 1367, Neszlusa 1438, Neslussa Walachorum 1598, Neszlussa 1773, Nesluša 1920.

== History ==
In historical records the village was first mentioned in 1367.

== Geography ==
The municipality lies at an altitude of 417 metres (1,368 ft) and covers an area of 25.47 km^{2} (9.83 sq mi) (2025). The highest hill in the village is Jakubovský vrch at 875 metres (2,871 ft). The second highest hill is Žiar at 869 metres (2,851 ft). The lowest place is Nádolie at 370 metres (1,210 ft). The village has many mineral springs. Nesluša is situated between green hills. The main creek is called Neslušanka. The village is adjacent to the municipalities of Kysucké Nové Mesto, Ochodnica, Zákopčie, Dlhá nad Kysucou, Rudinská and Rudina.

== Culture ==
=== Žiarinka ===
Žiarinka is a musical ensemble that was established in 1995. The principal instrument of the ensemble is the mandolin. Children also play the guitar, accordion, keyboards, flute and drums. Their repertory is wide and includes sequences from operas, extravaganzas, waltzes, polkas, movie melodies and marches. To the present they have performed over 200 recitals. Performances were in various national towns, as well as abroad in Germany, Yugoslavia, Poland and the Czech Republic.

== Population ==
Population statistic (10 years)
Year	1995	2005	2015	2025
Count	3220	3244	3156	3167
Difference		+0.74%	−2.71%	+0.34%

Population statistic
Year	2024	2025
Count	3191	3167
Difference		−0.75%

It has a population of 3167 people (31 December 2025).

=== Ethnicity ===
Census 2021 (1+ %)
Ethnicity	Number	Fraction
Slovak	2926	92.44%
Not found out	247	7.8%
Total	3165	

In year 2021 was 3165 people by ethnicity 2926 as Slovak, 247 as Not found out, 23 as Czech, 9 as Romani, 8 as Other, 4 as German, 4 as Bulgarian, 2 as Russian, 1 as Jewish, 1 as Polish, 1 as Moravian, 1 as Hungarian and 1 as Albanian.

Note on population: The difference values of population numbers in the table "Population statistic" and in the sections "Ethnicity" & "Religion" is caused by the use of various statistical methods.

=== Religion ===
Census 2021 (1+ %)
Religion	Number	Fraction
Roman Catholic Church	2544	80.38%
None	291	9.19%
Not found out	248	7.84%
Total	3165	

In year 2021 was 3165 people by religion 2544 from Roman Catholic Church, 291 from None, 248 from Not found out, 19 from Jehovah's Witnesses, 19 from Evangelical Church, 15 from Greek Catholic Church, 6 from Ad hoc movements, 5 from Other and not ascertained christian church, 5 from Christian Congregations in Slovakia, 3 from Eastern Orthodox Church, 2 from Calvinist Church, 2 from Islam, 2 from Buddhism, 1 from Jewish community, 1 from Other, 1 from United Methodist Church and 1 from Church of Jesus Christ of Latter-day Saints.

=== Historical demography ===
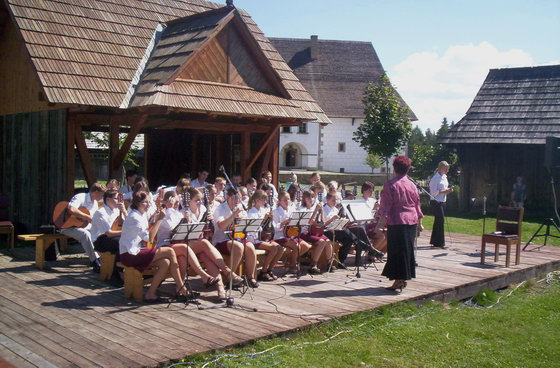
Nesluša's music ensemble Žiarinka

- 1715 – 792 inhabitants
- 1828 – 2498 inhabitants
- 1869 – 2032 inhabitants
- 1880 – 1746 inhabitants
- 1890 – 1912 inhabitants
- 1900 – 1997 inhabitants
- 1910 – 2288 inhabitants
- 1921 – 2483 inhabitants
- 1930 – 2746 inhabitants
- 1940 – 3153 inhabitants
- 1948 – 3155 inhabitants
- 1961 – 4045 inhabitants
- 1970 – 4045 inhabitants
- 1975 – 3412 inhabitants
- 1980 – 3645 inhabitants
- 1990 – 3263 inhabitants
- 2006 – 3205 inhabitants

== Parts of the village ==
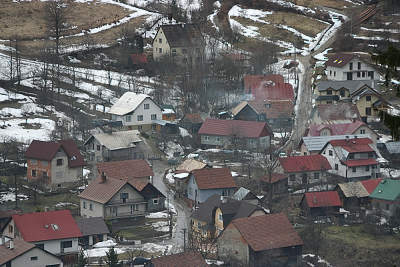
Nesluša

- u Adamkov
- u Burďakov
- Červené
- Drndovce
- Guckovce
- Halúskovce
- Holovce
- Homoľovce
- Chovancovce
- Janáčovce
- Jancovce
- Juríčkovce
- Klimkovce
- Kozí vŕšok
- Krúpovce
- Kutiny
- Na Kavuli
- Na Lane
- Na Vyšnej ceste
- Na pastovníku
- Pri Mlyne
- Na Žrebíkoch
- Parišovce
- Paukovce
- Platkovce
- Puškátka
- Skokanovce
- Sucháňovce
- Štrbavovce
- Tabakovce
- Vlkovce

=== Parts of village in highland ===
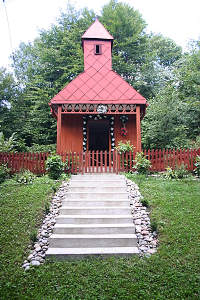
Bielovce

- Balošákovce
- Čulákovce
- Grešákovce
- Horná Suchá
- U Hutyrov
- U Jurdov
- Kantorovce
- Kubalovce
- Liskovce
- U Bielych
- U Haľamov
- Majtánky
- Mičekovce
- Ondruškovci
- Ostré
- Petránky
- Rapaňovce
- Stredná Suchá
- Šindelná
- Škorvanovce
- Tabačkovce
- U Samuhlích

== Sport ==
=== Hockeyball ===
- Pivní skauti (Beer Scouts) is a hockeyball team playing in the Nesluša hockeyball league.

== Accommodation ==
- Hotel Les
- Centrum

== Politics ==
The mayor is Zuzana Jancová.
