= Juraj Dančík =

Slovak footballer

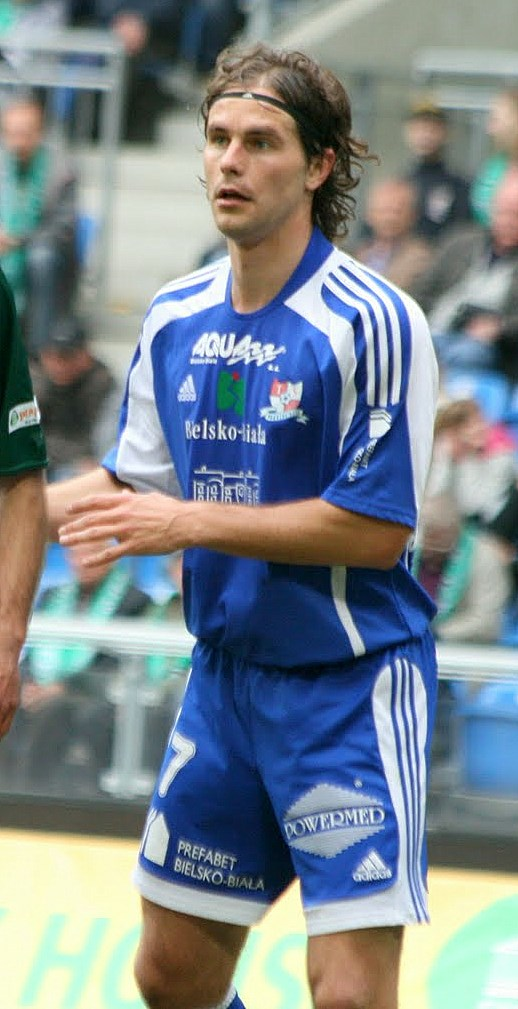

Personal information
- Date of birth: 21 February 1982 (age 44)
- Place of birth: Czechoslovakia
- Height: 1.89 m (6 ft 2 1/2 in)
- Position: Defender

Team information
- Current team: BKS Stal Bielsko-Biała
- Number: 10

Senior career*
Years	Team	Apps	(Gls)
2000–2002	MŠK Žilina	11	(0)
2002–2003	FK Senica		
2004–2006	Kysucký Lieskovec	38	(0)
2006–2007	Skałka Żabnica	26	(0)
2007–2014	Podbeskidzie Bielsko-Biała	115	(5)
2014–2017	BKS Stal Bielsko-Biała	63	(7)
2018–2019	GLKS Wilkowice	52	(10)
2020–	BKS Stal Bielsko-Biała	61	(6)
- * Club domestic league appearances and goals as of 15:44, 27 June 2025 (UTC)

Juraj Dančík (born 21 February 1982) is a Slovak footballer who plays as a defender for Polish V liga club BKS Stal Bielsko-Biała.

== Honours ==
MŠK Žilina

- Slovak First Football League: 2001–02
