= Lopušné Pažite =

Village in Slovakia

- Municipality
- Flag

- Location of Lopušné Pažite in the Žilina Region Location of Lopušné Pažite in Slovakia
- Coordinates: 49.28°N 18.85°E
- Country: Slovakia
- Region: Žilina Region
- District: Kysucké Nové Mesto District
- First mentioned: 1598

Government
  - Mayor: Anton Mrmus

Area
  - Total: 4.26 km^{2} (1.64 sq mi)
- Elevation: 426 m (1,398 ft)

Population (2025)
  - Total: 434
- Time zone: UTC+1 (CET)
  - Summer (DST): UTC+2 (CEST)
- Postal code: 233 6
- Area code: +421 41
- Vehicle registration plate (until 2022): KM
- Website: www.obeclopusnepazite.sk

Lopušné Pažite (Hungarian: Pázsitos) is a village and municipality in the Kysucké Nové Mesto District in the Žilina Region of northern Slovakia. Lopušné Pažite was created by merging the former villages of Lopušná and Pažite in 1946.

== History ==
Because Lopušné Pažite was merged from two towns, their origins also begin separately. The first mention of the older village Lopušné was in 1572. At that time, the village belonged to the Budatín estate and had one taxed and two untaxed farmsteads with one jailer and was based on Wallachian law. In 1598, the village grew to 7 houses. In 1720, the village grew to 9 taxpayers and jailers. Lastly in 1828; agriculture, sheep farming, and beekeeping became the primary economic focus of the town, and the village had grown to 24 houses and 236 inhabitants. The village of Pažite on is first mentioned in 1662 as a manor, belonging to the Strepnian estate. In 1784, sheep farming became the primary economic focus of the village, also containing 15 houses, 16 families and 92 inhabitants. The village church belonged to the parish of Horný Vadičov.

Following World War II in 1946, Lopušné Pažite was created by merging the former villages of Lopušná and Pažite.

== Geography ==
The village is located in the central part of the Kysucká Highlands in the valley of the Vadičov brook. It has forests on the perimeter, the central and eastern areas of the village are mainly deforested. Brown forest soil is the most common soil type. The municipality lies at an altitude of 426 metres (1,398 ft) and covers an area of 4.26 km^{2} (1.64 sq mi) (2025).

== Population ==
Population statistic (10 years)
Year	1995	2005	2015	2025
Count	448	447	473	434
Difference		−0.22%	+5.81%	−8.24%

Population statistic
Year	2024	2025
Count	436	434
Difference		−0.45%

It has a population of 434 people (31 December 2025).

=== Ethnicity ===
Census 2021 (1+ %)
Ethnicity	Number	Fraction
Slovak	432	97.95%
Not found out	8	1.81%
Total	441	

In year 2021 was 441 people by ethnicity 432 as Slovak, 8 as Not found out, 3 as Hungarian, 2 as Czech, 1 as Ukrainian and 1 as Russian.

Note on population: The difference values of population numbers in the table "Population statistic" and in the sections "Ethnicity" & "Religion" is caused by the use of various statistical methods.

=== Religion ===
Census 2021 (1+ %)
Religion	Number	Fraction
Roman Catholic Church	399	90.48%
None	22	4.99%
Not found out	5	1.13%
Total	441	

In year 2021 was 441 people by religion 399 from Roman Catholic Church, 22 from None, 5 from Not found out, 4 from Christian Congregations in Slovakia, 4 from Greek Catholic Church, 4 from Evangelical Church, 1 from Paganism and natural spirituality, 1 from Hinduism and 1 from Ad hoc movements.

== See also ==
- List of municipalities and towns in Slovakia
