= Kysucké Nové Mesto District =

Coordinates: 49°18′7″N 18°47′12″E

- District
- Country: Slovakia
- Region (kraj): Žilina Region
- Cultural region: Kysuce
- Seat: Kysucké Nové Mesto

Area
  - Total: 173.68 km^{2} (67.06 sq mi)

Population (2025)
  - Total: 32,370
- Time zone: UTC+1 (CET)
  - Summer (DST): UTC+2 (CEST)
- Telephone prefix: 041
- Vehicle registration plate (until 2022): KM
- Municipalities: 14

Kysucké Nové Mesto District (okres Kysucké Nové Mesto) is a district in the Žilina Region of northern central Slovakia, in the Kysuce region. It is entirely surrounded by the Žilina and Čadca districts. Apart from the city districts in Bratislava and Košice, its area is the smallest of all Slovakia districts, although population density is the second highest in Slovakia. The district had been established in 1923 and in its current borders exists from 1996. Core of the district economy is engineering industry, performed by several companies foremost in Kysucké Nové Mesto industrial park. The administrative seat is the town of Kysucké Nové Mesto, although many residents daily travel to Źilina for work, shopping, or education.

== Population ==
Population statistic (10 years)
Year	1995	2005	2015	2025
Count	33,117	33,950	33,088	32,370
Difference		+2.51%	−2.53%	−2.16%

Population statistic
Year	2024	2025
Count	32,540	32,370
Difference		−0.52%

It has a population of 32,370 people (31 December 2025).

Historical population
Year	Pop.	±%
1970	28,172	—
1980	31,615	+12.2%
1991	32,827	+3.8%
2001	33,778	+2.9%
2011	33,308	−1.4%
2021	32,699	−1.8%
Source: Statistical Office of the Slovak Republic

=== Ethnicity ===
Census 2021 (1+ %)
Ethnicity	Number	Fraction
Slovak	31,098	93.73%
Not found out	1512	4.55%
Total	33,178	

In year 2021 was 33,178 people by ethnicity 31,098 as Slovak, 1512 as Not found out, 254 as Czech, 86 as Other, 27 as Polish, 25 as Russian, 25 as Hungarian, 21 as Romani, 20 as German, 17 as Rusyn, 14 as Vietnamese, 14 as Ukrainian, 10 as Italian, 8 as Jewish, 7 as Austrian, 6 as Moravian, 6 as English, 5 as Greek, 5 as Bulgarian, 4 as Chinese, 4 as Irish, 4 as Albanian, 2 as Romanian, 2 as French, 1 as Serbian and 1 as Korean.

Note on population: The difference values of population numbers in the table "Population statistic" and in the sections "Ethnicity" & "Religion" is caused by the use of various statistical methods.

=== Religion ===
Census 2021 (1+ %)
Religion	Number	Fraction
Roman Catholic Church	25,943	79.34%
None	4043	12.36%
Not found out	1771	5.42%
Total	32,699	

In year 2021 was 32,699 people by religion 25,943 from Roman Catholic Church, 4043 from None, 1771 from Not found out, 194 from Evangelical Church, 168 from Christian Congregations in Slovakia, 158 from Greek Catholic Church, 75 from Ad hoc movements, 62 from Other, 61 from Other and not ascertained christian church, 57 from Calvinist Church, 47 from Jehovah's Witnesses, 29 from Buddhism, 21 from Eastern Orthodox Church, 17 from Paganism and natural spirituality, 9 from Jewish community, 9 from Islam, 8 from Seventh-day Adventist Church, 6 from United Methodist Church, 5 from Old Catholic Church, 5 from Church of the Brethren, 4 from Apostolic Church, 2 from Hinduism, 2 from Czechoslovak Hussite Church, 2 from Baptists Church and 1 from Church of Jesus Christ of Latter-day Saints.

== Municipalities ==
Municipality	Area [km^{2}]	Population
Dolný Vadičov	5.95	594
Horný Vadičov	20.81	1,729
Kysucké Nové Mesto	26.41	14,213
Kysucký Lieskovec	12.32	2,324
Lodno	8.84	941
Lopušné Pažite	4.26	434
Nesluša	25.47	3,167
Ochodnica	18.05	1,915
Povina	19.12	1,130
Radoľa	6.72	1,537
Rudina	6.27	1,786
Rudinka	3.13	419
Rudinská	10.76	1,044
Snežnica	5.51	1,137

Population and area values are current for year 2025.
