= Lodno =

- Municipality
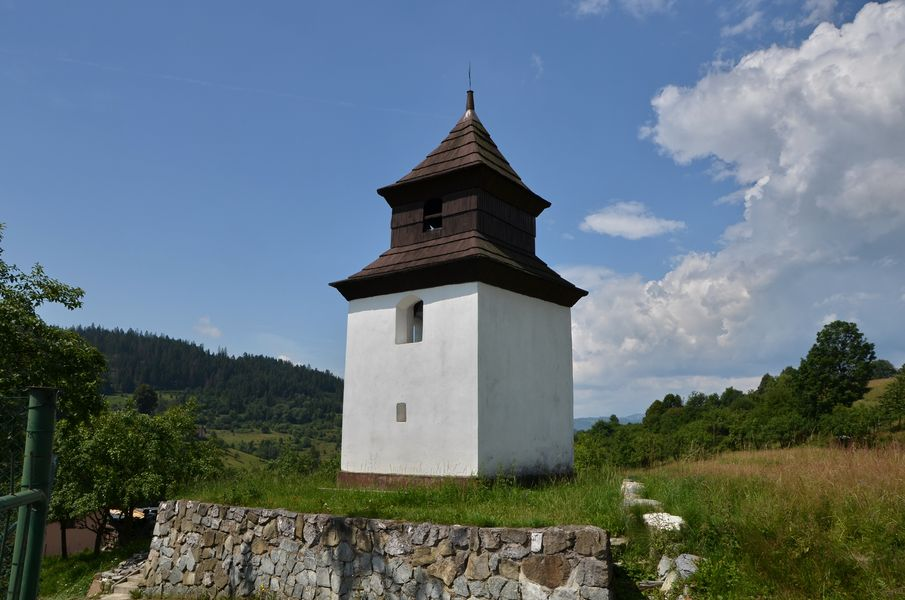

- Location of Lodno in the Žilina Region Location of Lodno in Slovakia
- Coordinates: 49.33°N 18.88°E
- Country: Slovakia
- Region: Žilina Region
- District: Kysucké Nové Mesto District
- First mentioned: 1658

Government
  - Mayor: Miloš Belan (KDH)

Area
  - Total: 8.84 km^{2} (3.41 sq mi)
- Elevation: 473 m (1,552 ft)

Population (2025)
  - Total: 941
- Time zone: UTC+1 (CET)
  - Summer (DST): UTC+2 (CEST)
- Postal code: 233 4
- Area code: +421 41
- Vehicle registration plate (until 2022): KM
- Website: www.obec-lodno.sk

Lodno (Hungarian: Lodnó) is a village and municipality in Kysucké Nové Mesto District in the Zilina Region of northern Slovakia.

== History ==
In historical records the village was first mentioned in 1658.

== Geography ==
The municipality lies at an altitude of 473 metres (1,552 ft) and covers an area of 8.84 km^{2} (3.41 sq mi) (2025).

== Population ==
Population statistic (10 years)
Year	1995	2005	2015	2025
Count	896	993	997	941
Difference		+10.82%	+0.40%	−5.61%

Population statistic
Year	2024	2025
Count	967	941
Difference		−2.68%

It has a population of 941 people (31 December 2025).

=== Ethnicity ===
Census 2021 (1+ %)
Ethnicity	Number	Fraction
Slovak	947	97.52%
Not found out	24	2.47%
Total	971	

In year 2021 was 971 people by ethnicity 947 as Slovak, 24 as Not found out, 1 as Czech, 1 as Ukrainian, 1 as Rusyn, 1 as Russian and 1 as Polish.

Note on population: The difference values of population numbers in the table "Population statistic" and in the sections "Ethnicity" & "Religion" is caused by the use of various statistical methods.

=== Religion ===
Census 2021 (1+ %)
Religion	Number	Fraction
Roman Catholic Church	875	90.11%
None	51	5.25%
Not found out	22	2.27%
Total	971	

In year 2021 was 971 people by religion 875 from Roman Catholic Church, 51 from None, 22 from Not found out, 5 from Christian Congregations in Slovakia, 4 from Ad hoc movements, 3 from Other, 3 from Greek Catholic Church, 3 from Evangelical Church, 2 from Calvinist Church, 2 from Other and not ascertained christian church and 1 from Eastern Orthodox Church.
