= Snežnica =

Municipality of Slovakia

- Municipality
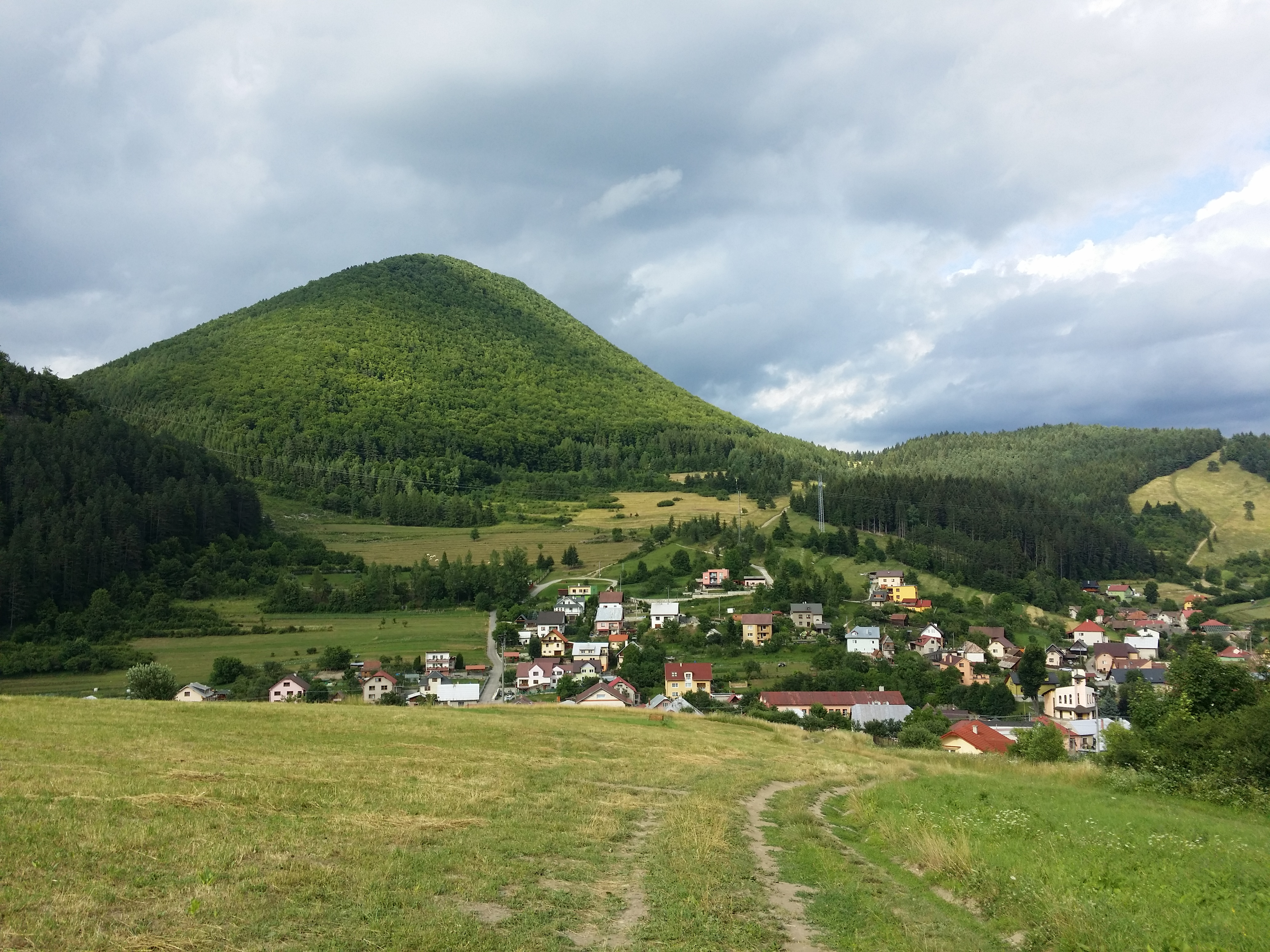

- Flag

- Location of Snežnica in the Žilina Region Location of Snežnica in Slovakia
- Coordinates: 49.27°N 18.78°E
- Country: Slovakia
- Region: Žilina Region
- District: Kysucké Nové Mesto District
- First mentioned: 1426

Area
  - Total: 5.51 km^{2} (2.13 sq mi)
- Elevation: 398 m (1,306 ft)

Population (2025)
  - Total: 1,137
- Time zone: UTC+1 (CET)
  - Summer (DST): UTC+2 (CEST)
- Postal code: 233 2
- Area code: +421 41
- Vehicle registration plate (until 2022): KM
- Website: www.obec-sneznica.sk/sk/

Snežnica (Hungarian: Havas) is a village and municipality in Kysucké Nové Mesto District in the Žilina Region of northern Slovakia.

== History ==
In historical records the village was first mentioned in 1426.

== Geography ==
The municipality lies at an altitude of 398 metres (1,306 ft) and covers an area of 5.51 km^{2} (2.13 sq mi) (2025).

== Population ==
Population statistic (10 years)
Year	1995	2005	2015	2025
Count	880	997	980	1137
Difference		+13.29%	−1.70%	+16.02%

Population statistic
Year	2024	2025
Count	1129	1137
Difference		+0.70%

It has a population of 1137 people (31 December 2025).

=== Ethnicity ===
Census 2021 (1+ %)
Ethnicity	Number	Fraction
Slovak	1058	97.51%
Not found out	20	1.84%
Czech	11	1.01%
Total	1085	

In year 2021 was 1085 people by ethnicity 1058 as Slovak, 20 as Not found out, 11 as Czech, 5 as Other, 2 as Russian, 1 as Ukrainian and 1 as Hungarian.

Note on population: The difference values of population numbers in the table "Population statistic" and in the sections "Ethnicity" & "Religion" is caused by the use of various statistical methods.

=== Religion ===
Census 2021 (1+ %)
Religion	Number	Fraction
Roman Catholic Church	906	83.5%
None	126	11.61%
Not found out	21	1.94%
Total	1085	

In year 2021 was 1085 people by religion 906 from Roman Catholic Church, 126 from None, 21 from Not found out, 8 from Christian Congregations in Slovakia, 7 from Evangelical Church, 5 from Ad hoc movements, 3 from Jehovah's Witnesses, 3 from Greek Catholic Church, 2 from Islam, 2 from Other, 1 from Eastern Orthodox Church and 1 from Buddhism.
