= Dolný Vadičov =

Village and municipality in Kysucké Nové Mesto District in Slovakia

- Municipality
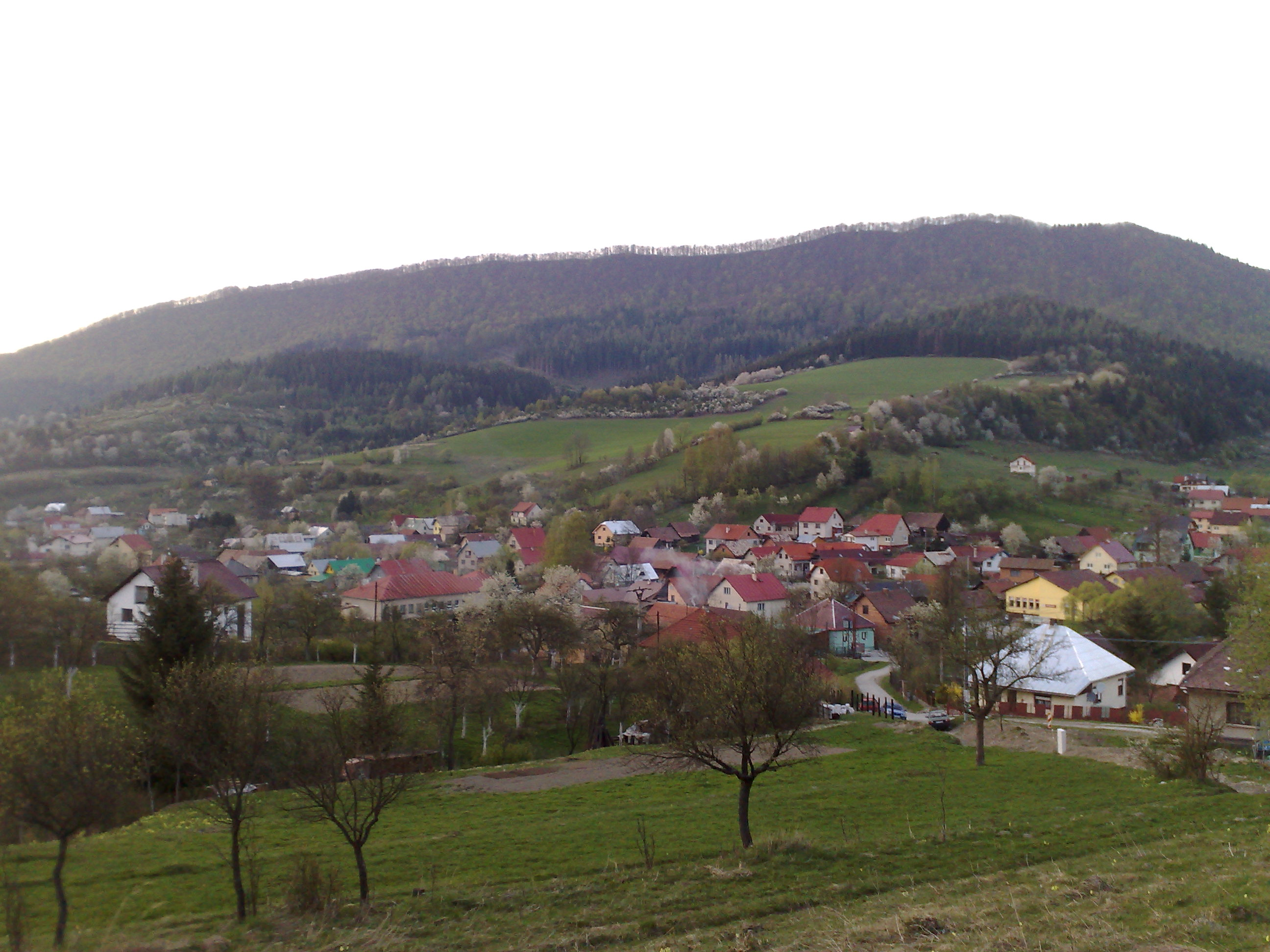

- Flag

- Location of Dolný Vadičov in the Žilina Region Location of Dolný Vadičov in Slovakia
- Coordinates: 49.27°N 18.85°E
- Country: Slovakia
- Region: Žilina Region
- District: Kysucké Nové Mesto District
- First mentioned: 1419

Area
  - Total: 5.95 km^{2} (2.30 sq mi)
- Elevation: 442 m (1,450 ft)

Population (2025)
  - Total: 594
- Time zone: UTC+1 (CET)
  - Summer (DST): UTC+2 (CEST)
- Postal code: 234 5
- Area code: +421 41
- Vehicle registration plate (until 2022): KM
- Website: www.dolnyvadicov.sk

Dolný Vadičov (Hungarian: Alsóvadas) is a village and municipality in Kysucké Nové Mesto District in the Zilina Region of northern Slovakia. It has a population of about 500 people.

== History ==
In historical records the village was first mentioned in 1419.

== Geography ==
The municipality lies at an altitude of 442 metres (1,450 ft) and covers an area of 5.95 km^{2} (2.30 sq mi) (2025).

== See also ==
- List of municipalities and towns in Slovakia

== Population ==
Population statistic (10 years)
| Year | 1995 | 2005 | 2015 | 2025 |
|---|---|---|---|---|
| Count | 402 | 423 | 486 | 594 |
| Difference | | +5.22% | +14.89% | +22.22% |

Population statistic
| Year | 2024 | 2025 |
|---|---|---|
| Count | 598 | 594 |
| Difference | | −0.66% |

It has a population of 594 people (31 December 2025).

=== Ethnicity ===
Census 2021 (1+ %)
| Ethnicity | Number | Fraction |
|---|---|---|
| Slovak | 504 | 98.24% |
| Not found out | 9 | 1.75% |
| Total | 513 | |

In year 2021 was 513 people by ethnicity 504 as Slovak, 9 as Not found out, 3 as Czech, 1 as Jewish, 1 as Rusyn and 1 as Austrian.

Note on population: The difference values of population numbers in the table "Population statistic" and in the sections "Ethnicity" & "Religion" is caused by the use of various statistical methods.

=== Religion ===
Census 2021 (1+ %)
| Religion | Number | Fraction |
|---|---|---|
| Roman Catholic Church | 424 | 82.65% |
| None | 68 | 13.26% |
| Not found out | 9 | 1.75% |
| Greek Catholic Church | 6 | 1.17% |
| Total | 513 | |

In year 2021 was 513 people by religion 424 from Roman Catholic Church, 68 from None, 9 from Not found out, 6 from Greek Catholic Church, 2 from Evangelical Church, 1 from Calvinist Church, 1 from Paganism and natural spirituality, 1 from Christian Congregations in Slovakia and 1 from Other.

== Genealogical resources ==
The records for genealogical research are available at the state archive "Statny Archiv in Bytca, Slovakia"

- Roman Catholic church records (births/marriages/deaths): 1666-1900 (parish B)
