= Povina =

- Municipality
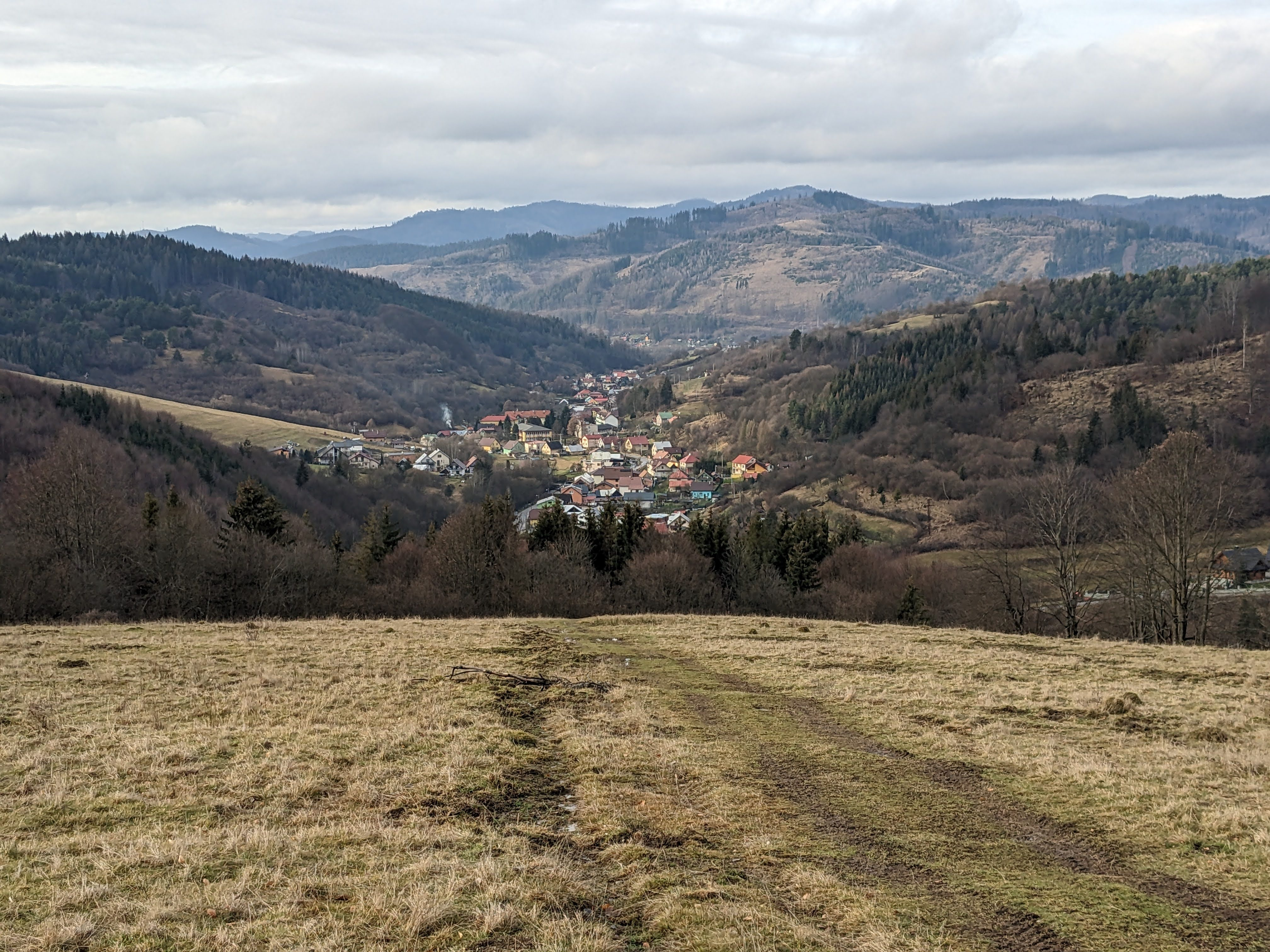

- Flag

- Location of Povina in the Žilina Region Location of Povina in Slovakia
- Coordinates: 49.32°N 18.82°E
- Country: Slovakia
- Region: Žilina Region
- District: Kysucké Nové Mesto District
- First mentioned: 1438

Area
  - Total: 19.12 km^{2} (7.38 sq mi)
- Elevation: 367 m (1,204 ft)

Population (2025)
  - Total: 1,130
- Time zone: UTC+1 (CET)
  - Summer (DST): UTC+2 (CEST)
- Postal code: 233 3
- Area code: +421 41
- Vehicle registration plate (until 2022): KM
- Website: obec-povina.sk

Povina (Hungarian: Gerebes) is a village and municipality in Kysucké Nové Mesto District in the Zilina Region of northern Slovakia.

== History ==
In historical records the village was first mentioned in 1438.

== Geography ==
The municipality lies at an altitude of 367 metres (1,204 ft) and covers an area of 19.12 km^{2} (7.38 sq mi) (2025).

== Population ==
Population statistic (10 years)
Year	1995	2005	2015	2025
Count	1113	1128	1141	1130
Difference		+1.34%	+1.15%	−0.96%

Population statistic
Year	2024	2025
Count	1149	1130
Difference		−1.65%

It has a population of 1130 people (31 December 2025).

=== Ethnicity ===
Census 2021 (1+ %)
Ethnicity	Number	Fraction
Slovak	1100	96.66%
Not found out	32	2.81%
Total	1138	

In year 2021 was 1138 people by ethnicity 1100 as Slovak, 32 as Not found out, 8 as Czech, 3 as Russian, 2 as Italian, 1 as Ukrainian, 1 as Austrian, 1 as German and 1 as Other.

Note on population: The difference values of population numbers in the table "Population statistic" and in the sections "Ethnicity" & "Religion" is caused by the use of various statistical methods.

=== Religion ===
Census 2021 (1+ %)
Religion	Number	Fraction
Roman Catholic Church	949	83.39%
None	115	10.11%
Not found out	47	4.13%
Total	1138	

In year 2021 was 1138 people by religion 949 from Roman Catholic Church, 115 from None, 47 from Not found out, 7 from Christian Congregations in Slovakia, 7 from Greek Catholic Church, 4 from Evangelical Church, 3 from Eastern Orthodox Church, 2 from Other, 1 from Calvinist Church, 1 from Church of the Brethren, 1 from Apostolic Church and 1 from Ad hoc movements.
