= Horný Vadičov =

Village in Slovakia

- Municipality
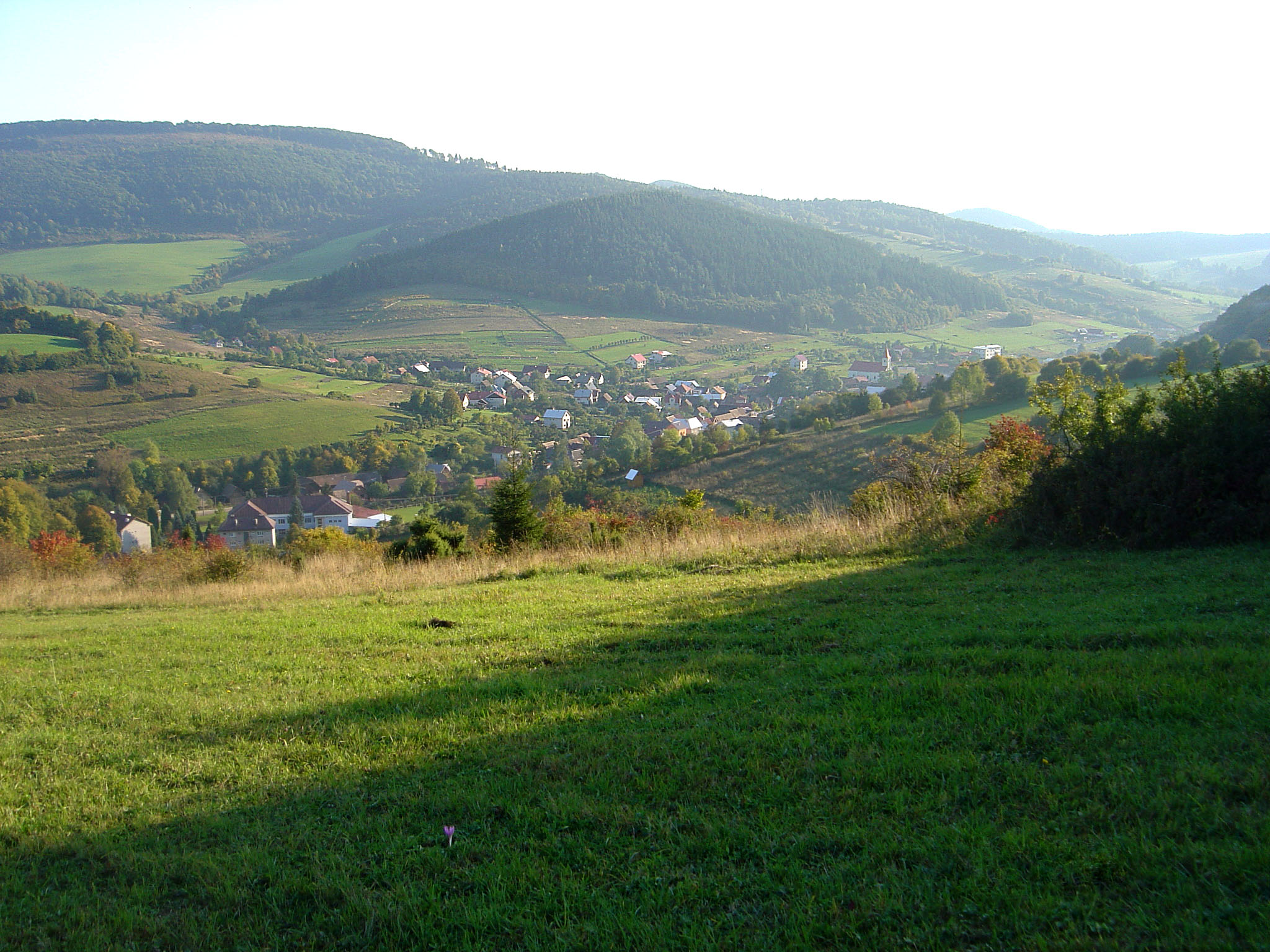
- View of the village from Ľadonhora

- Flag

- Location of Horný Vadičov in the Žilina Region Location of Horný Vadičov in Slovakia
- Coordinates: 49.27°N 18.88°E
- Country: Slovakia
- Region: Žilina Region
- District: Kysucké Nové Mesto District
- First mentioned: 1385

Government
  - Mayor: Viera Lea Slivková

Area
  - Total: 20.81 km^{2} (8.03 sq mi)
- Elevation: 487 m (1,598 ft)

Population (2025)
  - Total: 1,729
- Time zone: UTC+1 (CET)
  - Summer (DST): UTC+2 (CEST)
- Postal code: 234 5
- Area code: +421 41
- Vehicle registration plate (until 2022): KM
- Website: www.hornyvadicov.sk

Horný Vadičov (Hungarian: Felsővadas) is a village and municipality in the Kysucké Nové Mesto District in the Žilina Region of northern Slovakia.

== History ==
Due to the village's ancient history, it is difficult to determine exactly when modern Horný Vadičov was established. The village was most likely founded at the end of the 14th century, denoted by a mention to the area in writing in 1385 as Silva Vaditzov. Other written mentions of the name of the village are from 1419 as Vadycho, 1504 as Felse Wadychov, 1773 as Horní Wadičow, and the Hungarian names Felsövadisco and Felsövadas. It was first mentioned in writing as an independent municipality under the name Felse Wadychov in 1504.

=== Early history ===
Human settlement in today's Horný Vadičov began in the early Bronze Age, denoted by a dated bronze ax found in the village which is now preserved in the collection of the Považský Museum in Žilina. The village at that time was populated by the Lusatian people, denoted by multiple sites discovered proving their existence here. The Lusatian descendants would remain in the area until Roman times, when the area in the Slovak mountains would become more densely populated with other groups of people. Unfortunately due to ignorance, most sets of bronze objects from the Lusatian people have deteriorated or were preserved properly.

In this time, agriculture would become the major economic focus of the village, which paved way for large amounts of slash and burning of the forest around the village, where the new soil would be prepared for sowing.

In the Second Iron Age, the Celtic people settled in southwestern Slovakia, whose culture would eventually spread to the village and northern Slovakia as a whole and evolve into the Púchov culture in the Roman times. During this period, many wooden buildings were erected on the hills and a basic outline of the village was established. According to Latin records, the village in this time period was a "peasant" place to live.

=== Medieval history ===
Beginning after the 12th century, the Vadičov valley, where the village is located today, belonged to the royal estates of Starhrad (Varín Castle). Records of property ownership first come in the mid 14th, when land was cut from the Varín (Starhrad) castle estate. In a document from 1359, Louis I of Hungary donated the land to Komes Konch of Rudina and his relatives. Part of the Vadičov forest "ad silva Waditzov…" was acquired in 1384 by Peter, Ladislav, and John (Ján), sons of John (Ján) of Nededze. The land is later given to a man named Sandzivoj, who since 1397 was the owner of the Strečno Castle by King Sigismund.

King Sigismund later returns the land to one of the original owners from 1359, John, and his son Mikuláš and his relatives in 1419. The document from this year also mentions the return of the small property "il villula Vadychov…", which was established by Sandzivoj in 1385. After this time, increased settlement in the area of the Vadičov valley takes place. Documents specifically detailing the land of today's Horný Vadičov begin in 1494 when a transfer of ownership of the village, referred to as "Villa Vadycho", from Mikuláš to his now of–age son Martin takes place.

Horný Vadičov is regarded as an independent settlement for the first time in 1504, when parts of Vadičov valley land owned by several branches of the original owners, including land owned by Mikuláš and Martin, become the subject of a sale or deposit. Together with a man named Tomáš Záborský, who owned certain parts of the Vadič estate himself, sold their entire share of the land of the Vadič estate to a man named Mark Horváth in Strečno. In the first decades of the 16th century, other Horváth family members acquired part of the Vadič estate, including today's Horný Vadičov. This is where the name of the village first appears in one of these Horváth family sales in 1504, this time with the name of "Felsowadiczow" (Upper Vadičov). The village was later sold to the Nedecký family and their relatives, who would remain in control of the village until the end of feudalism, when the village becomes more or less independent.

=== Modern history ===
The originally independent neighboring agricultural settlement of Prostredný Vadičov is annexed by Horný Vadičov in 1913.

During the COVID-19 pandemic, the COVID-19 vaccine becomes available to the elderly and those with a weak immune system in the village on 20 April 2021.

In response to the 2022 Russian invasion of Ukraine, Slovakia as a nation, including Horný Vadičov, welcomes the arrival of Ukrainian refugees from war. This was announced on the village's website on 3 March 2022.

== Geography ==
The village is located below the southern slopes of the Kysucká vrchovina valley, stretching the end of the village into a Y-shape. The municipality lies at an altitude of 487 metres (1,598 ft) and covers an area of 20.81 km^{2} (8.03 sq mi) (2025).

== Population ==
Population statistic (10 years)
Year	1995	2005	2015	2025
Count	1499	1569	1630	1729
Difference		+4.66%	+3.88%	+6.07%

Population statistic
Year	2024	2025
Count	1723	1729
Difference		+0.34%

It has a population of 1729 people (31 December 2025).

=== Ethnicity ===
Census 2021 (1+ %)
Ethnicity	Number	Fraction
Slovak	1628	96.96%
Not found out	54	3.21%
Total	1679	

In year 2021 was 1679 people by ethnicity 1628 as Slovak, 54 as Not found out, 6 as Czech, 4 as Polish, 1 as Italian, 1 as Romani, 1 as Russian, 1 as Hungarian, 1 as Other, 1 as Greek and 1 as English.

Note on population: The difference values of population numbers in the table "Population statistic" and in the sections "Ethnicity" & "Religion" is caused by the use of various statistical methods.

=== Religion ===
Census 2021 (1+ %)
Religion	Number	Fraction
Roman Catholic Church	1485	88.45%
None	116	6.91%
Not found out	43	2.56%
Total	1679	

In year 2021 was 1679 people by religion 1485 from Roman Catholic Church, 116 from None, 43 from Not found out, 11 from Christian Congregations in Slovakia, 7 from Calvinist Church, 6 from Greek Catholic Church, 4 from Evangelical Church, 3 from Other, 2 from Other and not ascertained christian church, 1 from Apostolic Church and 1 from Ad hoc movements.

== Education ==
The first mention of the establishment of a school for the children of Horný Vadičov was in 1789. During the Age of Enlightenment, King Joseph II made it a goal of his to make a school for children ages 6–12 compulsory, as well as ordering an annual census of children, declared teaching free and punishing the absence of students. The school, based in a wooden church under pastor Cyprián Slandr, was founded in 1789. It is no longer possible to find out exactly who were the first teachers in the village, it is only known that a farmer and the organist Matejovič of Bošác taught. Today, the elementary school teaches students from 2 to 6 years of age.

== Government and politics ==
Horný Vadičov is a municipality whose representative of the village on a national level and highest executive body is the mayor, who has legislative authority in the town, along with the General Assembly and Chief Inspector. Since the year 1827, there have been 35 mayors of the village, with the current residing mayor as of 2022 being Mr. Miroslav Káčerik. The longest-serving mayor of the village was Ján Berešík, who served for 25 years from 1879 to 1904, and the shortest serving mayor was Filip Krišica who served for only 12 hours in 1958. The mayor's term of office ends with the promise of the newly elected mayor, with the method of electing the mayor regulated by special law. The mayor of the village has the power to 1) convene and conduct council meetings and sign their resolutions, 2) perform municipal administration, 3) represent the municipality on a national level, 4) decide on all matters the municipal administration does not, 5) preserve the flag of the municipality and the seal of the municipality, 6) sign binding regulations of the municipality, and 7) suspend the execution of resolutions of the municipal council for up to 10 days if they consider the law contradicts another law or is an obvious disadvantage for the municipality.

== Tourism ==
Being a smaller village surrounded by mountains, Horný Vadičov has a high tourist appeal, especially in skiing in the winter. In 2022, Horný Vadičov's Snow Sun Skiing Resort was voted #1 Small Ski Area in the Kysucké Nové Mesto District, #1 Small Ski Area in Slovakia, and #1 Small Ski Area in Europe by On the Snow. The Horská chata is also a popular mountain home for tourists in the village. In the summer season, cycling and cycling tours through the mountains also have high tourist appeal for the lack of traffic in the area and beautiful natural and historic sites.

== Gallery ==
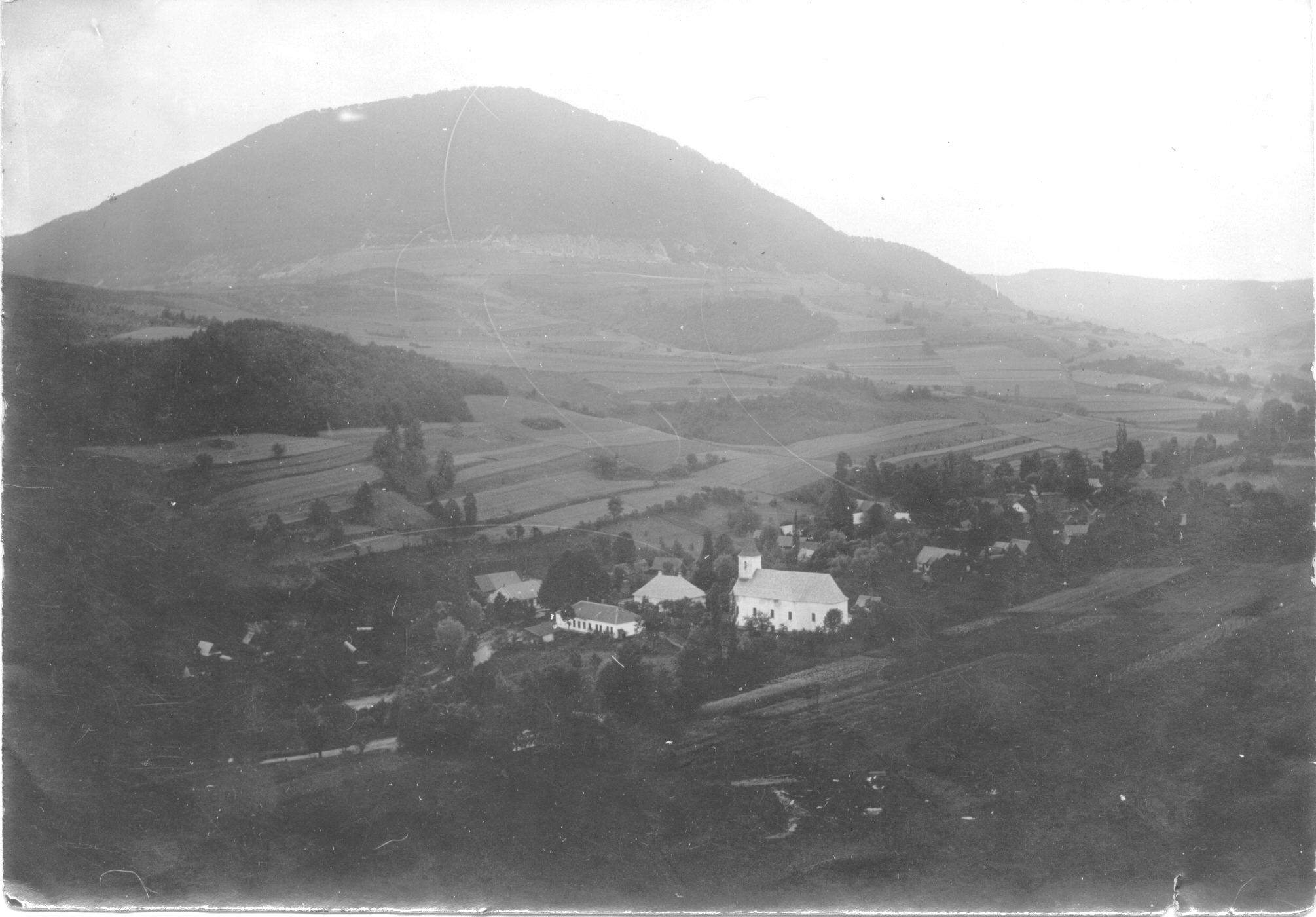
The village in 1935

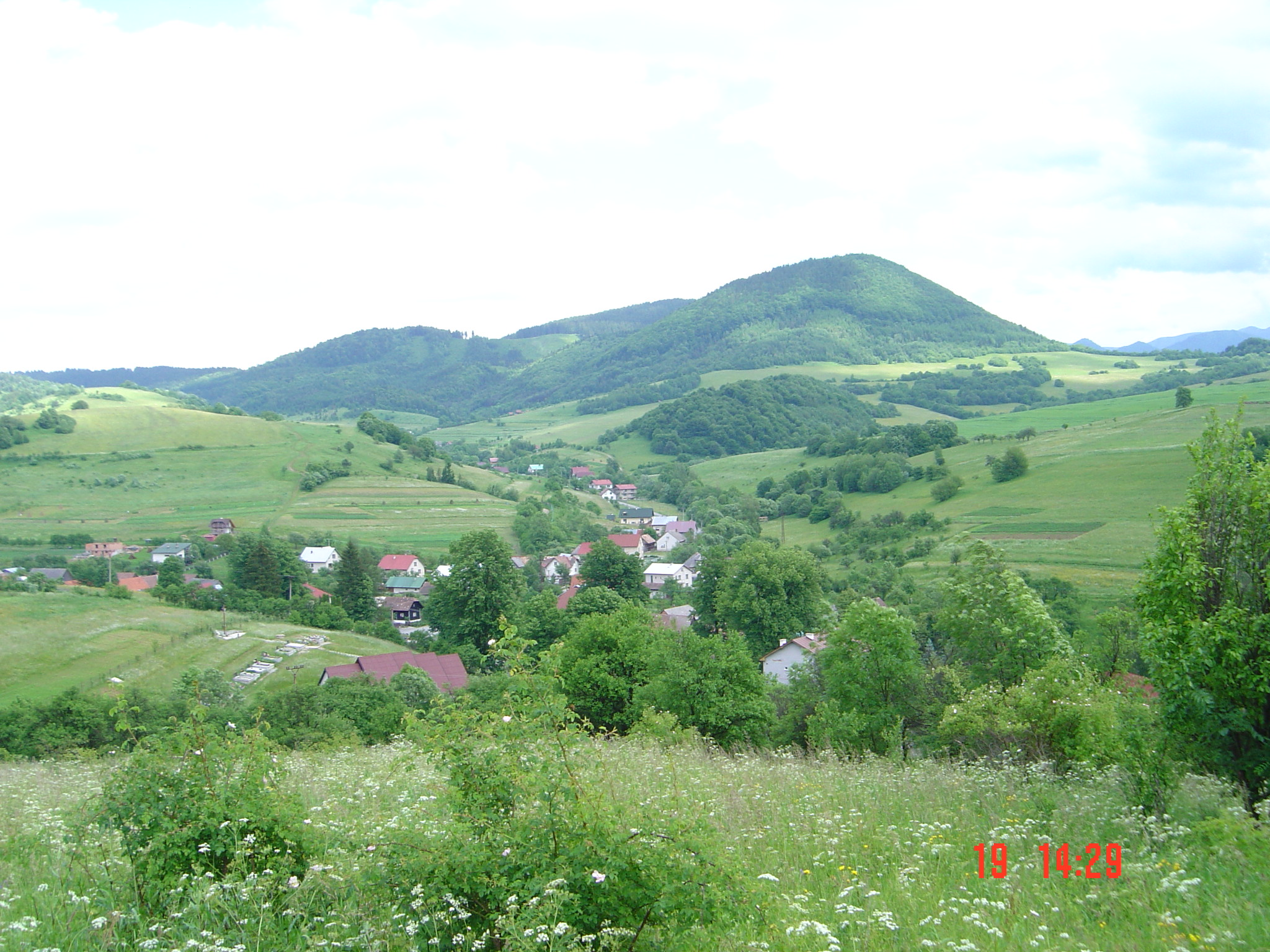
Long image of the village

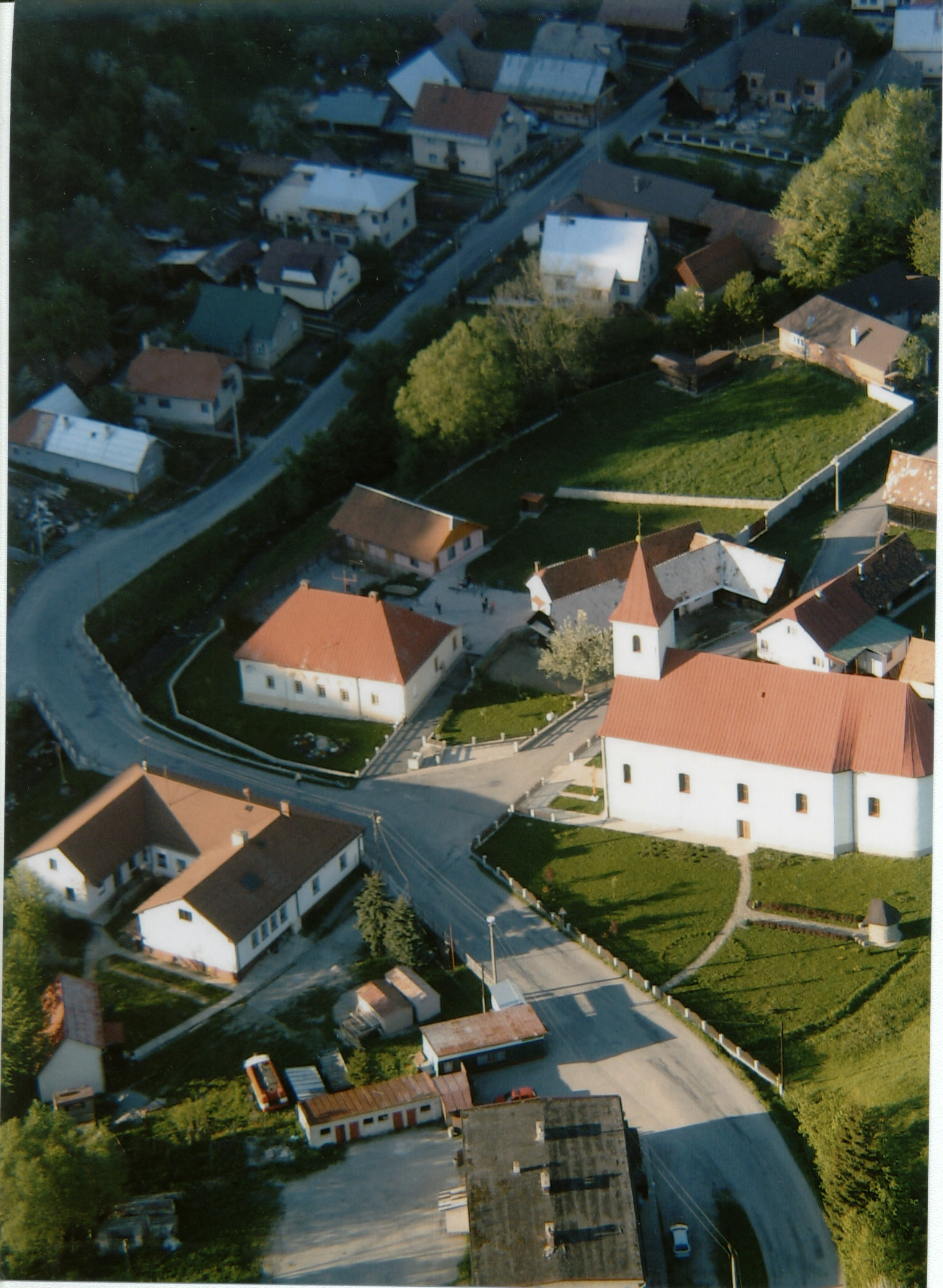
Church of St. Nicholas

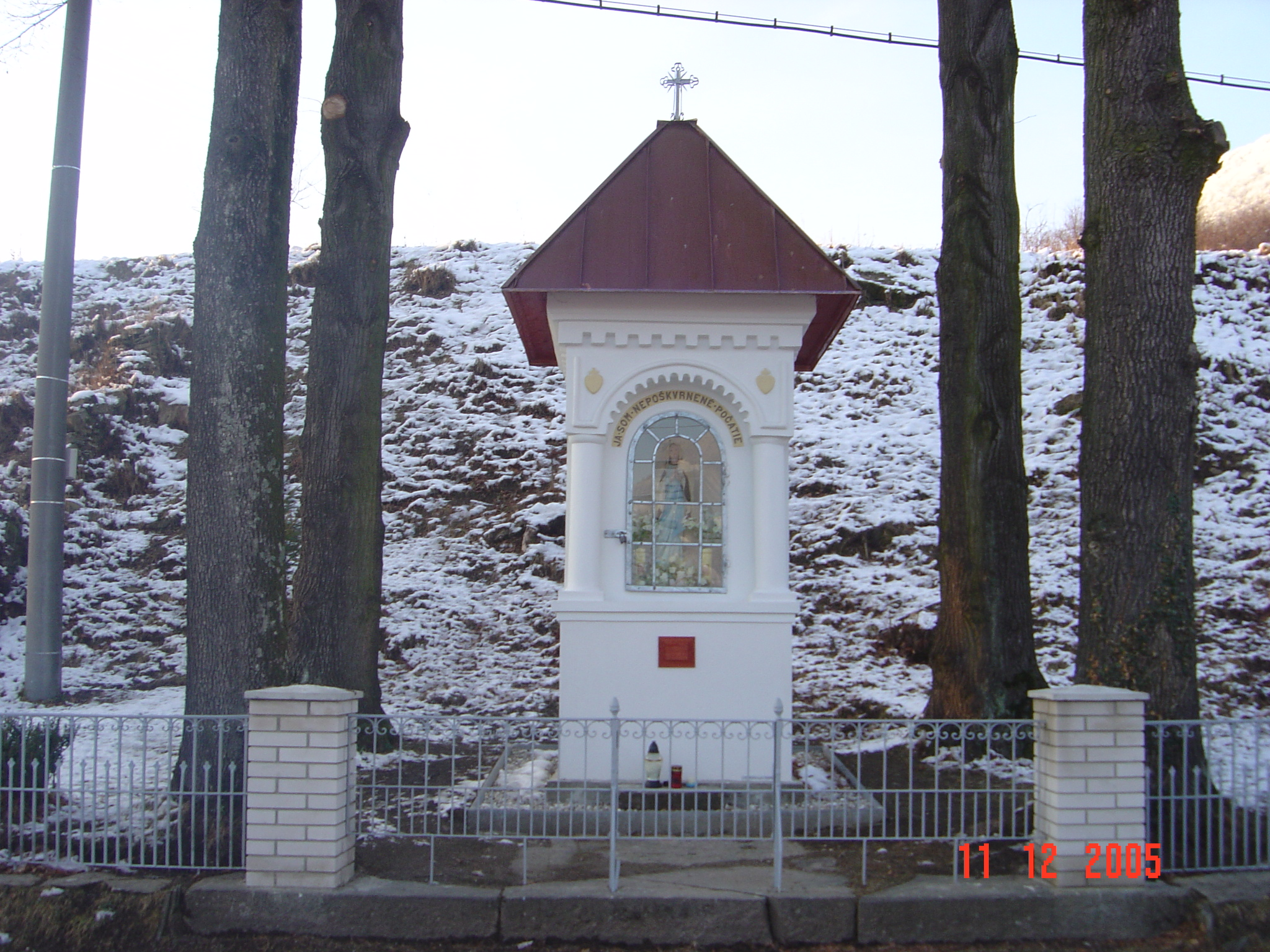
Chapel by the cemetery

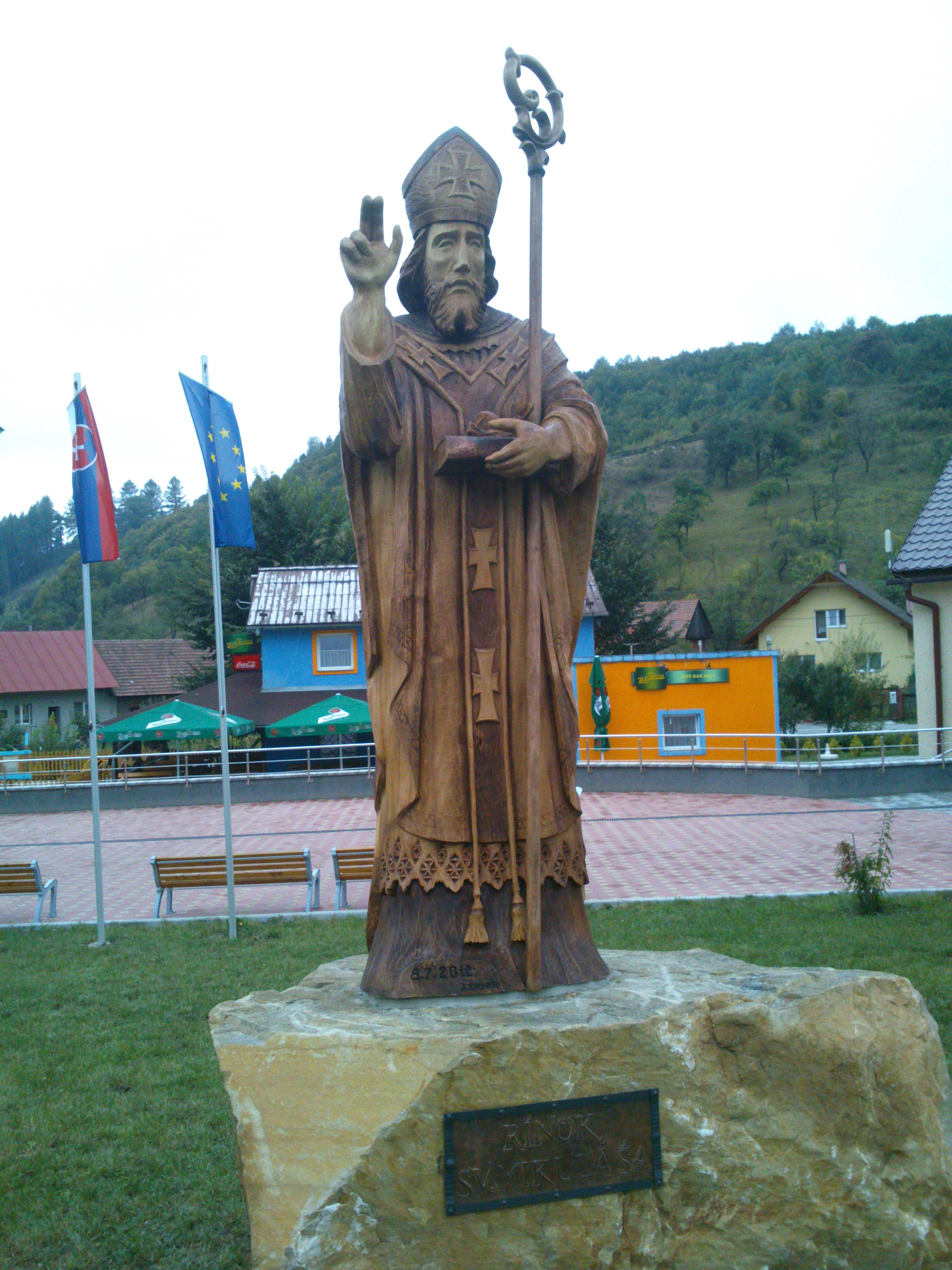
Village patron saint Nicholas statue

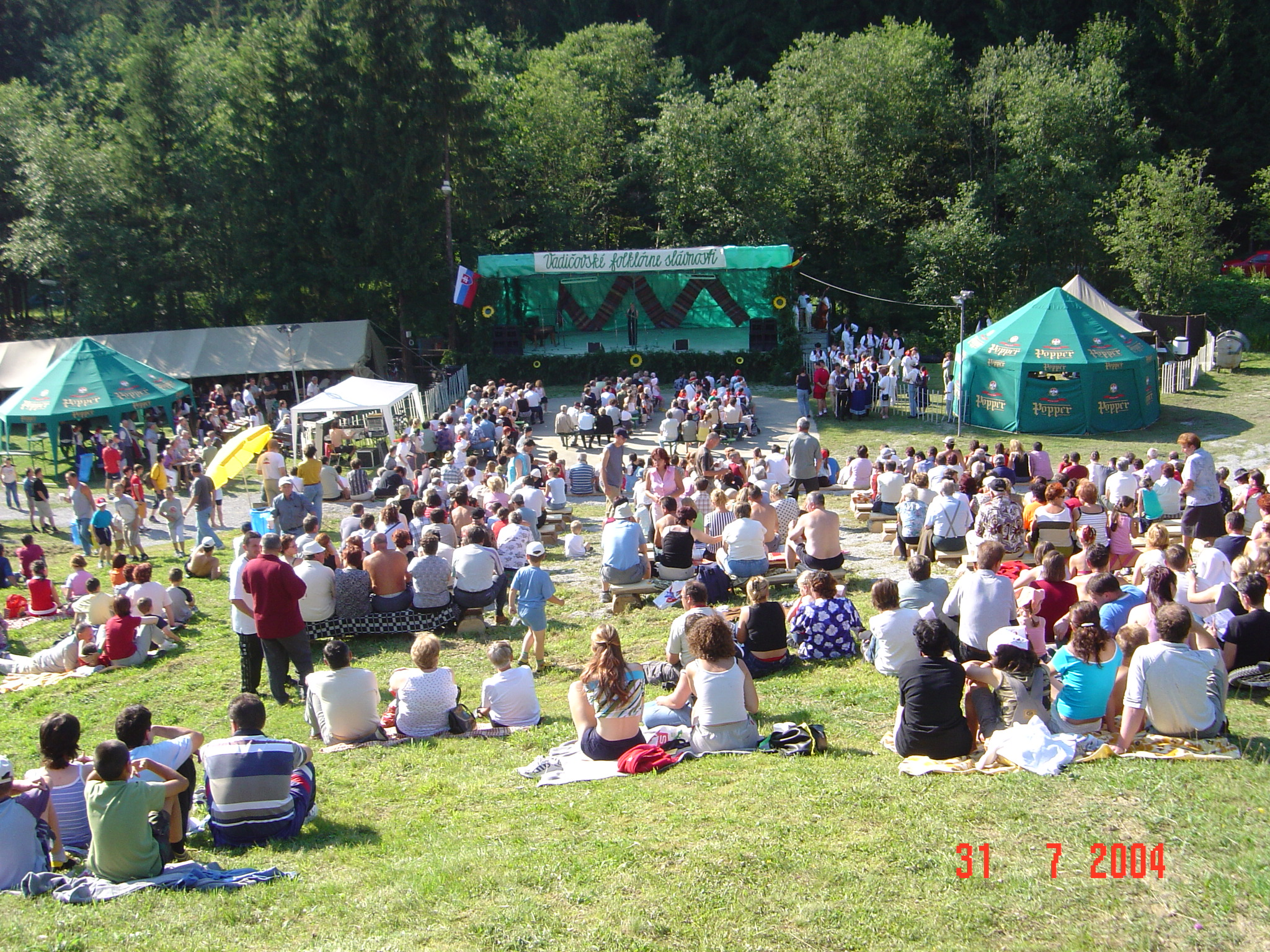
Amphitheater in Hájnice

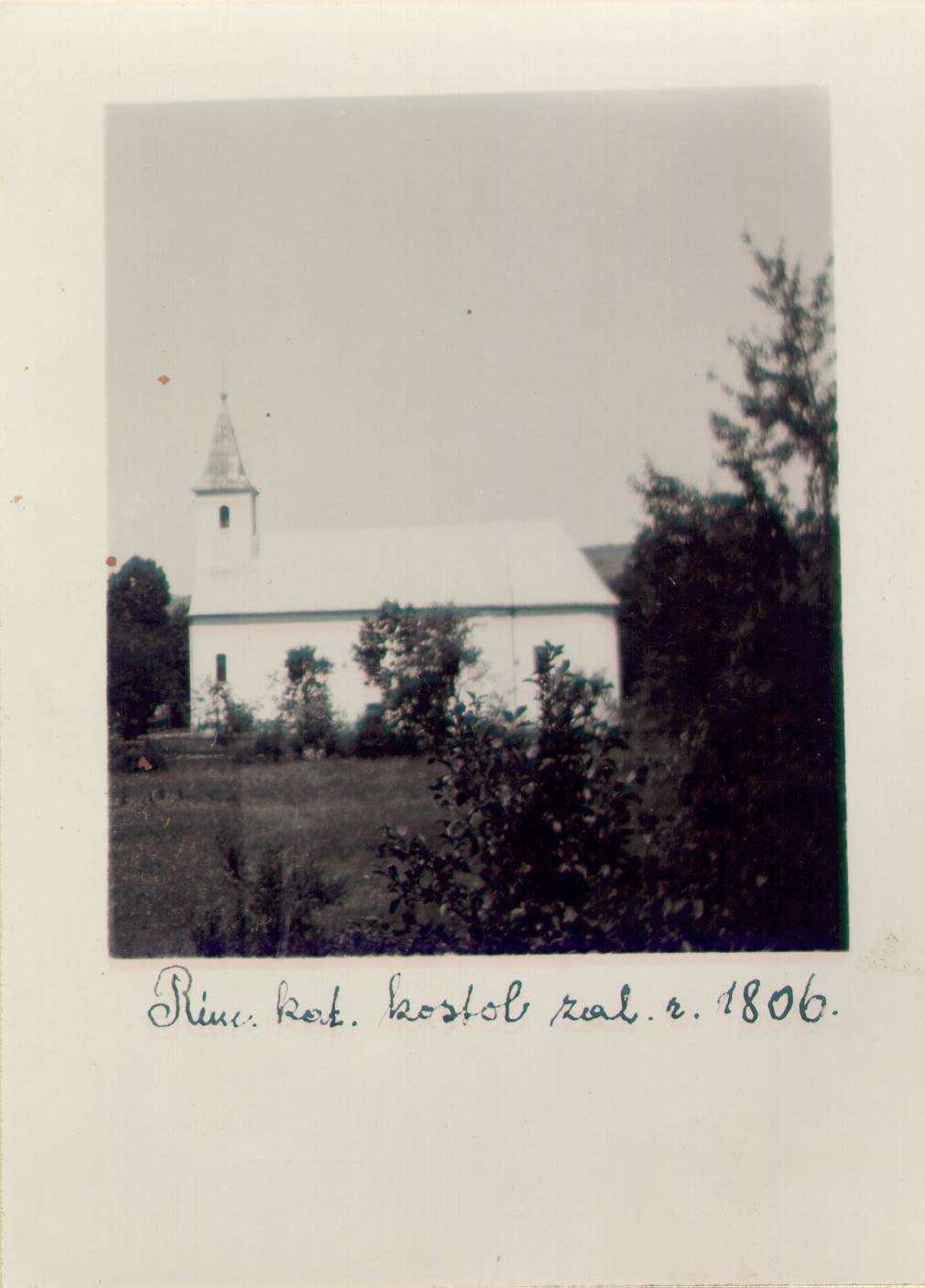
Church of St. Nicholas (historical photo)

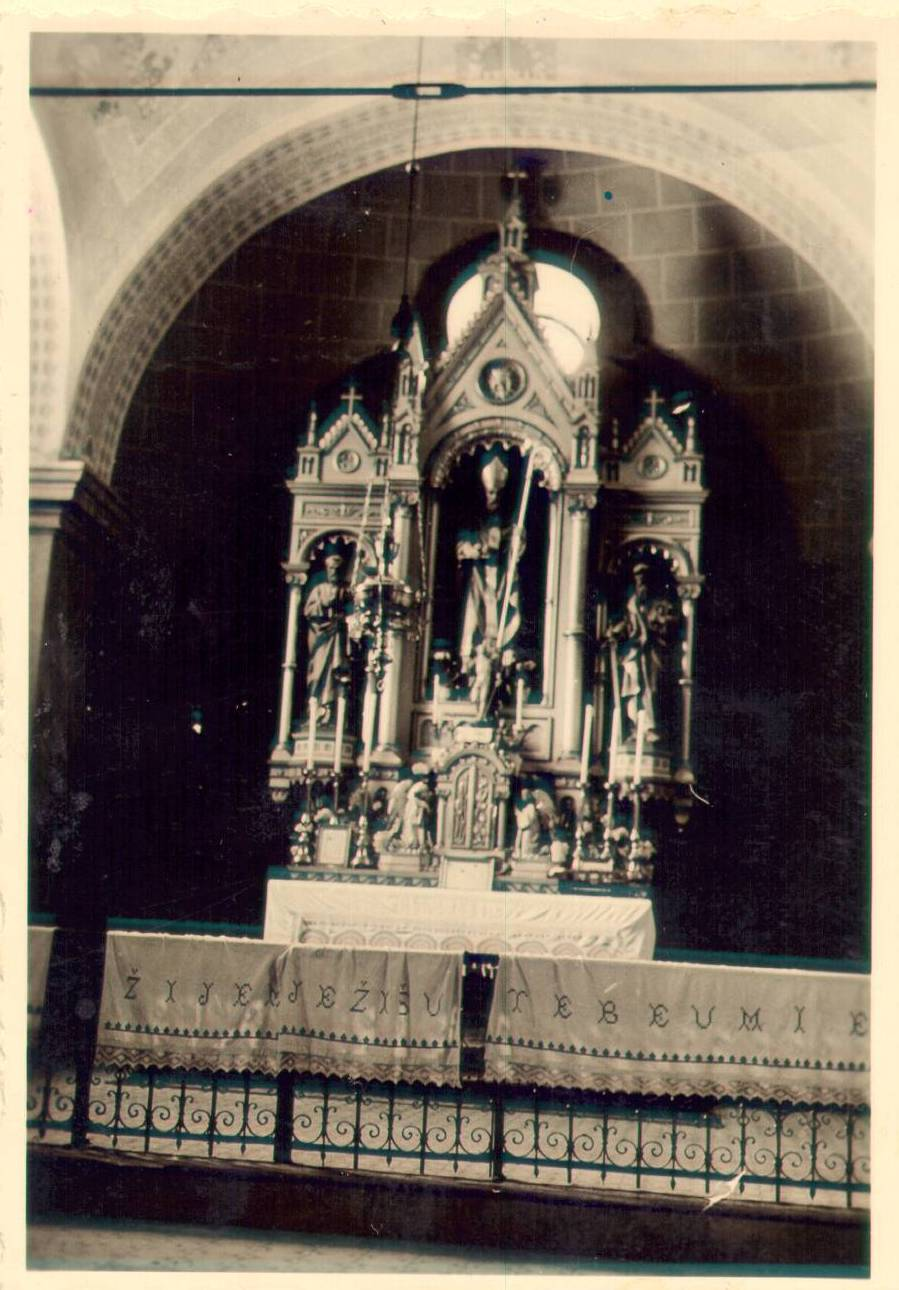
Church main altar (historical photo)

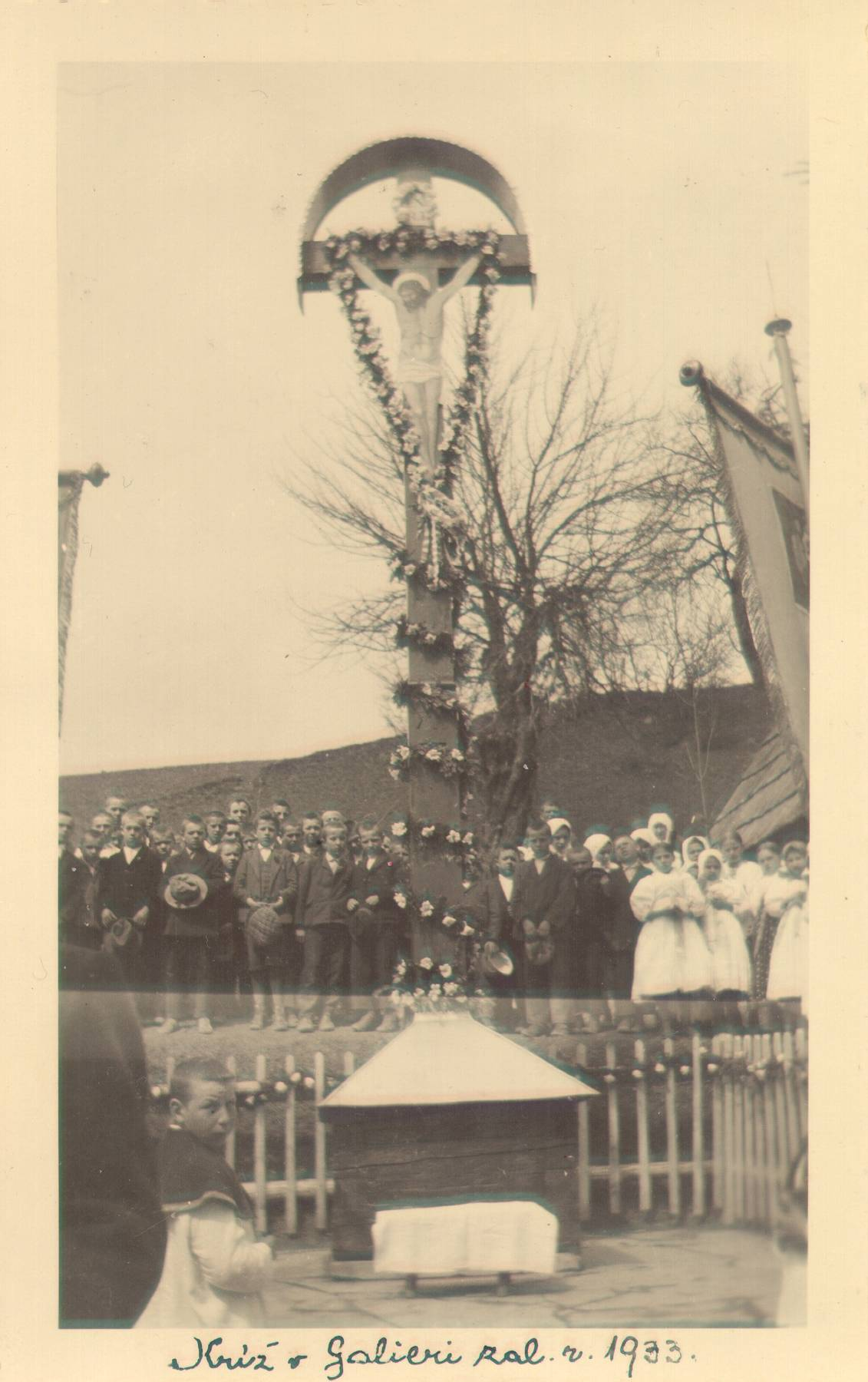
Cross built in 1933 (historical photo)

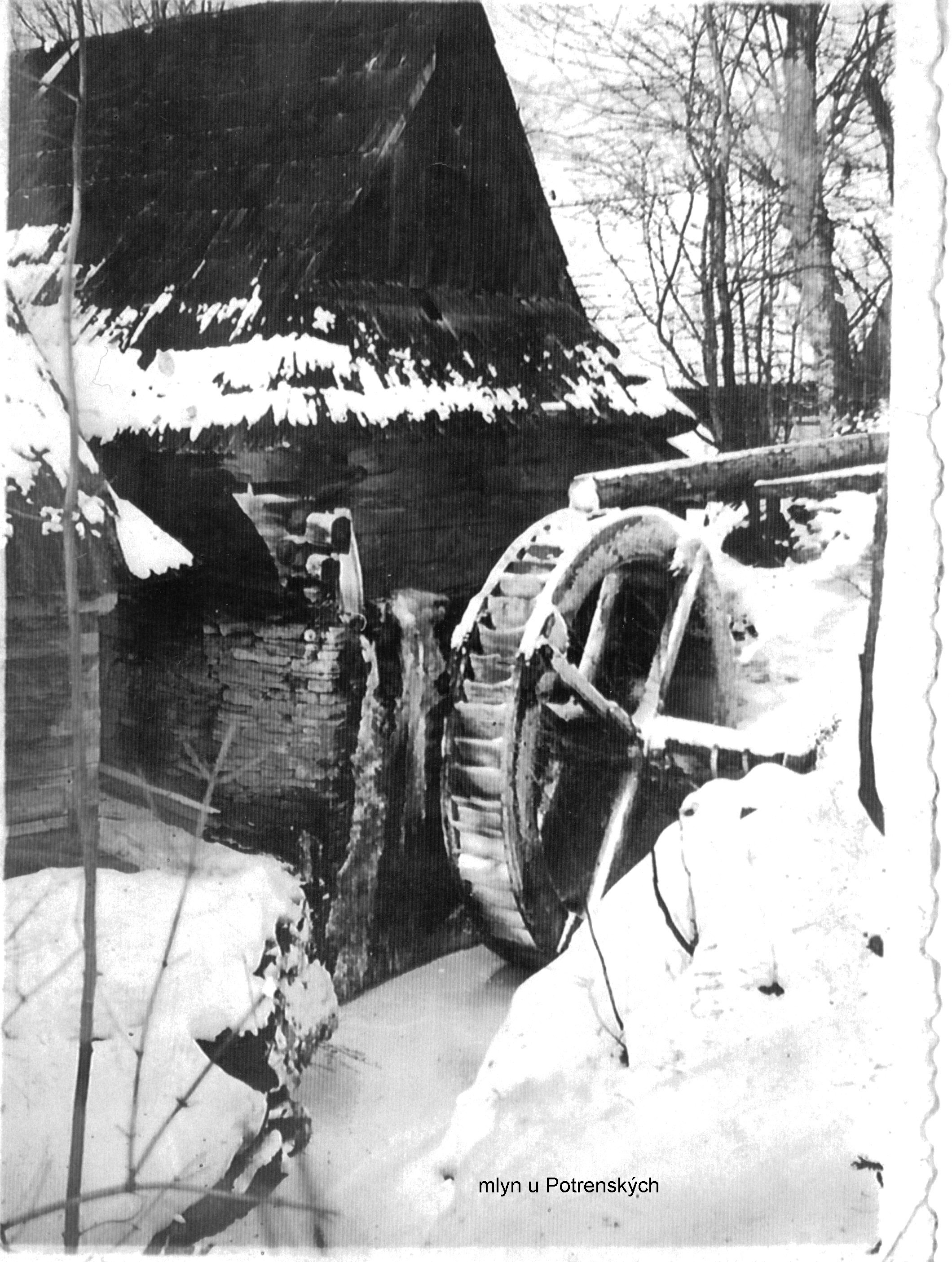
Mill in Potrenských (historical photo)

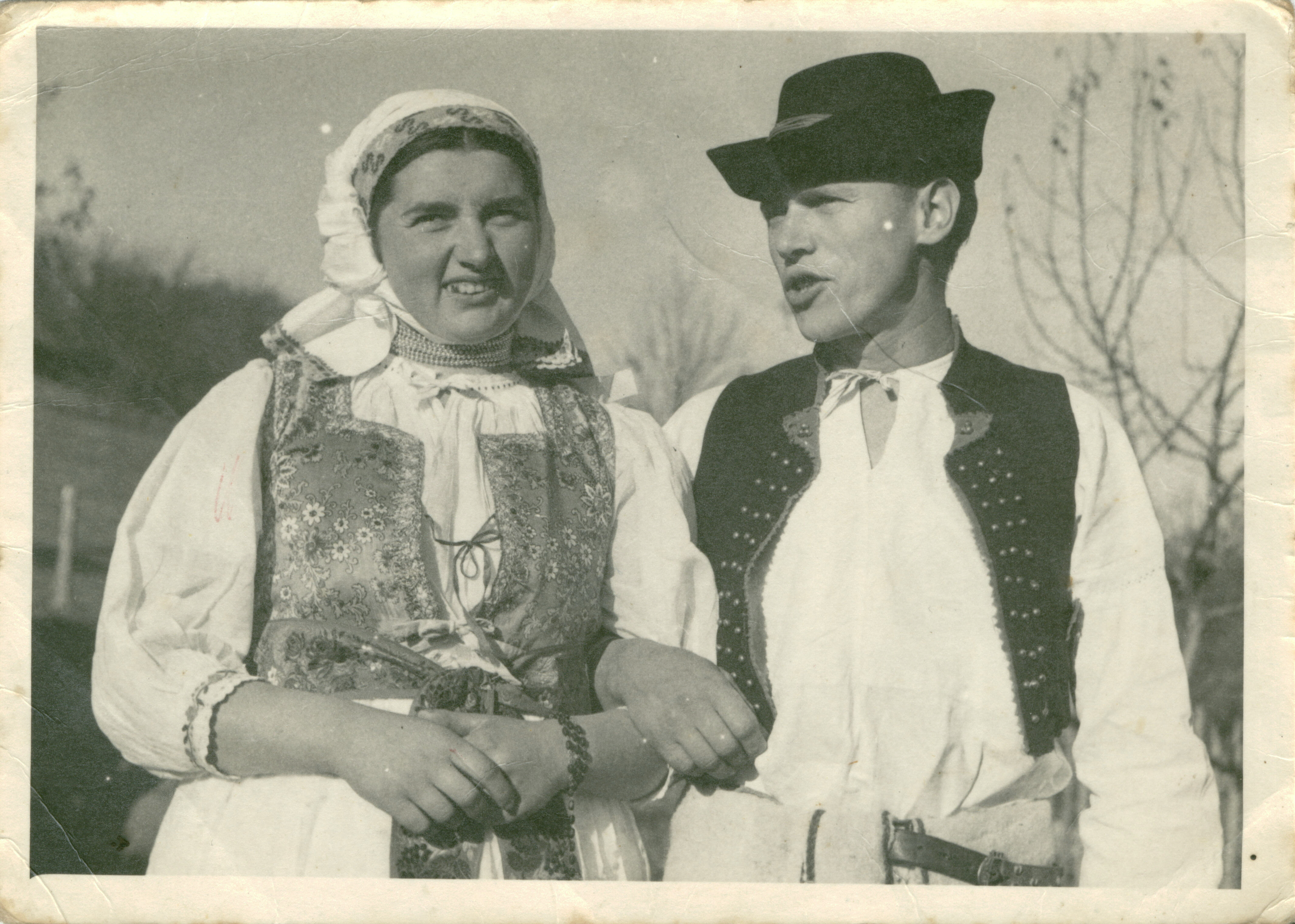
Costume from the village (historical photo)

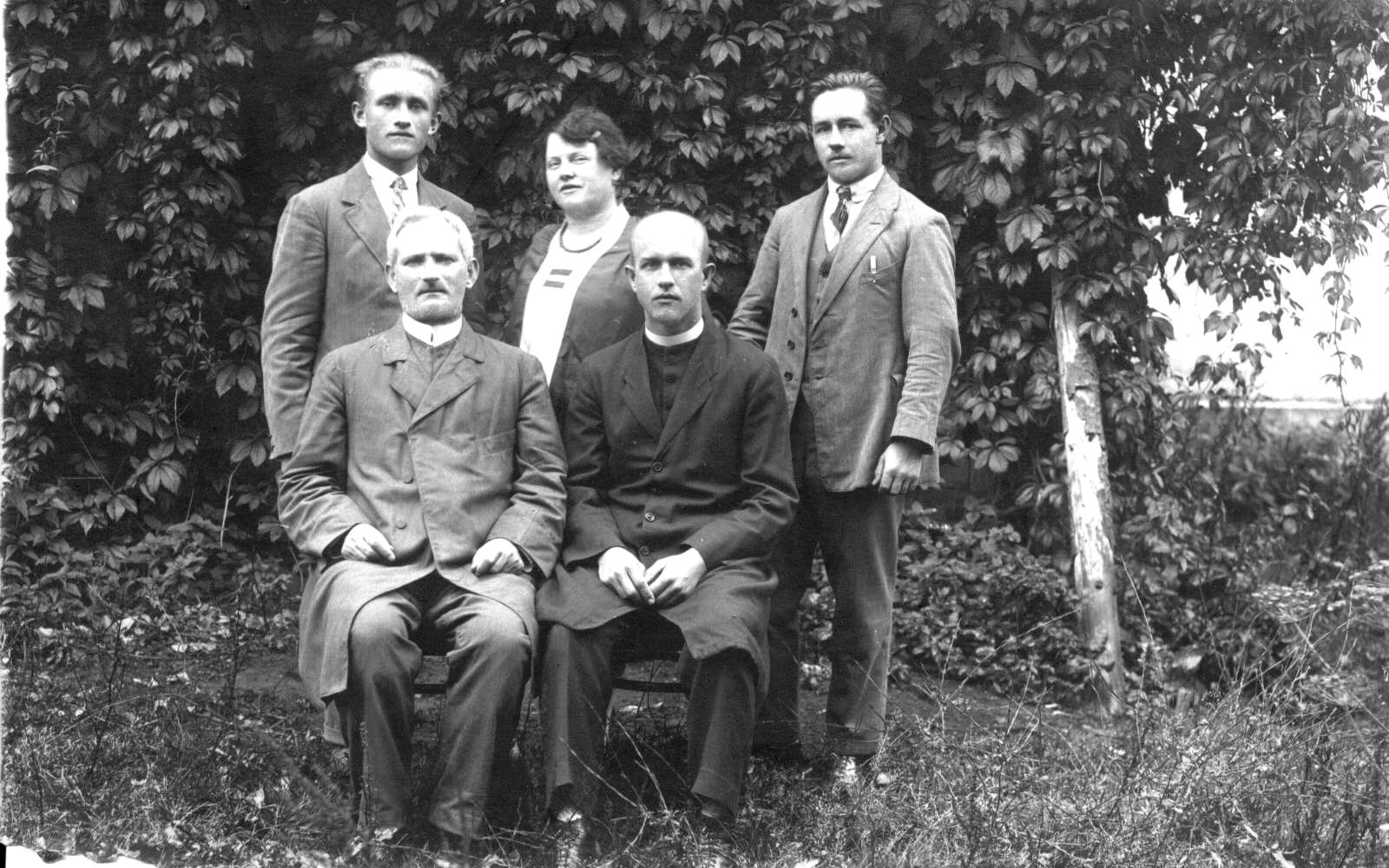
Poet Andrej Majer sitting left (historical photo)

== See also ==
- List of municipalities and towns in Slovakia

== Genealogical resources ==
The records for genealogical research are available at the state archive "Statny Archiv in Bytca, Slovakia"

- Roman Catholic church records (births/marriages/deaths): 1666-1900 (parish A)
