= Rudinka =

- Municipality
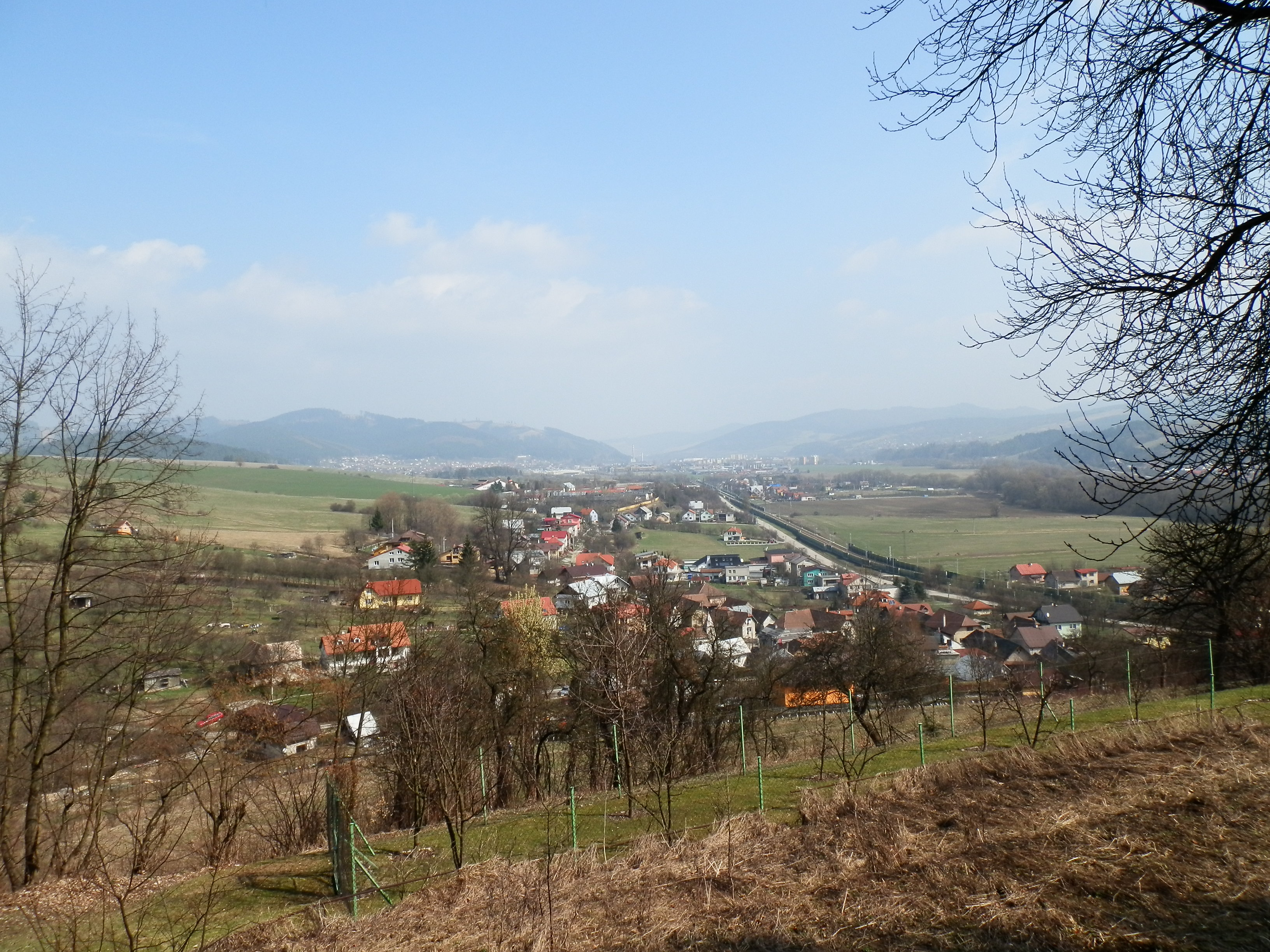

- Flag

- Location of Rudinka in the Žilina Region Location of Rudinka in Slovakia
- Coordinates: 49.27°N 18.75°E
- Country: Slovakia
- Region: Žilina Region
- District: Kysucké Nové Mesto District
- First mentioned: 1506

Area
  - Total: 3.13 km^{2} (1.21 sq mi)
- Elevation: 348 m (1,142 ft)

Population (2025)
  - Total: 419
- Time zone: UTC+1 (CET)
  - Summer (DST): UTC+2 (CEST)
- Postal code: 233 1
- Area code: +421 41
- Vehicle registration plate (until 2022): KM
- Website: www.rudinka.sk

Rudinka (Hungarian: Kisrudas) is a village and municipality in Kysucké Nové Mesto District in the Žilina Region of northern Slovakia.

== History ==
In historical records the village was first mentioned in 1506.

== Geography ==
The municipality lies at an altitude of 348 metres (1,142 ft) and covers an area of 3.13 km^{2} (1.21 sq mi) (2025).

== Population ==
Population statistic (10 years)
Year	1995	2005	2015	2025
Count	381	396	384	419
Difference		+3.93%	−3.03%	+9.11%

Population statistic
Year	2024	2025
Count	419	419
Difference		−1.42%

It has a population of 419 people (31 December 2025).

=== Ethnicity ===
Census 2021 (1+ %)
Ethnicity	Number	Fraction
Slovak	383	96.47%
Not found out	11	2.77%
Total	397	

In year 2021 was 397 people by ethnicity 383 as Slovak, 11 as Not found out, 2 as Other, 1 as Jewish, 1 as Czech and 1 as Vietnamese.

Note on population: The difference values of population numbers in the table "Population statistic" and in the sections "Ethnicity" & "Religion" is caused by the use of various statistical methods.

=== Religion ===
Census 2021 (1+ %)
Religion	Number	Fraction
Roman Catholic Church	283	71.28%
None	87	21.91%
Not found out	12	3.02%
Other and not ascertained christian church	6	1.51%
Total	397	

In year 2021 was 397 people by religion 283 from Roman Catholic Church, 87 from None, 12 from Not found out, 6 from Other and not ascertained christian church, 3 from Christian Congregations in Slovakia, 3 from Greek Catholic Church, 1 from Other, 1 from Church of the Brethren and 1 from Ad hoc movements.
