= Kysucké Nové Mesto =

- Municipality
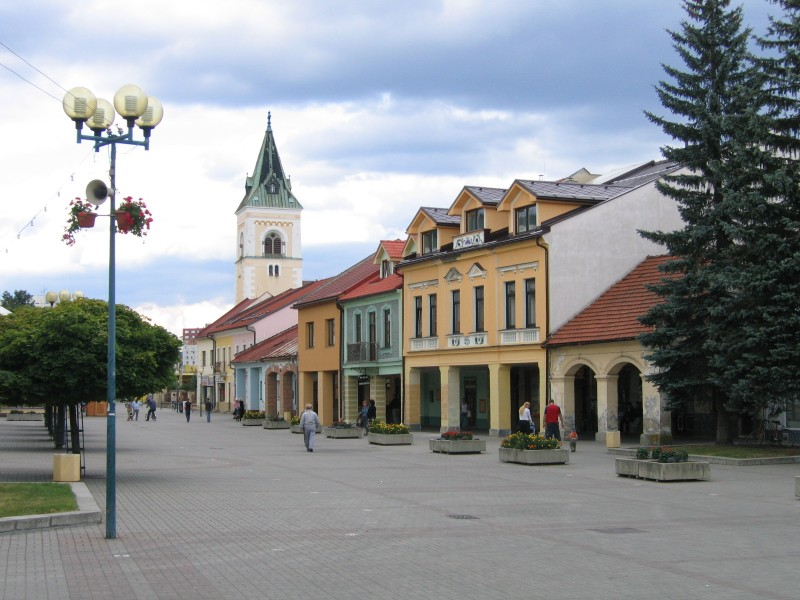
- Centre of the city, the Námestie Slobody ("Freedom Square")

- Flag Coat of arms

- Location of Kysucké Nové Mesto in the Žilina Region Location of Kysucké Nové Mesto in Slovakia
- Coordinates: 49.30°N 18.79°E
- Country: Slovakia
- Region: Žilina Region
- District: Kysucké Nové Mesto District
- First mentioned: 1246

Government
  - Mayor: Marián Mihalda

Area
  - Total: 26.41 km^{2} (10.20 sq mi)
- Elevation: 362 m (1,188 ft)

Population (2025)
  - Total: 14,213
- Time zone: UTC+1 (CET)
  - Summer (DST): UTC+2 (CEST)
- Postal code: 240 1
- Area code: +421 41
- Vehicle registration plate (until 2022): KM
- Website: www.kysuckenovemesto.sk

Kysucké Nové Mesto (German: Kischützneustadt / Oberneustadl; Hungarian: Kiszucaújhely) is a town in Žilina Region, Slovakia, near the city of Žilina.

== History ==
=== Early settlement ===
In 1976 lumps of burnt clay and ceramics were found under Stránsky vrch, which highlighted the settlement in this area. Archaeologists date the acquired material back to the La Tène Age. These findings are now stored in the Manor-house of Radoľa located near Kysucké Nové Mesto

=== Middle Ages ===
The town is mentioned for the first time in 1254 (under the name Jesesin, in the Bela's IV donation treaty). In 1321 lachasin is mentioned as a place where toll is collected. The privileges of a town with a market law were given the city (under the name Congesberg) in 1325. In 1358 the name of Nova Civitas (Nové Mesto - New Town) is already used. The inhabitants were mainly engaged in agriculture, sheep breeding, trade and handcraft.

=== Modern Period ===
The town in the 19th century was falling due to the floods (in 1813, 1821), the fires (1823, 1904), but also due to the large expatriation in the whole region. After the fire in August 1904, only 30 homes remained in the city. The economic development of the city took place after the Second World War.

The Kysucké Nové Mesto developed mainly the engineering industry.

The relationship with Austro-Hungary was expressed by inhabitants during the WWI in the Riot in Kragujevac (June 2, 1918).

In World War II people fought with German occupation forces not only in Slovakia in the Slovak national uprising, but also in European struggles, contributing to the defeat of fascism.

=== Contemporary period ===
Kysucké Nové Mesto has been making its present form for centuries. The biggest and fastest changes occurred after World War II.

The importance of the town increased after the year 1950, when the Závody presného strojárstva (later ZVL) were created. The company provided work to thousands of people and started significant changes in the town.

New housing estates, schools, offices, shops, sports facilities were created. Kysucké Nové Mesto has a built infrastructure that is currently being improved to meet the needs of its residents and visitors.

Names

- 150 - Asanka - according to the Greek geographer Ptolemy- settlement lying on the amber road
- 1254 - Jesesin
- 1300 - Yesesin
- 1338 - Jachatin - Chateau of the count Mikuláš Zeech - regional judge, but also the name Lethesin appears in the documents. The part of the word 'Jacha' probably represents name Jakub(James the Less - the patron of the town) and 'Tin' means the castle (the Castle of James).
- 1325 - following names:
  - Congesbergh
  - Kongesberg
  - Königsberg - the Královský vrch (now the Tábor hill), under which the river Kysuca flows. The name of Königsberg was not used, still it was called with the Slavic name Jačatín, because most of its inhabitants formed Slavic ethnicity.
- 1358 - Civitas Nova - Castrum Novum - New Town during Ľudovít Veľký
- 1438 - Nowe Mesto - name Jačatín (Jachatin) did not disappear
- 1507 - Kisucza UJhely (Ujvar)
- 1784 - Horní Nové Mesto
- 1873 - Nové Mesto nad Kysucou
- 1907 - Kisuca Ujhely - at the time of Magyarization
- 1920 - Kysucké Nové Mesto

== Geography ==
The municipality lies at an altitude of 362 metres (1,188 ft) and covers an area of 26.41 km^{2} (10.20 sq mi) (2025).

It is located in the Kysuca river valley, between the Javorníky and Kysucká vrchovina mountains, about 10 km (6.21 mi) north of Žilina.

== Population ==
Historical population
Year	Pop.	±%
1970	8,535	—
1980	12,578	+47.4%
1991	15,793	+25.6%
2001	16,558	+4.8%
2011	15,699	−5.2%
2021	14,660	−6.6%
Source: Censuses

Population statistic (10 years)
Year	1995	2005	2015	2025
Count	16,225	16,470	15,324	14,213
Difference		+1.51%	−6.95%	−7.25%

Population statistic
Year	2024	2025
Count	14,306	14,213
Difference		−0.65%

It has a population of 14,213 people (31 December 2025).

=== Ethnicity ===
Census 2021 (1+ %)
Ethnicity	Number	Fraction
Slovak	13,800	94.13%
Not found out	795	5.42%
Total	14,660	

In year 2021 was 14,660 people by ethnicity 13,800 as Slovak, 795 as Not found out, 129 as Czech, 48 as Other, 16 as Polish, 14 as Hungarian, 13 as Rusyn, 11 as Vietnamese, 10 as Romani, 9 as Russian, 8 as Ukrainian, 7 as German, 4 as Jewish, 4 as Chinese, 4 as Italian, 4 as Austrian, 4 as Moravian, 4 as Greek, 2 as Irish, 2 as Romanian, 2 as English, 1 as Serbian, 1 as Korean, 1 as French, 1 as Bulgarian and 1 as Albanian.

Note on population: The difference values of population numbers in the table "Population statistic" and in the sections "Ethnicity" & "Religion" is caused by the use of various statistical methods.

=== Religion ===
Census 2021 (1+ %)
Religion	Number	Fraction
Roman Catholic Church	10,826	73.85%
None	2346	16%
Not found out	1037	7.07%
Total	14,660	

In year 2021 was 14,660 people by religion 10,826 from Roman Catholic Church, 2346 from None, 1037 from Not found out, 105 from Evangelical Church, 79 from Greek Catholic Church, 73 from Christian Congregations in Slovakia, 39 from Ad hoc movements, 29 from Other, 25 from Calvinist Church, 25 from Other and not ascertained christian church, 18 from Jehovah's Witnesses, 18 from Buddhism, 11 from Eastern Orthodox Church, 10 from Paganism and natural spirituality, 8 from Jewish community, 3 from Islam, 3 from United Methodist Church, 2 from Old Catholic Church, 1 from Czechoslovak Hussite Church, 1 from Church of the Brethren and 1 from Seventh-day Adventist Church.

== Twin towns — sister cities ==
Kysucké Nové Mesto is twinned with:

- Gogolin, Poland
- Jablunkov, Czech Republic
- Łodygowice, Poland
- Rive-de-Gier, France
