= Ochodnica =

- Municipality
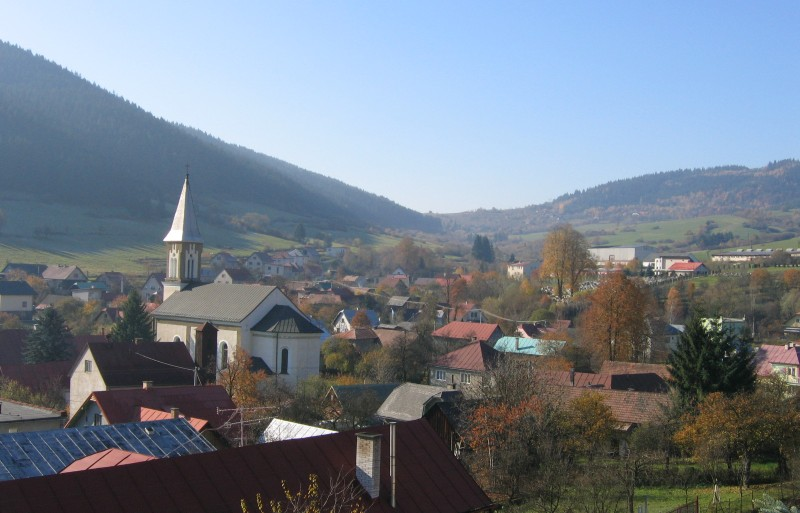

- Flag

- Location of Ochodnica in the Žilina Region Location of Ochodnica in Slovakia
- Coordinates: 49.35°N 18.78°E
- Country: Slovakia
- Region: Žilina Region
- District: Kysucké Nové Mesto District
- First mentioned: 1598

Area
  - Total: 18.05 km^{2} (6.97 sq mi)
- Elevation: 400 m (1,300 ft)

Population (2025)
  - Total: 1,915
- Time zone: UTC+1 (CET)
  - Summer (DST): UTC+2 (CEST)
- Postal code: 233 5
- Area code: +421 41
- Vehicle registration plate (until 2022): KM
- Website: www.ochodnica.sk

Ochodnica (Hungarian: Ösvényes, until 1899 Ochodnicza) is a village and municipality in Kysucké Nové Mesto District in the Zilina Region of northern Slovakia.

== History ==
In historical records the village was first mentioned in 1598.

== Geography ==
The municipality lies at an altitude of 400 metres (1,300 ft) and covers an area of 18.05 km^{2} (6.97 sq mi) (2025).

== Population ==
Population statistic (10 years)
Year	1995	2005	2015	2025
Count	2042	1987	1929	1915
Difference		−2.69%	−2.91%	−0.72%

Population statistic
Year	2024	2025
Count	1933	1915
Difference		−0.93%

It has a population of 1915 people (31 December 2025).

=== Ethnicity ===
Census 2021 (1+ %)
Ethnicity	Number	Fraction
Slovak	1871	97.34%
Not found out	48	2.49%
Total	1922	

In year 2021 was 1922 people by ethnicity 1871 as Slovak, 48 as Not found out, 16 as Czech, 4 as German, 3 as Hungarian, 2 as Rusyn, 2 as Other, 1 as Moravian and 1 as English.

Note on population: The difference values of population numbers in the table "Population statistic" and in the sections "Ethnicity" & "Religion" is caused by the use of various statistical methods.

=== Religion ===
Census 2021 (1+ %)
Religion	Number	Fraction
Roman Catholic Church	1580	82.21%
None	215	11.19%
Not found out	72	3.75%
Christian Congregations in Slovakia	25	1.3%
Total	1922	

In year 2021 was 1922 people by religion 1580 from Roman Catholic Church, 215 from None, 72 from Not found out, 25 from Christian Congregations in Slovakia, 8 from Greek Catholic Church, 6 from Calvinist Church, 5 from Other, 5 from Evangelical Church, 2 from Other and not ascertained christian church, 2 from Buddhism, 1 from Apostolic Church and 1 from Ad hoc movements.
