= Kysucký Lieskovec =

- Municipality
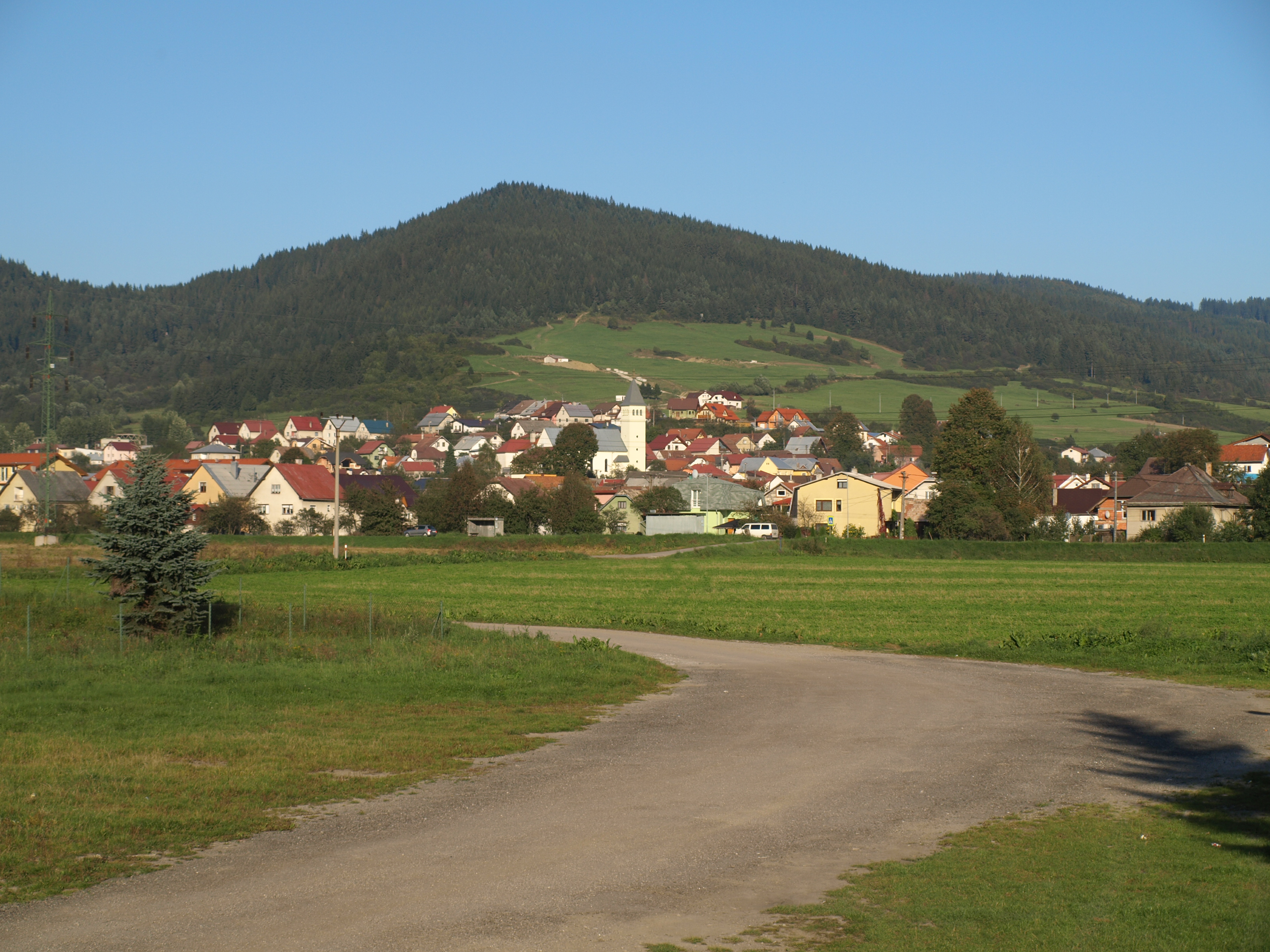

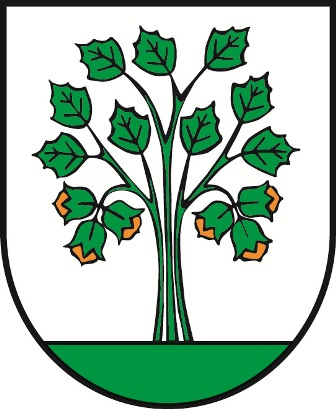
- Flag Coat of arms

- Location of Kysucký Lieskovec in the Žilina Region Location of Kysucký Lieskovec in Slovakia
- Coordinates: 49.33°N 18.82°E
- Country: Slovakia
- Region: Žilina Region
- District: Kysucké Nové Mesto District
- First mentioned: 1438

Area
  - Total: 12.32 km^{2} (4.76 sq mi)
- Elevation: 368 m (1,207 ft)

Population (2025)
  - Total: 2,324
- Time zone: UTC+1 (CET)
  - Summer (DST): UTC+2 (CEST)
- Postal code: 233 4
- Area code: +421 41
- Vehicle registration plate (until 2022): KM
- Website: www.kysuckylieskovec.sk

Kysucký Lieskovec (Hungarian: Újhelymogyoród, until 1899 Lieszkovecz) is a village and municipality in Kysucké Nové Mesto District in the Zilina Region of northern Slovakia

== History ==
In historical records the village was first mentioned in 1438

== Geography ==
The municipality lies at an altitude of 368 metres (1,207 ft) and covers an area of 12.32 km^{2} (4.76 sq mi) (2025).

== Population ==
Population statistic (10 years)
Year	1995	2005	2015	2025
Count	2268	2274	2360	2324
Difference		+0.26%	+3.78%	−1.52%

Population statistic
Year	2024	2025
Count	2322	2324
Difference		+0.08%

It has a population of 2324 people (31 December 2025).

=== Ethnicity ===
Census 2021 (1+ %)
Ethnicity	Number	Fraction
Slovak	2246	94.44%
Not found out	130	5.46%
Total	2378	

In year 2021 was 2378 people by ethnicity 2246 as Slovak, 130 as Not found out, 17 as Czech, 9 as Other, 2 as Vietnamese, 2 as Albanian, 1 as Jewish, 1 as Irish, 1 as Ukrainian, 1 as Italian, 1 as Russian, 1 as Polish, 1 as German and 1 as Hungarian.

Note on population: The difference values of population numbers in the table "Population statistic" and in the sections "Ethnicity" & "Religion" is caused by the use of various statistical methods.

=== Religion ===
Census 2021 (1+ %)
Religion	Number	Fraction
Roman Catholic Church	2025	85.16%
None	187	7.86%
Not found out	114	4.79%
Total	2378	

In year 2021 was 2378 people by religion 2025 from Roman Catholic Church, 187 from None, 114 from Not found out, 10 from Christian Congregations in Slovakia, 8 from Other, 7 from Other and not ascertained christian church, 5 from Evangelical Church, 4 from Greek Catholic Church, 4 from Ad hoc movements, 2 from Calvinist Church, 2 from Paganism and natural spirituality, 2 from Islam, 2 from Church of the Brethren, 2 from Buddhism, 1 from Old Catholic Church, 1 from Hinduism, 1 from United Methodist Church and 1 from Czechoslovak Hussite Church.
