= Rudinská =

Village and municipality in Slovakia

- Municipality
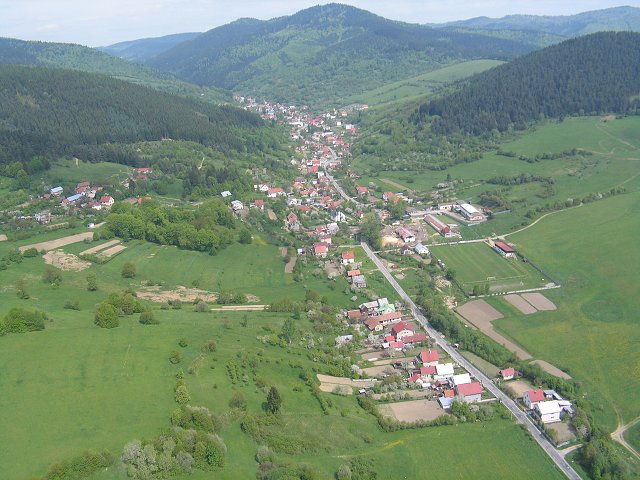

- Flag

- Location of Rudinská in the Žilina Region Location of Rudinská in Slovakia
- Coordinates: 49.32°N 18.72°E
- Country: Slovakia
- Region: Žilina Region
- District: Kysucké Nové Mesto District
- First mentioned: 1598

Area
  - Total: 10.76 km^{2} (4.15 sq mi)
- Elevation: 448 m (1,470 ft)

Population (2025)
  - Total: 1,044
- Time zone: UTC+1 (CET)
  - Summer (DST): UTC+2 (CEST)
- Postal code: 233 1
- Area code: +421 41
- Vehicle registration plate (until 2022): KM
- Website: rudinska.sk

Rudinská (Hungarian: Rezsőfalva) is a village and municipality in Kysucké Nové Mesto District in the Žilina Region of northern Slovakia.

== History ==
In historical records the village was first mentioned in 1598.

== Geography ==
The municipality lies at an altitude of 448 metres (1,470 ft) and covers an area of 10.76 km^{2} (4.15 sq mi) (2025).

== Population ==
Population statistic (10 years)
Year	1995	2005	2015	2025
Count	883	979	987	1044
Difference		+10.87%	+0.81%	+5.77%

Population statistic
Year	2024	2025
Count	1035	1044
Difference		+0.86%

It has a population of 1044 people (31 December 2025).

=== Ethnicity ===
Census 2021 (1+ %)
Ethnicity	Number	Fraction
Slovak	971	95.66%
Not found out	44	4.33%
Total	1015	

In year 2021 was 1015 people by ethnicity 971 as Slovak, 44 as Not found out, 7 as Czech, 2 as Russian, 1 as Other and 1 as French.

Note on population: The difference values of population numbers in the table "Population statistic" and in the sections "Ethnicity" & "Religion" is caused by the use of various statistical methods.

=== Religion ===
Census 2021 (1+ %)
Religion	Number	Fraction
Roman Catholic Church	877	86.4%
None	58	5.71%
Not found out	48	4.73%
Total	1015	

In year 2021 was 1015 people by religion 877 from Roman Catholic Church, 58 from None, 48 from Not found out, 7 from Greek Catholic Church, 6 from Calvinist Church, 6 from Evangelical Church, 4 from Christian Congregations in Slovakia, 3 from Other and not ascertained christian church, 1 from Old Catholic Church, 1 from Eastern Orthodox Church, 1 from Other, 1 from United Methodist Church, 1 from Seventh-day Adventist Church and 1 from Ad hoc movements.
