= Rudina, Kysucké Nové Mesto District =

Village and municipality in Slovakia

Rudina
- Municipality
- Flag

- Location of Rudina in the Žilina Region Location of Rudina in Slovakia
- Coordinates: 49°17′N 18°45′E
- Country: Slovakia
- Region: Žilina Region
- District: Kysucké Nové Mesto District
- First mentioned: 1359

Area
  - Total: 6.27 km^{2} (2.42 sq mi)
- Elevation: 370 m (1,210 ft)

Population (2025)
  - Total: 1,786
- Time zone: UTC+1 (CET)
  - Summer (DST): UTC+2 (CEST)
- Postal code: 233 1
- Area code: +421 41
- Vehicle registration plate (until 2022): KM
- Website: rudina.sk

Rudina (Hungarian: Nagyrudas) is a village and municipality in Kysucké Nové Mesto District in the Zilina Region of northern Slovakia.

== History ==
In historical records the village was first mentioned in 1359.

== Geography ==
The municipality lies at an altitude of 370 metres (1,210 ft) and covers an area of 6.27 km^{2} (2.42 sq mi) (2025).

== Population ==
Population statistic (10 years)
Year	1995	2005	2015	2025
Count	1495	1674	1767	1786
Difference		+11.97%	+5.55%	+1.07%

Population statistic
Year	2024	2025
Count	1799	1786
Difference		−0.72%

It has a population of 1786 people (31 December 2025).

=== Ethnicity ===
Census 2021 (1+ %)
Ethnicity	Number	Fraction
Slovak	1749	96.41%
Not found out	56	3.08%
Czech	21	1.15%
Total	1814	

In year 2021 was 1814 people by ethnicity 1749 as Slovak, 56 as Not found out, 21 as Czech, 8 as Other, 3 as Polish, 3 as German, 2 as Italian, 2 as English, 1 as Irish, 1 as Ukrainian and 1 as Russian.

Note on population: The difference values of population numbers in the table "Population statistic" and in the sections "Ethnicity" & "Religion" is caused by the use of various statistical methods.

=== Religion ===
Census 2021 (1+ %)
Religion	Number	Fraction
Roman Catholic Church	1473	81.2%
None	218	12.02%
Not found out	60	3.31%
Total	1814	

In year 2021 was 1814 people by religion 1473 from Roman Catholic Church, 218 from None, 60 from Not found out, 17 from Evangelical Church, 9 from Christian Congregations in Slovakia, 9 from Greek Catholic Church, 7 from Other and not ascertained christian church, 5 from Jehovah's Witnesses, 5 from Ad hoc movements, 2 from Calvinist Church, 2 from Paganism and natural spirituality, 2 from Other, 2 from Buddhism, 2 from Baptists Church and 1 from Apostolic Church.
