= Pucov =

Pucov may refer to places:

- Pucov (Třebíč District), Czech Republic
- Pucov, Dolný Kubín District, Slovakia
