= Párnica =

- Municipality
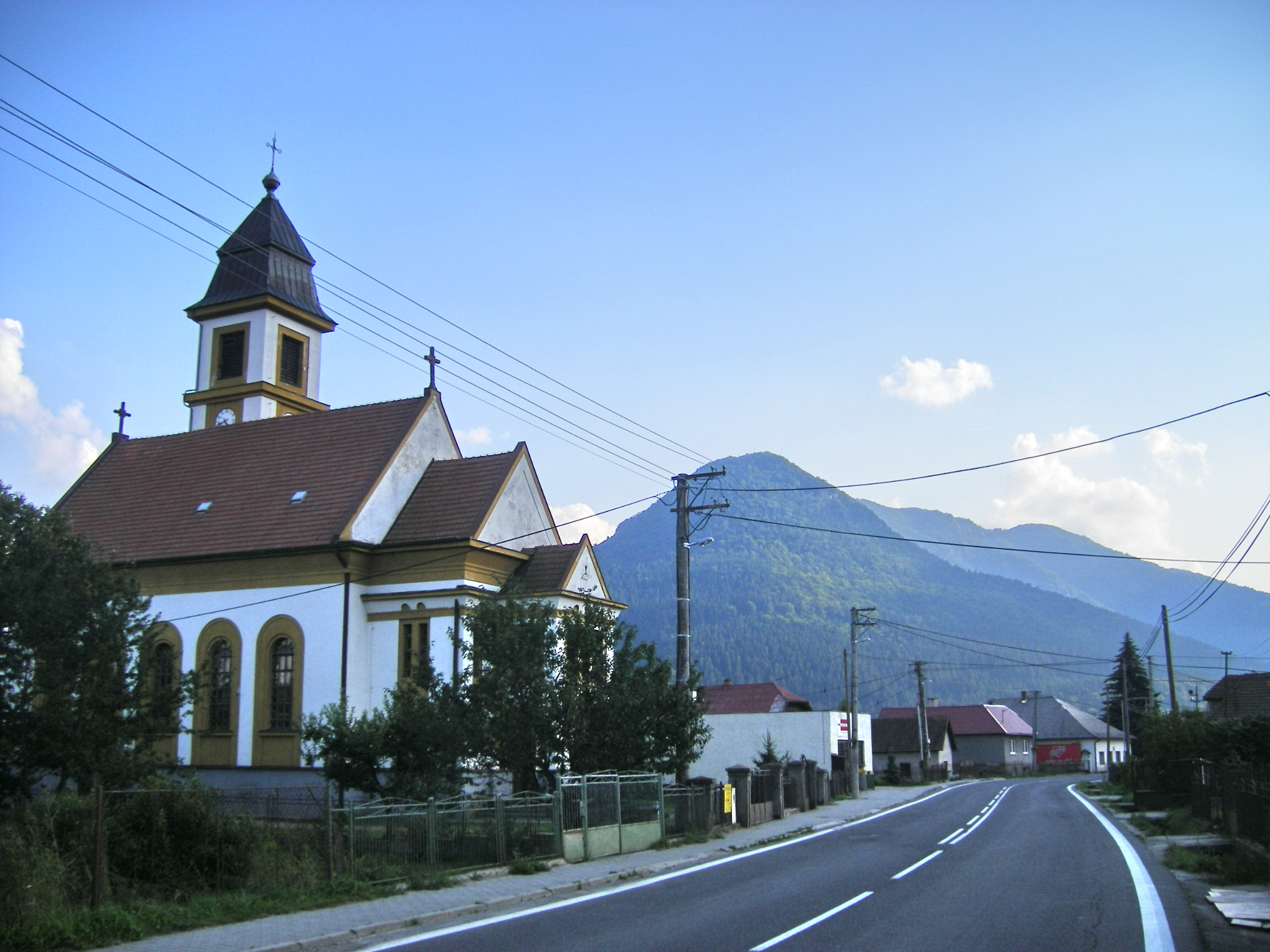

- Flag

- Location of Párnica in the Žilina Region Location of Párnica in Slovakia
- Coordinates: 49.20°N 19.20°E
- Country: Slovakia
- Region: Žilina Region
- District: Dolný Kubín District
- First mentioned: 1420

Area
  - Total: 50.40 km^{2} (19.46 sq mi)
- Elevation: 455 m (1,493 ft)

Population (2025)
  - Total: 987
- Time zone: UTC+1 (CET)
  - Summer (DST): UTC+2 (CEST)
- Postal code: 275 2
- Area code: +421 43
- Vehicle registration plate (until 2022): DK
- Website: www.parnica.sk

Párnica is a village and municipality in Dolný Kubín District in the Zilina Region of northern Slovakia.

== History ==
In historical records the village was first mentioned in 1420. Before the establishment of independent Czechoslovakia in 1918, Párnica was part of Árva County within the Kingdom of Hungary. From 1939 to 1945, it was part of the Slovak Republic.

== Geography ==
The municipality lies at an altitude of 455 metres (1,493 ft) and covers an area of 50.40 km^{2} (19.46 sq mi) (2025).

== Population ==
Population statistic (10 years)
Year	1995	2005	2015	2025
Count	746	741	865	987
Difference		−0.67%	+16.73%	+14.10%

Population statistic
Year	2024	2025
Count	988	987
Difference		−0.10%

It has a population of 987 people (31 December 2025).

=== Ethnicity ===
Census 2021 (1+ %)
Ethnicity	Number	Fraction
Slovak	931	99.46%
Total	936	

In year 2021 was 936 people by ethnicity 931 as Slovak, 9 as Czech, 4 as Other, 2 as Not found out, 2 as Canadian, 1 as Austrian and 1 as Polish.

Note on population: The difference values of population numbers in the table "Population statistic" and in the sections "Ethnicity" & "Religion" is caused by the use of various statistical methods.

=== Religion ===
Census 2021 (1+ %)
Religion	Number	Fraction
Evangelical Church	473	50.53%
Roman Catholic Church	283	30.24%
None	160	17.09%
Total	936	

In year 2021 was 936 people by religion 473 from Evangelical Church, 283 from Roman Catholic Church, 160 from None, 5 from Ad hoc movements, 3 from Christian Congregations in Slovakia, 3 from Islam, 2 from Other, 2 from Greek Catholic Church, 2 from Buddhism, 1 from Paganism and natural spirituality, 1 from Jehovah's Witnesses and 1 from Seventh-day Adventist Church.
