= Medzibrodie nad Oravou =

Village and municipality in Dolný Kubín District in northern Slovakia

- Municipality
- Flag

- Location of Medzibrodie nad Oravou in the Žilina Region Location of Medzibrodie nad Oravou in Slovakia
- Coordinates: 49.23°N 19.35°E
- Country: Slovakia
- Region: Žilina Region
- District: Dolný Kubín District
- First mentioned: 1408

Area
  - Total: 6.57 km^{2} (2.54 sq mi)
- Elevation: 493 m (1,617 ft)

Population (2025)
  - Total: 634
- Time zone: UTC+1 (CET)
  - Summer (DST): UTC+2 (CEST)
- Postal code: 260 1
- Area code: +421 43
- Vehicle registration plate (until 2022): DK
- Website: www.medzibrodienadoravou.sk

Medzibrodie nad Oravou (Hungarian: Medzibrogy) is a village and municipality in Dolný Kubín District in the Žilina Region of northern Slovakia. It stands at 549 m (1801 ft) and has a population of 475.

== Geography ==
The municipality lies at an altitude of 493 metres (1,617 ft) and covers an area of 6.57 km^{2} (2.54 sq mi) (2025).

== History ==
Before the establishment of independent Czechoslovakia in 1918, Medzibrodie nad Oravou was part of Árva County within the Kingdom of Hungary. From 1939 to 1945, it was part of the Slovak Republic.

== Population ==
Population statistic (10 years)
Year	1995	2005	2015	2025
Count	418	443	511	634
Difference		+5.98%	+15.34%	+24.07%

Population statistic
Year	2024	2025
Count	626	634
Difference		+1.27%

It has a population of 634 people (31 December 2025).

=== Ethnicity ===
Census 2021 (1+ %)
Ethnicity	Number	Fraction
Slovak	566	98.95%
Not found out	7	1.22%
Total	572	

In year 2021 was 572 people by ethnicity 566 as Slovak, 7 as Not found out, 4 as Hungarian, 3 as Czech, 1 as Ukrainian, 1 as Russian, 1 as Polish and 1 as Other.

Note on population: The difference values of population numbers in the table "Population statistic" and in the sections "Ethnicity" & "Religion" is caused by the use of various statistical methods.

=== Religion ===
Census 2021 (1+ %)
Religion	Number	Fraction
Roman Catholic Church	519	90.73%
None	39	6.82%
Total	572	

In year 2021 was 572 people by religion 519 from Roman Catholic Church, 39 from None, 5 from Evangelical Church, 3 from Not found out, 2 from Greek Catholic Church, 1 from Other, 1 from United Methodist Church, 1 from Buddhism and 1 from Ad hoc movements.
