= Osádka =

- Municipality
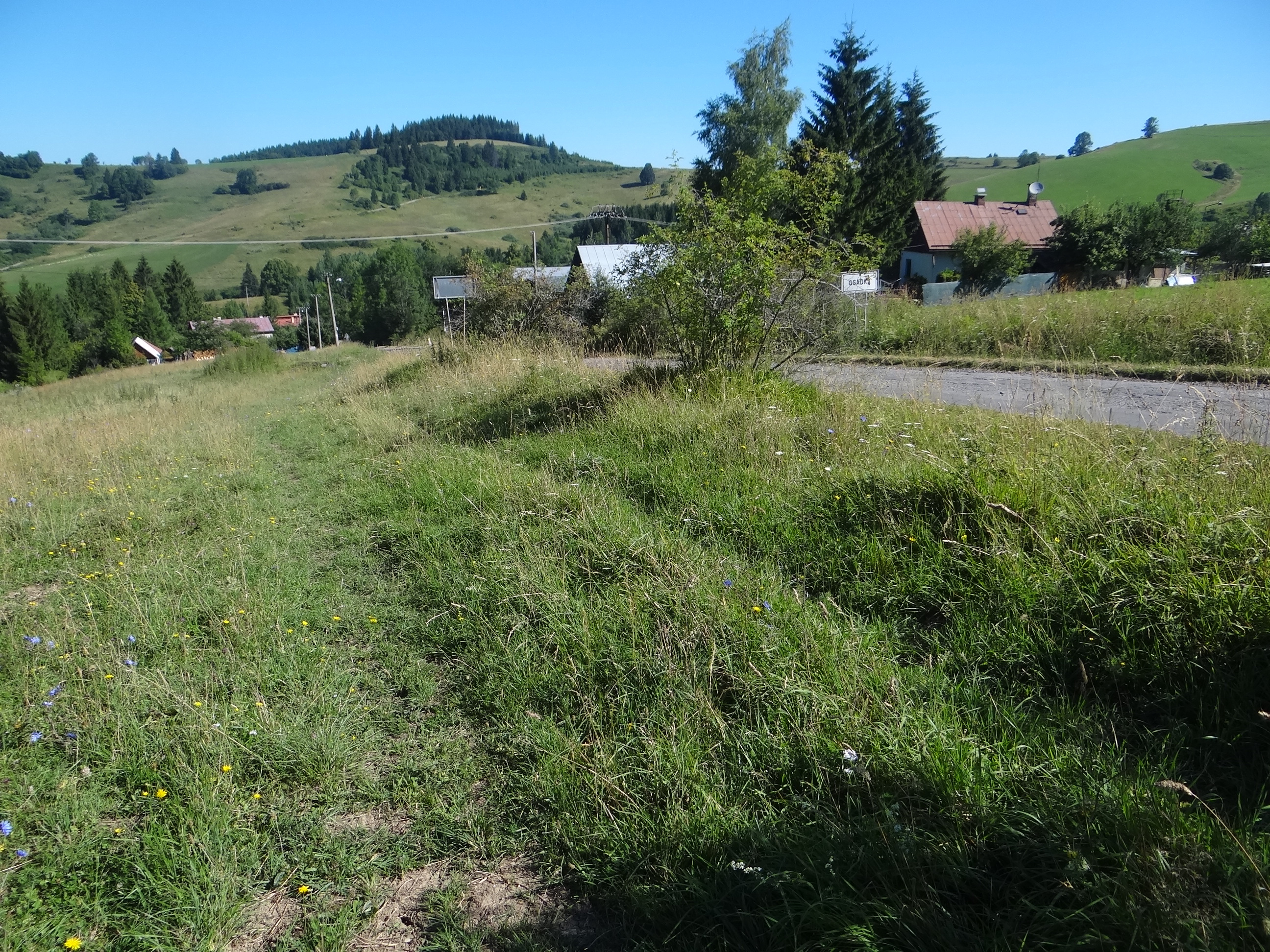

- Flag

- Location of Osádka in the Žilina Region Location of Osádka in Slovakia
- Coordinates: 49.18°N 19.38°E
- Country: Slovakia
- Region: Žilina Region
- District: Dolný Kubín District
- First mentioned: 1381

Area
  - Total: 4.08 km^{2} (1.58 sq mi)
- Elevation: 678 m (2,224 ft)

Population (2025)
  - Total: 170
- Time zone: UTC+1 (CET)
  - Summer (DST): UTC+2 (CEST)
- Postal code: 270 1
- Area code: +421 43
- Vehicle registration plate (until 2022): DK
- Website: www.osadka.sk

Osádka (Hungarian: Oszádka) is a village and municipality in Dolný Kubín District in the Zilina Region of northern Slovakia.

== History ==
In historical records the village was first mentioned in 1381. Before the establishment of independent Czechoslovakia in 1918, Osádka was part of Árva County within the Kingdom of Hungary. From 1939 to 1945, it was part of the Slovak Republic.

== Geography ==
The municipality lies at an altitude of 678 metres (2,224 ft) and covers an area of 4.08 km^{2} (1.58 sq mi) (2025).

== Population ==
Population statistic (10 years)
Year	1995	2005	2015	2025
Count	155	142	142	170
Difference		−8.38%	+0%	+19.71%

Population statistic
Year	2024	2025
Count	175	170
Difference		−2.85%

It has a population of 170 people (31 December 2025).

=== Ethnicity ===
Census 2021 (1+ %)
Ethnicity	Number	Fraction
Slovak	162	95.85%
Not found out	8	4.73%
Total	169	

In year 2021 was 169 people by ethnicity 162 as Slovak and 8 as Not found out.

Note on population: The difference values of population numbers in the table "Population statistic" and in the sections "Ethnicity" & "Religion" is caused by the use of various statistical methods.

=== Religion ===
Census 2021 (1+ %)
Religion	Number	Fraction
Evangelical Church	83	49.11%
Roman Catholic Church	62	36.69%
None	17	10.06%
Not found out	7	4.14%
Total	169	

In year 2021 was 169 people by religion 83 from Evangelical Church, 62 from Roman Catholic Church, 17 from None and 7 from Not found out.
