= Žaškov =

- Municipality
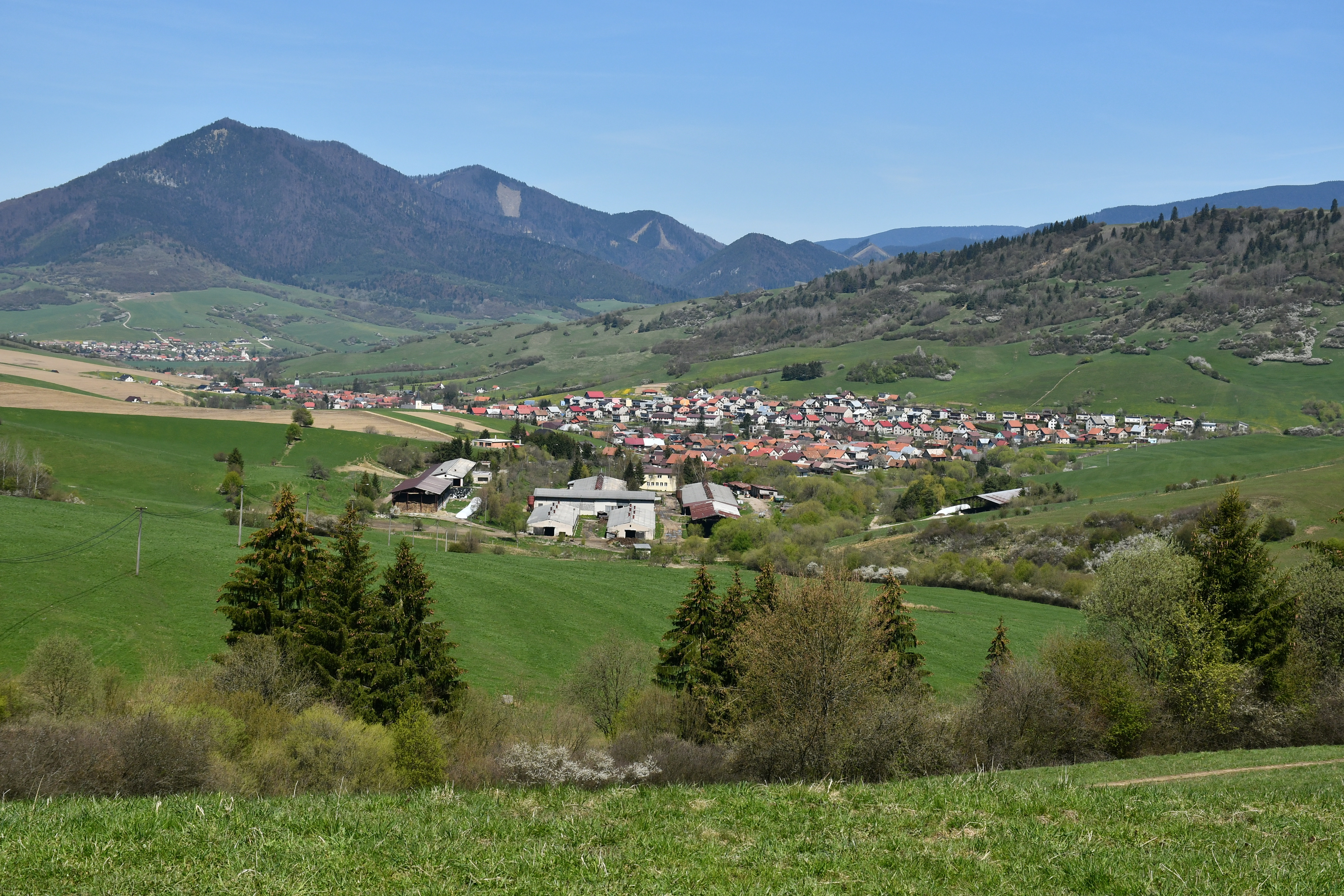

- Flag

- Location of Žaškov in the Žilina Region Location of Žaškov in Slovakia
- Coordinates: 49.17°N 19.22°E
- Country: Slovakia
- Region: Žilina Region
- District: Dolný Kubín District
- First mentioned: 1388

Area
  - Total: 24.72 km^{2} (9.54 sq mi)
- Elevation: 479 m (1,572 ft)

Population (2025)
  - Total: 1,618
- Time zone: UTC+1 (CET)
  - Summer (DST): UTC+2 (CEST)
- Postal code: 272 1
- Area code: +421 43
- Vehicle registration plate (until 2022): DK
- Website: www.zaskov.sk

Žaškov (Hungarian: Zsaskó) is a village and municipality in Dolný Kubín District in the Žilina Region of northern Slovakia.

== Geography ==
The municipality lies at an altitude of 479 metres (1,572 ft) and covers an area of 24.72 km^{2} (9.54 sq mi) (2025).

== History ==
In historical records, the village was first mentioned in 1380 as Dewczdorf (1382 Dewsdorff; 1388 Zsaskow). The law system of Žilina was applied here. Before the establishment of independent Czechoslovakia in 1918, Žaškov was part of Árva County within the Kingdom of Hungary. From 1939 to 1945, it was part of the Slovak Republic.

== Population ==
Population statistic (10 years)
Year	1995	2005	2015	2025
Count	1728	1702	1599	1618
Difference		−1.50%	−6.05%	+1.18%

Population statistic
Year	2024	2025
Count	1621	1618
Difference		−0.18%

It has a population of 1618 people (31 December 2025).

=== Ethnicity ===
Census 2021 (1+ %)
Ethnicity	Number	Fraction
Slovak	1602	98.76%
Not found out	17	1.04%
Total	1622	

In year 2021 was 1622 people by ethnicity 1602 as Slovak, 17 as Not found out, 7 as Czech, 3 as Other, 2 as Russian, 2 as Croatian, 1 as Ukrainian and 1 as Serbian.

Note on population: The difference values of population numbers in the table "Population statistic" and in the sections "Ethnicity" & "Religion" is caused by the use of various statistical methods.

=== Religion ===
Census 2021 (1+ %)
Religion	Number	Fraction
Evangelical Church	752	46.36%
Roman Catholic Church	686	42.29%
None	143	8.82%
Not found out	24	1.48%
Total	1622	

In year 2021 was 1622 people by religion 752 from Evangelical Church, 686 from Roman Catholic Church, 143 from None, 24 from Not found out, 5 from Other, 3 from Other and not ascertained christian church, 3 from United Methodist Church, 1 from Eastern Orthodox Church, 1 from Islam, 1 from Greek Catholic Church, 1 from Seventh-day Adventist Church, 1 from Buddhism and 1 from Ad hoc movements.
