= Oravská Poruba =

- Municipality
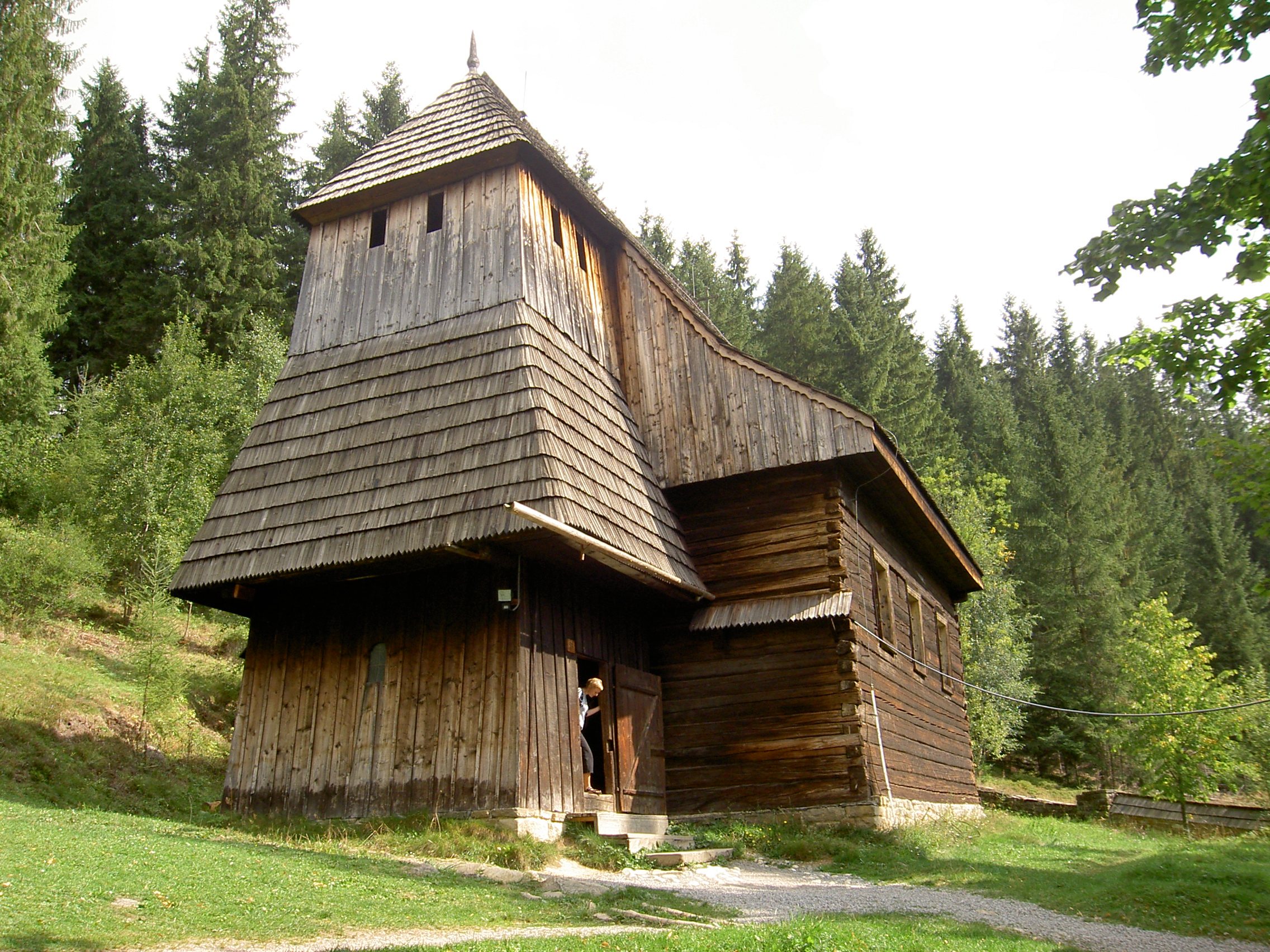

- Flag

- Location of Oravská Poruba in the Žilina Region Location of Oravská Poruba in Slovakia
- Coordinates: 49.19°N 19.27°E
- Country: Slovakia
- Region: Žilina Region
- District: Dolný Kubín District
- First mentioned: 1350

Area
  - Total: 13.19 km^{2} (5.09 sq mi)
- Elevation: 479 m (1,572 ft)

Population (2025)
  - Total: 1,104
- Time zone: UTC+1 (CET)
  - Summer (DST): UTC+2 (CEST)
- Postal code: 275 4
- Area code: +421 43
- Vehicle registration plate (until 2022): DK
- Website: www.oravskaporuba.sk

Oravská Poruba (Hungarian: Poruba) is a village and municipality in Dolný Kubín District in the Zilina Region of northern Slovakia. It stands at 487 m (1598 ft) and has a population of 1089.

== Geography ==
The municipality lies at an altitude of 479 metres (1,572 ft) and covers an area of 13.19 km^{2} (5.09 sq mi) (2025).

== History ==
Before the establishment of independent Czechoslovakia in 1918, Oravská Poruba was part of Árva County within the Kingdom of Hungary. From 1939 to 1945, it was part of the Slovak Republic.

== Population ==
Population statistic (10 years)
Year	1995	2005	2015	2025
Count	810	923	1045	1104
Difference		+13.95%	+13.21%	+5.64%

Population statistic
Year	2024	2025
Count	1083	1104
Difference		+1.93%

It has a population of 1104 people (31 December 2025).

=== Ethnicity ===
Census 2021 (1+ %)
Ethnicity	Number	Fraction
Slovak	1062	98.42%
Not found out	17	1.57%
Total	1079	

In year 2021 was 1079 people by ethnicity 1062 as Slovak, 17 as Not found out, 3 as Czech, 2 as German, 1 as Serbian, 1 as Russian, 1 as Polish, 1 as Other and 1 as Croatian.

Note on population: The difference values of population numbers in the table "Population statistic" and in the sections "Ethnicity" & "Religion" is caused by the use of various statistical methods.

=== Religion ===
Census 2021 (1+ %)
Religion	Number	Fraction
Evangelical Church	565	52.36%
Roman Catholic Church	340	31.51%
None	132	12.23%
Not found out	17	1.58%
Total	1079	

In year 2021 was 1079 people by religion 565 from Evangelical Church, 340 from Roman Catholic Church, 132 from None, 17 from Not found out, 9 from Other and not ascertained christian church, 6 from Other, 6 from Ad hoc movements, 3 from Greek Catholic Church and 1 from Calvinist Church.
