= Bziny =

- Municipality
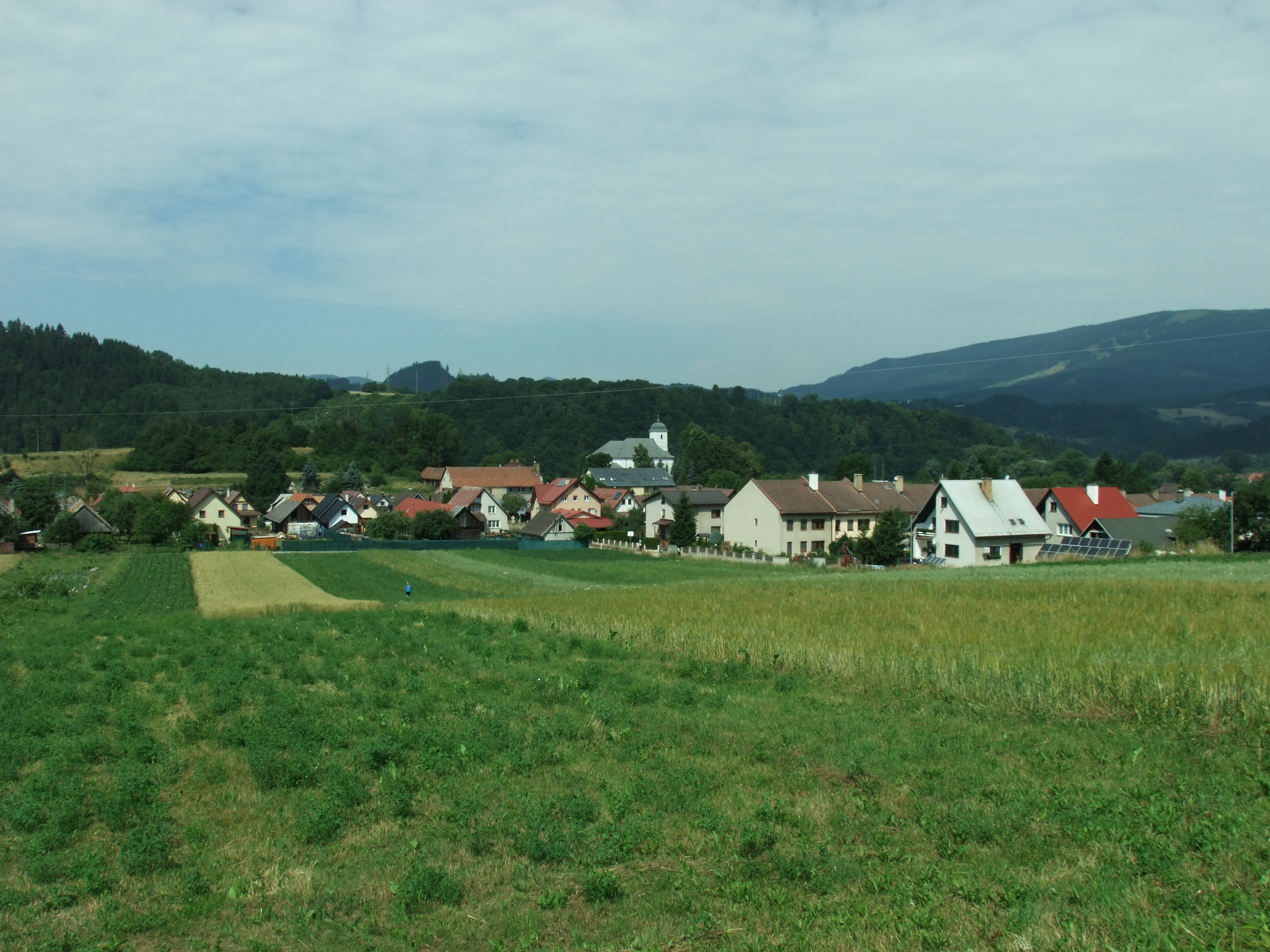

- Flag

- Location of Bziny in the Žilina Region Location of Bziny in Slovakia
- Coordinates: 49.23°N 19.32°E
- Country: Slovakia
- Region: Žilina Region
- District: Dolný Kubín District
- First mentioned: 1345

Area
  - Total: 5.84 km^{2} (2.25 sq mi)
- Elevation: 492 m (1,614 ft)

Population (2025)
  - Total: 591
- Time zone: UTC+1 (CET)
  - Summer (DST): UTC+2 (CEST)
- Postal code: 260 1
- Area code: +421 43
- Vehicle registration plate (until 2022): DK
- Website: www.bziny.eu

Bziny (Hungarian: Bezine) is a village and municipality in Dolný Kubín District in the Zilina Region of northern Slovakia.

== History ==
In historical records the village was first mentioned in 1345. Before the establishment of independent Czechoslovakia in 1918, Bziny was part of Árva County within the Kingdom of Hungary. From 1939 to 1945, it was part of the Slovak Republic.

== Geography ==
The municipality lies at an altitude of 492 metres (1,614 ft) and covers an area of 5.84 km^{2} (2.25 sq mi) (2025).

== See also ==
- List of municipalities and towns in Slovakia

== Population ==
Population statistic (10 years)
Year	1995	2005	2015	2025
Count	436	525	564	591
Difference		+20.41%	+7.42%	+4.78%

Population statistic
Year	2024	2025
Count	598	591
Difference		−1.17%

It has a population of 591 people (31 December 2025).

=== Ethnicity ===
Census 2021 (1+ %)
Ethnicity	Number	Fraction
Slovak	569	98.44%
Not found out	20	3.46%
Total	578	

In year 2021 was 578 people by ethnicity 569 as Slovak, 20 as Not found out, 3 as French, 1 as Czech, 1 as Russian, 1 as Other and 1 as English.

Note on population: The difference values of population numbers in the table "Population statistic" and in the sections "Ethnicity" & "Religion" is caused by the use of various statistical methods.

=== Religion ===
Census 2021 (1+ %)
Religion	Number	Fraction
Roman Catholic Church	473	81.83%
None	72	12.46%
Evangelical Church	17	2.94%
Not found out	8	1.38%
Total	578	

In year 2021 was 578 people by religion 473 from Roman Catholic Church, 72 from None, 17 from Evangelical Church, 8 from Not found out, 3 from Christian Congregations in Slovakia, 1 from Old Catholic Church, 1 from Other and not ascertained christian church, 1 from Other, 1 from Greek Catholic Church and 1 from Baptists Church.

== Genealogical resources ==
The records for genealogical research are available at the state archive "Statny Archiv in Bytca, Slovakia"

- Roman Catholic church records (births/marriages/deaths): 1787-1896 (parish A)
