= Veličná =

- Municipality
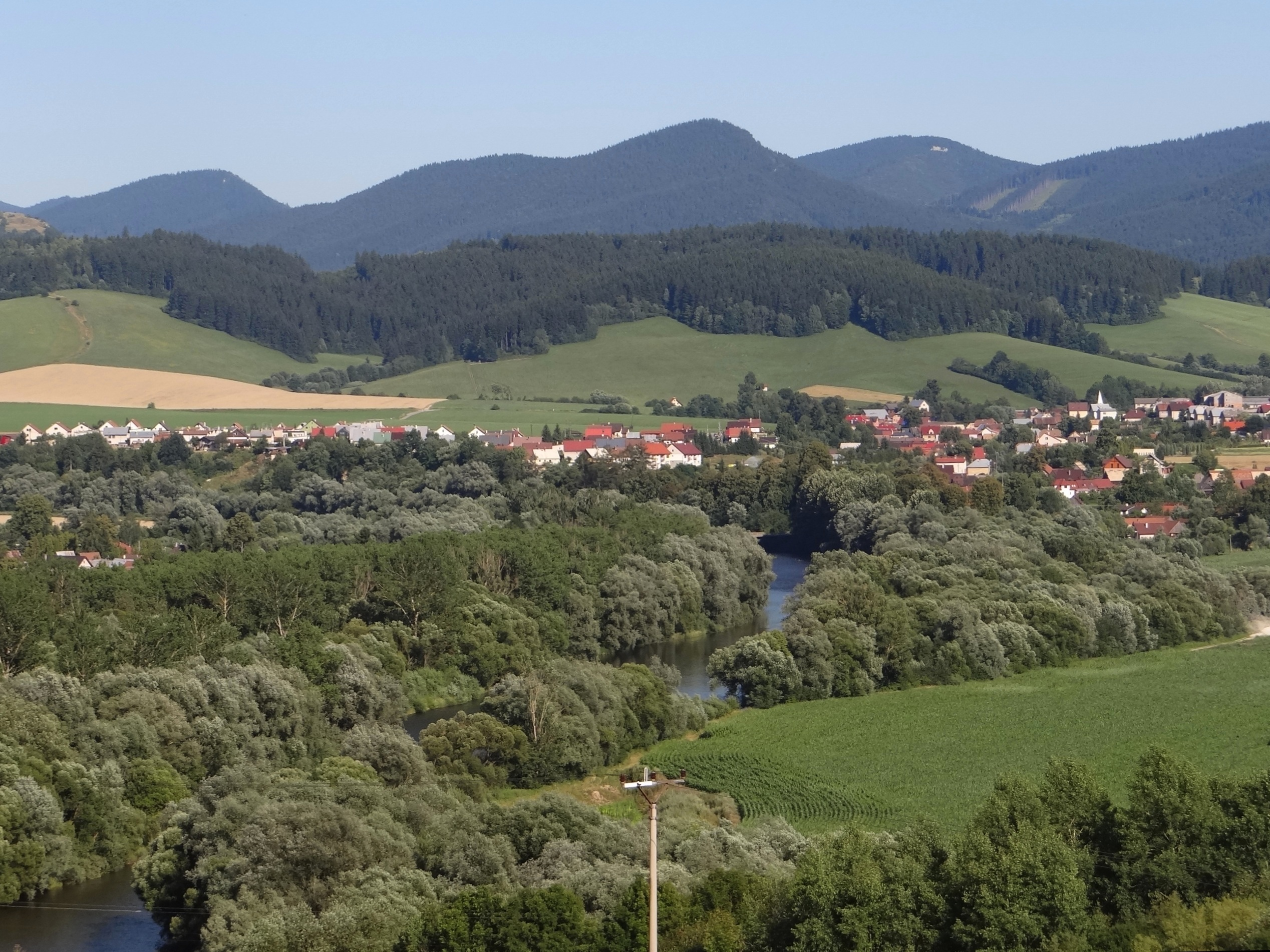

- Flag

- Location of Veličná in the Žilina Region Location of Veličná in Slovakia
- Coordinates: 49.23°N 19.23°E
- Country: Slovakia
- Region: Žilina Region
- District: Dolný Kubín District
- First mentioned: 1272

Area
  - Total: 29.30 km^{2} (11.31 sq mi)
- Elevation: 484 m (1,588 ft)

Population (2025)
  - Total: 1,670
- Time zone: UTC+1 (CET)
  - Summer (DST): UTC+2 (CEST)
- Postal code: 275 4
- Area code: +421 43
- Vehicle registration plate (until 2022): DK
- Website: www.velicna.sk

Veličná (Hungarian: Nagyfalu) is a village and municipality in Dolný Kubín District in the Žilina Region of northern Slovakia.

== Name ==
Veličná was first mentioned under the Latin name Magna Villa in a decree of Ladislaus IV of Hungary from 1272. In the middle ages, the town was known also under the name Welkeg Wsy (Veľké Vsy, The Big Village) and the Hungarized forms Nag Flaw and Naghffalva.

== History ==
The settlement grew in a relatively sparsely populated borderland area on an important trade route to Poland. By 1454, Veličná was already a smaller town. The town acquired several royal privileges (especially the privilege to trade with Polish salt) that positively influenced its economic development. By 1520, the town had become influential enough to become the seat of Orava County. In the 16th century, the region suffered several uprisings, which led George Thurzo to grant its citizens additional privileges to improve the economic situation.

In 1683, the town was sacked by Lithuanian troops led by Jan Kazimierz Sapieha the Younger en route to the Battle of Vienna. The casualties from this sacking included Veličná's town and county archive. The seat of the county was moved to Dolný Kubín; Veličná was burned again (twice) in 1686 and never fully recovered. The population decreased again during plague outbreaks in 1732, 1739, and 1742. In 1871, the town lost its status and became a village.

Before the establishment of independent Czechoslovakia in 1918, Veličná was part of Árva County within the Kingdom of Hungary. From 1939 to 1945, it was part of the Slovak Republic.

== Geography ==
The municipality lies at an altitude of 484 metres (1,588 ft) and covers an area of 29.30 km^{2} (11.31 sq mi) (2025). The biggest part of the village is called Revišné.

== Population ==
Population statistic (10 years)
Year	1995	2005	2015	2025
Count	734	865	1197	1670
Difference		+17.84%	+38.38%	+39.51%

Population statistic
Year	2024	2025
Count	1616	1670
Difference		+3.34%

It has a population of 1670 people (31 December 2025).

=== Ethnicity ===
Census 2021 (1+ %)
Ethnicity	Number	Fraction
Slovak	1396	97.55%
Not found out	28	1.95%
Total	1431	

In year 2021 was 1431 people by ethnicity 1396 as Slovak, 28 as Not found out, 9 as Czech, 5 as Other, 4 as Polish, 3 as Russian, 1 as Italian, 1 as Serbian, 1 as Silesian, 1 as Rusyn and 1 as German.

Note on population: The difference values of population numbers in the table "Population statistic" and in the sections "Ethnicity" & "Religion" is caused by the use of various statistical methods.

=== Religion ===
Census 2021 (1+ %)
Religion	Number	Fraction
Roman Catholic Church	736	51.43%
Evangelical Church	420	29.35%
None	227	15.86%
Not found out	28	1.96%
Total	1431	

In year 2021 was 1431 people by religion 736 from Roman Catholic Church, 420 from Evangelical Church, 227 from None, 28 from Not found out, 4 from Greek Catholic Church, 4 from Ad hoc movements, 3 from Calvinist Church, 2 from Eastern Orthodox Church, 2 from Other, 2 from Buddhism, 1 from Paganism and natural spirituality, 1 from Other and not ascertained christian church and 1 from Apostolic Church.
