= Horná Lehota =

Horná Lehota may refer to several places in Slovakia.

- Horná Lehota, Brezno District
- Horná Lehota, Dolný Kubín District
