= Pokryváč =

- Municipality
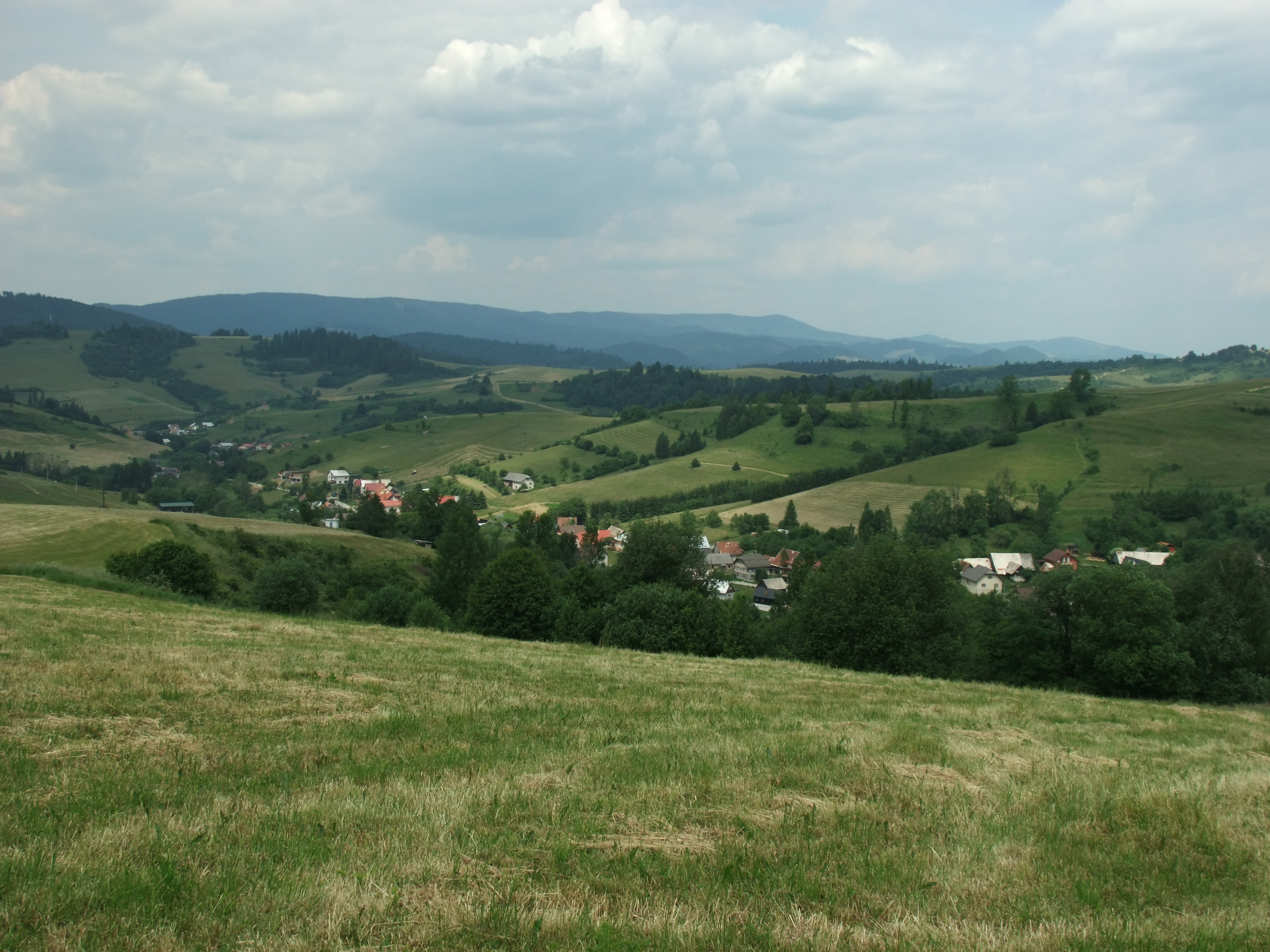

- Flag

- Location of Pokryváč in the Žilina Region Location of Pokryváč in Slovakia
- Coordinates: 49.20°N 19.40°E
- Country: Slovakia
- Region: Žilina Region
- District: Dolný Kubín District
- First mentioned: 1593

Area
  - Total: 3.90 km^{2} (1.51 sq mi)
- Elevation: 633 m (2,077 ft)

Population (2025)
  - Total: 187
- Time zone: UTC+1 (CET)
  - Summer (DST): UTC+2 (CEST)
- Postal code: 260 1
- Area code: +421 43
- Vehicle registration plate (until 2022): DK
- Website: www.obecpokryvac.sk

Pokryváč (Hungarian: Pokrivács) is a village and municipality in Dolný Kubín District in the Žilina Region of northern Slovakia.

== History ==
In historical records the village was first mentioned in 1593. Before the establishment of independent Czechoslovakia in 1918, Pokryváč was part of Árva County within the Kingdom of Hungary. From 1939 to 1945, it was part of the Slovak Republic.

== Geography ==
The municipality lies at an altitude of 633 metres (2,077 ft) and covers an area of 3.90 km^{2} (1.51 sq mi) (2025).

== Population ==
Population statistic (10 years)
Year	1995	2005	2015	2025
Count	178	186	174	187
Difference		+4.49%	−6.45%	+7.47%

Population statistic
Year	2024	2025
Count	185	187
Difference		+1.08%

It has a population of 187 people (31 December 2025).

=== Ethnicity ===
Census 2021 (1+ %)
Ethnicity	Number	Fraction
Slovak	171	96.61%
Not found out	5	2.82%
Total	177	

In year 2021 was 177 people by ethnicity 171 as Slovak, 5 as Not found out, 1 as Czech and 1 as Irish.

Note on population: The difference values of population numbers in the table "Population statistic" and in the sections "Ethnicity" & "Religion" is caused by the use of various statistical methods.

=== Religion ===
Census 2021 (1+ %)
Religion	Number	Fraction
Evangelical Church	121	68.36%
Roman Catholic Church	42	23.73%
None	9	5.08%
Not found out	5	2.82%
Total	177	

In year 2021 was 177 people by religion 121 from Evangelical Church, 42 from Roman Catholic Church, 9 from None and 5 from Not found out.
