= Malatiná =

Village in Slovakia

- Municipality
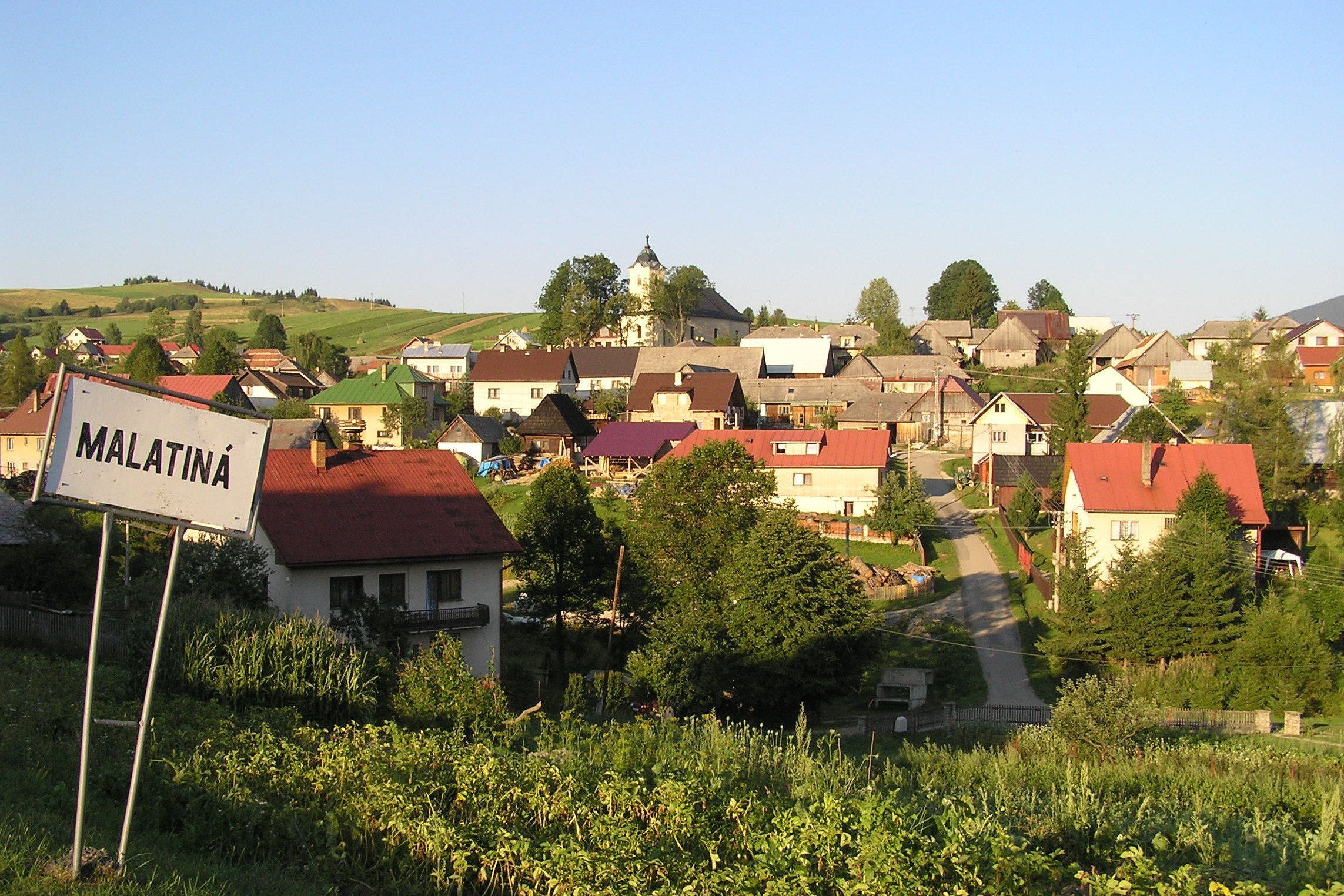

- Flag

- Location of Malatiná in the Žilina Region Location of Malatiná in Slovakia
- Coordinates: 49.18°N 19.43°E
- Country: Slovakia
- Region: Žilina Region
- District: Dolný Kubín District
- First mentioned: 1313

Area
  - Total: 19.14 km^{2} (7.39 sq mi)
- Elevation: 792 m (2,598 ft)

Population (2025)
  - Total: 823
- Time zone: UTC+1 (CET)
  - Summer (DST): UTC+2 (CEST)
- Postal code: 270 1
- Area code: +421 43
- Vehicle registration plate (until 2022): DK
- Website: www.obecmalatina.sk

Malatiná (Hungarian: Malatina) is a village and municipality in Dolný Kubín District in the Žilina Region of northern Slovakia.

== History ==
Before the establishment of independent Czechoslovakia in 1918, Malatiná was part of Árva County in the Kingdom of Hungary. From 1939 to 1945 it was part of the Slovak Republic.

== Geography ==
The municipality lies at an altitude of 792 metres (2,598 ft) and covers an area of 19.14 km^{2} (7.39 sq mi) (2025).

== Population ==
Population statistic (10 years)
Year	1995	2005	2015	2025
Count	857	829	810	823
Difference		−3.26%	−2.29%	+1.60%

Population statistic
Year	2024	2025
Count	819	823
Difference		+0.48%

It has a population of 823 people (31 December 2025).

=== Ethnicity ===
Census 2021 (1+ %)
Ethnicity	Number	Fraction
Slovak	806	96.64%
Not found out	26	3.11%
Total	834	

In year 2021 was 834 people by ethnicity 806 as Slovak, 26 as Not found out, 2 as Russian, 2 as German, 1 as Rusyn, 1 as Austrian and 1 as Other.

Note on population: The difference values of population numbers in the table "Population statistic" and in the sections "Ethnicity" & "Religion" is caused by the use of various statistical methods.

=== Religion ===
Census 2021 (1+ %)
Religion	Number	Fraction
Roman Catholic Church	772	92.57%
Not found out	26	3.12%
None	20	2.4%
Total	834	

In year 2021 was 834 people by religion 772 from Roman Catholic Church, 26 from Not found out, 20 from None, 7 from Greek Catholic Church, 7 from Evangelical Church, 1 from Eastern Orthodox Church and 1 from Other and not ascertained christian church.
