= Dlhá nad Oravou =

- Municipality
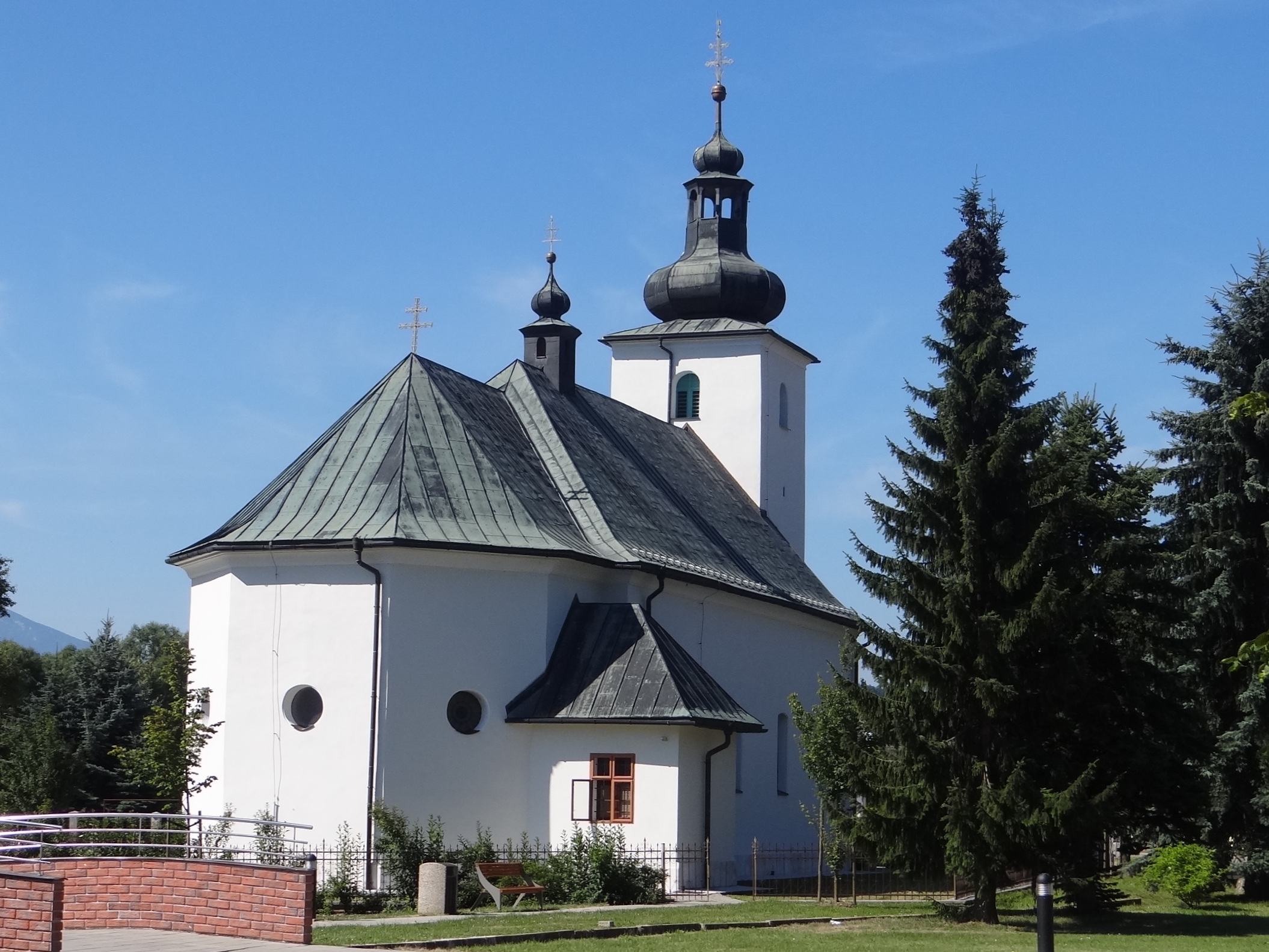

- Flag

- Location of Dlhá nad Oravou in the Žilina Region Location of Dlhá nad Oravou in Slovakia
- Coordinates: 49.27°N 19.45°E
- Country: Slovakia
- Region: Žilina Region
- District: Dolný Kubín District
- First mentioned: 1420

Area
  - Total: 24.31 km^{2} (9.39 sq mi)
- Elevation: 530 m (1,740 ft)

Population (2025)
  - Total: 1,431
- Time zone: UTC+1 (CET)
  - Summer (DST): UTC+2 (CEST)
- Postal code: 275 5
- Area code: +421 43
- Vehicle registration plate (until 2022): DK
- Website: www.dlhanadoravou.sk

Dlhá nad Oravou (Hungarian: Dluha) is a village and municipality in Dolný Kubín District in the Žilina Region of northern Slovakia.

== Geography ==
The municipality lies at an altitude of 530 metres (1,740 ft) and covers an area of 24.31 km^{2} (9.39 sq mi) (2025).

== History ==
Before the establishment of independent Czechoslovakia in 1918, Dlhá nad Oravou was part of Árva County within the Kingdom of Hungary. From 1939 to 1945, it was part of the Slovak Republic.

== Population ==
Population statistic (10 years)
Year	1995	2005	2015	2025
Count	1397	1392	1398	1431
Difference		−0.35%	+0.43%	+2.36%

Population statistic
Year	2024	2025
Count	1440	1431
Difference		−0.62%

It has a population of 1431 people (31 December 2025).

=== Ethnicity ===
Census 2021 (1+ %)
Ethnicity	Number	Fraction
Slovak	1413	98.6%
Not found out	23	1.6%
Total	1433	

In year 2021 was 1433 people by ethnicity 1413 as Slovak, 23 as Not found out, 4 as Czech, 4 as Other, 1 as Italian, 1 as Austrian and 1 as Hungarian.

Note on population: The difference values of population numbers in the table "Population statistic" and in the sections "Ethnicity" & "Religion" is caused by the use of various statistical methods.

=== Religion ===
Census 2021 (1+ %)
Religion	Number	Fraction
Roman Catholic Church	1339	93.44%
None	63	4.4%
Not found out	16	1.12%
Total	1433	

In year 2021 was 1433 people by religion 1339 from Roman Catholic Church, 63 from None, 16 from Not found out, 7 from Greek Catholic Church, 2 from Jehovah's Witnesses, 2 from Christian Congregations in Slovakia, 2 from Buddhism, 1 from Calvinist Church and 1 from Other.

== See also ==
- List of municipalities and towns in Slovakia

== Genealogical resources ==
The records for genealogical research are available at the state archive "Statny Archiv in Bytca, Slovakia"

- Roman Catholic church records (births/marriages/deaths): 1697-1909 (parish B)
