= Pribiš =

- Municipality
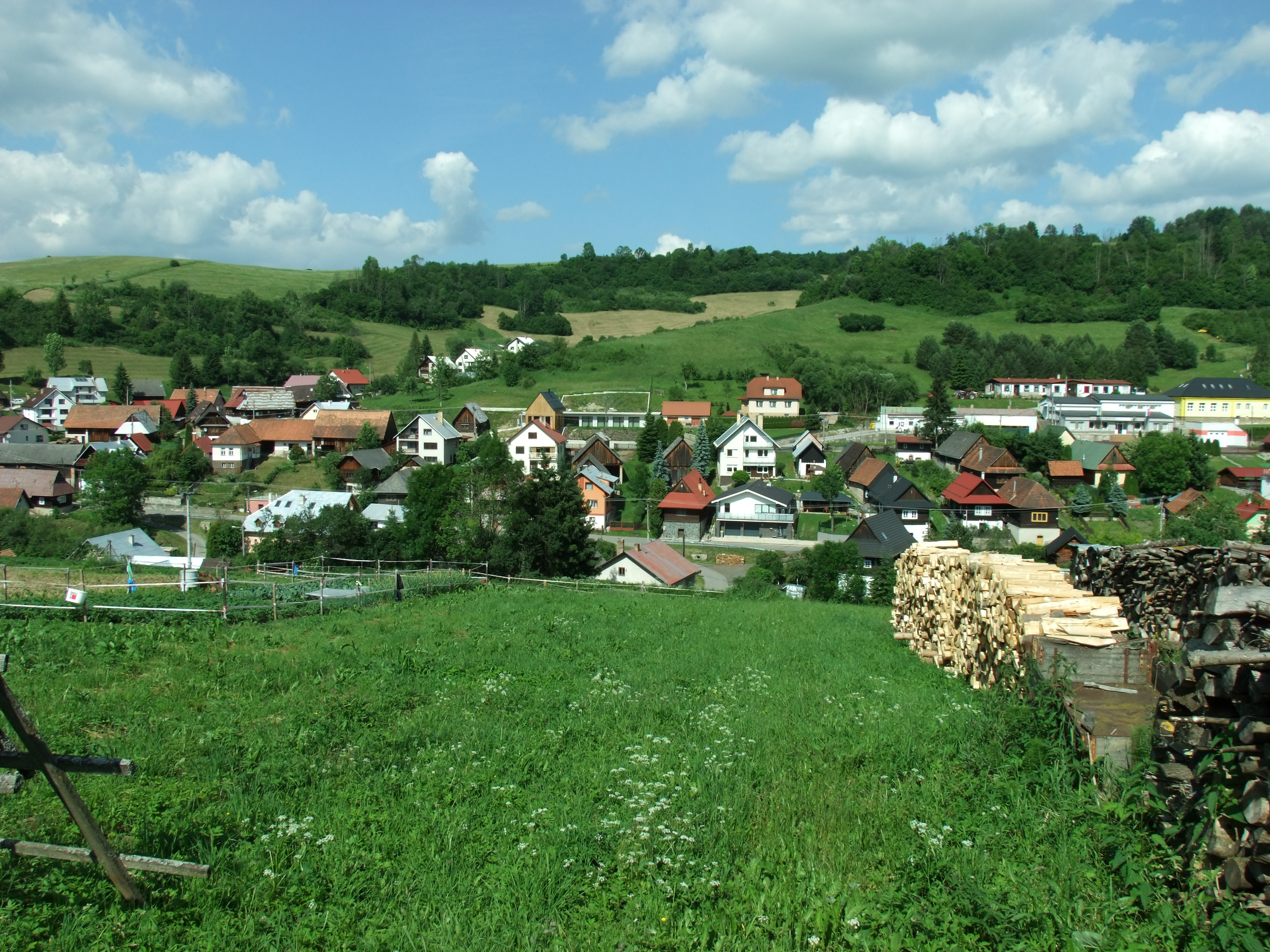

- Flag

- Location of Pribiš in the Žilina Region Location of Pribiš in Slovakia
- Coordinates: 49.22°N 19.40°E
- Country: Slovakia
- Region: Žilina Region
- District: Dolný Kubín District
- First mentioned: 1567

Area
  - Total: 8.40 km^{2} (3.24 sq mi)
- Elevation: 640 m (2,100 ft)

Population (2025)
  - Total: 467
- Time zone: UTC+1 (CET)
  - Summer (DST): UTC+2 (CEST)
- Postal code: 274 1
- Area code: +421 43
- Vehicle registration plate (until 2022): DK
- Website: www.pribis.sk

Pribiš (Hungarian: Pribis) is a village and municipality in Dolný Kubín District in the Zilina Region of northern Slovakia.

== History ==
In historical records the village was first mentioned in 1567. In 1675 it was given to Nikolaus (Miklos) Pribis who was knighted by Hapsburg Leopold I for his service in the war. In 1848 the house of Pribis lost ownership of the land when they fought with Lajos Kossuth during the Hungarian Revolution of 1848–1849. Before the establishment of independent Czechoslovakia in 1918, Pribiš was part of Árva County within the Kingdom of Hungary. From 1939 to 1945, it was part of the Slovak Republic.

== Geography ==
The municipality lies at an altitude of 640 metres (2,100 ft) and covers an area of 8.40 km^{2} (3.24 sq mi) (2025).

== Population ==
Population statistic (10 years)
Year	1995	2005	2015	2025
Count	477	469	449	467
Difference		−1.67%	−4.26%	+4.00%

Population statistic
Year	2024	2025
Count	468	467
Difference		−0.21%

It has a population of 467 people (31 December 2025).

=== Ethnicity ===
Census 2021 (1+ %)
Ethnicity	Number	Fraction
Slovak	472	98.74%
Not found out	6	1.25%
Total	478	

In year 2021 was 478 people by ethnicity 472 as Slovak, 6 as Not found out, 2 as Czech and 1 as Hungarian.

Note on population: The difference values of population numbers in the table "Population statistic" and in the sections "Ethnicity" & "Religion" is caused by the use of various statistical methods.

=== Religion ===
Census 2021 (1+ %)
Religion	Number	Fraction
Roman Catholic Church	462	96.65%
None	8	1.67%
Total	478	

In year 2021 was 478 people by religion 462 from Roman Catholic Church, 8 from None, 4 from Not found out, 2 from Evangelical Church, 1 from Christian Congregations in Slovakia and 1 from Greek Catholic Church.
