= Jasenová =

- Municipality
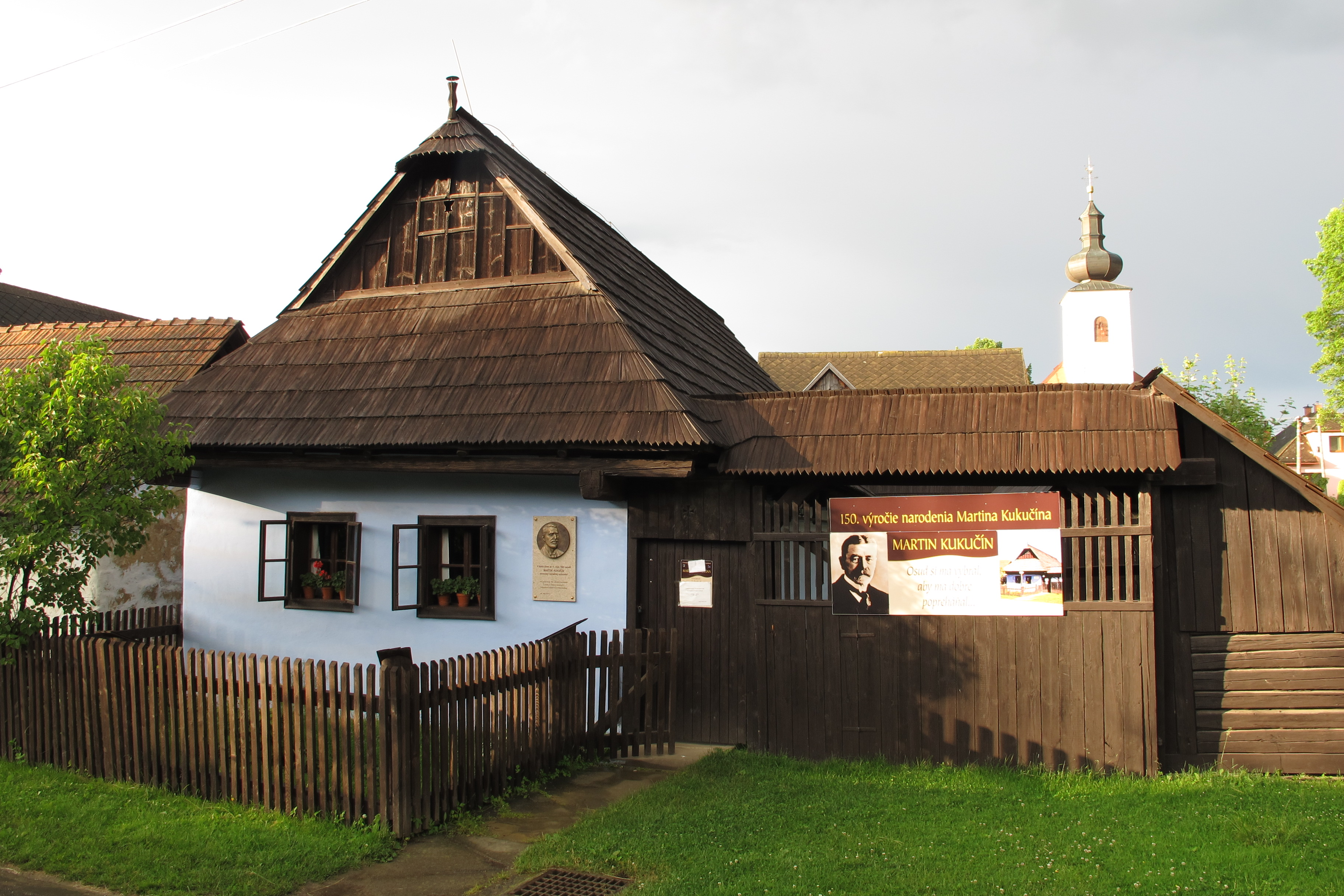
- Birthplace of Slovak writer Martin Kukučín

- Flag
- Interactive map of Jasenová
- Coordinates: 49.18°N 19.30°E
- Country: Slovakia
- Region: Žilina Region
- District: Dolný Kubín District
- First mentioned: 1320

Area
  - Total: 11.93 km^{2} (4.61 sq mi)
- Elevation: 538 m (1,765 ft)

Population (2025)
  - Total: 445
- Time zone: UTC+1 (CET)
  - Summer (DST): UTC+2 (CEST)
- Postal code: 270 1
- Area code: +421 43
- Vehicle registration plate (until 2022): DK
- Website: www.jasenova.sk

Jasenová (Hungarian: Jaszenova) is a village and municipality in Dolný Kubín District in the Zilina Region of northern Slovakia. It has population of 401 people.

Its name comes from the Slovak word Jaseň, which is a kind of tree often found in the area. There is a church built in 1836 and an old elementary school from the 19th century. A hill named Choč (altitude 1611 m) can be seen from the village.

== Geography ==
The municipality lies at an altitude of 538 metres (1,765 ft) and covers an area of 11.93 km^{2} (4.61 sq mi) (2025).

== History ==
Before the establishment of independent Czechoslovakia in 1918, Jasenová was part of Árva County within the Kingdom of Hungary. From 1939 to 1945, it was part of the Slovak Republic.

== Population ==
Population statistic (10 years)
Year	1995	2005	2015	2025
Count	386	397	415	445
Difference		+2.84%	+4.53%	+7.22%

Population statistic
Year	2024	2025
Count	434	445
Difference		+2.53%

It has a population of 445 people (31 December 2025).

=== Ethnicity ===
Census 2021 (1+ %)
Ethnicity	Number	Fraction
Slovak	419	98.58%
Total	425	

In year 2021 was 425 people by ethnicity 419 as Slovak, 4 as Not found out, 1 as Jewish, 1 as German and 1 as Other.

Note on population: The difference values of population numbers in the table "Population statistic" and in the sections "Ethnicity" & "Religion" is caused by the use of various statistical methods.

=== Religion ===
Census 2021 (1+ %)
Religion	Number	Fraction
Evangelical Church	305	71.76%
Roman Catholic Church	72	16.94%
None	36	8.47%
Not found out	8	1.88%
Total	425	

In year 2021 was 425 people by religion 305 from Evangelical Church, 72 from Roman Catholic Church, 36 from None, 8 from Not found out, 1 from Other and not ascertained christian church, 1 from Other, 1 from Hinduism and 1 from Buddhism.

== Famous people ==
- Martin Kukučín, writer

== See also ==
- List of municipalities and towns in Slovakia

== Genealogical resources ==
The records for genealogical research are available at the state archive "Statny Archiv in Bytca, Slovakia"

- Roman Catholic church records (births/marriages/deaths): 1672-1898 (parish B)
- Lutheran church records (births/marriages/deaths): 1786-1949 (parish A)
