= Horná Lehota, Dolný Kubín District =

Horná Lehota
- Municipality
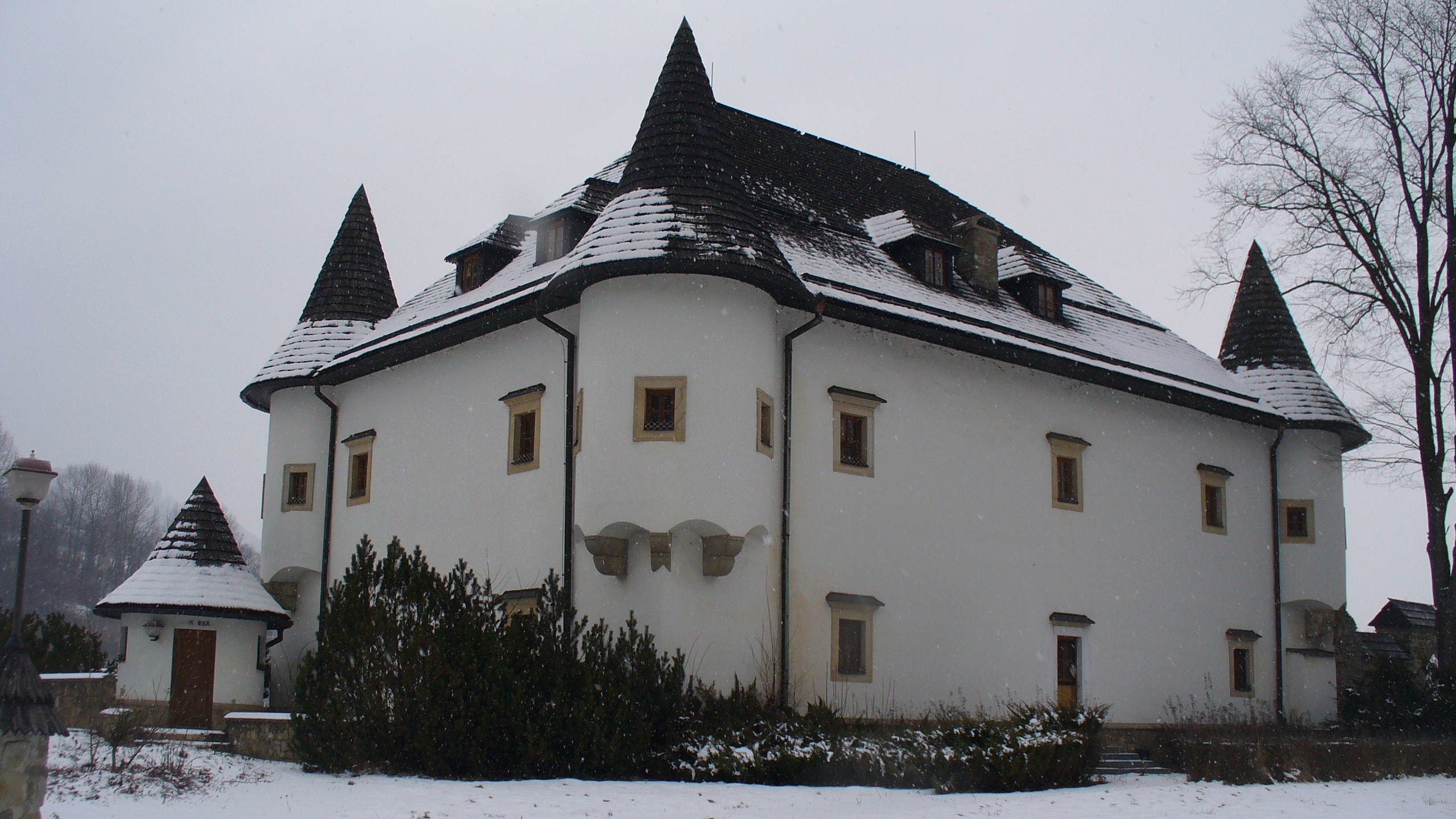

- Flag

- Location of Horná Lehota in the Žilina Region Location of Horná Lehota in Slovakia
- Coordinates: 49°15′17″N 19°24′16″E
- Country: Slovakia
- Region: Žilina Region
- District: Dolný Kubín District
- First mentioned: 1420

Area
  - Total: 15.33 km^{2} (5.92 sq mi)
- Elevation: 517 m (1,696 ft)

Population (2025)
  - Total: 591
- Time zone: UTC+1 (CET)
  - Summer (DST): UTC+2 (CEST)
- Postal code: 274 1
- Area code: +421 43
- Vehicle registration plate (until 2022): DK
- Website: hornalehota.sk

Horná Lehota (Hungarian: Felsőlehota) is a village and municipality in Dolný Kubín District in the Žilina Region of northern Slovakia.

== History ==
Before the establishment of independent Czechoslovakia in 1918, Horná Lehota was part of Árva County within the Kingdom of Hungary. From 1939 to 1945, it was part of the Slovak Republic.

== Population ==
Population statistic (10 years)
Year	1995	2005	2015	2025
Count	524	520	566	591
Difference		−0.76%	+8.84%	+4.41%

Population statistic
Year	2024	2025
Count	598	591
Difference		−1.17%

It has a population of 591 people (31 December 2025).

=== Ethnicity ===
Census 2021 (1+ %)
Ethnicity	Number	Fraction
Slovak	549	98.56%
Not found out	6	1.07%
Total	557	

In year 2021 was 557 people by ethnicity 549 as Slovak, 6 as Not found out, 2 as Czech, 2 as Polish, 1 as Russian, 1 as Hungarian and 1 as Other.

Note on population: The difference values of population numbers in the table "Population statistic" and in the sections "Ethnicity" & "Religion" is caused by the use of various statistical methods.

=== Religion ===
Census 2021 (1+ %)
Religion	Number	Fraction
Roman Catholic Church	490	87.97%
None	48	8.62%
Other	6	1.08%
Total	557	

In year 2021 was 557 people by religion 490 from Roman Catholic Church, 48 from None, 6 from Other, 4 from Not found out, 4 from Evangelical Church, 1 from Calvinist Church, 1 from Eastern Orthodox Church, 1 from Christian Congregations in Slovakia, 1 from Greek Catholic Church and 1 from Ad hoc movements.

== See also ==
- List of municipalities and towns in Slovakia

== Genealogical resources ==
The records for genealogical research are available at the state archive "Statny Archiv in Bytca, Slovakia"

- Roman Catholic church records (births/marriages/deaths): 1697-1909 (parish B)
