= Orava Castle =

Castle in Slovakia

Coordinates: 49°15′42″N 19°21′29″E

- Oravský hrad
- Oravský Podzámok; Slovakia
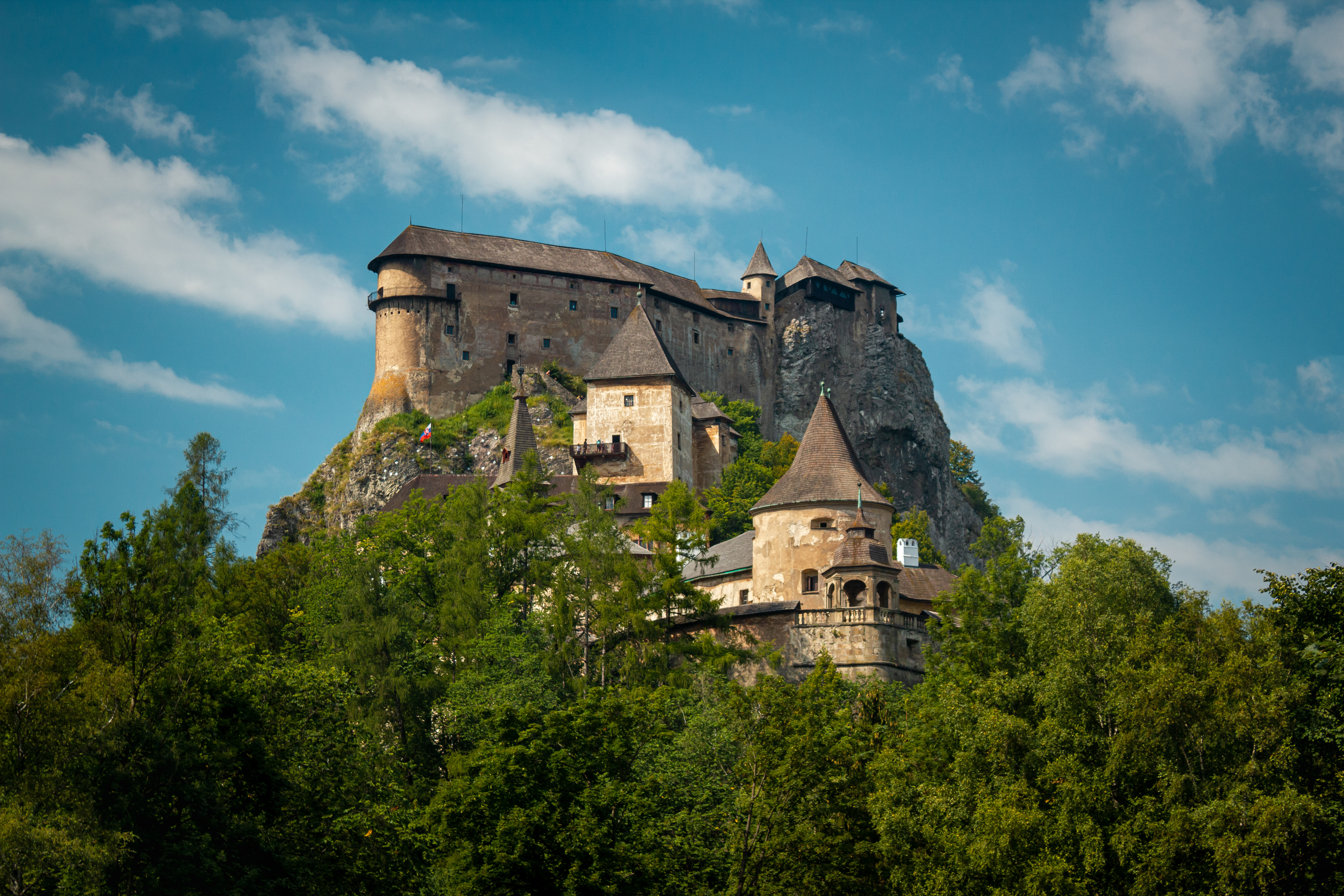
- Orava Castle in August 2020

Site information
- Type: Castle
- Owner: Slovakia
- Controlled by: Slovakia
- Open to the public: Yes

Location
- Location within Slovakia
- Location within Slovakia

Site history
- Built: 13th–17th century

Orava Castle (Slovak: Oravský hrad, Hungarian: Árva vára) is a castle situated on a high rock above Orava river in the village of Oravský Podzámok, Slovakia. The castle was built in the Kingdom of Hungary, with the oldest parts being built in the thirteenth century and the most recent parts in the early seventeenth century. Many scenes of the 1922 film Nosferatu were filmed here, the castle representing Count Orlok's Transylvanian castle.

Orava Castle stands on the site of an old wooden fortification, built after the Mongol invasion of Hungary of 1241. Its history follows a familiar pattern of construction, destruction, reconstruction, fire, various ownerships and territorial squabbles. The original design was in Romanesque and Gothic style; it was later reconstructed as a Renaissance and Neo-Gothic structure, hugging the shape of the 520-metre spur on which it perches.

The mining magnates Thurzo family, who took charge in the mid-16th century, were responsible for a great deal of rebuilding work, although its present form was not finalised until 1611. It burned down again in 1800, after which it was no longer used as a residence. After a period of dilapidation dating until World War II, the castle became a national monument.

== Origins ==
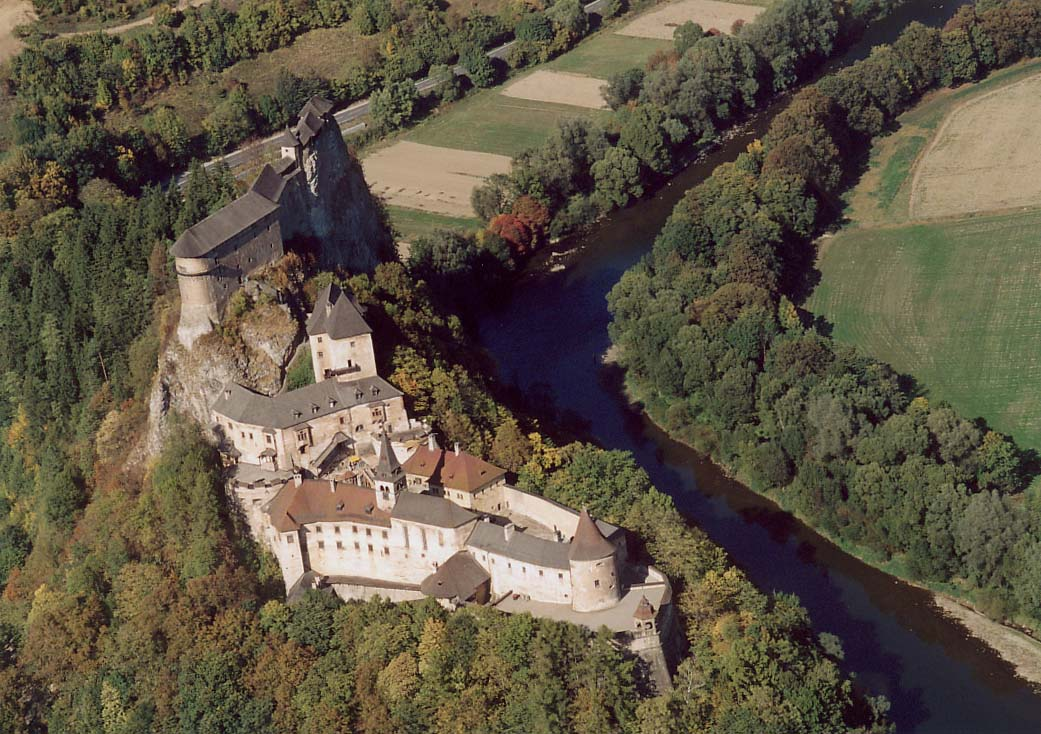
Orava Castle from above

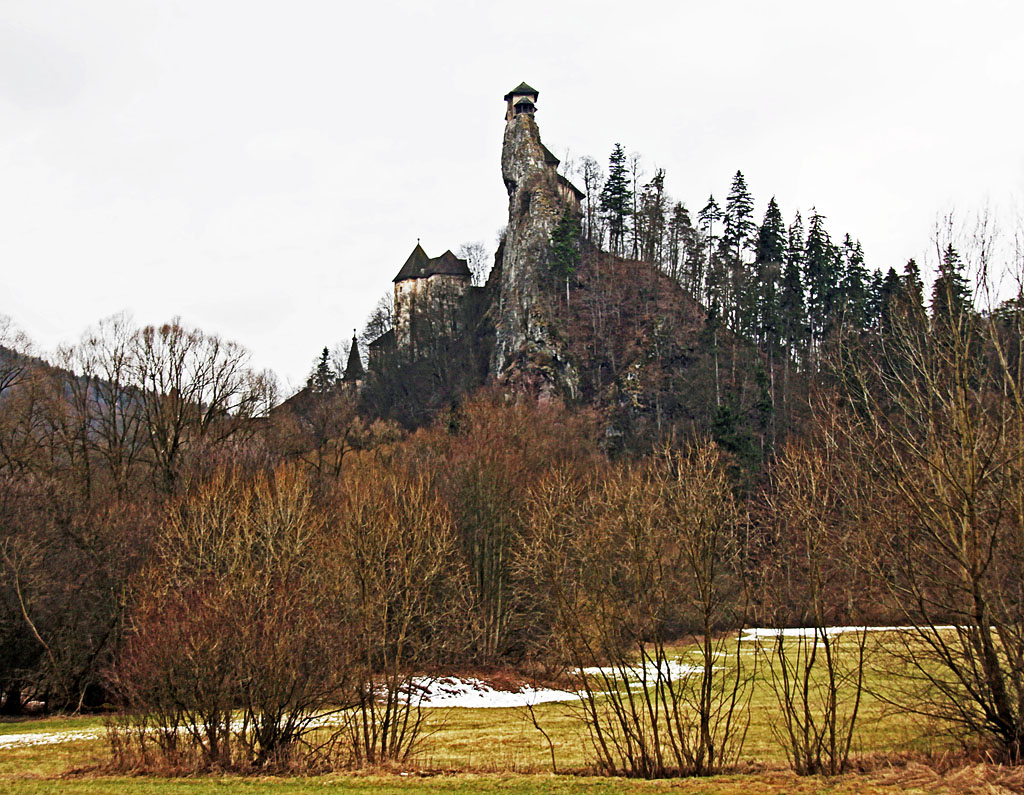
Orava castle, seen from the N-NE

The natural rock formation known as "castle cliff" – a limestone spur 112 meters (367 ft) high, surrounded by the river Orava and its right tributary stream Račová – has been inhabited since primeval times. During its history a wooden rampart became a strong walled castle of which the first written record dates back to 1267. At that time only the ground floor was built of stone, while the upper floors were made of wood.

In 1370 as part of the Hungarian Kingdom the castle became the center of Árva county. A tetrahedral multi-story tower was built here in the 14th century, probably on older foundations, as a donjon – the place of "last defense" within the castle. After 1474, King Matthias Corvinus gave orders to build a square and a residence-wing in the Middle Castle. The buildings were situated in front of the castle. In 1534 John of Dubovec obtained the castle and became head of the county. He started to rebuild the castle and to make new fortifications. He ordered the building of a half-round tower in the Upper Castle that in 1539 was followed by two large round fortifications for cannons in the Middle Castle. The middle platform was also configured for cannon firing. In the years 1539 to 1543 John of Dubovec built a five-story palace in the empty space between the tower and the stone wall of the Upper Castle. The threat of Ottoman invasion was the reason for building these new fortifications. A new gate with a ditch and drawbridge in the Lower Castle was completed in 1543. The Tower of the Archives was built against the castle walls.

== 16th–18th centuries ==
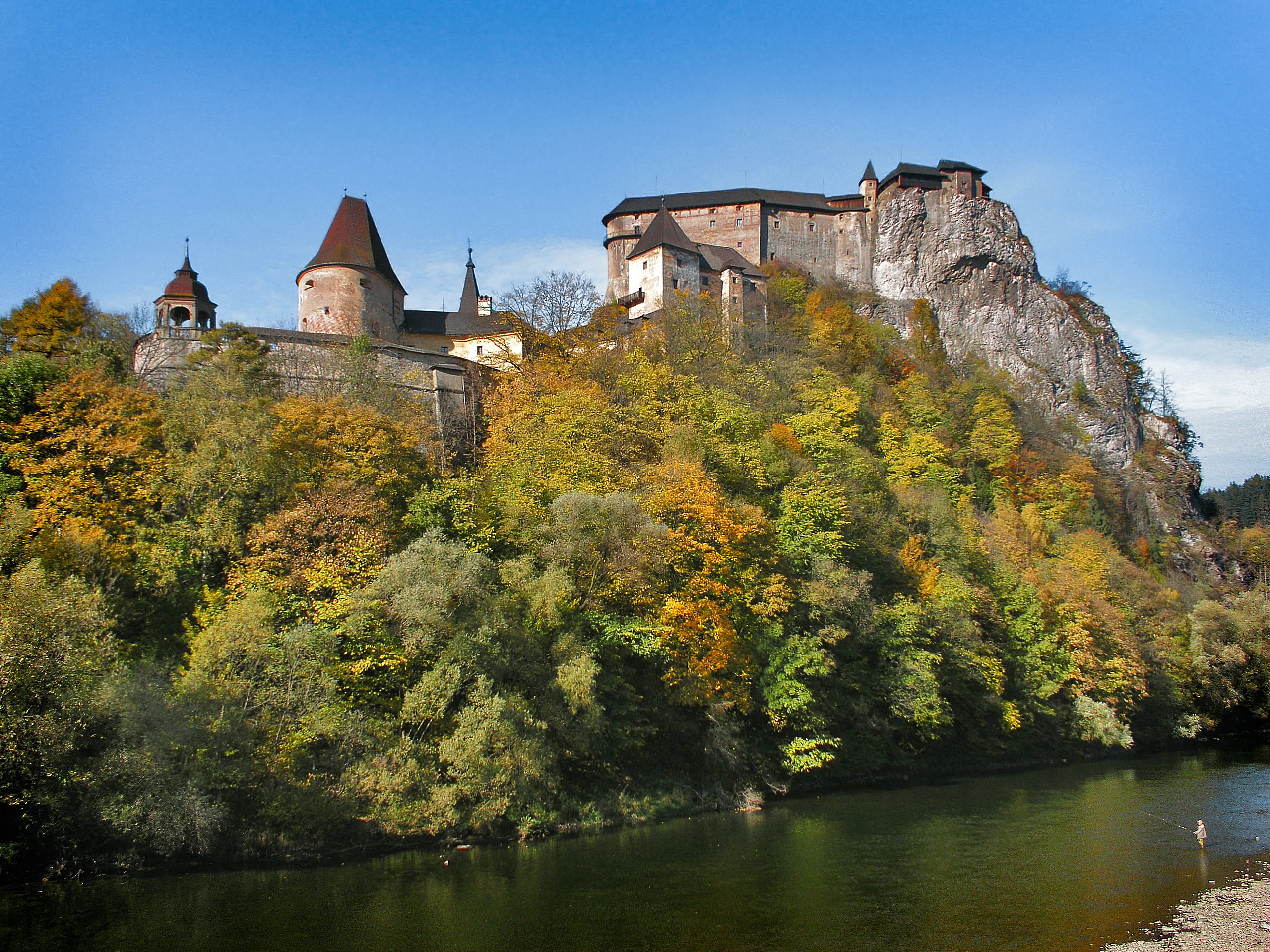
View of the Castle

After the death of John of Dubovec, his heirs quarreled over the inheritance and the situation became so bad that the castle even became a store-house. It was paid for by the mine owner Ferenc Thurzó. A lot of building activity took place at the castle following this time period. The wooden stairs in the Upper Castle were replaced by stone stairs. The same was done to the stairs between the Middle and the Upper Castle with the drawbridge. A cellar was also dug out of the stone of the castle court and a single-story residence-wing was built in the lower castle near the west wall.

György Thurzó also carried out some important repairs. One of the first was the building of a tunnel between both castle gates, above which was formed a large terrace. After this was all done he moved the living-quarters and the building of the chapel started using parts of some old architecture. The interior furnishing of the chapel was later arranged in a taste which suited the new owners of the castle. One of the most well-known features is the Renaissance grave tomb of György Thurzó from the beginning of the 17th century and the Baroque altar from 1751–1752.

== Disuse, fire and the museum ==
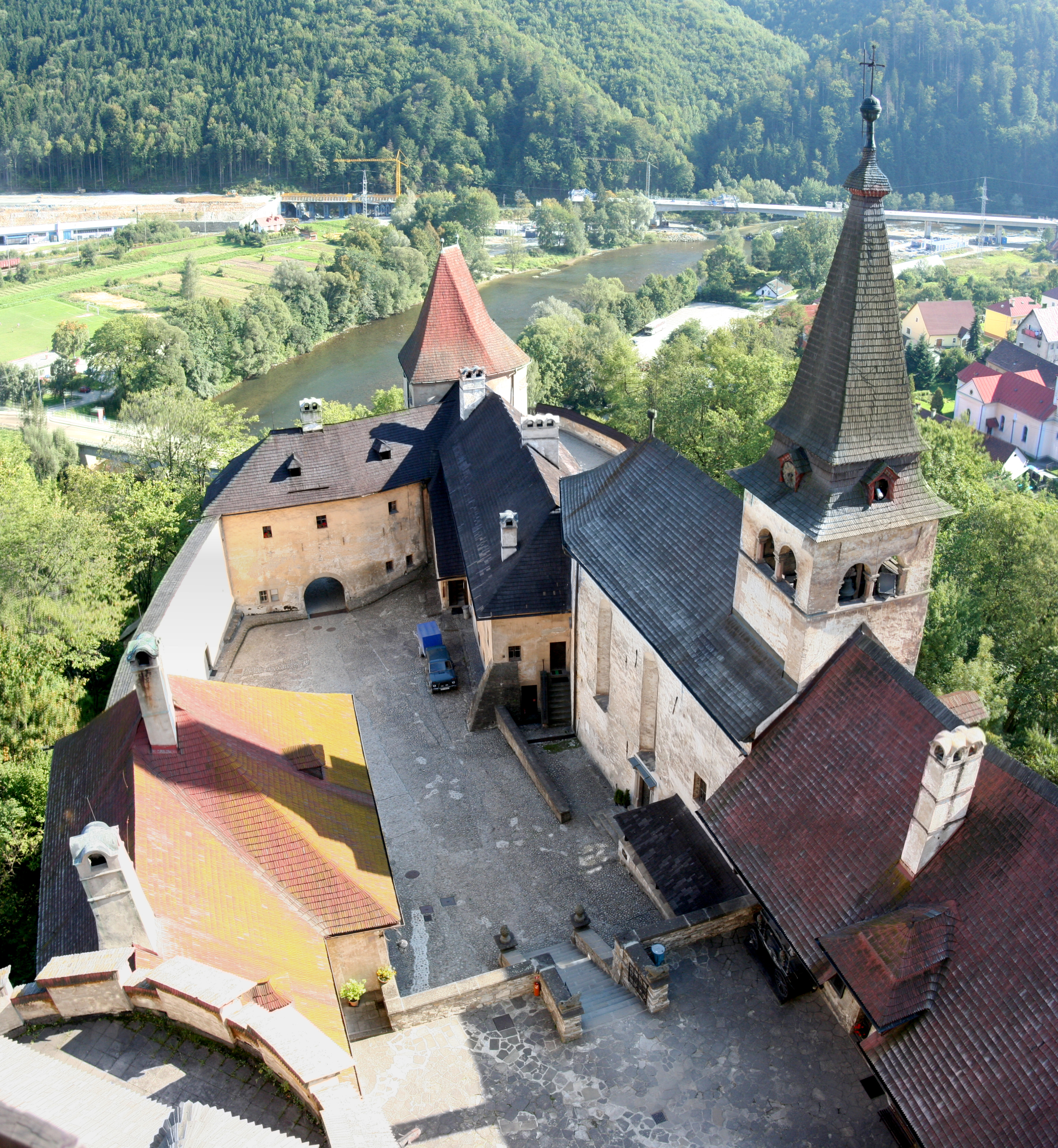
View of the lower castle

After the death of Erzsébet Czobor, the widow of György Thurzó, the castle became the property of Thurzó's daughters, who entrusted its administration to an elected administrator. Because of changes in politics, society and the economy, the castle gradually lost its important functions. Only a few clerks stayed on and the uninhabited and disused parts of the castle gradually deteriorated. The greatest catastrophe affected the castle in 1800, when a gigantic fire destroyed all the wooden parts of the castle. Some objects from the Lower Castle were recovered after the fire because they had been covered by the roof shingles. However, the objects from the Middle and Upper Castle were not reconstructed until 1861.

To find a use for the historical object, Ödön Zichy, the administrator of the property (as administrator of Veszprém County), organized a foundation which had the aim of founding a regional museum of Orava. The first exhibition took place at the Thurzo Palace in 1868. Nowadays, the Orava Museum is one of the oldest in Slovakia. Its most attractive expositions are those of the Castle Chapel, the Knights' Room, and several rooms with period-style furnishing. Further highlights include the Painting Gallery, the Weapon room, and the scientific, ethnographic and archaeological collections.

== Cultural references ==
Many scenes of the 1922 film Nosferatu were filmed here, the castle representing Count Orlok's Transylvanian castle; In their 2020 TV adaptation of Bram Stoker's novel Dracula, Mark Gatiss and Steven Moffat also used Orava as their Castle Dracula.

Orava Castle served as the filming location for the 1972 film, Adam Šangala, as well as for the episode "Germany, Mid-August 1916" of The Young Indiana Jones Chronicles and the 2000 film Dragonheart: A New Beginning.

It was also used by the Polish video game company CD Projekt as inspiration for the fictional Kaer Morhen, a fortress for the witchers of the Wolf School, in the video game adaptations of Andrzej Sapkowski's The Witcher book series.

Van Helsing's season 5 was filmed on location.
