= Oravský Podzámok =

- Municipality
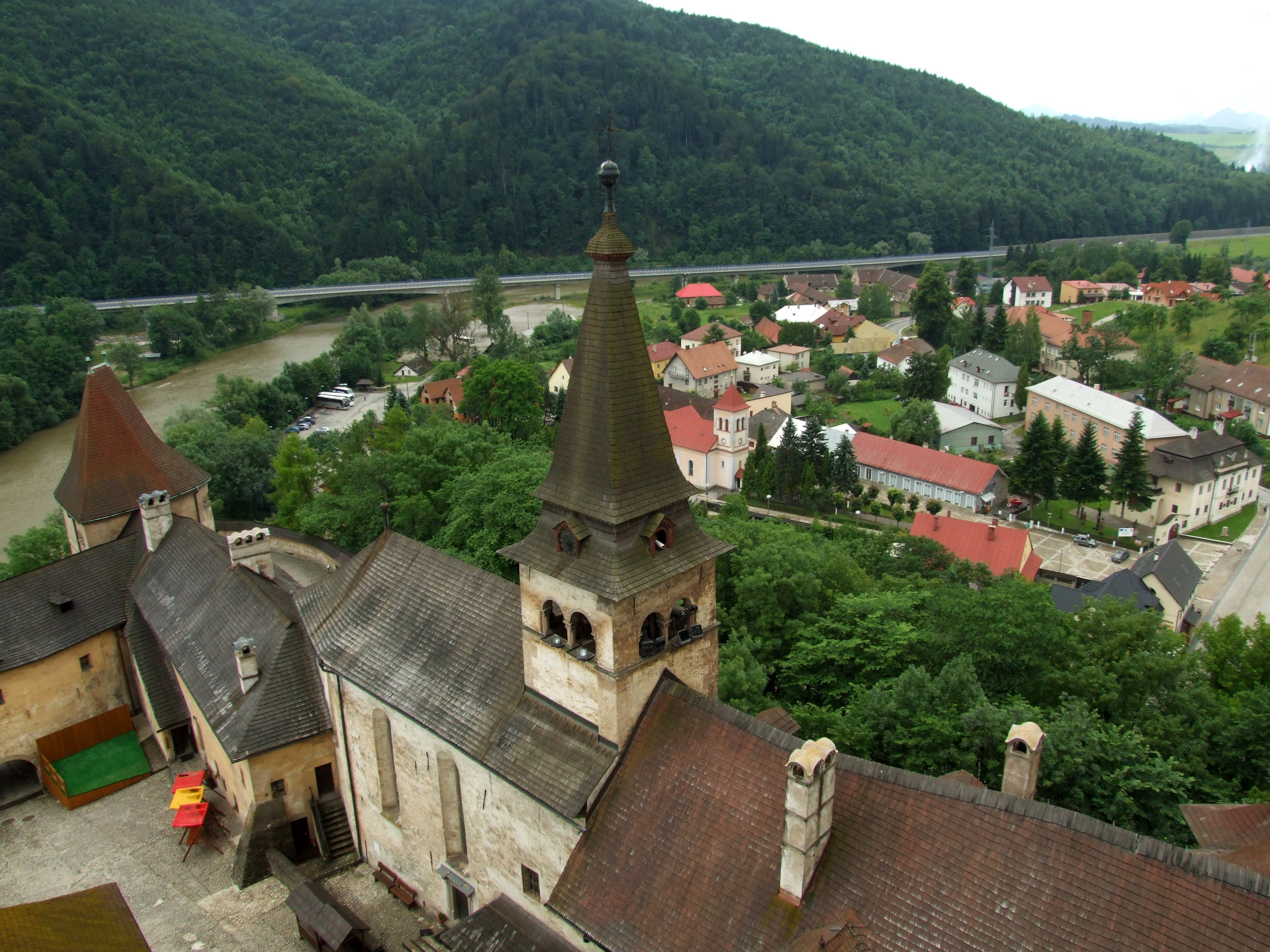
- View of the village from Orava Castle

- Flag Coat of arms

- Location of Oravský Podzámok in the Žilina Region Location of Oravský Podzámok in Slovakia
- Coordinates: 49.27°N 19.37°E
- Country: Slovakia
- Region: Žilina Region
- District: Dolný Kubín District
- First mentioned: 1267

Area
  - Total: 35.28 km^{2} (13.62 sq mi)
- Elevation: 505 m (1,657 ft)

Population (2025)
  - Total: 1,362
- Time zone: UTC+1 (CET)
  - Summer (DST): UTC+2 (CEST)
- Postal code: 274 1
- Area code: +421 43
- Vehicle registration plate (until 2022): DK
- Website: www.oravskypodzamok.sk

Oravský Podzámok (Hungarian: Árvaváralja) is a village and municipality in Dolný Kubín District in the Zilina Region of northern Slovakia. Orava Castle is located in the village.

The village is located at 508 m (1677 ft) and has a population of 1331 inhabitants.

Factory OFZ, Istebné, the largest Slovak producer of ferroalloys, is located in Oravský Podzámok.

== Geography ==
The municipality lies at an altitude of 505 metres (1,657 ft) and covers an area of 35.28 km^{2} (13.62 sq mi) (2025).

== History ==
Before the establishment of independent Czechoslovakia in 1918, Oravský Podzámok was part of Árva County within the Kingdom of Hungary. From 1939 to 1945, it was part of the Slovak Republic.

== Population ==
Population statistic (10 years)
Year	1995	2005	2015	2025
Count	1288	1315	1345	1362
Difference		+2.09%	+2.28%	+1.26%

Population statistic
Year	2024	2025
Count	1354	1362
Difference		+0.59%

It has a population of 1362 people (31 December 2025).

=== Ethnicity ===
Census 2021 (1+ %)
Ethnicity	Number	Fraction
Slovak	1324	97.85%
Not found out	30	2.21%
Total	1353	

In year 2021 was 1353 people by ethnicity 1324 as Slovak, 30 as Not found out, 5 as Czech, 3 as Russian, 3 as Croatian, 2 as Polish, 2 as Other, 1 as Romani, 1 as German and 1 as Hungarian.

Note on population: The difference values of population numbers in the table "Population statistic" and in the sections "Ethnicity" & "Religion" is caused by the use of various statistical methods.

=== Religion ===
Census 2021 (1+ %)
Religion	Number	Fraction
Roman Catholic Church	1145	84.63%
None	156	11.53%
Not found out	18	1.33%
Total	1353	

In year 2021 was 1353 people by religion 1145 from Roman Catholic Church, 156 from None, 18 from Not found out, 13 from Evangelical Church, 6 from Greek Catholic Church, 4 from Other and not ascertained christian church, 3 from Other, 2 from Christian Congregations in Slovakia, 2 from Buddhism, 2 from Ad hoc movements, 1 from Calvinist Church and 1 from Hinduism.

== Twin towns – sister cities ==
Oravský Podzámok is twinned with:

- Lipinki, Poland
- Vodňany, Czech Republic
- Włodowice, Poland
