= Pucov, Dolný Kubín District =

Municipality of Slovakia

Pucov
- Municipality
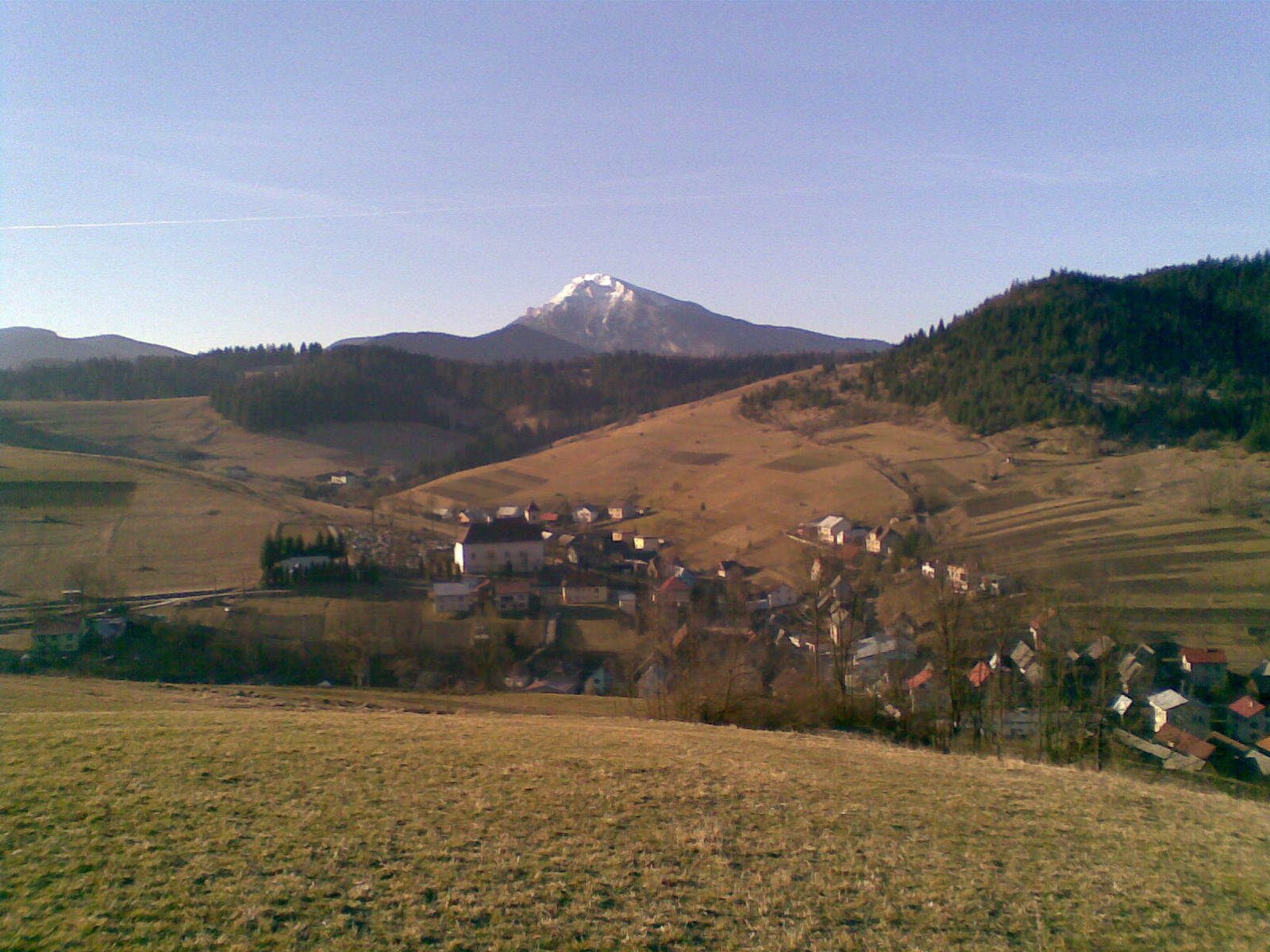

- Flag

- Location of Pucov in the Žilina Region Location of Pucov in Slovakia
- Coordinates: 49°13′N 19°23′E
- Country: Slovakia
- Region: Žilina Region
- District: Dolný Kubín District
- First mentioned: 1550

Area
  - Total: 9.94 km^{2} (3.84 sq mi)
- Elevation: 573 m (1,880 ft)

Population (2025)
  - Total: 896
- Time zone: UTC+1 (CET)
  - Summer (DST): UTC+2 (CEST)
- Postal code: 260 1
- Area code: +421 43
- Vehicle registration plate (until 2022): DK
- Website: www.pucov.sk

Pucov (Hungarian: Pucó) is a village and municipality in Dolný Kubín District in the Zilina Region of northern Slovakia. It is situated at 579 m (1900 ft) and has about 739 inhabitants.

== History ==
Before the establishment of independent Czechoslovakia in 1918, Pucov was part of Árva County within the Kingdom of Hungary. From 1939 to 1945, it was part of the Slovak Republic.

== Population ==
Population statistic (10 years)
Year	1995	2005	2015	2025
Count	685	750	840	896
Difference		+9.48%	+12%	+6.66%

Population statistic
Year	2024	2025
Count	895	896
Difference		+0.11%

It has a population of 896 people (31 December 2025).

=== Ethnicity ===
Census 2021 (1+ %)
Ethnicity	Number	Fraction
Slovak	888	98.66%
Not found out	14	1.55%
Total	900	

In year 2021 was 900 people by ethnicity 888 as Slovak, 14 as Not found out, 7 as Other, 2 as Romani, 2 as German, 2 as English, 1 as Czech, 1 as Austrian, 1 as Polish and 1 as Hungarian.

Note on population: The difference values of population numbers in the table "Population statistic" and in the sections "Ethnicity" & "Religion" is caused by the use of various statistical methods.

=== Religion ===
Census 2021 (1+ %)
Religion	Number	Fraction
Roman Catholic Church	821	91.22%
None	43	4.78%
Evangelical Church	11	1.22%
Not found out	10	1.11%
Total	900	

In year 2021 was 900 people by religion 821 from Roman Catholic Church, 43 from None, 11 from Evangelical Church, 10 from Not found out, 7 from Greek Catholic Church, 5 from Other, 2 from Paganism and natural spirituality and 1 from Other and not ascertained christian church.
