= Dolný Kubín District =

Coordinates: 49°12′32″N 19°17′43″E

- District
- Country: Slovakia
- Region (kraj): Žilina Region
- Cultural region: Orava
- Seat: Dolný Kubín

Area
  - Total: 491.83 km^{2} (189.90 sq mi)

Population (2025)
  - Total: 38,608
- Time zone: UTC+1 (CET)
  - Summer (DST): UTC+2 (CEST)
- Telephone prefix: 043
- Vehicle registration plate (until 2022): DK
- Municipalities: 24

Dolný Kubín District (okres Dolný Kubín) is a district in the Žilina Region of central Slovakia. The district is located in a hilly area north of the Malá Fatra and Choč mountain ranges. The engineering, electrical engineering, metallurgy and wood processing industries represent the core of this district's economy. The district seat is its largest town Dolný Kubín.

== Population ==
Population statistic (10 years)
Year	1995	2005	2015	2025
Count	38,690	39,453	39,509	38,608
Difference		+1.97%	+0.14%	−2.28%

Population statistic
Year	2024	2025
Count	38,726	38,608
Difference		−0.30%

It has a population of 38,608 people (31 December 2025).

Historical population
Year	Pop.	±%
1970	29,523	—
1980	33,339	+12.9%
1991	37,431	+12.3%
2001	39,364	+5.2%
2011	39,520	+0.4%
2021	39,026	−1.2%
Source: Statistical Office of the Slovak Republic

=== Ethnicity ===
Census 2021 (1+ %)
Ethnicity	Number	Fraction
Slovak	37,661	94.91%
Not found out	1199	3.02%
Total	39,680	

In year 2021 was 39,680 people by ethnicity 37,661 as Slovak, 1199 as Not found out, 264 as Czech, 123 as Other, 79 as Romani, 61 as Polish, 49 as Russian, 40 as Hungarian, 32 as Ukrainian, 27 as German, 25 as Rusyn, 16 as English, 14 as Italian, 14 as Croatian, 12 as French, 8 as Chinese, 8 as Canadian, 7 as Irish, 7 as Moravian, 6 as Serbian, 6 as Austrian, 5 as Jewish, 5 as Vietnamese, 2 as Turkish, 2 as Silesian, 2 as Romanian, 2 as Greek, 2 as Albanian, 1 as Iranian and 1 as Bulgarian.

Note on population: The difference values of population numbers in the table "Population statistic" and in the sections "Ethnicity" & "Religion" is caused by the use of various statistical methods.

=== Religion ===
Census 2021 (1+ %)
Religion	Number	Fraction
Roman Catholic Church	24,539	62.88%
Evangelical Church	6344	16.26%
None	5942	15.23%
Not found out	1414	3.62%
Total	39,026	

In year 2021 was 39,026 people by religion 24,539 from Roman Catholic Church, 6344 from Evangelical Church, 5942 from None, 1414 from Not found out, 211 from Greek Catholic Church, 111 from Ad hoc movements, 98 from Other, 68 from Christian Congregations in Slovakia, 56 from Other and not ascertained christian church, 47 from Buddhism, 42 from Eastern Orthodox Church, 24 from Jehovah's Witnesses, 23 from Islam, 22 from Calvinist Church, 20 from Paganism and natural spirituality, 19 from United Methodist Church, 10 from Seventh-day Adventist Church, 7 from Hinduism, 6 from Old Catholic Church, 6 from Church of the Brethren, 6 from Baptists Church, 5 from Czechoslovak Hussite Church, 4 from Apostolic Church, 1 from Jewish community and 1 from New Apostolic Church.

== Municipalities ==
Municipality	Area [km^{2}]	Population
Bziny	5.84	591
Dlhá nad Oravou	24.31	1,431
Dolný Kubín	55.05	17,378
Horná Lehota	15.33	591
Chlebnice	25.30	1,611
Istebné	11.29	1,275
Jasenová	11.93	445
Kraľovany	18.80	424
Krivá	18.87	804
Leštiny	6.93	313
Malatiná	19.14	823
Medzibrodie nad Oravou	6.57	634
Oravská Poruba	13.19	1,104
Oravský Podzámok	35.28	1,362
Osádka	4.08	170
Párnica	50.40	987
Pokryváč	3.90	187
Pribiš	8.40	467
Pucov	9.94	896
Sedliacka Dubová	11.64	534
Veličná	29.30	1,670
Vyšný Kubín	12.74	863
Zázrivá	67.24	2,430
Žaškov	24.72	1,618

Population and area values are current for year 2025.
