= Zázrivá =

- Municipality
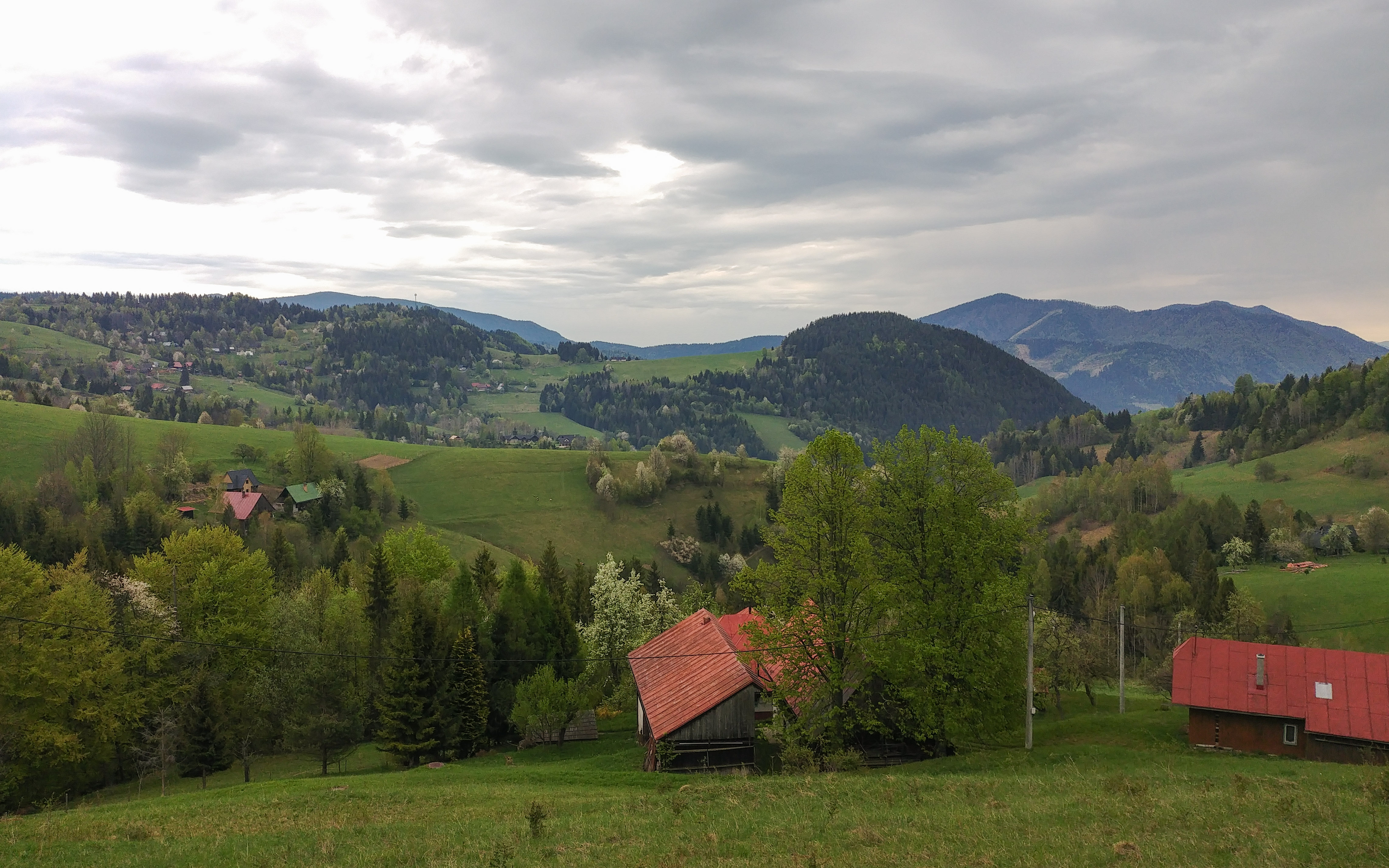

- Flag Coat of arms

- Location of Zázrivá in the Žilina Region Location of Zázrivá in Slovakia
- Coordinates: 49.27°N 19.15°E
- Country: Slovakia
- Region: Žilina Region
- District: Dolný Kubín District
- First mentioned: 1556

Government
  - Mayor: Matúš Mních

Area
  - Total: 67.24 km^{2} (25.96 sq mi)
- Elevation: 669 m (2,195 ft)

Population (2025)
  - Total: 2,430
- Time zone: UTC+1 (CET)
  - Summer (DST): UTC+2 (CEST)
- Postal code: 270 5
- Area code: +421 43
- Vehicle registration plate (until 2022): DK
- Website: zazriva.com

Zázrivá (Hungarian: Zázriva) is a village and municipality in Dolný Kubín District in the Žilina Region of northern Slovakia. It is located in the Orava region, around 35 km from Žilina and 20 km from Dolný Kubín. It was first mentioned in 1556.

== Geography ==
The municipality lies at an altitude of 669 metres (2,195 ft) and covers an area of 67.24 km^{2} (25.96 sq mi) (2025).

== Etymology ==
The name means 'envied' (i.e., a village envied by others).

== History ==
Before the establishment of independent Czechoslovakia in 1918, Zázrivá was part of Árva County within the Kingdom of Hungary. From 1939 to 1945, it was part of the Slovak Republic.

== Population ==
Population statistic (10 years)
Year	1995	2005	2015	2025
Count	2878	2785	2684	2430
Difference		−3.23%	−3.62%	−9.46%

Population statistic
Year	2024	2025
Count	2459	2430
Difference		−1.17%

It has a population of 2430 people (31 December 2025).

=== Ethnicity ===
Census 2021 (1+ %)
Ethnicity	Number	Fraction
Slovak	2451	96.04%
Not found out	102	3.99%
Total	2552	

In year 2021 was 2552 people by ethnicity 2451 as Slovak, 102 as Not found out, 8 as Czech, 8 as Russian, 6 as Other, 5 as Rusyn, 5 as German, 3 as Italian, 3 as English, 1 as Romanian, 1 as Hungarian and 1 as Croatian.

Note on population: The difference values of population numbers in the table "Population statistic" and in the sections "Ethnicity" & "Religion" is caused by the use of various statistical methods.

=== Religion ===
Census 2021 (1+ %)
Religion	Number	Fraction
Roman Catholic Church	2090	81.9%
None	273	10.7%
Not found out	92	3.61%
Evangelical Church	46	1.8%
Total	2552	

In year 2021 was 2552 people by religion 2090 from Roman Catholic Church, 273 from None, 92 from Not found out, 46 from Evangelical Church, 14 from Greek Catholic Church, 7 from Other, 6 from Christian Congregations in Slovakia, 5 from Ad hoc movements, 4 from Other and not ascertained christian church, 3 from Eastern Orthodox Church, 3 from Buddhism, 2 from Calvinist Church, 2 from Paganism and natural spirituality, 2 from Seventh-day Adventist Church, 1 from Jehovah's Witnesses, 1 from Hinduism and 1 from Baptists Church.
