= Pucov (Třebíč District) =

- Municipality
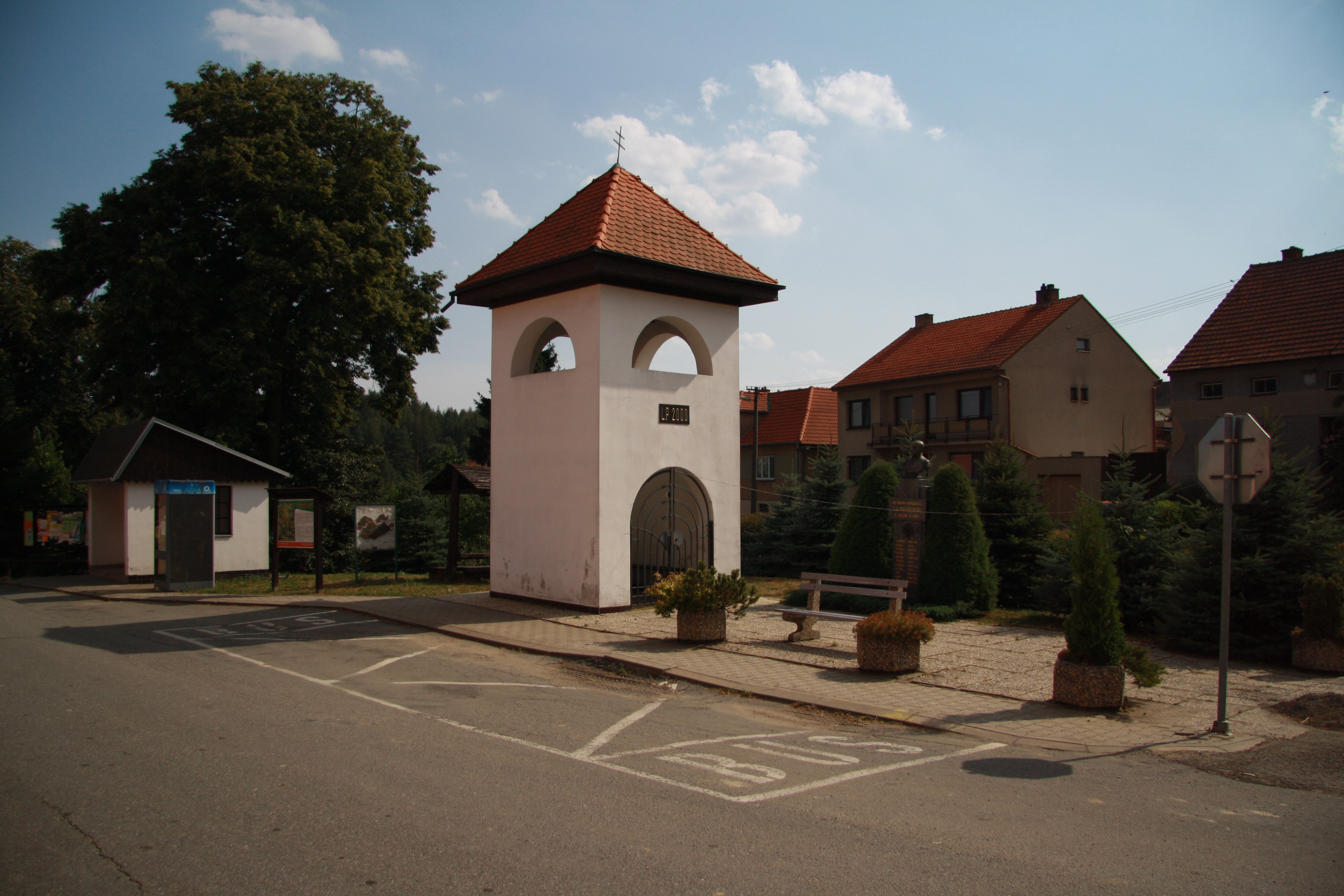
- Centre of Pucov

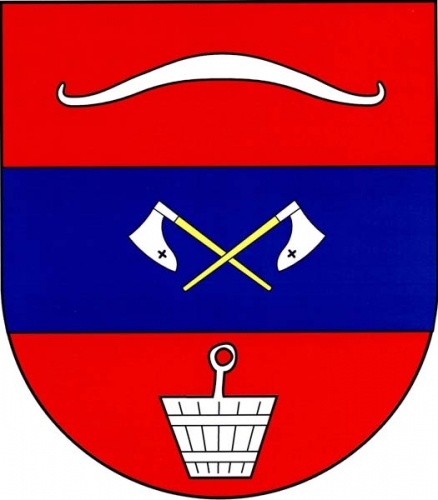
- Flag Coat of arms

- Location in the Czech Republic
- Coordinates: 49°14′50″N 16°10′27″E
- Country: Czech Republic
- Region: Vysočina
- District: Třebíč
- First mentioned: 1255

Area
  - Total: 4.91 km^{2} (1.90 sq mi)
- Elevation: 457 m (1,499 ft)

Population (2026-01-01)
  - Total: 168
  - Density: 34.2/km^{2} (88.6/sq mi)
- Time zone: UTC+1 (CET)
  - Summer (DST): UTC+2 (CEST)
- Postal code: 675 71
- Website: www.obecpucov.cz

Pucov is a municipality and village in Třebíč District in the Vysočina Region of the Czech Republic. It has about 200 inhabitants.

Pucov lies approximately 22 kilometres (14 mi) east of Třebíč, 46 km (29 mi) east of Jihlava, and 157 km (98 mi) south-east of Prague.

== Demographics ==
Historical population
Year	Pop.	±%
1869	302	—
1880	317	+5.0%
1890	321	+1.3%
1900	304	−5.3%
1910	293	−3.6%
1921	289	−1.4%
1930	297	+2.8%
1950	242	−18.5%
1961	226	−6.6%
1970	214	−5.3%
1980	164	−23.4%
1991	160	−2.4%
2001	133	−16.9%
2011	127	−4.5%
2021	153	+20.5%
Source: Censuses
