= Árva County =

County of the Kingdom of Hungary

Árva County Comitatus Arvensis (Latin) Árva vármegye (Hungarian) Komitat Arwa (German) Oravská župa (Slovak)
- County of the Kingdom of Hungary (14th century-1854, 1860-1920)
- Coat of arms

- Capital: Árvavárallya; Alsókubin (1683-1854, 1860-1920)
- Area
  - Coordinates: 49°13′N 19°18′E
  - 1910: 2,019 km^{2} (780 sq mi)
- Population
  - 1910: 78,700
- History
  - Established: 14th century
  - Merged to Árva-Turóc County: 13 September 1850
  - County recreated: 20 October 1860
  - Treaty of Trianon: 4 June 1920
- Today part of: Slovakia; Poland
- Oravský Podzámok; Dolný Kubín are the current name of the capital.

Árva County (Hungarian: Árva vármegye, Latin: Comitatus Arvensis, Slovak: Oravská stolica/župa, German: Komitat Arwa, Polish: Komitat Orawa) was an administrative county (comitatus) of the Kingdom of Hungary since the 14th century until 1920. Its territory is now in northern Slovakia and southern Poland. Today, the Slovak name is only used as an informal designation of the corresponding territory (see Orava region).

== Geography ==
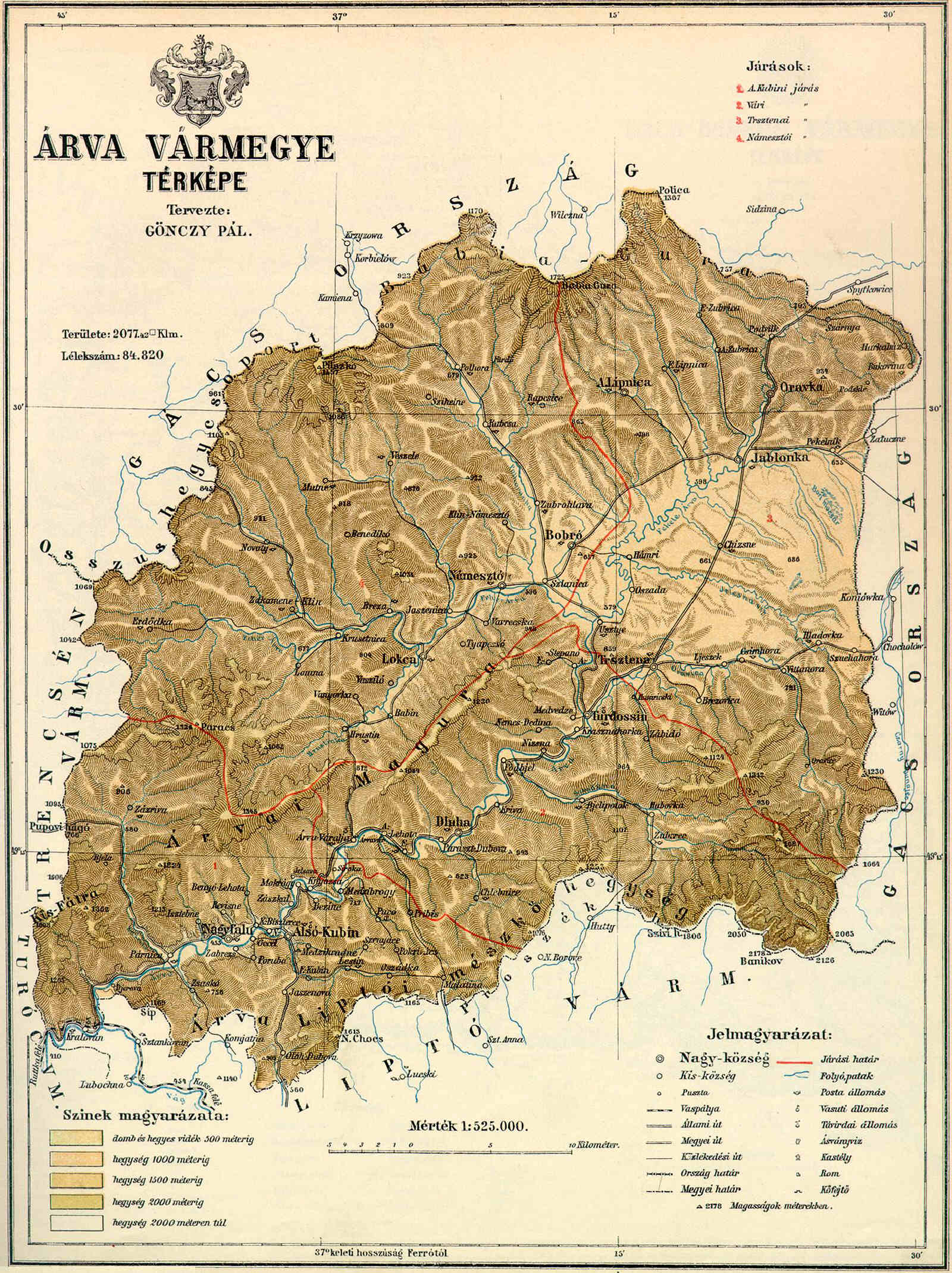
Map of Árva, 1891.

Between 1804-1854 and 1860-1920, Árva County shared borders with Austrian Galicia and the Hungarian counties of Trencsén, Turóc and Liptó County. The county's territory was situated along the Árva (Orava) river between Zázriva (Zázrivá) and the Tatra Mountains. Its area was 2,019 km^{2} (780 sq mi) around 1910. Now the territory is divided between Poland and Slovakia. The main Polish town of Orava is Jabłonka.

== Capitals ==
The county seat was at the Orava Castle (Hungarian: Árva vára). After the destruction of the town by the Lithuanian troops in 1683, the seat was moved to Alsókubin (also Kolbin, Kublen, Kubin, Also Helben, Clbin, Culbyn, Cublyn, present-day Dolný Kubín).

== History ==
Emerging from the Zólyom royal land (Hungarian: zólyomi erdőispánság), the first written mention about Árva County is from 1349. However, the territory had been still referenced as a district in 1351-1368 and it finally became a county with its own self-administration in 1370.

On 13 September 1850, following the Revolutions of 1848 in the Austrian Empire, Árva and Turóc counties were merged to form Árva-Turóc county, (Note: referred to as the Arva-Thurozer Gespanschaft in the 1850 legislation, and as Arva-Thuróczer Comitat in the 1854 legislation) becoming part of the Military District of Preßburg; this merger was re-affirmed in 1853 and 1854. In 1860 Hungary's pre-1850 counties, including Árva, were restored.

In the aftermath of World War I, the territory of the whole county became part of newly formed Czechoslovakia. After a border dispute (treated in detail under Polish–Czechoslovak border conflicts) several villages in the north-east territory were exchanged between Poland and Czechoslovakia. The former county's Czechoslovak part was abolished with effective date 1 January 1923 and its territory became a part of Váh County.

== Demographics ==
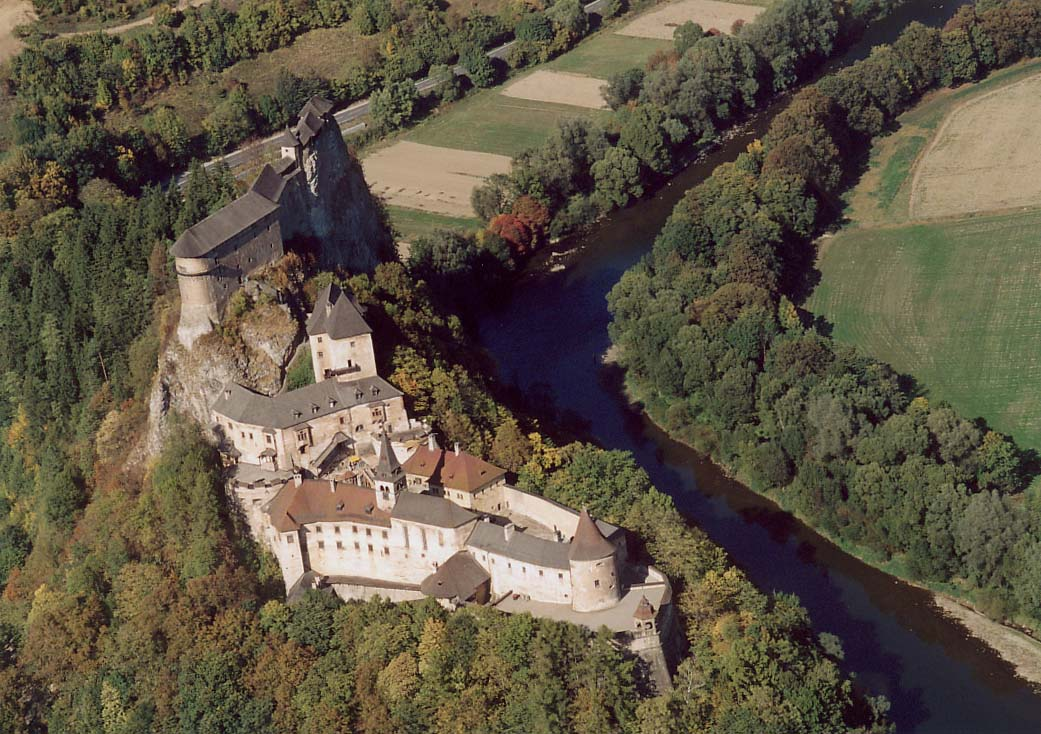
The original seat of the county was Orava Castle

Population by mother tongue (Note: Only linguistic communities > 1% are displayed.)
Census	Total	Slovak	Hungarian	German	Other or unknown
1880	81,643	75,901 (96.26%)	355 (0.45%)	2,213 (2.81%)	378 (0.48%)
1890	84,820	81,600 (96.20%)	773 (0.91%)	1,918 (2.26%)	529 (0.62%)
1900	85,009	80,487 (94.68%)	1,494 (1.76%)	2,127 (2.50%)	901 (1.06%)
1910	78,745	59,096 (75.05%)	2,000 (2.54%)	1,518 (1.93%)	16,131 (20.49%) (Note: most of them Polish)

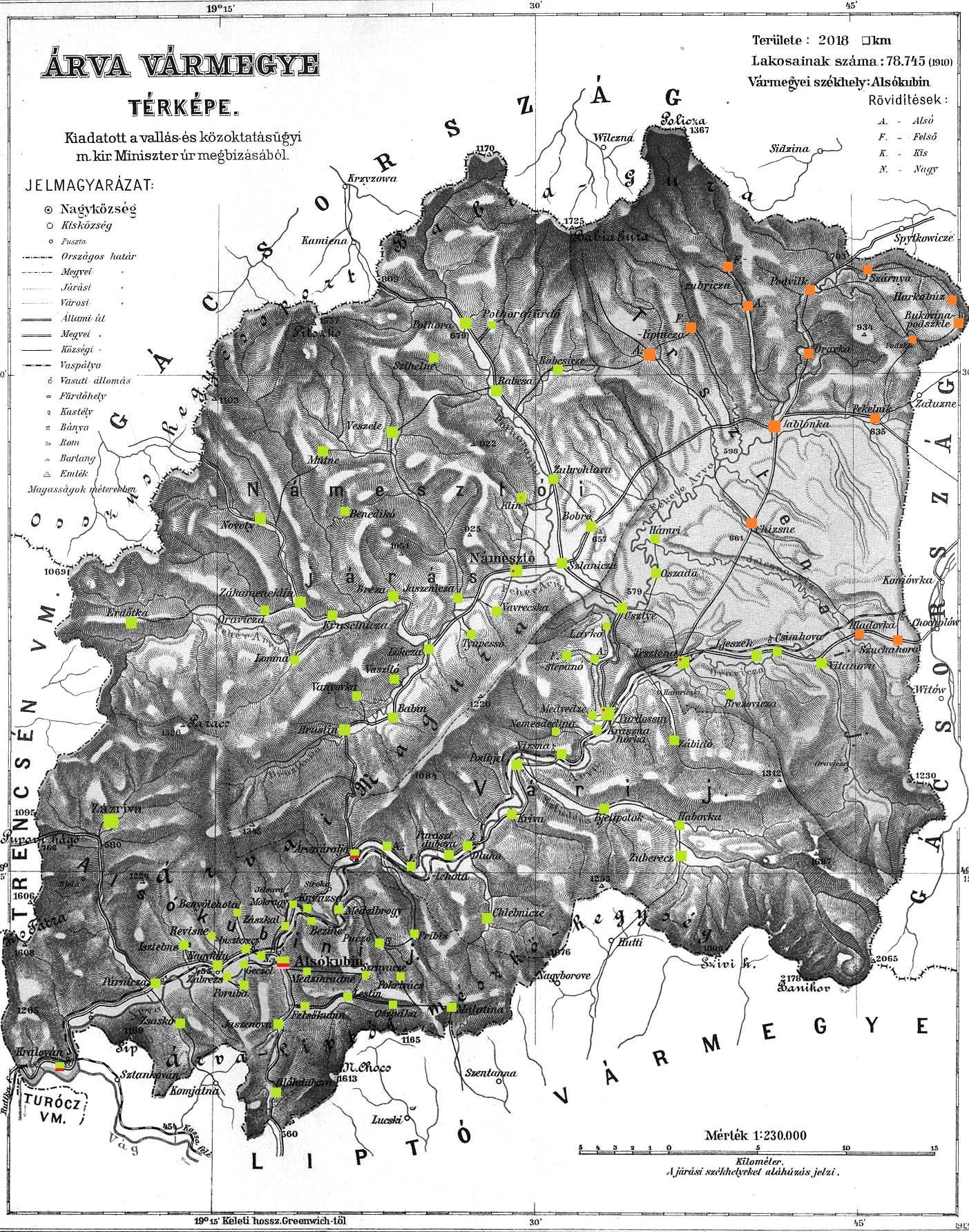
Ethnic map of the county with data of the 1910 census (see the key in the description)

Population by religion (Note: Only religious communities > 1% are displayed.)
Census	Total	Roman Catholic	Lutheran	Jewish	Other or unknown
1880	81,643	71,407 (87.46%)	7,272 (8.91%)	2,934 (3.59%)	30 (0.04%)
1890	84,820	74,892 (88.30%)	7,153 (8.43%)	2,742 (3.23%)	33 (0.04%)
1900	85,009	75,337 (88.62%)	6,936 (8.16%)	2,648 (3.11%)	88 (0.10%)
1910	78,745	69,788 (88.63%)	6,674 (8.48%)	2,205 (2.80%)	78 (0.10%)

== Districts ==
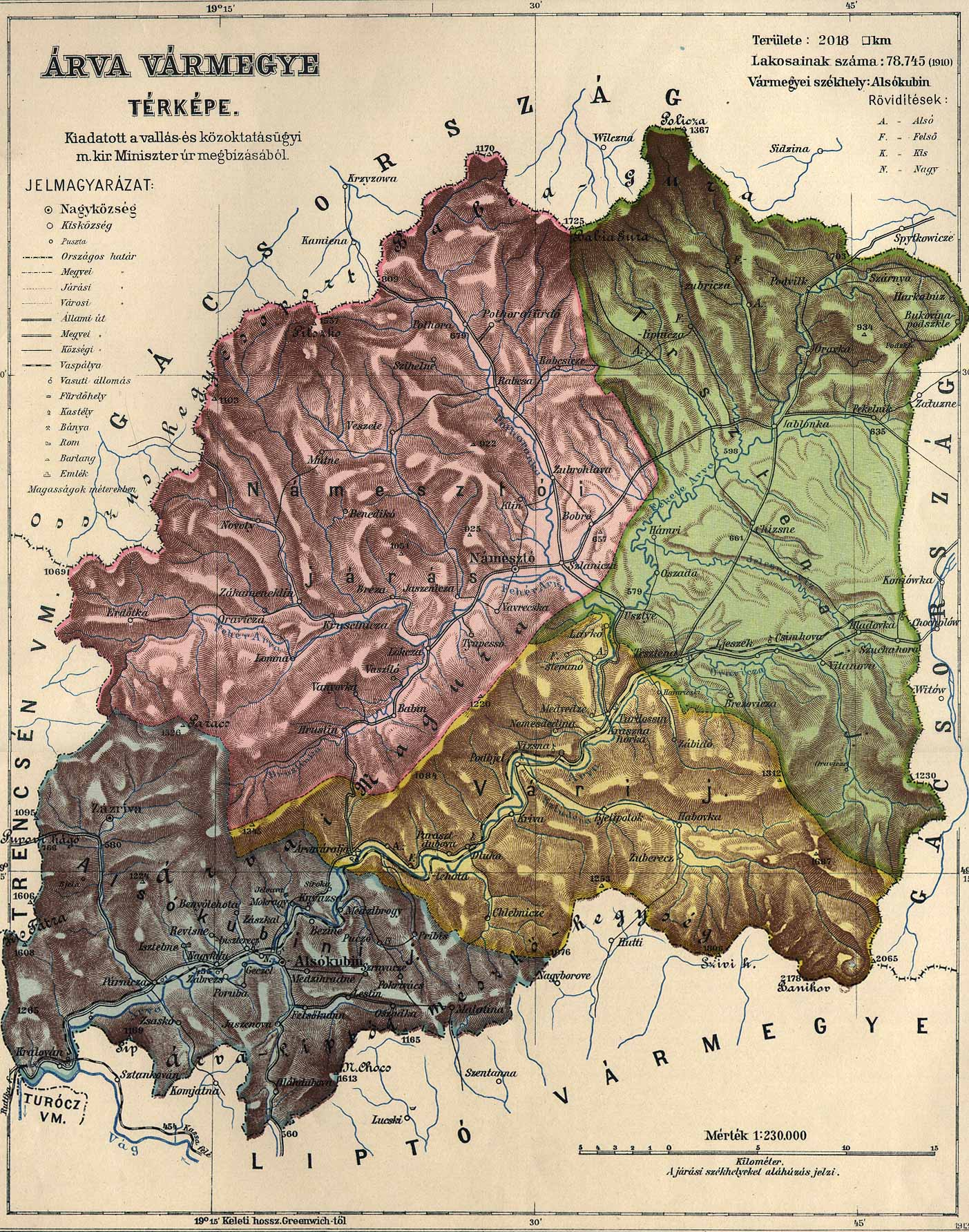

In the early 20th century, the districts and their capitals were:

Districts (járás)
District	Capital
Alsókubin	Alsókubin (now Dolný Kubín)
Námesztó	Námesztó (now Námestovo)
Trsztena	Trsztena (now Trstená)
Vár	Turdossin (now Tvrdošín)
