= St Emeric of Hungary Church, Čimhová =

St Emeric's Church
- Kostol sv. Imricha
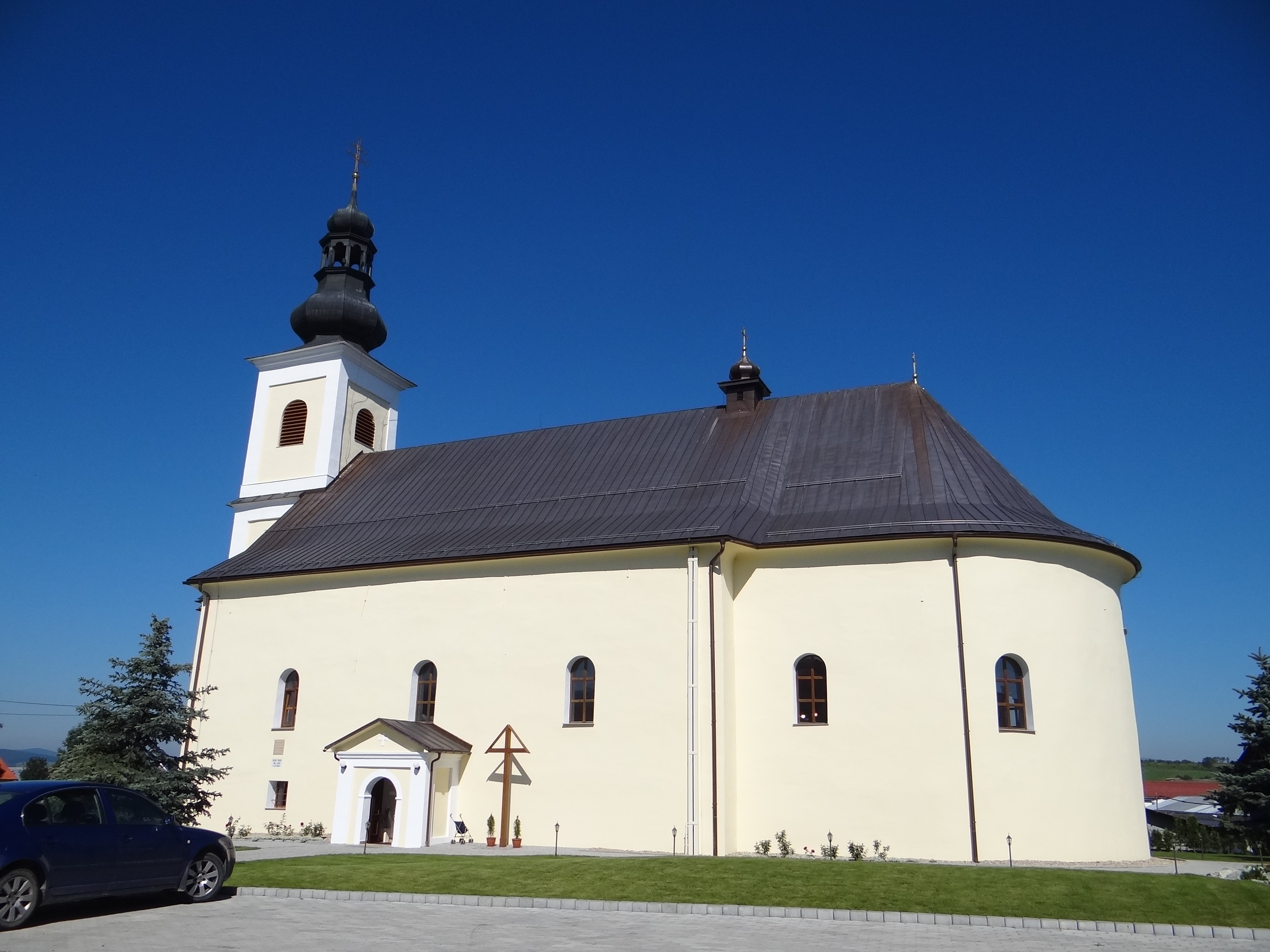
- St Emeric's Church

- Location in Slovakia
- 49°21′46″N 19°41′21″E
- Location: Čimhová
- Country: Slovakia
- Denomination: Roman Catholic

History
- Status: Parish Church
- Dedication: Saint Emeric of Hungary
- Consecrated: 22 July 2012

Architecture
- Heritage designation: Cultural Monument (The Monuments Board of the Slovak Republic, no. 510-214/0)
- Style: High Baroque
- Years built: 1775, reconstructions 1790, 1794, 1925, 2010-2012

Administration
- Diocese: Roman Catholic Diocese of Spiš

Clergy
- Priest: Milan Ferenčík

The Church of St Emeric (Slovak: Kostol sv. Imricha) is a High Baroque Roman Catholic church, located in Čimhová, Slovakia. It is dedicated to Saint Emeric of Hungary, crown prince of the Kingdom of Hungary. Built in 1775, it is probably the third church to be built on the site, the previous being wooden. It is one of the eldest churches of Orava region and has played an important role in its religious history. An example of rural Baroque structures of the region, it contains heritage altarpieces and unique frescoes, Rococo organ case and other valuable furniture.

== History ==
The spread of Christianity in the Orava region can be dated back to the times of Great Moravia. The area was incorporated in the Diocese of Nitra, later in the Archdiocese of Esztergom. In the 12th century, papal tax registers mention five parishes in the region, one of them being in Trstená, which also included all settlements emerging nearby.

=== Reformation and Counter-Reformation ===
The area of Čimhová was first settled in the 15th century, as a donation to Platthy family by the king Albert II of Germany. In line with the 'Cuius regio, eius religio' principle, the sugjects were following religion of their ruler. The Platthy family, originally from Liptov, had Catholic background in the medieval period. Historians are unsure about the religious status of the village in the late medieval era as there are insufficient records. However, after the reformation wave, a canonic visitation from Diocese of Nitra carried out in 1559-1560 found that the parishes of the region were administrated by married priests, with services held in Lutheran style- as preferred by the family ruling the rest of the region from the Orava Castle, the Thurzo family, which adopted Lutheranism.

A fraction of region's population rebelled against the conversion enforcement, as seen in the regional census- Čimhová's religious makeup consisted of 286 Lutherans and 52 Catholics. An inquiry, carried out by the Spiš Chapter in 1659, investigated religious terms in the region. Testimonies include individuals being beaten for providing catholic priests with material for building religious structures or refusing to confess to the lutheran clergy.

In 1645, under the patronage of king Ferdinand III, the Polish catholic priest Ján Sczechowicz arrived in Čimhová, which held a unique status in the region as it was not a direct subject to the Orava Castle, but a domain of the Platthy. From here, he directed the missionary work, sending polish catholic monks to lead services in neighbouring settlements. He also acquired a plot of land where he initiated construction of a wooden church, which was completed in 1653. Other sources suggest that a yet older wooden church has once stood in the village before, built in 1617. In 1648, after a short period of Sczechowicz's tenure in Čimhová, he moved to Orawka, where he died in 1659. During the late 17th and early 18th century, inhabitants of Čimhová kept Catholic faith, but within broader Trstená parish, until 1786.

=== Thököly Uprising ===
In 1683, the army of Polish-Lithuanian Commonwealth under the leadership of John III Sobieski helps the Habsburgs in suppressing the Thököly uprisings. Thököly and Kuruc armies controlled most of the region, and as the Polish-Lithuanian armies passed through, they plundered and burned the villages to the ground. The church suffered damage (although it is not certain if by fire) and collapsed later on, and so in 1696, another wooden church was built, which lasted until second half of 18th century. The architecture of the wooden churches and their interior may have highly probably been similar to the still-standing wooden Church of John the Baptist in Orawka, or the Church of St Elizabeth in Zuberec Open-Air Museum.

=== Current Church ===
The current church, made of stone, was completed in 1775 as a shared effort of inhabitants of all nearby villages belonging to the catholic parish. Stone material was favoured, as the previous wooden churches started to rot at their bases due to humidity from a nearby river.

The construction itself was carried out by the locals, the municipality financed most of the expense and provided material transport, manual handling and two furnaces to manufacture bricks. The inhabitants of the small village had trouble finalising the project and asked the Orava castle to provide help, which responded with providing additional stone and bound the administration of Liesek with a provision of extra help. Financial shortage was addressed by the issue of a Royal Decree, requested by the Diocese of Esztergom vicariate in 1773. The Hungarian Royal Chamber in Pressburg donated 200 florins.

The church was projected to be 16,25 klafter (approx. 30m) long and 7 klafter (13,2m) wide. The tower was not initially joined to the nave at the west side as today, but rather stemming from the roof above the western portal, made out of wood. The current tower was built in 1810.

In autumn 1775, shortly after the completion, two earthquakes occurred. The first left visible cracks in the vaulting and elsewhere, causing concerns over safety. After a loose brick fell on the congregation, liturgical celebrations were banned until further notice. Second earthquake made the entire vaulting collapse, leaving truss at sight. After a risk assessment and a cleanup, services could have been held.

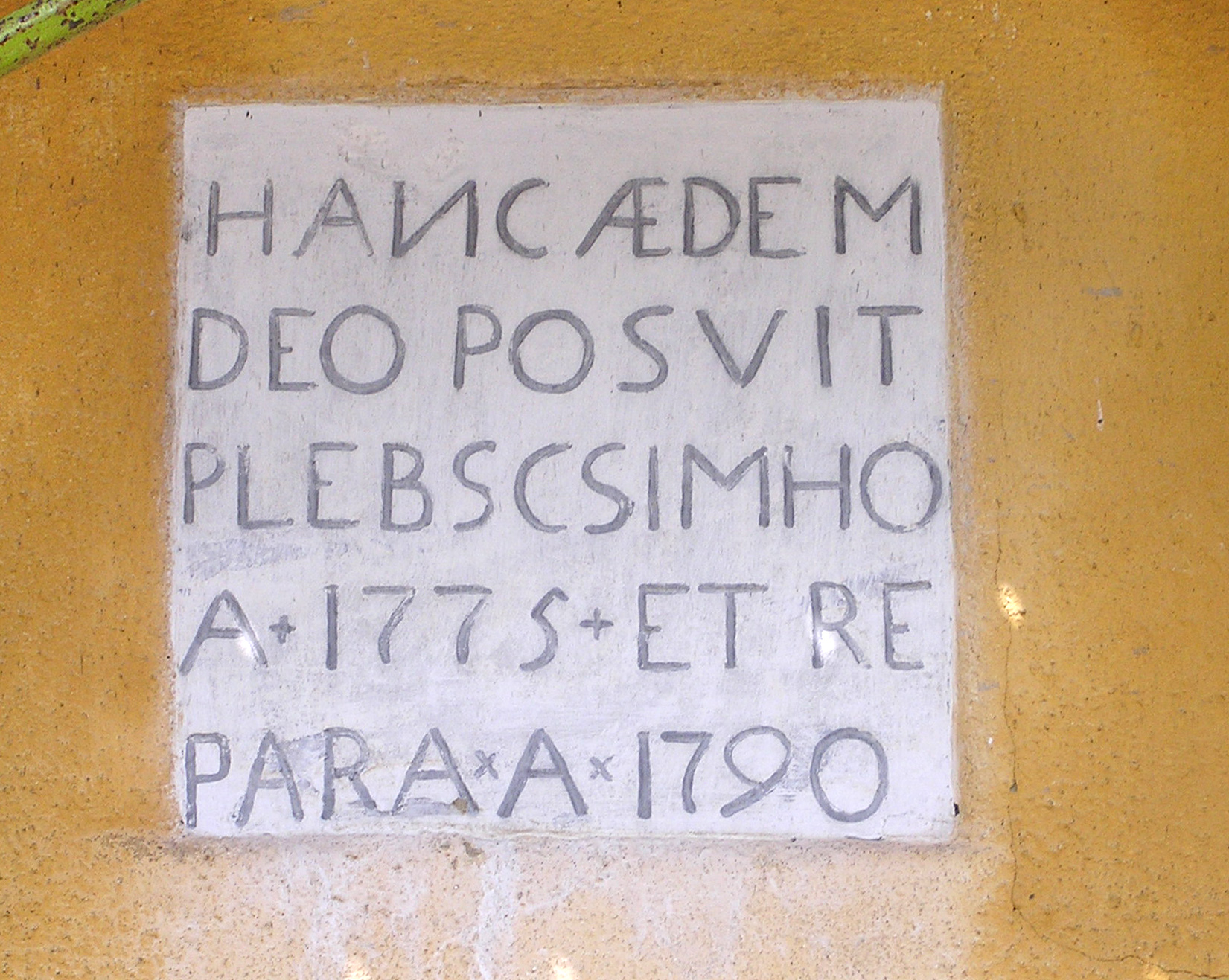
Plaque in the southern wall, added after 1790 reconstruction.

The state of the church, mockingly described as a stable, sparked controversies among the inhabitants of Liesek, which longed to build a church of their own. The conflict was resolved after a deputation from the county interfered. Resolution bound the parishioners to restore the vault, which was finished in 1790. The conflict remained present in the church, e.g. the pews were divided into sides meant for people of the two respective villages. Tensions between parishioners occupying other than designated pews often escalated into open arguments inside the church.

In 1925, church underwent reconstruction, with new pews and flooring installed.

The church sustained damage during the WWII, when the frontline arrived at a standstill between Čimhová and eastwards neighbouring Vitanová. Retreating Axis forces took over the parsonage and the priest fled westbound to Liesek. Bombardment has damaged the roof, which collapsed, together with a part of the vault, above the organ. Sources are unclear in describing the exact damages the church has suffered.

After the Second Vatican Council, sanctuary was adjusted to fit the reformed mass, with new altar and lectern made of marble and graphite.

Most recent comprehensive reconstruction work was undertaken from 2010 to 2012. First, work on the exterior was carried out- the foundation was dried, new external plastering applied, then, the roof was completely modernised, with new beams for the truss and copper roofing. Restoration then moved inside, conducted in line with the Monuments Board of the Slovak Republic. Works oversaw the worn flooring replaced, walls redecorated and most notably, apse was restored, where a rare fresco, a painted altarpiece, was discovered in 2008 by the preservation inquiry. The wooden altarpiece was conserved and restored in accordance with historical research.

After this restoration, the church was consecrated in 2012 by the diocesan bishop of Spiš Štefan Sečka, for the first time since 1775.

== Tower and the spirelet ==
Towers of the wooden churches were situated on the west side of the nave and joined with the structure, as this was a local practice (All Saints Church of Tvrdošín).

Two decades after the third church was built, its then-wooden tower collapsed in a devastating blizzard which occurred on 25 January 1794. Many structures in the village were destroyed since the blizzard started at around three in the afternoon. The tower lasted until 10pm when it staggered and collapsed into the roof above the newly reconstructed vault which surprisingly remained intact. Salvaging the material and other reparatory work to secure the roofing were carried out in a month, a noteworthy time considering the winter weather conditions of the region. The new and current tower was completed in June 1810, with a financial help of His Imperial-Royal Majesty, Francis II.

The small tower (spirelet) above the nave was pyramid-shaped until the reconstruction of 2012, when it was historicised (by the addition of an onion-shaped roof) to suit the general baroque style of the building. Since 2012, it houses a small bell, named John Paul, which is used in the mass during transubstantiation.

=== Belfry ===
Belfry is located on the highest floor of the tower. It contains four bells, Great, Medium, Small and a Dead Bell (decreasing in size), which can be operated from the sacristy. The numbers of bells varied through time, affected by the collapse of the tower, World War I (two bells have been collected to be recast as ammunition) or natural breakdowns.

Chronicles mention three bells occupying the belfry of the first wooden church. The casting date of the eldest is not known, but has been recast after crack appeared in 1711, the other two were dated to the year 1653 and 1666. These were in use until they shattered in the collapse of 1794, and were recast in Banská Bystrica and depicted Saints Peter and Paul. The belfry also contains a virtual carillon which is not in use.

== Organ ==
There were at least four organs in the church prior to the current one. The first documented was only temporary- an organ by an unknown maker that used to serve the previous wooden church, was stored in the sacristy. This was most likely a small positive or portative organ. The second organ was also made by an unknown maker. In the course of time, it was deemed insufficient for the space and in quite bad condition, and it was offered to Liesek parish for their new church as a temporary solution.

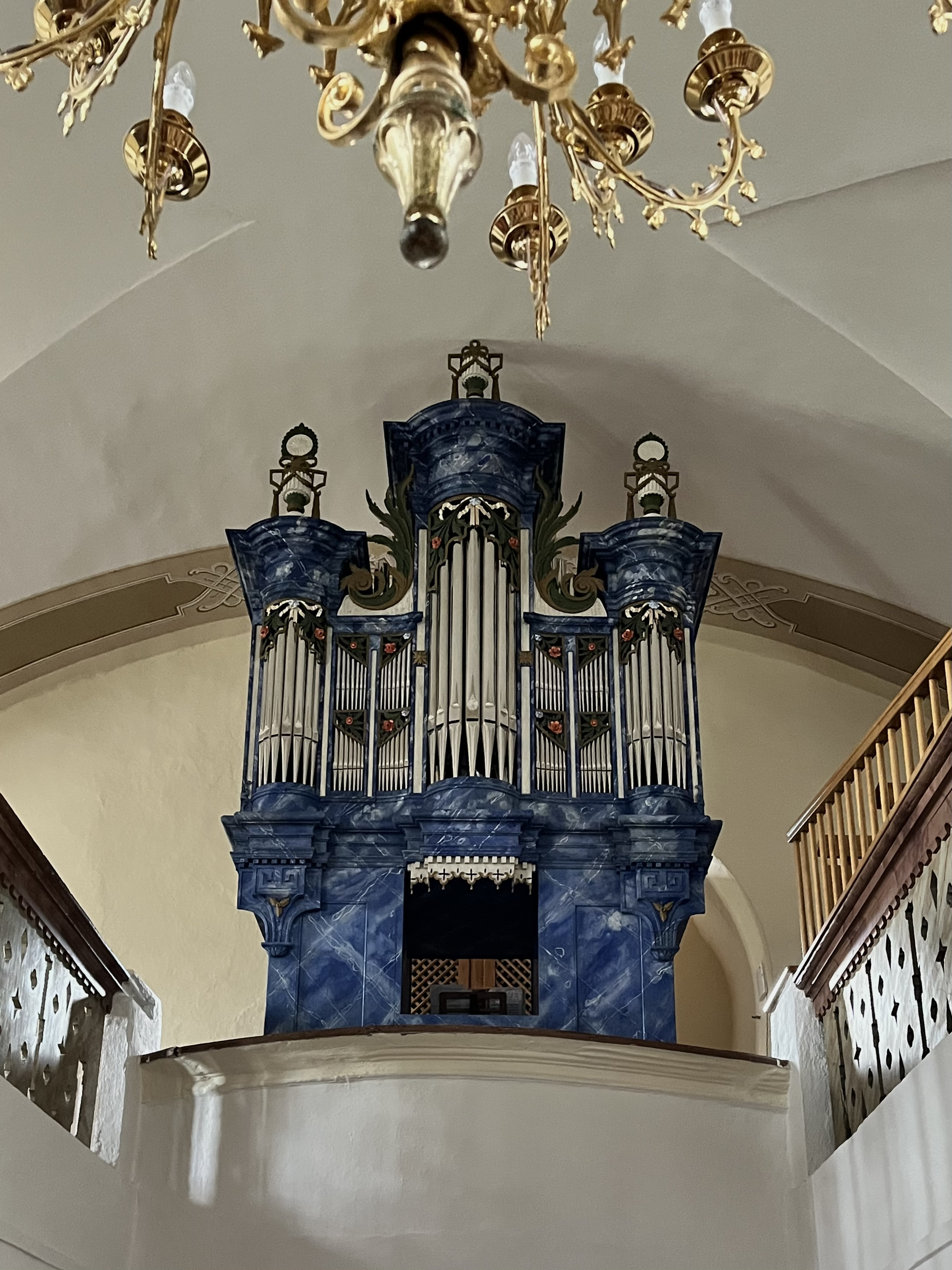
The Bies organ built in 2025

Third organ was ordered from the well-established workshop of Pažický family from Rajec around 1811. The builder presented great plans for a medium size organ with 17 stops, two manuals and pedal. This was scaled down after protests from Trstená parish, which disagreed with the proposed size, and was therefore supposed to be similar to the one built for parish in Trstená, an organ with 11 stops, one manual and pedal. After many extensions and financial problems, on the side of both the builder and the parish, an organ with 10 stops was delivered in 1818.

Only the case remains to this day- the instrument was lost in 1908, after being replaced by the Ottó Rieger Budapest company. Later works were carried out by Jozef Hardoník- in 1934, bellows moved inside the case, and by Štefan Gábor- in 1977, modifications to stops Flauta 4', new stops Larigot 1 1/3', Kvinta 2 2/3' and Roh Nočný 2' (Nachthorn).

In 2025, Slovak organ manufacturer Dielňa Bies delivered a new organ with 14 stops, two manuals and a pedal. The 1818 case was restored, regaining its original blue color and faux-marble surface. The manufacturer also reintroduced the aperture in the base of the case, an original solution of Pažický organs that allowed for visual contact with the service, meanwhile the organist was seated behind the console from the rear side of the case. A second 'Hinterpositiv' case was added, which houses second manual and pedal.

== In popular culture ==
In 1966, movie Živý Bič directed by Martin Ťapák (based on wartime novel by Milo Urban) was produced at various locations in Orava region, and St Emeric church served to portray Ráztoky church.
