= Suchá Hora =

- Municipality
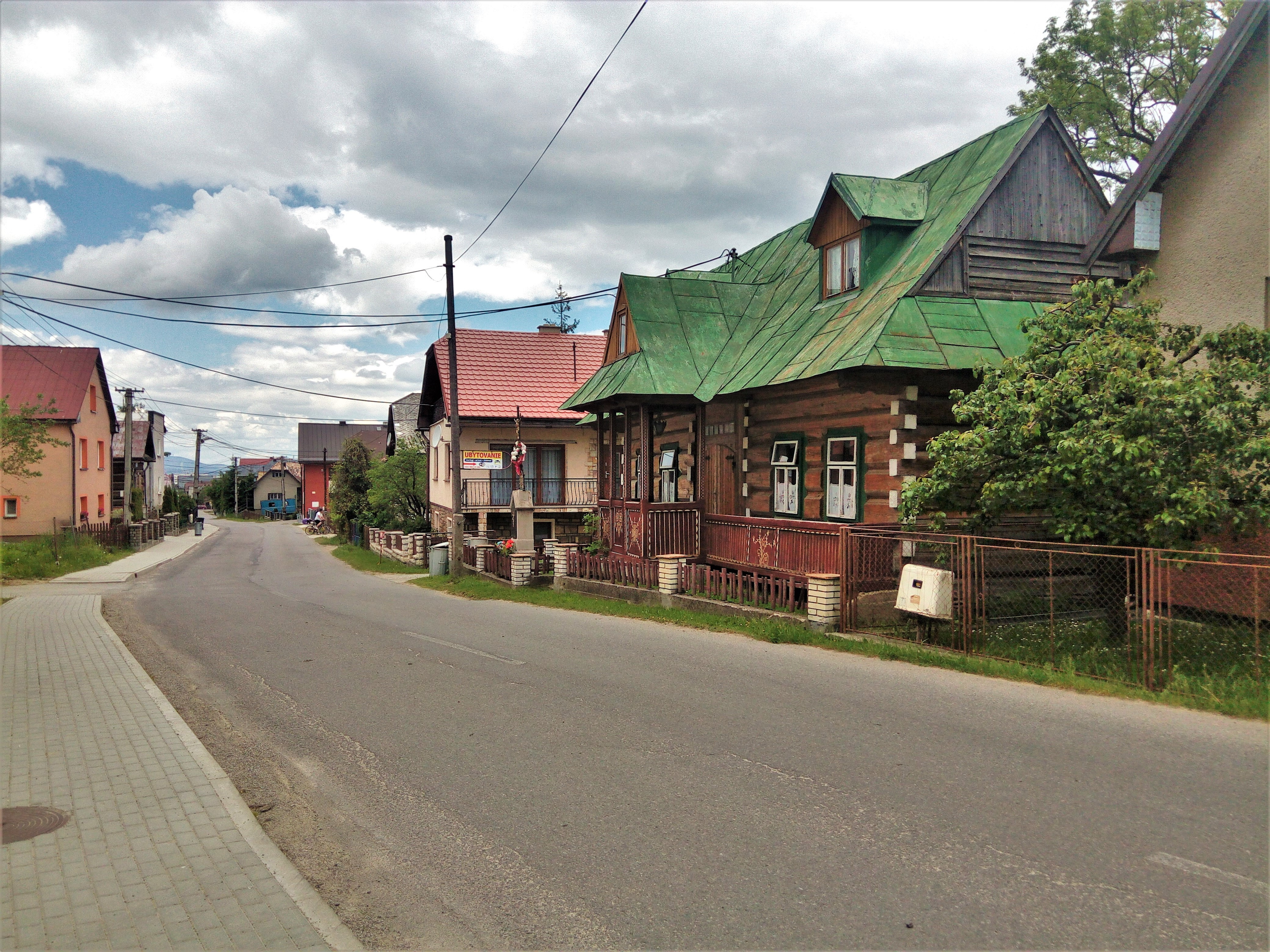

- Flag

- Location of Suchá Hora in the Žilina Region Location of Suchá Hora in Slovakia
- Coordinates: 49.37°N 19.78°E
- Country: Slovakia
- Region: Žilina Region
- District: Tvrdošín District
- First mentioned: 1566

Area
  - Total: 21.85 km^{2} (8.44 sq mi)
- Elevation: 798 m (2,618 ft)

Population (2025)
  - Total: 1,495
- Time zone: UTC+1 (CET)
  - Summer (DST): UTC+2 (CEST)
- Postal code: 271 3
- Area code: +421 43
- Vehicle registration plate (until 2022): TS
- Website: www.suchahora.eu

Suchá Hora (also known by other names) is a village and municipality in Tvrdošín District in the Žilina Region of northern Slovakia.

== History ==
The area became part of Poland in the 10th or early 11th century, and later it passed to Hungary. The village was founded in the mid 16th century based on Wallachian Law. Around 1890, the village had a population of 804, 91,8% Polish by ethnicity. It became again part of Poland in 1918, then it passed to Czechoslovakia in 1919, back to Poland in 1920, to Czechoslovakia in 1924, to Poland in 1938, to Slovakia in 1939, to Czechoslovakia in 1945 and to Slovakia in 1993.

== Etymology and other names ==
The oldest mention of the village is from 1566 as "Zucha" and from 1588 it has been known as Suchá Hora (In Slovak). The name of the village means dry mountain.

The village is known as "Sucha Góra" in Polish, occasionally as "Sucha Góra Orawska" (Orawska meaning Oravian, referring to the region of Orava/Orawa).

The village is known as "Szuchahora" in Hungarian.

== Geography ==
The municipality lies at an altitude of 798 metres (2,618 ft) and covers an area of 21.85 km^{2} (8.44 sq mi) (2025).

Suchá Hora is located in the historical region of Orava.

== Population ==
Population statistic (10 years)
Year	1995	2005	2015	2025
Count	1166	1300	1406	1495
Difference		+11.49%	+8.15%	+6.33%

Population statistic
Year	2024	2025
Count	1483	1495
Difference		+0.80%

It has a population of 1495 people (31 December 2025).

=== Ethnicity ===
Census 2021 (1+ %)
Ethnicity	Number	Fraction
Slovak	1401	96.28%
Not found out	184	12.64%
Polish	30	2.06%
Total	1455	

In year 2021 was 1455 people by ethnicity 1401 as Slovak, 184 as Not found out, 30 as Polish, 3 as Other, 1 as Czech, 1 as Irish, 1 as Romani and 1 as Russian.

Note on population: The difference values of population numbers in the table "Population statistic" and in the sections "Ethnicity" & "Religion" is caused by the use of various statistical methods.

=== Religion ===
Census 2021 (1+ %)
Religion	Number	Fraction
Roman Catholic Church	1375	94.5%
Not found out	34	2.34%
None	26	1.79%
Total	1455	

In year 2021 was 1455 people by religion 1375 from Roman Catholic Church, 34 from Not found out, 26 from None, 7 from Greek Catholic Church, 4 from Christian Congregations in Slovakia, 2 from Eastern Orthodox Church, 2 from Other and not ascertained christian church, 2 from Evangelical Church, 2 from Ad hoc movements and 1 from Calvinist Church.

== Other locations ==
- 1228 metres high mountain near Banská Bystrica. Site of an FM- and TV-transmitter.

== Sources ==
- "Suchá Hora - História". e-obce.sk (in Slovak). Retrieved October 1, 2020.
