= Čimhová =

- Municipality
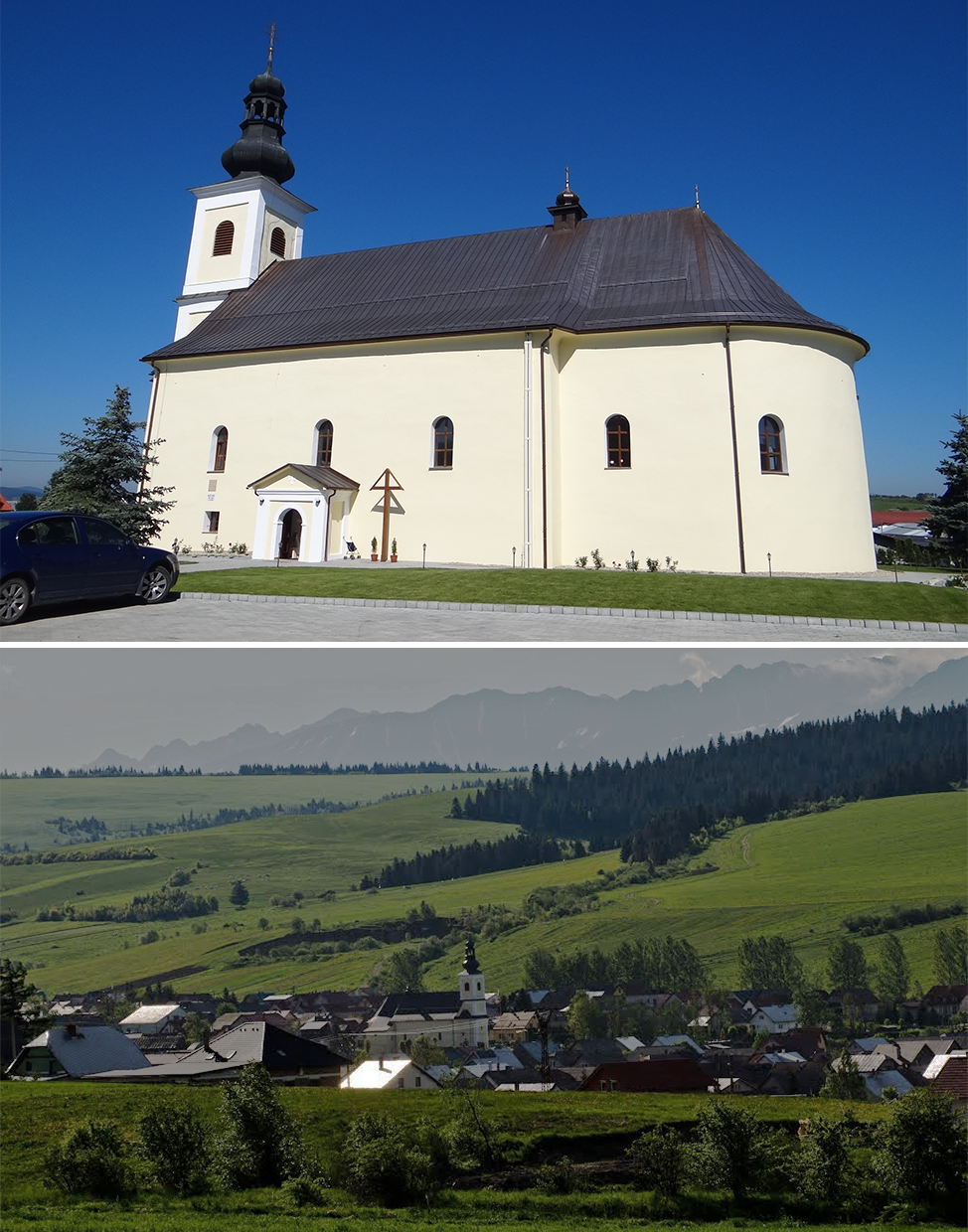
- Montage from top- Church of St Emeric, Skyline of the village with neighbouring Skorušina mountains

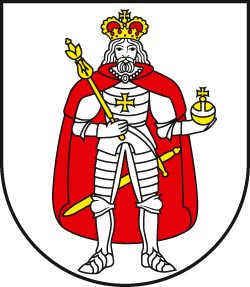
- Flag Coat of arms

- Location of Čimhová in the Žilina Region Location of Čimhová in Slovakia
- Coordinates: 49.37°N 19.68°E
- Country: Slovakia
- Region: Žilina Region
- District: Tvrdošín District
- First mentioned: 1438
- Founder: House of Platthy

Government
  - Type: Mayor-Council Government
  - Body: Municipal council
  - Mayor: Dušan Duda (KDH)

Area
  - Total: 6.38 km^{2} (2.46 sq mi)
- Elevation: 666 m (2,185 ft)

Population (2025)
  - Total: 701
- Time zone: UTC+1 (CET)
  - Summer (DST): UTC+2 (CEST)
- Postal code: 271 2
- Area code: +421 43
- Vehicle registration plate (until 2022): TS
- Website: www.obeccimhova.sk

Čimhová (Hungarian: Csimhova, Polish: Czymhowa) is a village and municipality in Tvrdošín District in the Žilina Region of the northern Slovakia. It has over 600 inhabitants and lies on the banks of Oravica river, in the Orava Basin, near the Slovak-Polish border.

== History ==
In historical records the village was first mentioned in 1438. The prime settlements were established as part of the colonisation period which started in the 13th century. The house of Platthy received the area as a donation from the king Albert II of Germany, as a recognition for their service in fighting against the Ottomans. The name 'Chemechowá' (original from 1428) is derived from the flowering plant bird cherry, 'čremcha' (in Slovak) or 'chemecha' (in the local dialect). The name evolved continuously, as the scribes and officials of the kingdom were of Hungarian or German origin. It was also a target for mockeries from the officials of Orava County, which harboured negative stance to the village's owners, the house of Platthy originally from the Liptov County. This conflict of nobility was a cause of many historical events which ultimately gave shape to the realities present in the contemporary towns and villages located in Orava Basin.

== Geography ==
The municipality lies at an altitude of 666 metres (2,185 ft) and covers an area of 6.38 km^{2} (2.46 sq mi) (2025).

== Population ==
Population statistic (10 years)
Year	1995	2005	2015	2025
Count	607	656	669	701
Difference		+8.07%	+1.98%	+4.78%

Population statistic
Year	2024	2025
Count	681	701
Difference		+2.93%

It has a population of 701 people (31 December 2025).

=== Ethnicity ===
Census 2021 (1+ %)
Ethnicity	Number	Fraction
Slovak	673	99.7%
Other	8	1.18%
Total	675	

In year 2021 was 675 people by ethnicity 673 as Slovak, 8 as Other, 2 as Russian, 2 as Polish, 1 as Czech, 1 as Ukrainian and 1 as Not found out.

Note on population: The difference values of population numbers in the table "Population statistic" and in the sections "Ethnicity" & "Religion" is caused by the use of various statistical methods.

=== Religion ===
Census 2021 (1+ %)
Religion	Number	Fraction
Roman Catholic Church	644	95.41%
None	18	2.67%
Total	675	

In year 2021 was 675 people by religion 644 from Roman Catholic Church, 18 from None, 5 from Islam, 2 from Not found out, 2 from Evangelical Church, 2 from Ad hoc movements, 1 from Other and not ascertained christian church and 1 from Greek Catholic Church.

== Genealogical resources ==
The records for genealogical research are available at the state archive "Statny Archiv in Bytca, Slovakia"

- Roman Catholic church records (births/marriages/deaths): 1787-1879 (parish A)

== See also ==
- List of municipalities and towns in Slovakia
