= Zuberec =

- Municipality
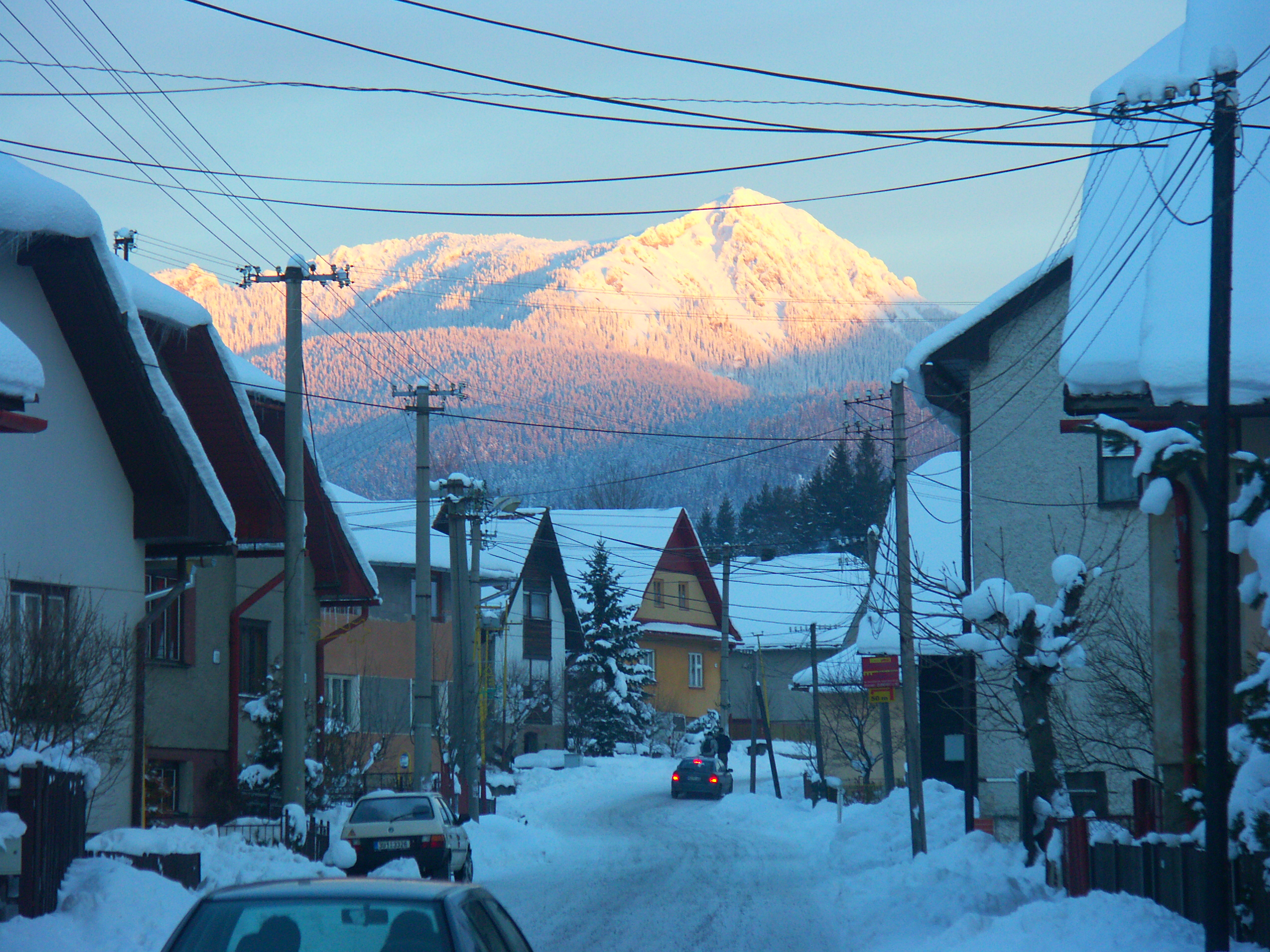

- Flag Coat of arms

- Location of Zuberec in the Žilina Region Location of Zuberec in Slovakia
- Coordinates: 49.27°N 19.62°E
- Country: Slovakia
- Region: Žilina Region
- District: Tvrdošín District
- First mentioned: 1593

Area
  - Total: 72.31 km^{2} (27.92 sq mi)
- Elevation: 762 m (2,500 ft)

Population (2025)
  - Total: 1,926
- Time zone: UTC+1 (CET)
  - Summer (DST): UTC+2 (CEST)
- Postal code: 273 2
- Area code: +421 43
- Vehicle registration plate (until 2022): TS
- Website: www.zuberec.sk

Zuberec (Hungarian: Bölényfalu) is a village in northern Slovakia and a popular tourist center at the foothills of the Western Tatras. Zuberec features numerous accommodation facilities, restaurants, museum and a tourist information office.

The village is the place of several cultural and sporting events including Podroháčske folklórne slávnosti (folk festival), Goralský klobúčik (alpine skiing), Oravaman (triathlon) and WSA Eurocup Zuberec (dogsled racing).

== Name ==
Zuberec is called Zuberzec in Polish and Bölényfalu in Hungarian. It is named after the European bison (Slovak: Zubor), an animal that used to be abundant in the region at the time of the foundation of the village.

== History ==
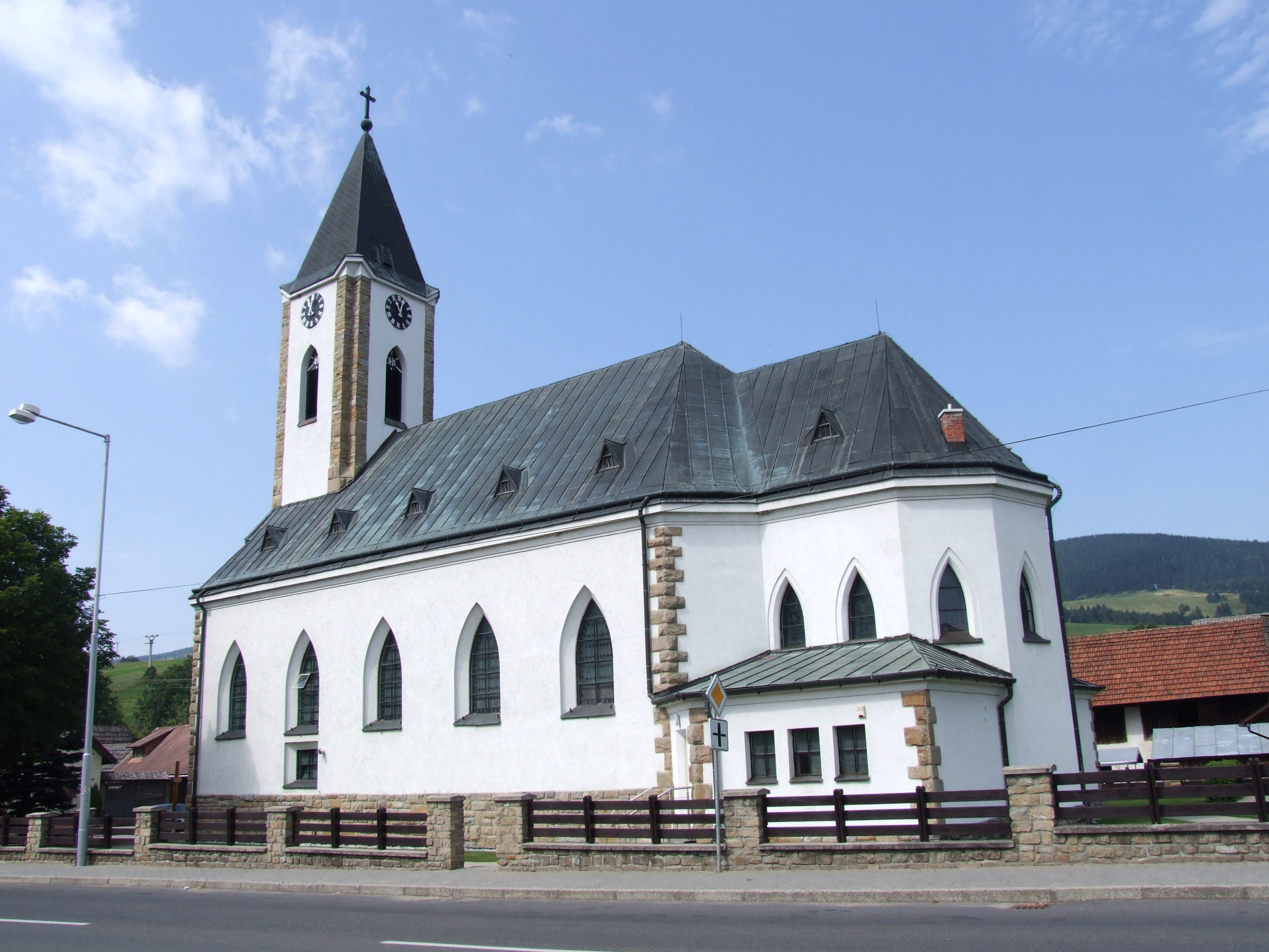
Church in Zuberec

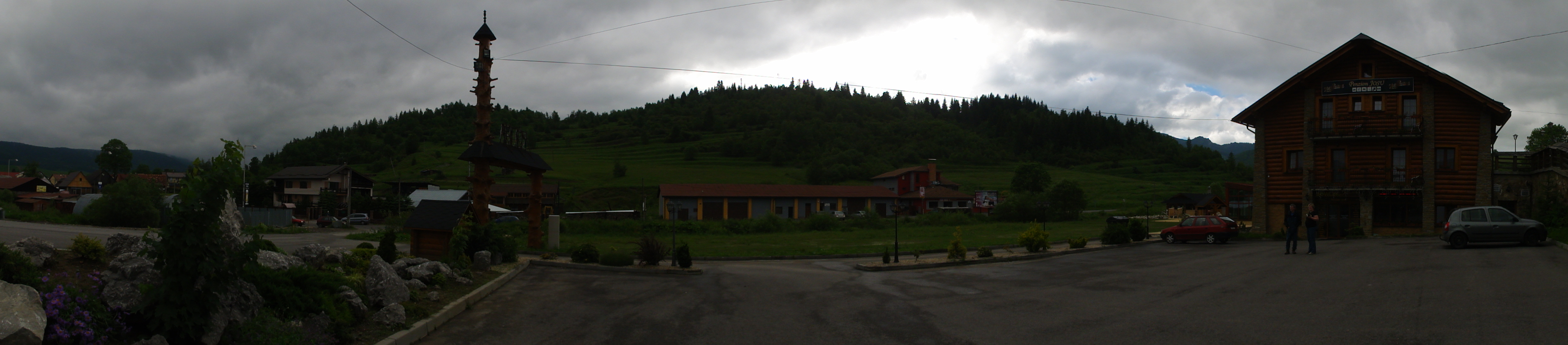
Zuberec panorama

Zuberec was founded in 1593, when the village was known as Zwberczyc, by shepherds and farmers under Vlach colonization law Lex Antiqua Valachorum. It was subordinate, like the surrounding villages, to the Orava Castle. The village ceased to exist because of the Bocskay uprising, but it was later re-colonized. In 1683 it was devastated by the soldiers of the Polish–Lithuanian Commonwealth.

Zuberec contains the neo-Gothic Church of Saint Vendelin built in the 1930s according to project of Milan Michal Harminec. At that time, Zuberec did not contain a church and there were space issues in the church in nearby village Habovka. Its founding stone was laid down in 1929 and the church was consecrated in 1933 by the catholic priest Andrej Hlinka. There are relics of Saint Vendelin housed here. There is a stone cross in front of the church from the year 1839. Local cemetery contains gravestones featuring folklore stone reliefs from the end of the 19th century.

== Geography ==
The municipality lies at an altitude of 762 metres (2,500 ft) and covers an area of 72.31 km^{2} (27.92 sq mi) (2025).

Zuberec is situated in the Tvrdošín District of the Žilina Region. Historically, it was part of the Orava region. The village lies at an altitude of 760 metres, under the Roháče mountains. The municipality covers an area of 72.31 km².

== Population ==
Population statistic (10 years)
Year	1995	2005	2015	2025
Count	1696	1845	1835	1926
Difference		+8.78%	−0.54%	+4.95%

Population statistic
Year	2024	2025
Count	1928	1926
Difference		−0.10%

It has a population of 1926 people (31 December 2025).

=== Ethnicity ===
Census 2021 (1+ %)
Ethnicity	Number	Fraction
Slovak	1869	97.69%
Not found out	41	2.14%
Total	1913	

In year 2021 was 1913 people by ethnicity 1869 as Slovak, 41 as Not found out, 14 as Czech, 3 as Other, 3 as English, 2 as Russian, 2 as Polish, 2 as Hungarian, 1 as Irish, 1 as German and 1 as Greek.

Note on population: The difference values of population numbers in the table "Population statistic" and in the sections "Ethnicity" & "Religion" is caused by the use of various statistical methods.

=== Religion ===
Census 2021 (1+ %)
Religion	Number	Fraction
Roman Catholic Church	1726	90.22%
None	127	6.64%
Not found out	32	1.67%
Total	1913	

In year 2021 was 1913 people by religion 1726 from Roman Catholic Church, 127 from None, 32 from Not found out, 8 from Evangelical Church, 5 from Jehovah's Witnesses, 5 from Greek Catholic Church, 3 from Calvinist Church, 3 from Other, 1 from Other and not ascertained christian church, 1 from Christian Congregations in Slovakia, 1 from Buddhism and 1 from Ad hoc movements.

Zuberec has a population of 1,810 (as of December 31, 2005). According to the 2001 census, 99.6% of inhabitants were Slovaks and 97.6% Roman Catholics.

== Open-air museum ==
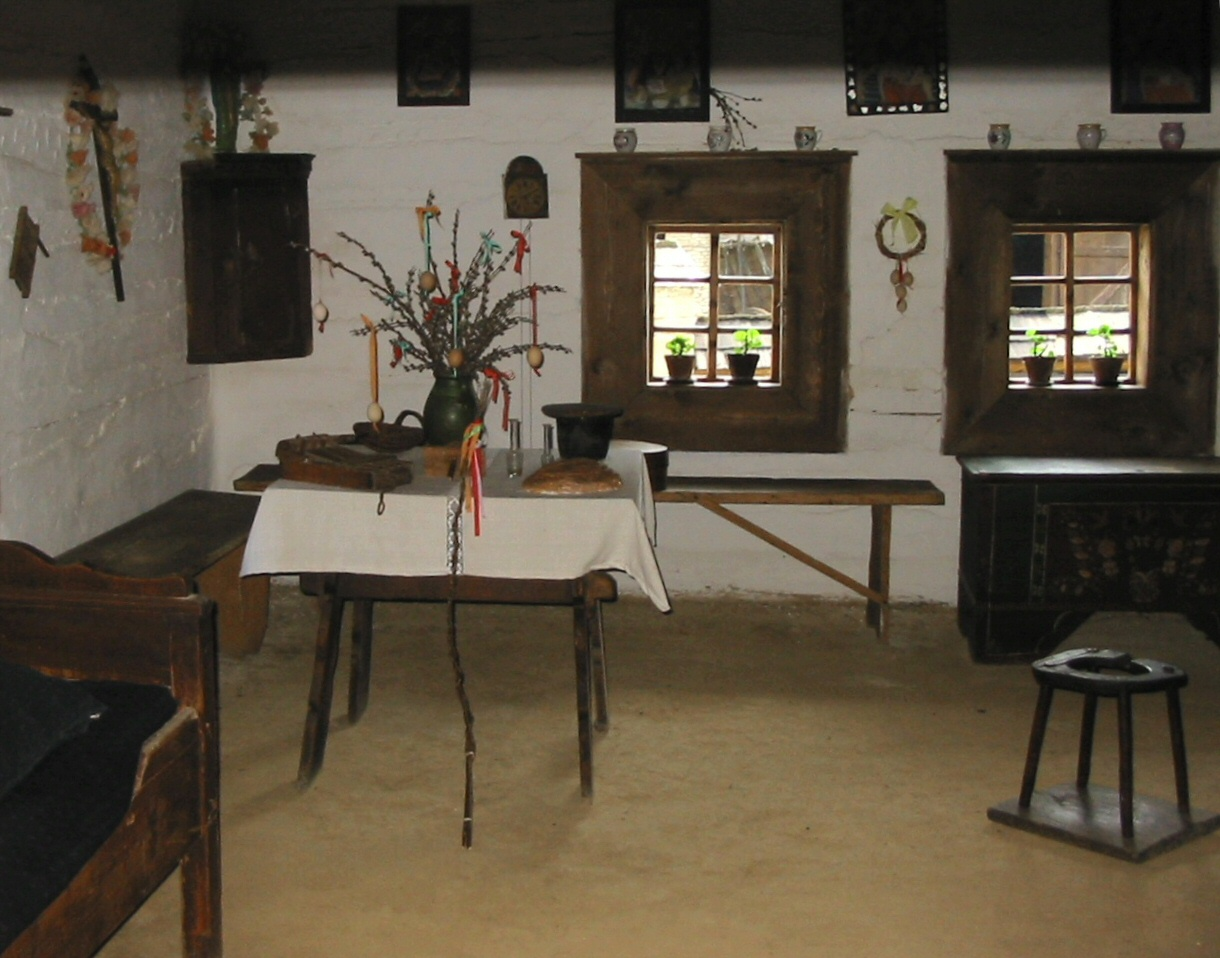
Interior of one of the houses in the Zuberec open-air museum

The Museum of the Orava Village (Slovak: Múzeum oravskej dediny) is located in Zuberec. This open-air museum of folk architecture exhibits intact rural houses brought from all around the region of Orava and re-assembled in Zuberec. The oldest building, a Gothic wooden church, was constructed in the 15th century, but the museum itself was founded in 1967. In addition to the church, it now also has its own graveyard and a functioning watermill. The interior of the buildings hosts an ethnographic collection. The gardens and fields around the houses show various ancient forms of farming and animal husbandry.

== Skiing ==
Zuberec has three ski resorts: Zuberec Janovky, Zuberec Milotín, and Zverovka Spálená.

== See also ==
- Tatra Mountains
- Orava Highlands
