= Most Holy Trinity Church, Tvrdošín =

Church in Tvrdošín District, Slovakia

Coordinates: 49°19′59.44″N 19°33′17.30″E

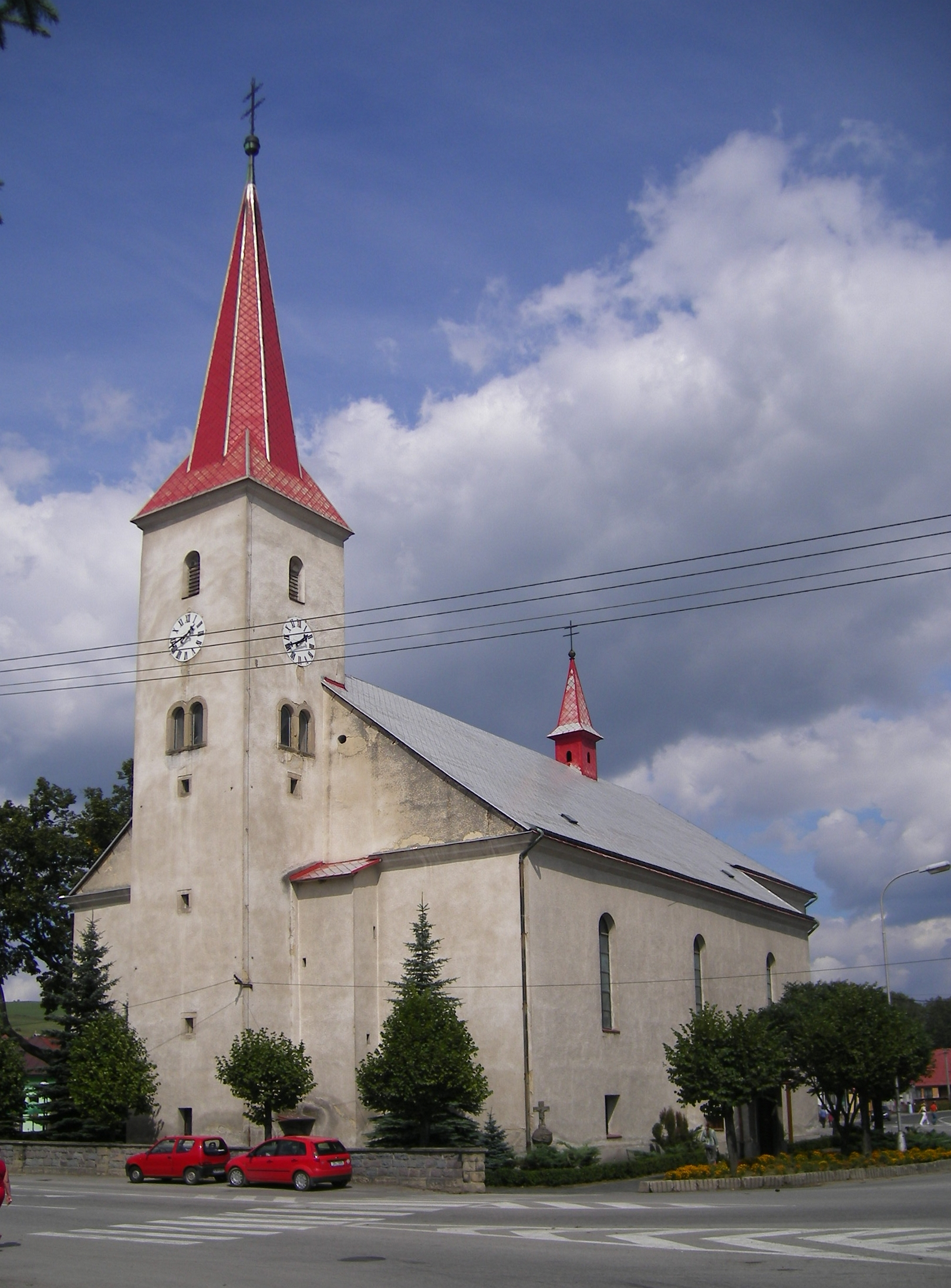
Most Holy Trinity Church, Tvrdosin

The Roman Catholic Church of the Most Holy Trinity in Tvrdošín, region Orava, Slovakia.

Original wooden church was built in first half of 17th century. The church was burned down few times. Current walled Most Holy Trinity Church was begun to build on 24 May 1766. From the original wooden church, only a tower (from 1628), a middle choir, an oratory and a sanctuary remained. The church was sanctified on 2 June 1770 on Most Holy Trinity day.

During the Second World War the church was targeted by mines. East part of roof was damaged, also the baroque altar. Innovation of left side baroque main altar was realized after 1945 by academic artist Ctibor Belan cooperate with benched master Jan Rakyta.

The church contains a monumental late-baroque altar, the Marian column (from late 18th century), the Sculpture of Saint John of Nepomuk (from late 18th century), and a folk sculpture of Saint Florian (from second half of 18th century).

== UPG Project ==
This church was modelled in 3D graphic program trueSpace.

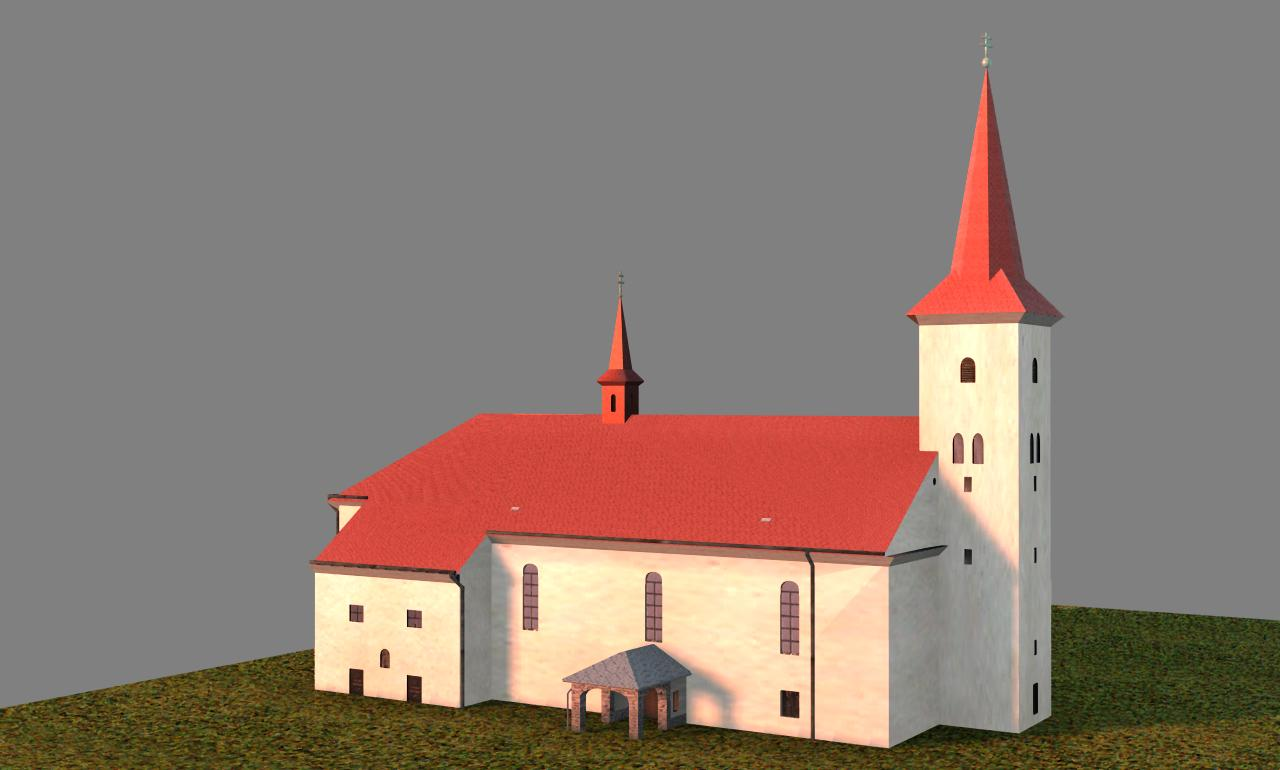

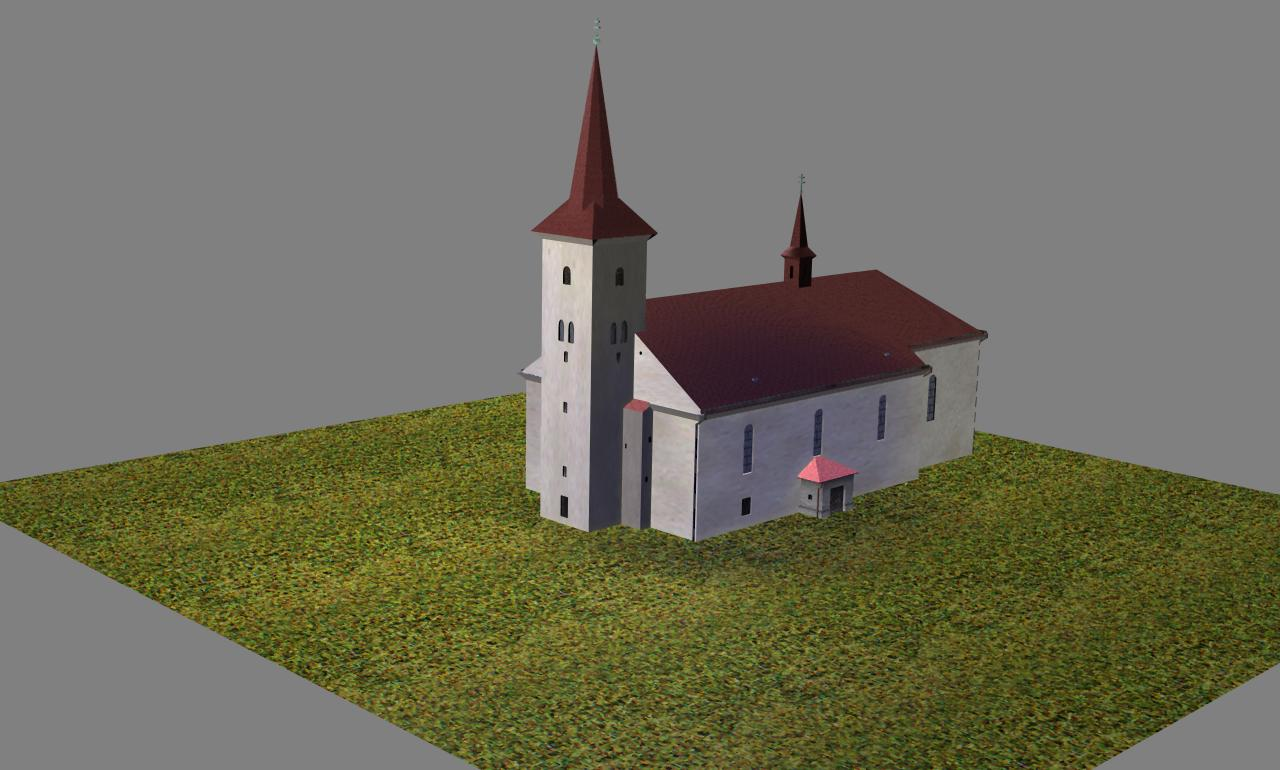

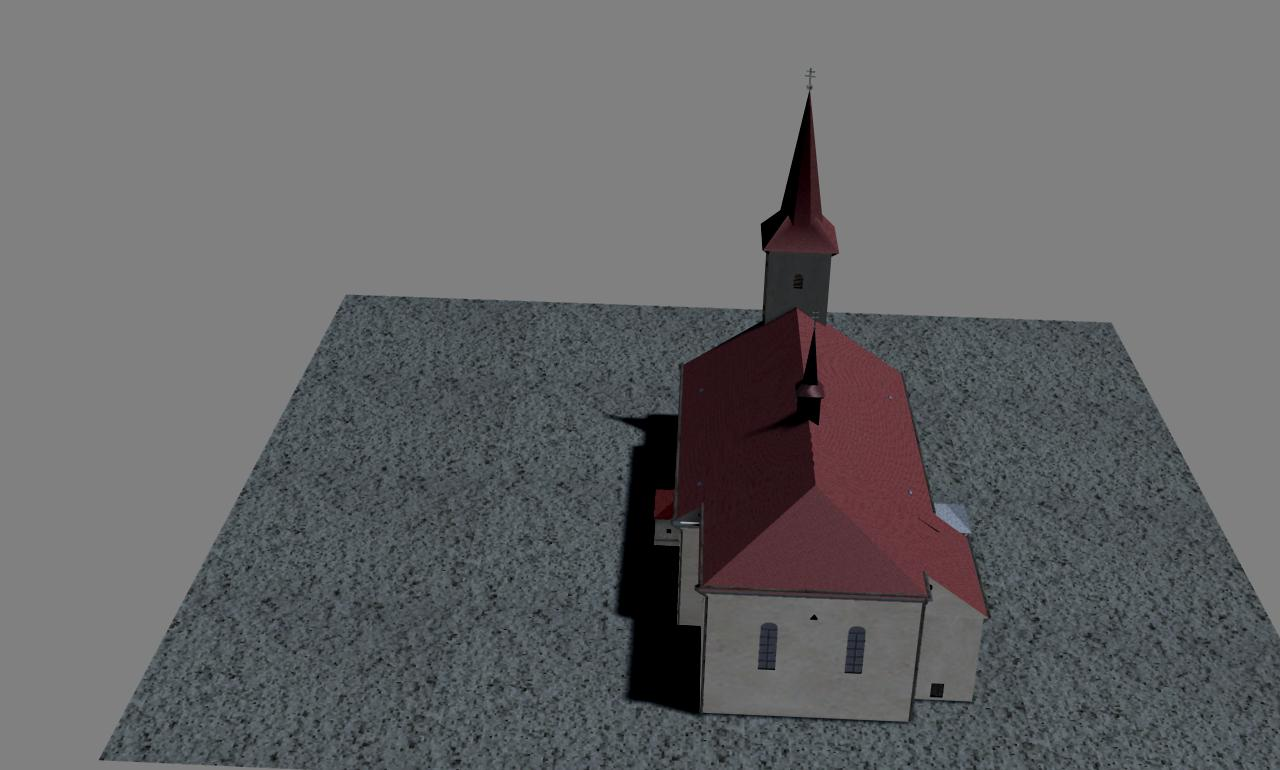

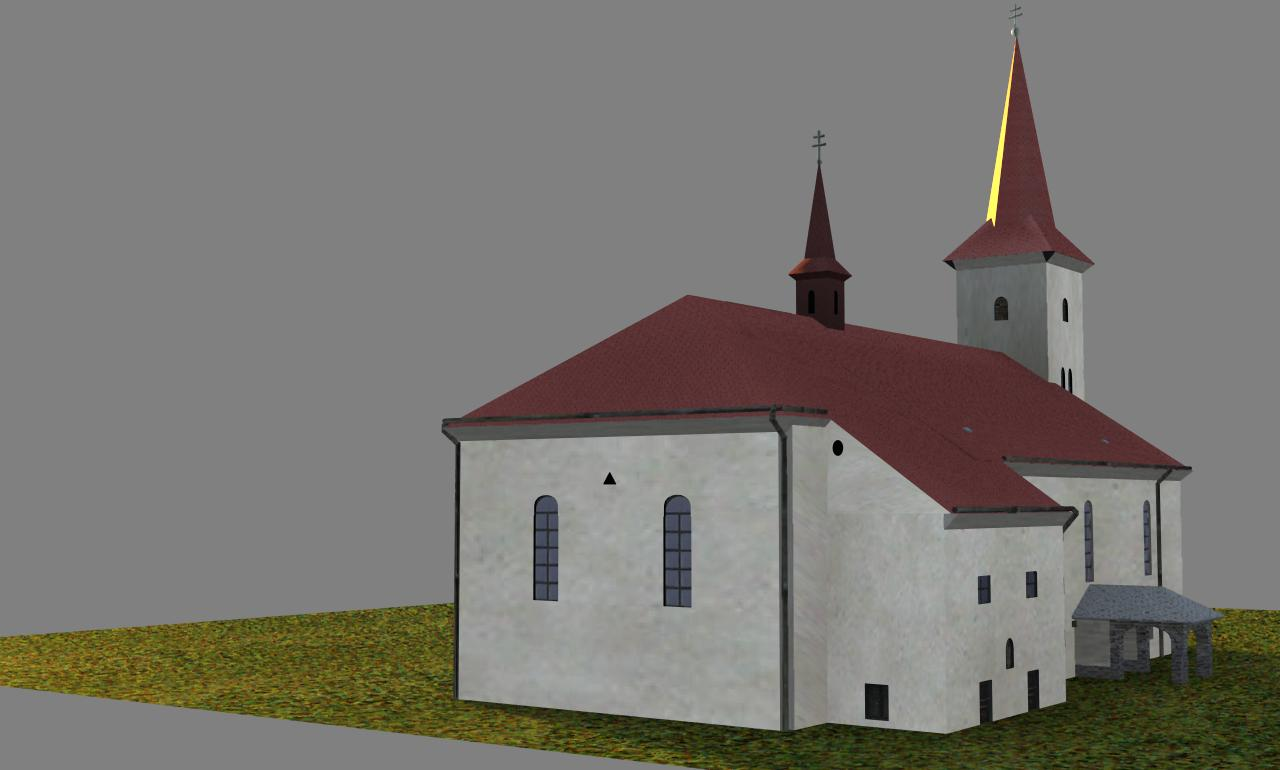
