= Zábiedovo =

Village and municipality in Slovakia

- Municipality
- Flag

- Location of Zábiedovo in the Žilina Region Location of Zábiedovo in Slovakia
- Coordinates: 49.32°N 19.62°E
- Country: Slovakia
- Region: Žilina Region
- District: Tvrdošín District
- First mentioned: 1567

Area
  - Total: 17.97 km^{2} (6.94 sq mi)
- Elevation: 668 m (2,192 ft)

Population (2025)
  - Total: 982
- Time zone: UTC+1 (CET)
  - Summer (DST): UTC+2 (CEST)
- Postal code: 280 1
- Area code: +421 43
- Vehicle registration plate (until 2022): TS
- Website: www.zabiedovo.sk

Zábiedovo (Hungarian: Zábidó) is a village and municipality in Tvrdošín District in the Žilina Region of northern Slovakia.

== History ==
In historical records the village was first mentioned in 1567.

== Geography ==
The municipality lies at an altitude of 668 metres (2,192 ft) and covers an area of 17.97 km^{2} (6.94 sq mi) (2025).

== Population ==
Population statistic (10 years)
Year	1995	2005	2015	2025
Count	757	796	842	982
Difference		+5.15%	+5.77%	+16.62%

Population statistic
Year	2024	2025
Count	978	982
Difference		+0.40%

It has a population of 982 people (31 December 2025).

=== Ethnicity ===
Census 2021 (1+ %)
Ethnicity	Number	Fraction
Slovak	893	99.22%
Total	900	

In year 2021 was 900 people by ethnicity 893 as Slovak, 6 as Polish, 5 as Other, 3 as Not found out and 1 as Czech.

Note on population: The difference values of population numbers in the table "Population statistic" and in the sections "Ethnicity" & "Religion" is caused by the use of various statistical methods.

=== Religion ===
Census 2021 (1+ %)
Religion	Number	Fraction
Roman Catholic Church	849	94.33%
None	37	4.11%
Total	900	

In year 2021 was 900 people by religion 849 from Roman Catholic Church, 37 from None, 5 from Not found out, 3 from Christian Congregations in Slovakia, 2 from Other and not ascertained christian church, 2 from Greek Catholic Church and 2 from Evangelical Church.
