= Štefanov nad Oravou =

- Municipality
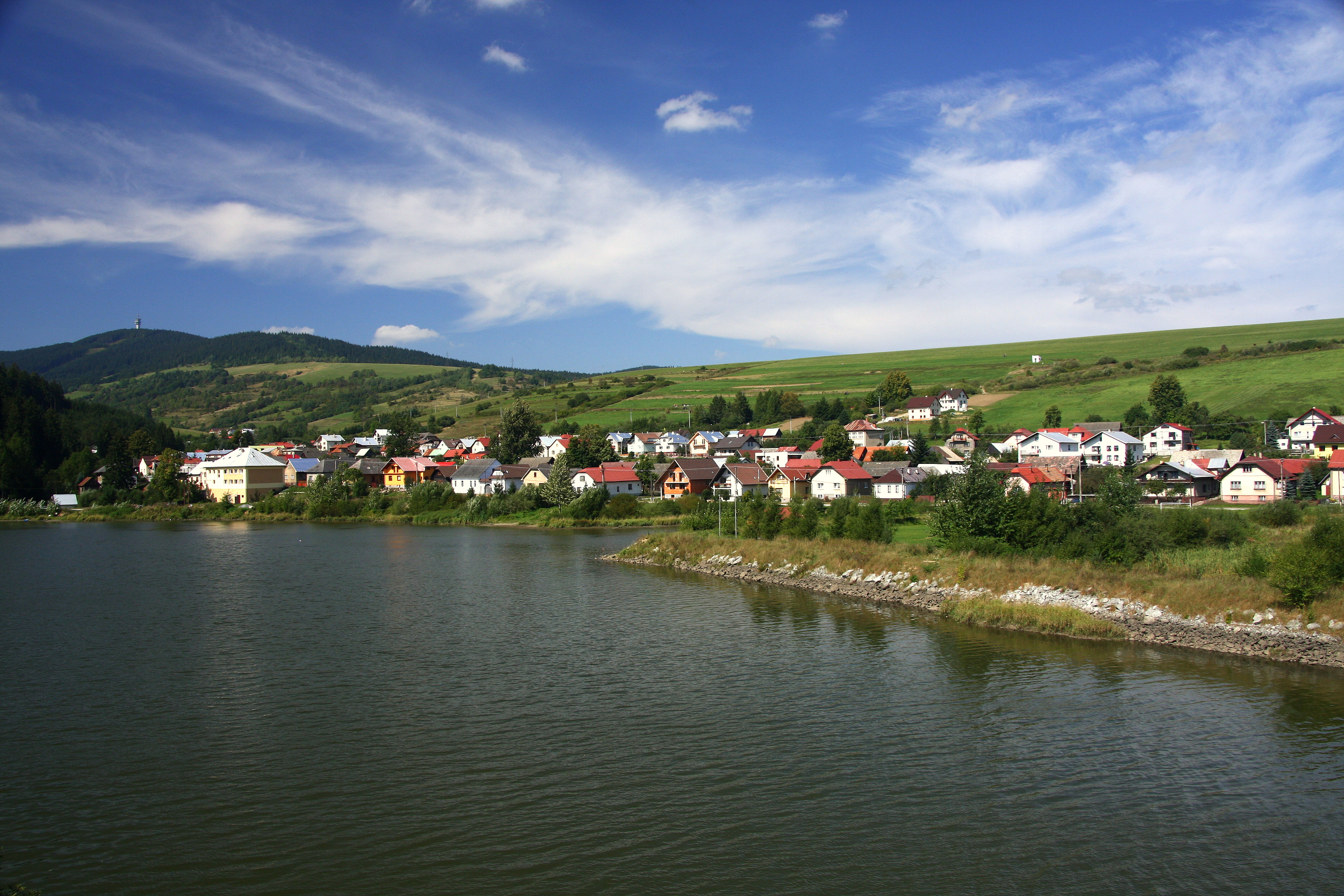

- Flag

- Location of Štefanov nad Oravou in the Žilina Region Location of Štefanov nad Oravou in Slovakia
- Coordinates: 49.36°N 19.52°E
- Country: Slovakia
- Region: Žilina Region
- District: Tvrdošín District
- First mentioned: 1355

Area
  - Total: 12.34 km^{2} (4.76 sq mi)
- Elevation: 614 m (2,014 ft)

Population (2025)
  - Total: 706
- Time zone: UTC+1 (CET)
  - Summer (DST): UTC+2 (CEST)
- Postal code: 274 4
- Area code: +421 43
- Vehicle registration plate (until 2022): TS
- Website: www.stefanovnadoravou.sk

Štefanov nad Oravou (Hungarian: Stepanó) is a village and municipality in Tvrdošín District in the Žilina Region of northern Slovakia.

== History ==
In historical records the village was first mentioned in 1355.

== Geography ==
The municipality lies at an altitude of 614 metres (2,014 ft) and covers an area of 12.34 km^{2} (4.76 sq mi) (2025).

== Population ==
Population statistic (10 years)
Year	1995	2005	2015	2025
Count	554	603	676	706
Difference		+8.84%	+12.10%	+4.43%

Population statistic
Year	2024	2025
Count	700	706
Difference		+0.85%

It has a population of 706 people (31 December 2025).

=== Ethnicity ===
Census 2021 (1+ %)
Ethnicity	Number	Fraction
Slovak	689	98.85%
Not found out	11	1.57%
Total	697	

In year 2021 was 697 people by ethnicity 689 as Slovak, 11 as Not found out, 3 as Czech, 3 as Other and 1 as Polish.

Note on population: The difference values of population numbers in the table "Population statistic" and in the sections "Ethnicity" & "Religion" is caused by the use of various statistical methods.

=== Religion ===
Census 2021 (1+ %)
Religion	Number	Fraction
Roman Catholic Church	642	92.11%
None	38	5.45%
Not found out	11	1.58%
Total	697	

In year 2021 was 697 people by religion 642 from Roman Catholic Church, 38 from None, 11 from Not found out, 4 from Greek Catholic Church, 1 from Calvinist Church and 1 from Evangelical Church.
