= Chabówka =

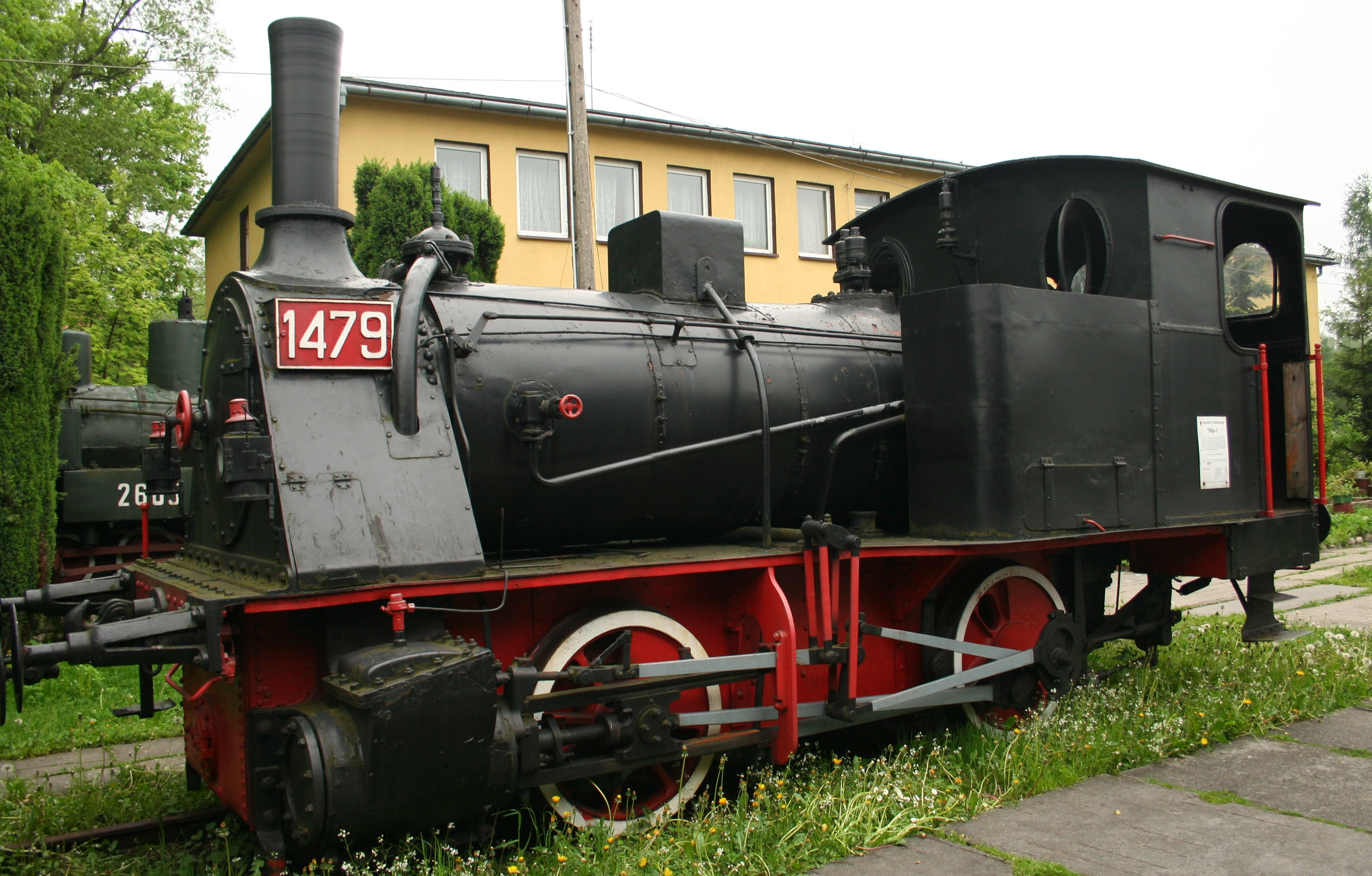
- Locomotive museum

- Location within Poland
- Coordinates: 49°36′N 19°56′E
- Country: Poland
- Voivodeship: Lesser Poland
- County: Nowy Targ
- Gmina: Rabka-Zdrój
- Elevation: 502 m (1,647 ft)

Population (2006)
  - Total: 1,600
- Time zone: UTC+1 (CET)
  - Summer (DST): UTC+2 (CEST)
- Postal code: 34-720
- Area code: +48 18
- Car plates: KNT
- Website: www.chabowka.info

Chabówka [xaˈbufka] is a village located on the outskirts of the southern Polish town of Rabka, in the Nowy Targ County, Lesser Poland Voivodeship. With population of 1,600 (as for 2006), Chabówka is a popular tourist attraction because of its location near the Gorce Mountains featuring Gorce National Park.

It also is an important rail junction, situated along the main line from Kraków to Zakopane, with another connection, to Nowy Sącz, beginning in Chabówka. Near the rail station there is a railway museum, with many examples of Polish-operated locomotives and rail cars.

Chabówka shares its name with the northern Slovak village and municipality of Habovka in the Žilina Region. This is because the first settlers of Habovka came from the Polish village of Chabówka, which lent the new settlement its name.

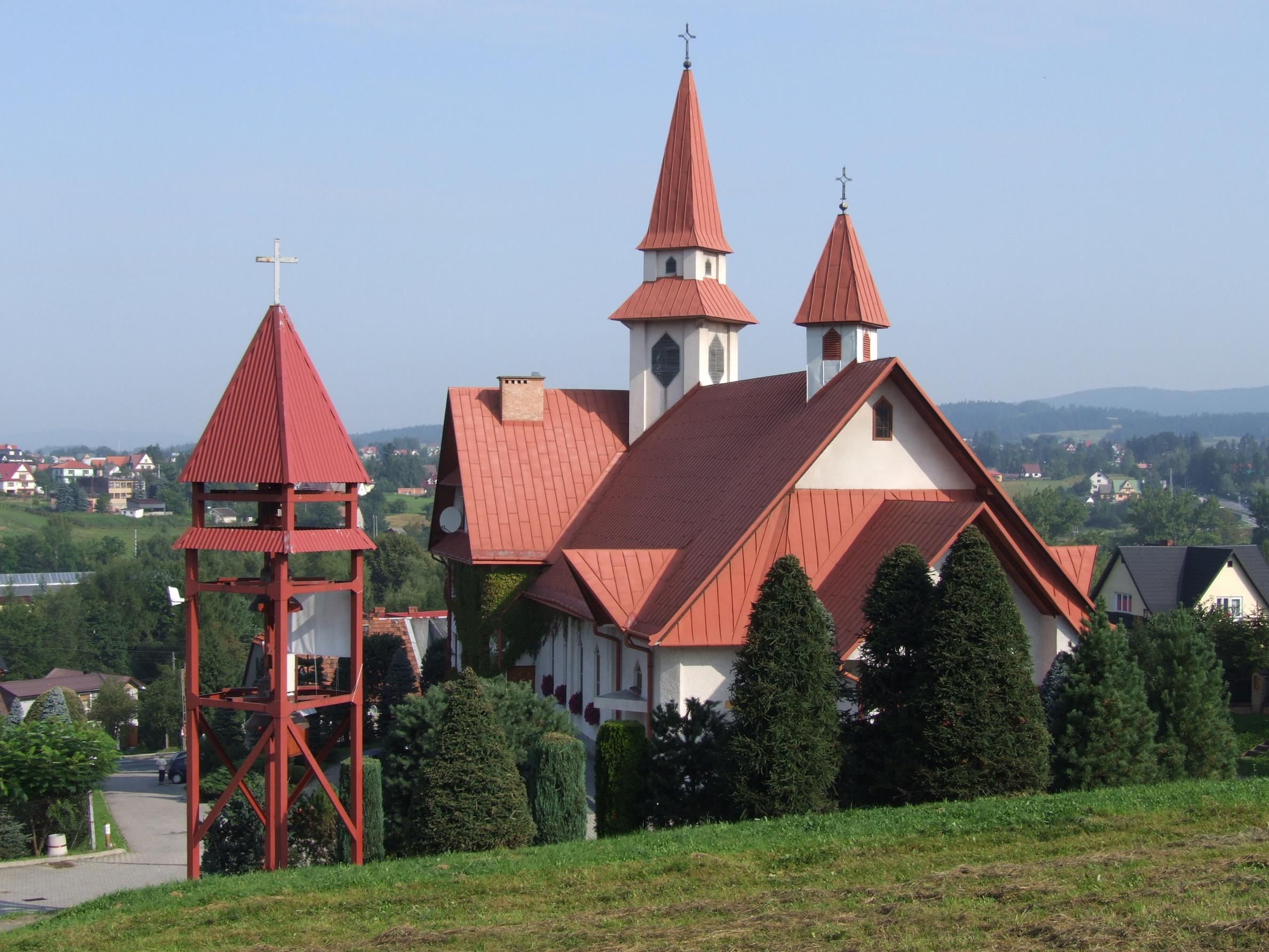
Church of St. Brother Albert built in 1994
