= Nižná, Tvrdošín District =

Nižná
- Municipality
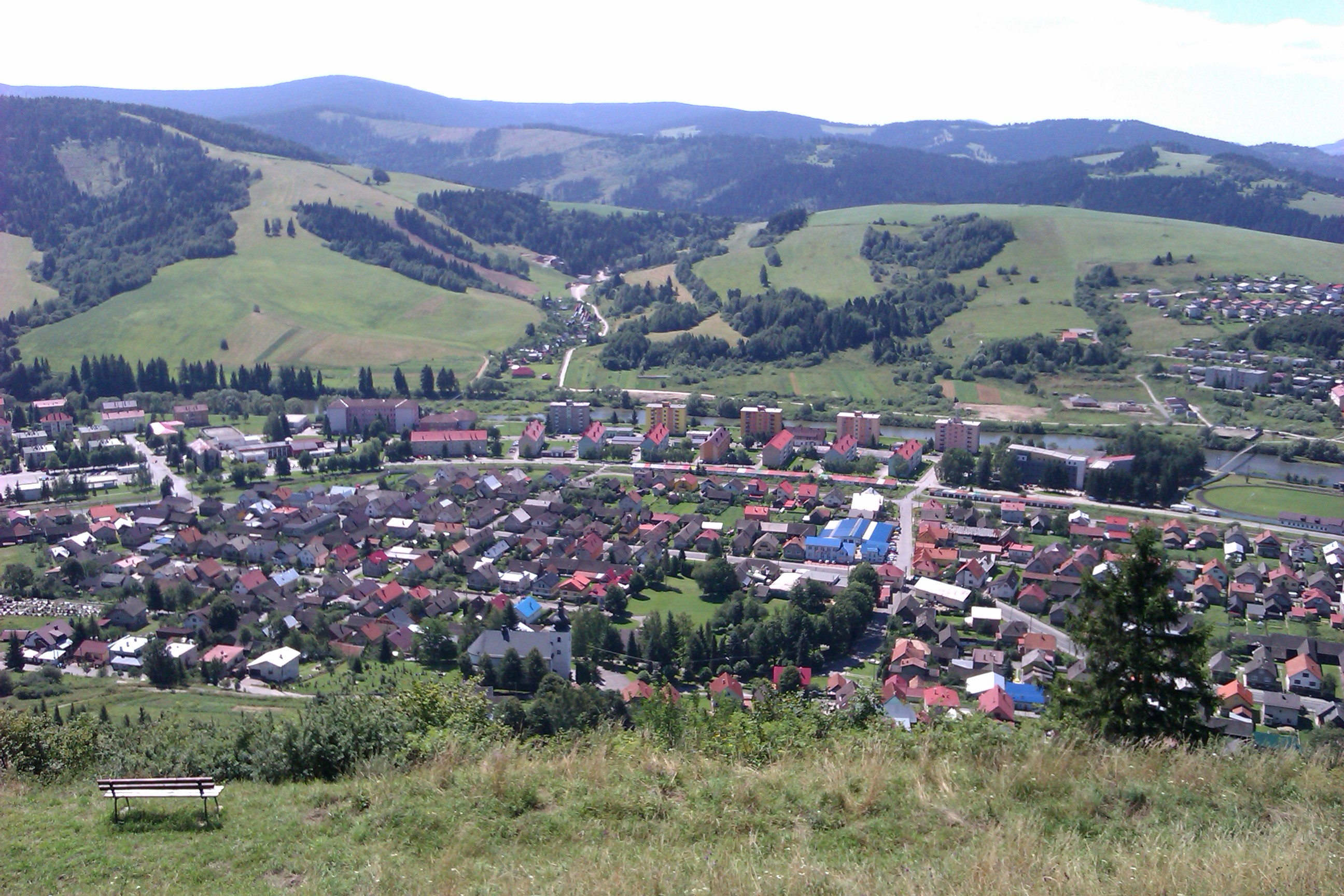

- Flag Coat of arms

- Location of Nižná in the Žilina Region Location of Nižná in Slovakia
- Coordinates: 49°18′37″N 19°31′48″E
- Country: Slovakia
- Region: Žilina Region
- District: Tvrdošín District
- First mentioned: 1420

Area
  - Total: 27.77 km^{2} (10.72 sq mi)
- Elevation: 584 m (1,916 ft)

Population (2025)
  - Total: 3,929
- Time zone: UTC+1 (CET)
  - Summer (DST): UTC+2 (CEST)
- Postal code: 274 3
- Area code: +421 43
- Vehicle registration plate (until 2022): TS
- Website: www.nizna.sk

Nižná (Hungarian: Nizsna) is a village and municipality in Tvrdošín District in the Žilina Region of northern Slovakia.

== History ==
In historical records the village was first mentioned in 1420 as Nissne Wes.

== Geography ==
The municipality lies at an altitude of 584 metres (1,916 ft) and covers an area of 27.77 km^{2} (10.72 sq mi) (2025).

== Population ==
Population statistic (10 years)
| Year | 1995 | 2005 | 2015 | 2025 |
|---|---|---|---|---|
| Count | 3951 | 4067 | 4009 | 3929 |
| Difference | | +2.93% | −1.42% | −1.99% |

Population statistic
| Year | 2024 | 2025 |
|---|---|---|
| Count | 3918 | 3929 |
| Difference | | +0.28% |

It has a population of 3929 people (31 December 2025).

=== Ethnicity ===
Census 2021 (1+ %)
| Ethnicity | Number | Fraction |
|---|---|---|
| Slovak | 3706 | 94.15% |
| Not found out | 229 | 5.81% |
| Total | 3936 | |

In year 2021 was 3936 people by ethnicity 3706 as Slovak, 229 as Not found out, 20 as Czech, 19 as Other, 8 as Polish, 7 as German, 4 as Hungarian, 3 as Russian, 2 as Jewish, 2 as Serbian, 2 as Romanian, 1 as Irish, 1 as Romani, 1 as Rusyn, 1 as Canadian, 1 as French and 1 as English.

Note on population: The difference values of population numbers in the table "Population statistic" and in the sections "Ethnicity" & "Religion" is caused by the use of various statistical methods.

=== Religion ===
Census 2021 (1+ %)
| Religion | Number | Fraction |
|---|---|---|
| Roman Catholic Church | 3138 | 79.73% |
| None | 477 | 12.12% |
| Not found out | 211 | 5.36% |
| Evangelical Church | 57 | 1.45% |
| Total | 3936 | |

In year 2021 was 3936 people by religion 3138 from Roman Catholic Church, 477 from None, 211 from Not found out, 57 from Evangelical Church, 15 from Greek Catholic Church, 13 from Ad hoc movements, 8 from Other and not ascertained christian church, 6 from Other, 4 from Christian Congregations in Slovakia, 3 from Calvinist Church, 2 from Jehovah's Witnesses, 1 from United Methodist Church and 1 from Bahá'i Community.

== Twin towns – sister cities ==
Nižná is twinned with:

- Horní Suchá, Czech Republic
- Mszana Dolna, Poland
