= Darina Laščiaková =

Slovak folk singer and ethnographer (1931–2026)

- Born: Darina Gažová; 23 November 1931; Tvrdošín, Czechoslovakia
- Died: 12 August 2026 (aged 94) Slovakia
- Education: Comenius University
- Genres: Slovak folk music
- Occupations: Singer; ethnographer; radio editor
- Instrument: Vocals
- Years active: 1951–2000s
- Labels: Opus, Slovak Radio Records
- Awards: Pribina Cross, 1st Class (2013)

Darina Laščiaková (née Gažová; 23 November 1931 – 12 August 2026) was a Slovak folk singer, ethnographer and radio editor. Over a career of more than four decades at Czechoslovak Radio and its Slovak successor, she combined field collection of traditional song with her own performance of it, and became one of the best-known voices of Slovak folk music.

A native of the Orava region, Laščiaková joined the radio's folk music desk in 1961 and remained there for some thirty-three years, travelling across Slovakia with a tape recorder to record singers and instrumentalists in their own villages. The recordings she brought back form a substantial part of the Slovak Radio archive of authentic musical folklore.She was also a prolific broadcaster, best known for the cycle Hory, ľudia a pieseň ("Mountains, People and Song"), and recorded extensively as a singer, particularly of lyrical and wedding songs from Orava.

== Early life and education ==
Laščiaková was born in Tvrdošín in northern Orava on 23 November 1931. According to accounts of her childhood, she first sang in public at around two and a half years old, and was paid with a glass of raspberry cordial.

After completing secondary school in Trstená, she studied musicology and ethnology at the Faculty of Arts of Comenius University in Bratislava, graduating in the mid-1950s with a thesis on the musical culture of the Gorals of northern Orava.

While still a student she was a member and soloist of the folk ensemble Lúčnica, between 1951 and 1954. She later performed with the radio ensemble of Folk Artistic Creativity (Ľudová umelecká tvorivosť) and as a soloist with the radio's Orchestra of Folk Instruments (OĽUN).

== Radio career ==
Laščiaková worked for the Regional National Committee in Bratislava from 1959 to 1961 before joining the folk music editorial department of Czechoslovak Radio in Bratislava in 1961, where she remained for 33 years until her retirement.

She wrote and edited a large number of programmes on folk song and music, frequently appearing in them as a performer. Her recurring series included Hory, ľudia a pieseň ("Mountains, People and Song"), which portrayed life in Slovakia's mountain regions; Listujeme v zbierkach ľudových piesní; Večery pri ľudovej hudbe; Zberatelia ľudových piesní; Známi interpreti ľudových piesní; Piesne moje, piesne; Z mojej domoviny; and Ako interpretovať ľudovú pieseň. For roughly two decades she also presented live radio broadcasts from the Východná Folklore Festival.

Her field work took her across almost all of Slovakia. Her collecting activity coincided with rapid change in Slovak rural life, so that the archive she helped build preserved not only songs but regional variants, dialects and performance practice that would otherwise have survived only in memory.

== Singing and recordings ==
Laščiaková recorded many of the songs she had collected in the radio studio, working with folk bands and orchestras including those of Eugen Farkaš, Miroslav Dudík and Rinaldo Oláh, the Slovak Radio Orchestra of Folk Instruments, the ensemble of Slávek Volavý from Moravia, and the Brno Radio Orchestra of Folk Instruments. Her singing was characterised by naturalness and a feeling for the lyrical folk song; among her best-known recordings are Svadobná odobierka, Zahrajte mi tichúčko, Šípová ružička and Uspávanka. The Orava wedding farewell song Zbohom ostávajte, mamičkine prahy became particularly closely associated with her.

She also appeared in several films, including Rodná zem (1953), Balada o Vojtovej Maríne (1964), Kubo (1965) and Môj vienok zelený (1968), and performed in concert both in Czechoslovakia and abroad. In 2005 she published a memoir, Život s piesňou ("A Life with Song"), recounting her collecting journeys and her Orava childhood.

== Death and legacy ==
Laščiaková died on 12 August 2026, at the age of 94; her death was confirmed by her granddaughter Simona Frantová. President of Slovakia Peter Pellegrini said that the country had lost an exceptional figure whose life was bound up with song and tradition, and noted that she had not merely performed Slovak folk culture but had spent decades seeking it out, recording it and helping to preserve it.

Her long-time colleague, the ethnomusicologist Ondrej Demo, summarised her career by saying that she devoted her life to singing and that folk songs became her lifelong companions.

== Awards and honours ==
- Crystal Wing (Krištáľové krídlo), special award, 2009
- Pribina Cross, 1st Class, conferred by President Ivan Gašparovič, 2013

== Selected discography ==
- Spieva Darina Laščiaková (1971)
- Ej pod Roháčom žijem (1971)
- Oravienka (1973)
- Tichá noc / Uspávanka (1973)
- Svadobné piesne (1974)
- Beliže mi, beli (1976)
- Kopala studienku (1977)
- Tichučko vám zaspievam (1985)
- Vianoce s Darinou Laščiakovou (1989)
- Betlehemská hviezda (with Hana Hulejová)
- Na kamenečku sedela (2003)
- Kopala studienku / Tichučko Vám zaspievam (2 CD, 2010)

Compilations on which she appears include Vianočné spevy a koledy / Christmas Songs and Carols (1989), Prekrásne Slovensko / Beautiful Slovakia (1993), Môj vienok zelený (2003), Poďme bratia do Betléma (2004) and Naj Retro Vianoce (2007).
