= Hladovka =

- Municipality
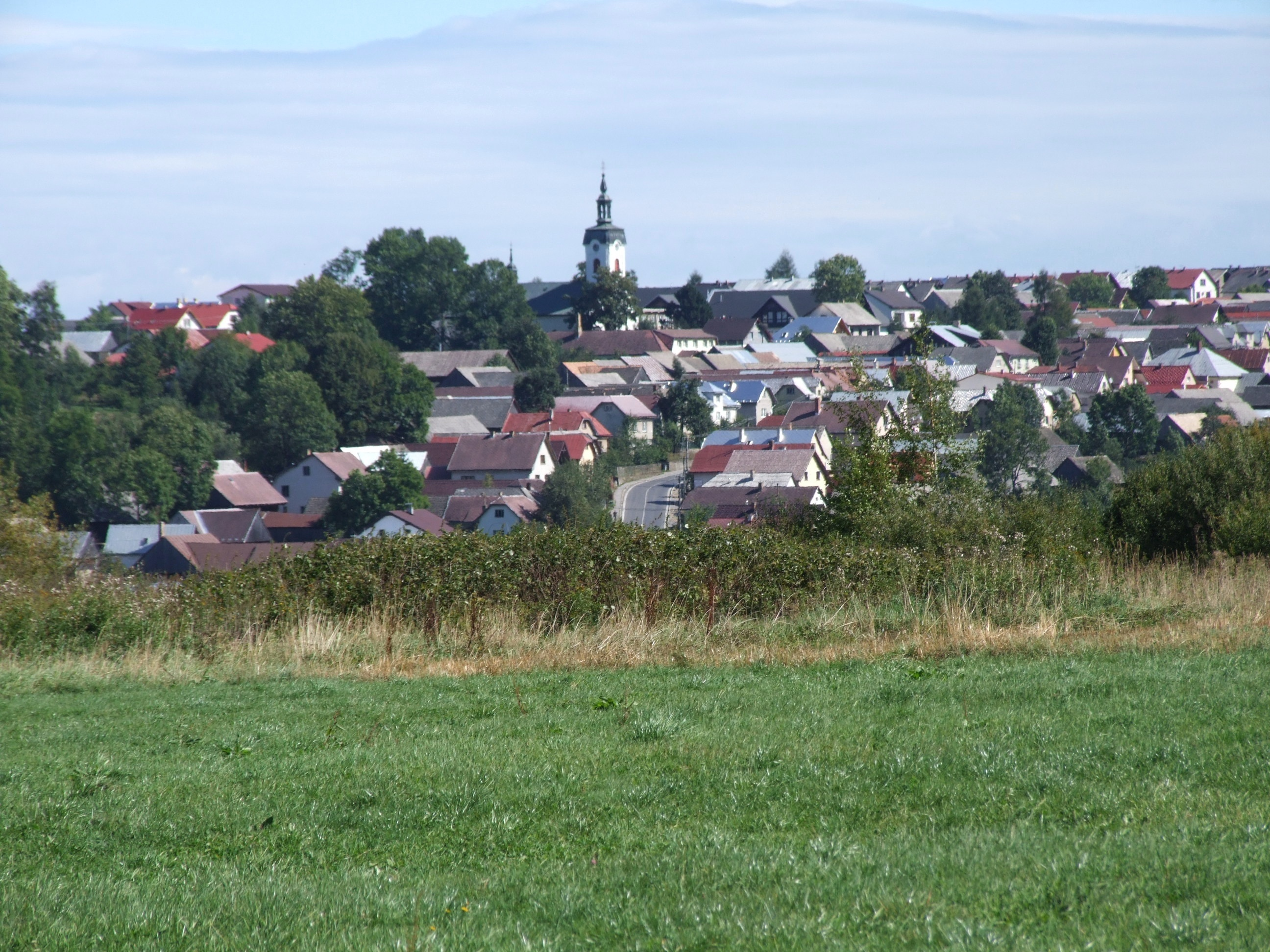

- Flag

- Location of Hladovka in the Žilina Region Location of Hladovka in Slovakia
- Coordinates: 49.37°N 19.77°E
- Country: Slovakia
- Region: Žilina Region
- District: Tvrdošín District
- First mentioned: 1598

Area
  - Total: 18.09 km^{2} (6.98 sq mi)
- Elevation: 747 m (2,451 ft)

Population (2025)
  - Total: 1,093
- Time zone: UTC+1 (CET)
  - Summer (DST): UTC+2 (CEST)
- Postal code: 271 3
- Area code: +421 43
- Vehicle registration plate (until 2022): TS
- Website: hladovka.orava.sk

Hladovka (Polish: Głodówka, Goral: Glodōvka) is a village and municipality in Tvrdošín District in the Žilina Region of northern Slovakia.

== History ==
In historical records the village was first mentioned in 1598. Until 1918/20 it belonged to Hungary, 1920-1924 and 1938–1939 to Poland, 1939–1945 to Slovakia, 1945–1993 to Czechoslovakia.

== Geography ==
The municipality lies at an altitude of 747 metres (2,451 ft) and covers an area of 18.09 km^{2} (6.98 sq mi) (2025).

== Population ==
Population statistic (10 years)
Year	1995	2005	2015	2025
Count	884	951	1040	1093
Difference		+7.57%	+9.35%	+5.09%

Population statistic
Year	2024	2025
Count	1098	1093
Difference		−0.45%

It has a population of 1093 people (31 December 2025).

=== Ethnicity ===
Census 2021 (1+ %)
Ethnicity	Number	Fraction
Slovak	1037	99.04%
Not found out	98	9.36%
Total	1047	

In year 2021 was 1047 people by ethnicity 1037 as Slovak, 98 as Not found out, 9 as Polish, 2 as Czech, 2 as German, 2 as Other and 1 as Rusyn.

Note on population: The difference values of population numbers in the table "Population statistic" and in the sections "Ethnicity" & "Religion" is caused by the use of various statistical methods.

=== Religion ===
Census 2021 (1+ %)
Religion	Number	Fraction
Roman Catholic Church	1031	98.47%
Total	1047	

In year 2021 was 1047 people by religion 1031 from Roman Catholic Church, 9 from None, 2 from Calvinist Church, 2 from Not found out, 1 from Other and not ascertained christian church, 1 from Greek Catholic Church and 1 from Evangelical Church.

== Genealogical resources ==
The records for genealogical research are available at the state archive "Statny Archiv in Bytca, Slovakia"

- Roman Catholic church records (births/marriages/deaths): 1763-1893 (parish A)

== See also ==
- List of municipalities and towns in Slovakia
