= Tvrdošín District =

Coordinates: 49°20′1″N 19°33′18″E

- District
- Country: Slovakia
- Region (kraj): Žilina Region
- Cultural region: Orava
- Seat: Tvrdošín

Area
  - Total: 478.92 km^{2} (184.91 sq mi)

Population (2025)
  - Total: 35,667
- Time zone: UTC+1 (CET)
  - Summer (DST): UTC+2 (CEST)
- Telephone prefix: 43
- Vehicle registration plate (until 2022): TS
- Municipalities: 15

Tvrdošín District (okres Tvrdošín) is a district in the Žilina Region of central Slovakia. The district was first established in 1996; in 1923 it had been a part of Trstená District.

== Population ==
Population statistic (10 years)
Year	1995	2005	2015	2025
Count	33,882	35,608	35,995	35,667
Difference		+5.09%	+1.08%	−0.91%

Population statistic
Year	2024	2025
Count	35,749	35,667
Difference		−0.22%

It has a population of 35,667 people (31 December 2025).

Historical population
Year	Pop.	±%
1970	23,046	—
1980	28,464	+23.5%
1991	32,333	+13.6%
2001	35,062	+8.4%
2011	35,829	+2.2%
2021	35,856	+0.1%
Source: Statistical Office of the Slovak Republic

=== Ethnicity ===
Census 2021 (1+ %)
Ethnicity	Number	Fraction
Slovak	34,800	94.94%
Not found out	1210	3.3%
Total	36,652	

In year 2021 was 36,652 people by ethnicity 34,800 as Slovak, 1210 as Not found out, 174 as Czech, 166 as Polish, 123 as Other, 38 as Russian, 22 as German, 17 as Hungarian, 15 as Ukrainian, 15 as Rusyn, 12 as Romani, 9 as Serbian, 7 as Bulgarian, 7 as English, 5 as Irish, 5 as Moravian, 4 as Jewish, 4 as Italian, 4 as Romanian, 3 as Canadian, 3 as Greek, 3 as French, 2 as Austrian, 1 as Chinese, 1 as Vietnamese, 1 as Silesian and 1 as Croatian.

Note on population: The difference values of population numbers in the table "Population statistic" and in the sections "Ethnicity" & "Religion" is caused by the use of various statistical methods.

=== Religion ===
Census 2021 (1+ %)
Religion	Number	Fraction
Roman Catholic Church	31,309	87.32%
None	2879	8.03%
Not found out	901	2.51%
Total	35,856	

In year 2021 was 35,856 people by religion 31,309 from Roman Catholic Church, 2879 from None, 901 from Not found out, 238 from Evangelical Church, 114 from Greek Catholic Church, 94 from Ad hoc movements, 69 from Christian Congregations in Slovakia, 49 from Jehovah's Witnesses, 47 from Other, 42 from Other and not ascertained christian church, 27 from Eastern Orthodox Church, 19 from Calvinist Church, 16 from Paganism and natural spirituality, 15 from Islam, 14 from Buddhism, 5 from United Methodist Church, 5 from Church of Jesus Christ of Latter-day Saints, 3 from Seventh-day Adventist Church, 3 from Apostolic Church, 2 from Old Catholic Church, 1 from Jewish community, 1 from Hinduism, 1 from Church of the Brethren, 1 from Baptists Church and 1 from Bahá'i Community.

== Municipalities ==
Municipality	Area [km^{2}]	Population
Brezovica	19.22	1,435
Čimhová	6.38	701
Habovka	29.15	1,357
Hladovka	18.09	1,093
Liesek	30.90	3,133
Nižná	27.77	3,929
Oravský Biely Potok	18.44	768
Podbiel	19.29	1,338
Suchá Hora	21.85	1,495
Štefanov nad Oravou	12.34	706
Trstená	82.53	6,900
Tvrdošín	56.45	8,579
Vitanová	45.92	1,325
Zábiedovo	17.97	982
Zuberec	72.31	1,926

Population and area values are current for year 2025.
