= Brezovica, Tvrdošín District =

Brezovica
- Municipality
- Flag

- Location of Brezovica in the Žilina Region Location of Brezovica in Slovakia
- Coordinates: 49.3408°N 19.6519°E
- Country: Slovakia
- Region: Žilina Region
- District: Tvrdošín District
- First mentioned: 1580

Area
  - Total: 19.22 km^{2} (7.42 sq mi)
- Elevation: 720 m (2,360 ft)

Population (2025)
  - Total: 1,435
- Time zone: UTC+1 (CET)
  - Summer (DST): UTC+2 (CEST)
- Postal code: 280 1
- Area code: +421 43
- Vehicle registration plate (until 2022): TS
- Website: www.brezovica.sk

Brezovica (Polish: Brzozowica, Hungarian: Brezovica) is a village and municipality in Tvrdošín District in the Žilina Region of northern Slovakia.

== History ==
In historical records the village was first mentioned in 1580.

== Geography ==
The municipality lies at an altitude of 720 metres (2,360 ft) and covers an area of 19.22 km^{2} (7.42 sq mi) (2025).

== Population ==
Population statistic (10 years)
Year	1995	2005	2015	2025
Count	1221	1298	1321	1435
Difference		+6.30%	+1.77%	+8.62%

Population statistic
Year	2024	2025
Count	1419	1435
Difference		+1.12%

It has a population of 1435 people (31 December 2025).

=== Ethnicity ===
Census 2021 (1+ %)
Ethnicity	Number	Fraction
Slovak	1359	99.41%
Total	1367	

In year 2021 was 1367 people by ethnicity 1359 as Slovak, 13 as Not found out, 3 as Other, 1 as Rusyn, 1 as Polish, 1 as German and 1 as Hungarian.

Note on population: The difference values of population numbers in the table "Population statistic" and in the sections "Ethnicity" & "Religion" is caused by the use of various statistical methods.

=== Religion ===
Census 2021 (1+ %)
Religion	Number	Fraction
Roman Catholic Church	1303	95.32%
None	48	3.51%
Total	1367	

In year 2021 was 1367 people by religion 1303 from Roman Catholic Church, 48 from None, 5 from Not found out, 5 from Greek Catholic Church, 4 from Ad hoc movements, 1 from Christian Congregations in Slovakia and 1 from Seventh-day Adventist Church.

== Genealogical resources ==
The records for genealogical research are available at the state archive "Statny Archiv in Bytca, Slovakia"

- Roman Catholic church records (births/marriages/deaths): 1763-1899 (parish B)

== See also ==
- List of municipalities and towns in Slovakia
