= Oravský Biely Potok =

Village and municipality in Slovakia

- Municipality
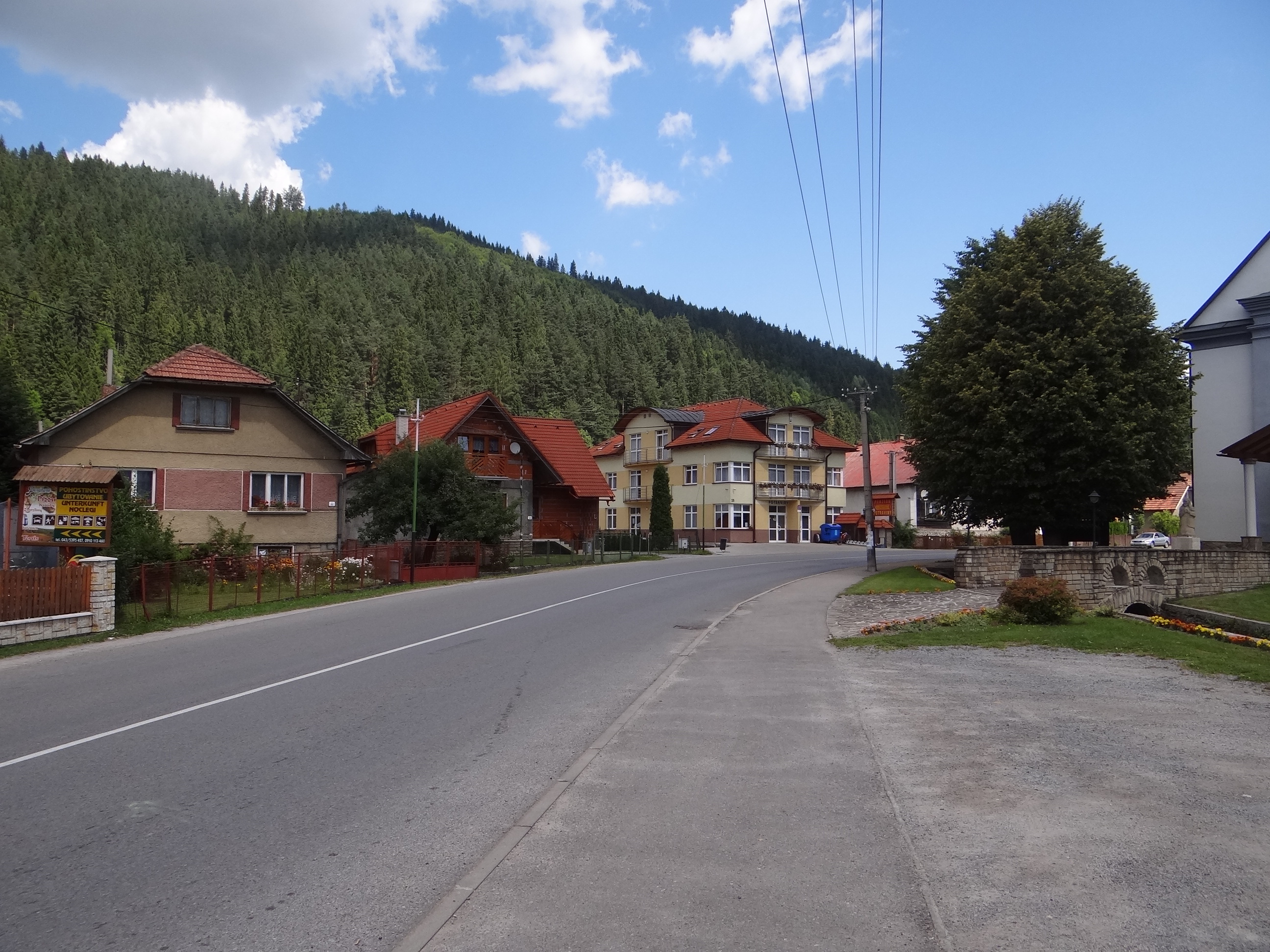

- Flag

- Location of Oravský Biely Potok in the Žilina Region Location of Oravský Biely Potok in Slovakia
- Coordinates: 49.28°N 19.55°E
- Country: Slovakia
- Region: Žilina Region
- District: Tvrdošín District
- First mentioned: 1567

Area
  - Total: 18.44 km^{2} (7.12 sq mi)
- Elevation: 649 m (2,129 ft)

Population (2025)
  - Total: 768
- Time zone: UTC+1 (CET)
  - Summer (DST): UTC+2 (CEST)
- Postal code: 274 2
- Area code: +421 43
- Vehicle registration plate (until 2022): TS
- Website: www.oravskybielypotok.sk

Oravský Biely Potok (Hungarian: Árvafejérpatak) is a village and municipality in Tvrdošín District in the Žilina Region of northern Slovakia.

== History ==
In historical records the village was first mentioned in 1567.

== Geography ==
The municipality lies at an altitude of 649 metres (2,129 ft) and covers an area of 18.44 km^{2} (7.12 sq mi) (2025).

== Population ==
Population statistic (10 years)
Year	1995	2005	2015	2025
Count	568	624	712	768
Difference		+9.85%	+14.10%	+7.86%

Population statistic
Year	2024	2025
Count	760	768
Difference		+1.05%

It has a population of 768 people (31 December 2025).

=== Ethnicity ===
Census 2021 (1+ %)
Ethnicity	Number	Fraction
Slovak	725	97.97%
Polish	8	1.08%
Total	740	

In year 2021 was 740 people by ethnicity 725 as Slovak, 8 as Polish, 7 as Not found out, 5 as Russian, 2 as Other and 1 as Czech.

Note on population: The difference values of population numbers in the table "Population statistic" and in the sections "Ethnicity" & "Religion" is caused by the use of various statistical methods.

=== Religion ===
Census 2021 (1+ %)
Religion	Number	Fraction
Roman Catholic Church	693	93.65%
None	28	3.78%
Total	740	

In year 2021 was 740 people by religion 693 from Roman Catholic Church, 28 from None, 5 from Not found out, 4 from Evangelical Church, 2 from Eastern Orthodox Church, 2 from Other, 2 from Greek Catholic Church, 2 from Ad hoc movements, 1 from Calvinist Church and 1 from Christian Congregations in Slovakia.
