= Tvrdošín =

- Municipality
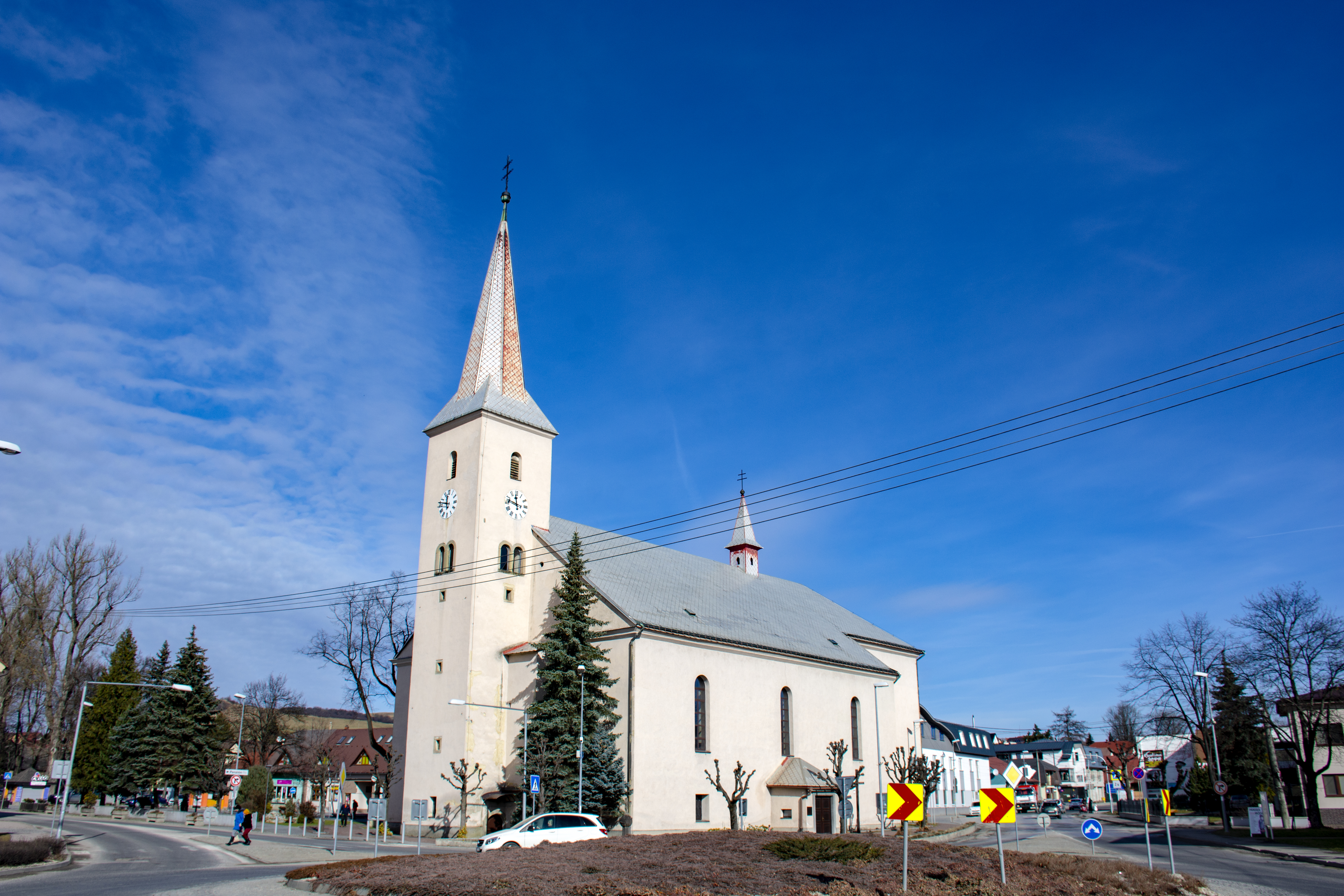
- Most Holy Trinity Church, Tvrdošín

- Flag Coat of arms

- Location of Tvrdošín in the Žilina Region Location of Tvrdošín in Slovakia
- Coordinates: 49.33°N 19.55°E
- Country: Slovakia
- Region: Žilina Region
- District: Tvrdošín District
- First mentioned: 1265

Government
  - Mayor: Ivan Šaško

Area
  - Total: 56.45 km^{2} (21.80 sq mi)
- Elevation: 592 m (1,942 ft)

Population (2025)
  - Total: 8,579
- Time zone: UTC+1 (CET)
  - Summer (DST): UTC+2 (CEST)
- Postal code: 274 4
- Area code: +421 43
- Vehicle registration plate (until 2022): TS
- Website: www.tvrdosin.sk

Tvrdošín (Hungarian: Turdossin; Polish: Twardoszyn) is a town in northern Slovakia.

== Geography ==
The municipality lies at an altitude of 592 metres (1,942 ft) and covers an area of 56.45 km^{2} (21.80 sq mi) (2025).

The town is located at the confluence of the Orava and Oravica rivers, 12 km (7 mi) from the Polish borders and cca. 32 km (20 mi) from Dolný Kubín. It consists of the boroughs of Krásna Hôrka, Medvedzie, and Tvrdošín.

== History ==
The town was mentioned in the Zobor documents in 1111 and in the Zobor Documents of Béla III of Hungary in 1183. It received royal free town privileges in 1369.

== Population ==
Population statistic (10 years)
Year	1995	2005	2015	2025
Count	9492	9429	9252	8579
Difference		−0.66%	−1.87%	−7.27%

Population statistic
Year	2024	2025
Count	8695	8579
Difference		−1.33%

It has a population of 8579 people (31 December 2025).

=== Ethnicity ===
Census 2021 (1+ %)
Ethnicity	Number	Fraction
Slovak	8619	96.28%
Not found out	296	3.3%
Total	8952	

In year 2021 was 8952 people by ethnicity 8619 as Slovak, 296 as Not found out, 65 as Czech, 38 as Polish, 22 as Other, 11 as Ukrainian, 11 as Russian, 9 as Romani, 7 as German, 6 as Rusyn, 4 as Hungarian, 4 as Bulgarian, 2 as Irish, 2 as Italian, 2 as Moravian, 2 as French, 1 as Jewish, 1 as Serbian and 1 as Romanian.

Note on population: The difference values of population numbers in the table "Population statistic" and in the sections "Ethnicity" & "Religion" is caused by the use of various statistical methods.

=== Religion ===
Census 2021 (1+ %)
Religion	Number	Fraction
Roman Catholic Church	7390	82.55%
None	996	11.13%
Not found out	296	3.31%
Total	8952	

In year 2021 was 8952 people by religion 7390 from Roman Catholic Church, 996 from None, 296 from Not found out, 88 from Evangelical Church, 31 from Greek Catholic Church, 31 from Ad hoc movements, 26 from Christian Congregations in Slovakia, 21 from Jehovah's Witnesses, 19 from Other, 13 from Other and not ascertained christian church, 12 from Eastern Orthodox Church, 9 from Paganism and natural spirituality, 8 from Buddhism, 3 from Calvinist Church, 3 from Islam, 2 from Church of Jesus Christ of Latter-day Saints, 1 from Old Catholic Church, 1 from Hinduism, 1 from United Methodist Church and 1 from Church of the Brethren.

According to the 2001 census, the town had 9,544 inhabitants. 99.03% of inhabitants were Slovaks, 0.53% Czechs and 0.19% Polish. The religious make-up was 92.10% Roman Catholics, 4.84% people with no religious affiliation and 1.18% Lutherans.

== Twin towns — Sister cities ==
Tvrdošín is twinned with:

- Kościelisko, Poland
- Kobylnica, Poland
- Durbuy, Belgium
- Orimattila, Finland
- Östhammar, Sweden
- Uusikaupunki, Finland
- Valga, Estonia
- Valka, Latvia
- Weißenburg in Bayern, Germany

== Notable people ==
- Darina Laščiaková (1931–2026) – Slovak folk singer
