= Liesek =

- Municipality
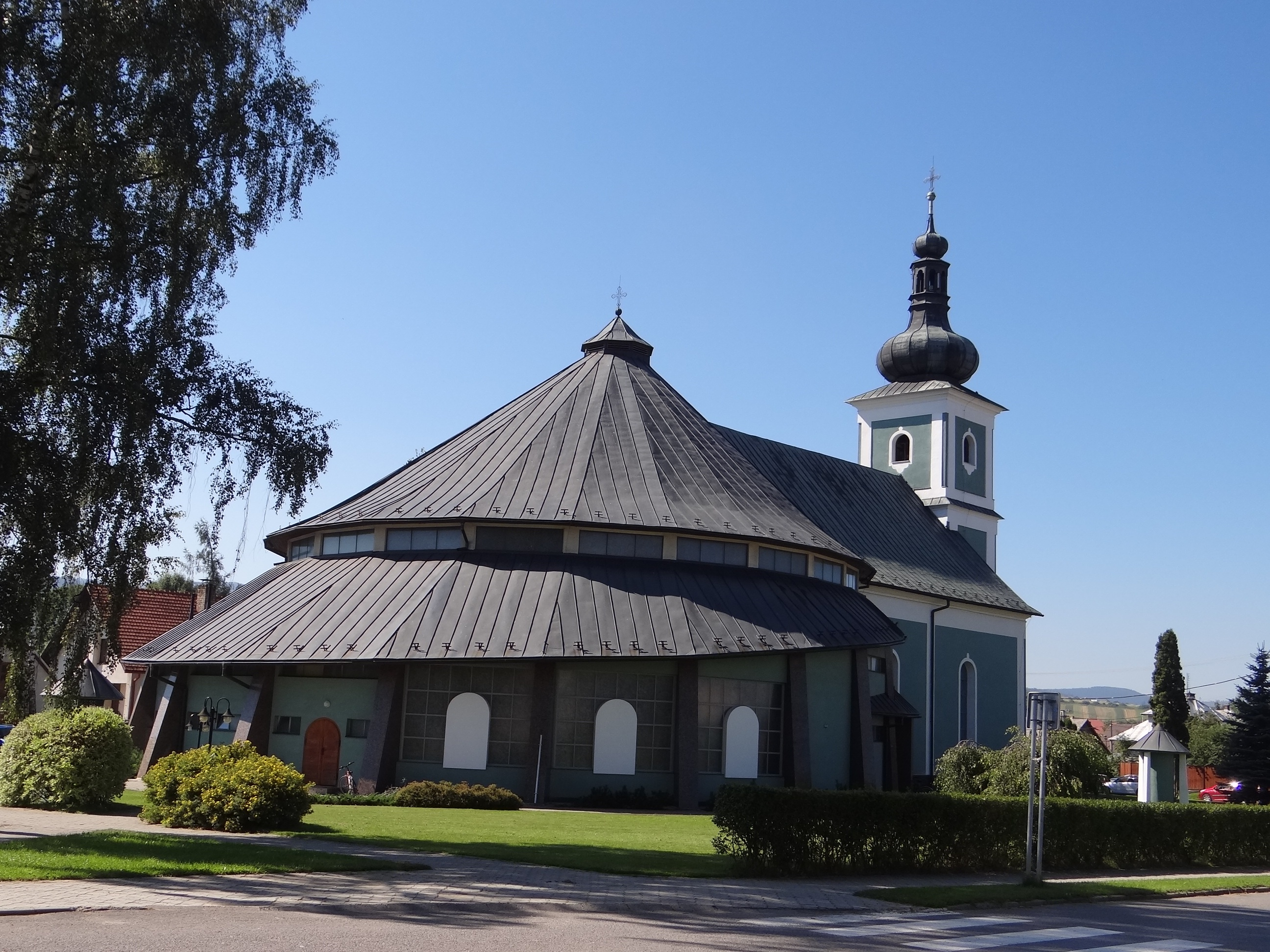
- Church in Liesek

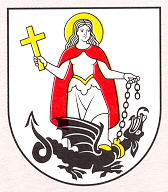
- Flag Coat of arms

- Location of Liesek in the Žilina Region Location of Liesek in Slovakia
- Coordinates: 49.37°N 19.68°E
- Country: Slovakia
- Region: Žilina Region
- District: Tvrdošín District
- First mentioned: 1558

Area
  - Total: 30.90 km^{2} (11.93 sq mi)
- Elevation: 651 m (2,136 ft)

Population (2025)
  - Total: 3,133
- Time zone: UTC+1 (CET)
  - Summer (DST): UTC+2 (CEST)
- Postal code: 271 2
- Area code: +421 43
- Vehicle registration plate (until 2022): TS
- Website: www.obecliesek.sk

Liesek (Hungarian: Ljeszek) is a village and municipality in Tvrdošín District in the Žilina Region of northern Slovakia.

== History ==
In historical records the village was first mentioned in 1558.

== Geography ==
The municipality lies at an altitude of 651 metres (2,136 ft) and covers an area of 30.90 km^{2} (11.93 sq mi) (2025).

=== Climate ===
According to Köppen climate classification, Liesek has a humid continental climate with warm summers, classified as Dfb.

Climate data for Liesek (1991−2020)
| Month | Jan | Feb | Mar | Apr | May | Jun | Jul | Aug | Sep | Oct | Nov | Dec | Year |
|---|---|---|---|---|---|---|---|---|---|---|---|---|---|
| Record high °C (°F) | 11.6 (52.9) | 14.3 (57.7) | 19.7 (67.5) | 26.6 (79.9) | 29.1 (84.4) | 31.7 (89.1) | 33.2 (91.8) | 33.6 (92.5) | 31.0 (87.8) | 25.1 (77.2) | 20.0 (68.0) | 14.8 (58.6) | 33.6 (92.5) |
| Mean daily maximum °C (°F) | 0.0 (32.0) | 1.8 (35.2) | 6.0 (42.8) | 12.6 (54.7) | 17.2 (63.0) | 20.7 (69.3) | 22.4 (72.3) | 22.8 (73.0) | 17.4 (63.3) | 12.2 (54.0) | 6.2 (43.2) | 0.9 (33.6) | 11.7 (53.1) |
| Daily mean °C (°F) | −3.6 (25.5) | −2.5 (27.5) | 0.8 (33.4) | 6.3 (43.3) | 11.1 (52.0) | 14.8 (58.6) | 16.2 (61.2) | 15.9 (60.6) | 11.2 (52.2) | 6.9 (44.4) | 2.3 (36.1) | −2.3 (27.9) | 6.4 (43.5) |
| Mean daily minimum °C (°F) | −7.1 (19.2) | −6.6 (20.1) | −3.3 (26.1) | 0.9 (33.6) | 5.5 (41.9) | 9.2 (48.6) | 10.7 (51.3) | 10.3 (50.5) | 6.6 (43.9) | 2.8 (37.0) | −1.1 (30.0) | −5.6 (21.9) | 1.9 (35.4) |
| Record low °C (°F) | −30.2 (−22.4) | −30.6 (−23.1) | −24.3 (−11.7) | −12.7 (9.1) | −6.3 (20.7) | 0.9 (33.6) | 2.3 (36.1) | 1.5 (34.7) | −3.3 (26.1) | −11.0 (12.2) | −17.0 (1.4) | −27.9 (−18.2) | −30.6 (−23.1) |
| Average precipitation mm (inches) | 32.9 (1.30) | 36.0 (1.42) | 42.9 (1.69) | 52.3 (2.06) | 98.7 (3.89) | 113.1 (4.45) | 131.1 (5.16) | 93.2 (3.67) | 86.0 (3.39) | 64.0 (2.52) | 46.7 (1.84) | 32.6 (1.28) | 829.5 (32.66) |
| Average precipitation days (≥ 1.0 mm) | 8.1 | 8.7 | 9.4 | 9.3 | 12.2 | 12.4 | 12.3 | 9.2 | 10.0 | 9.5 | 8.9 | 7.7 | 117.8 |
| Average snowy days | 17.6 | 15.8 | 14.0 | 6.1 | 1.0 | 0.0 | 0.0 | 0.0 | 0.1 | 3.3 | 8.6 | 14.6 | 81.1 |
| Average relative humidity (%) | 84.5 | 81.4 | 78.5 | 73.1 | 75.0 | 75.9 | 75.9 | 77.4 | 81.3 | 82.6 | 83.6 | 85.9 | 79.6 |
| Mean monthly sunshine hours | 75.2 | 87.3 | 133.2 | 178.3 | 204.6 | 208.6 | 230.0 | 226.0 | 155.9 | 125.5 | 79.2 | 65.1 | 1,768.9 |
Source: NOAA

== Population ==
Population statistic (10 years)
| Year | 1995 | 2005 | 2015 | 2025 |
|---|---|---|---|---|
| Count | 2310 | 2630 | 2866 | 3133 |
| Difference | | +13.85% | +8.97% | +9.31% |

Population statistic
| Year | 2024 | 2025 |
|---|---|---|
| Count | 3118 | 3133 |
| Difference | | +0.48% |

It has a population of 3133 people (31 December 2025).

=== Ethnicity ===
Census 2021 (1+ %)
| Ethnicity | Number | Fraction |
|---|---|---|
| Slovak | 2935 | 99.08% |
| Not found out | 32 | 1.08% |
| Total | 2962 | |

In year 2021 was 2962 people by ethnicity 2935 as Slovak, 32 as Not found out, 7 as Czech, 5 as Polish, 4 as Russian, 3 as Other, 2 as Serbian, 1 as Ukrainian, 1 as Romani, 1 as Romanian, 1 as German and 1 as Hungarian.

Note on population: The difference values of population numbers in the table "Population statistic" and in the sections "Ethnicity" & "Religion" is caused by the use of various statistical methods.

=== Religion ===
Census 2021 (1+ %)
| Religion | Number | Fraction |
|---|---|---|
| Roman Catholic Church | 2813 | 94.97% |
| None | 83 | 2.8% |
| Not found out | 32 | 1.08% |
| Total | 2962 | |

In year 2021 was 2962 people by religion 2813 from Roman Catholic Church, 83 from None, 32 from Not found out, 8 from Evangelical Church, 7 from Greek Catholic Church, 5 from Christian Congregations in Slovakia, 3 from Other, 2 from Calvinist Church, 2 from Eastern Orthodox Church, 2 from Other and not ascertained christian church, 2 from Ad hoc movements, 1 from Seventh-day Adventist Church, 1 from Buddhism and 1 from Apostolic Church.

== Church ==
The Baroque church of Saint Michael Archangel, consecrated at 1818, has been extended in 1996–97. The extension initiated by the parish priest Stefan Koma is a unique blend of the Baroque and modern functionalist style.
