= Vitanová =

Village in Slovakia

- Municipality
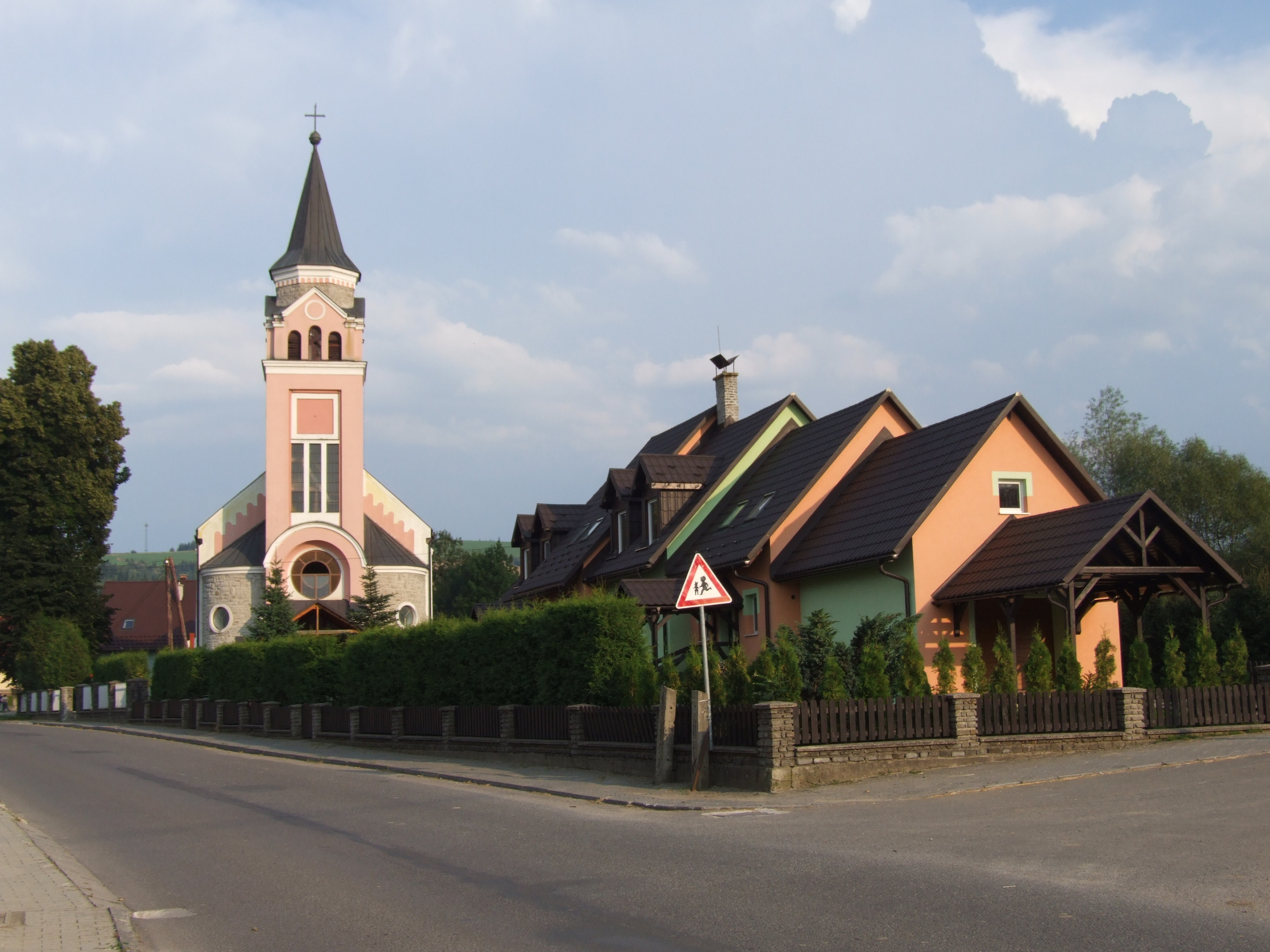

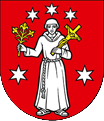
- Flag Coat of arms

- Location of Vitanová in the Žilina Region Location of Vitanová in Slovakia
- Coordinates: 49.35°N 19.73°E
- Country: Slovakia
- Region: Žilina Region
- District: Tvrdošín District
- First mentioned: 1550

Area
  - Total: 45.92 km^{2} (17.73 sq mi)
- Elevation: 699 m (2,293 ft)

Population (2025)
  - Total: 1,325
- Time zone: UTC+1 (CET)
  - Summer (DST): UTC+2 (CEST)
- Postal code: 271 2
- Area code: +421 43
- Vehicle registration plate (until 2022): TS
- Website: www.vitanova.sk

Vitanová (Hungarian: Vitanova) is a village and municipality in Tvrdošín District in the Žilina Region of northern Slovakia.

== History ==
In historical records the village was first mentioned in 1550.

== Geography ==
The municipality lies at an altitude of 699 metres (2,293 ft) and covers an area of 45.92 km^{2} (17.73 sq mi) (2025).

== Population ==
Population statistic (10 years)
Year	1995	2005	2015	2025
Count	1184	1237	1303	1325
Difference		+4.47%	+5.33%	+1.68%

Population statistic
Year	2024	2025
Count	1319	1325
Difference		+0.45%

It has a population of 1325 people (31 December 2025).

=== Ethnicity ===
Census 2021 (1+ %)
Ethnicity	Number	Fraction
Slovak	1309	99.09%
Not found out	14	1.05%
Total	1321	

In year 2021 was 1321 people by ethnicity 1309 as Slovak, 14 as Not found out, 4 as Czech, 1 as Russian and 1 as Polish.

Note on population: The difference values of population numbers in the table "Population statistic" and in the sections "Ethnicity" & "Religion" is caused by the use of various statistical methods.

=== Religion ===
Census 2021 (1+ %)
Religion	Number	Fraction
Roman Catholic Church	1232	93.26%
None	60	4.54%
Total	1321	

In year 2021 was 1321 people by religion 1232 from Roman Catholic Church, 60 from None, 12 from Not found out, 6 from Christian Congregations in Slovakia, 3 from Evangelical Church, 3 from Ad hoc movements, 2 from Other and not ascertained christian church, 1 from Calvinist Church, 1 from Greek Catholic Church and 1 from United Methodist Church.
