= Habovka =

- Municipality
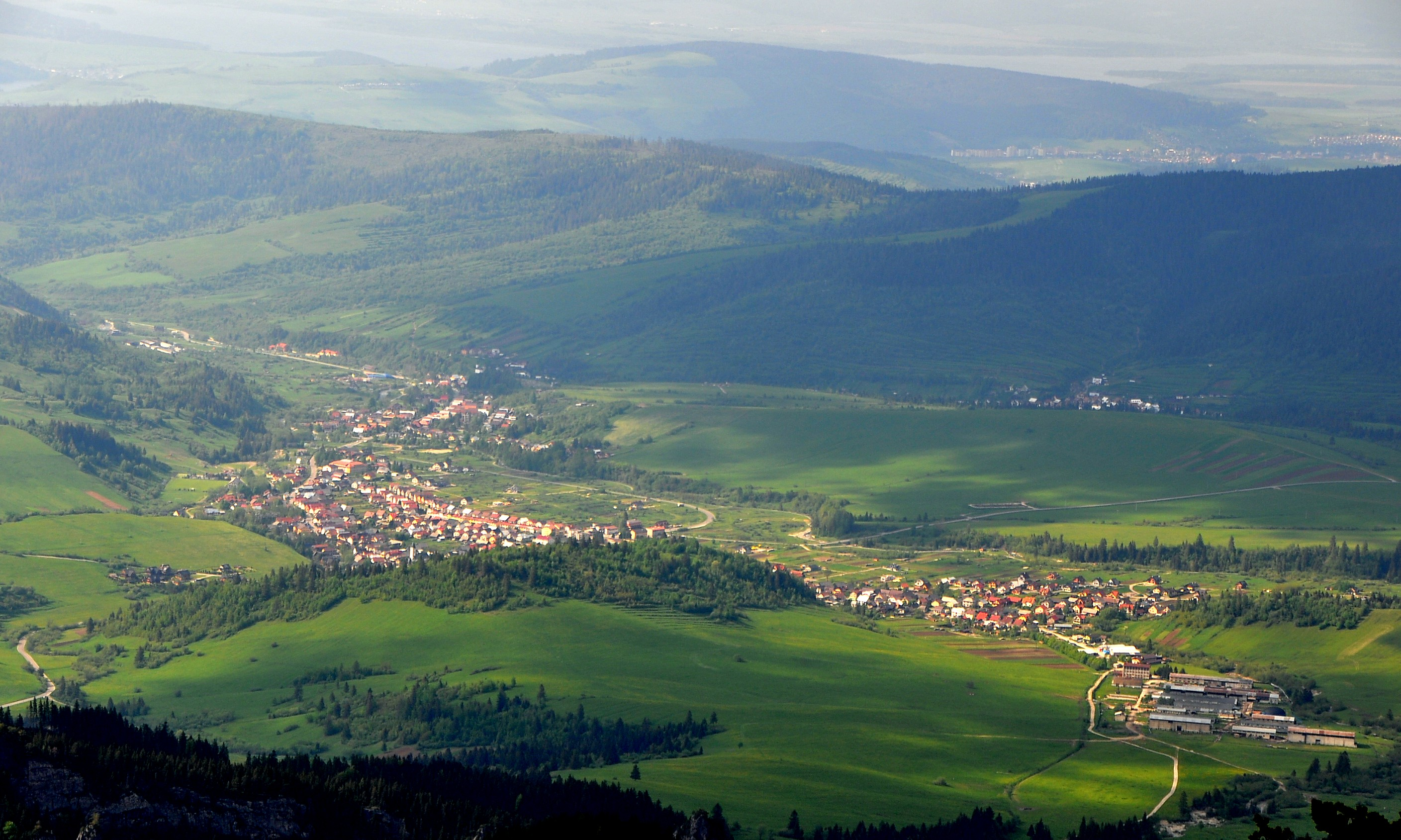

- Flag

- Location of Habovka in the Žilina Region Location of Habovka in Slovakia
- Coordinates: 49.28°N 19.62°E
- Country: Slovakia
- Region: Žilina Region
- District: Tvrdošín District
- First mentioned: 1593

Area
  - Total: 29.15 km^{2} (11.25 sq mi)
- Elevation: 736 m (2,415 ft)

Population (2025)
  - Total: 1,357
- Time zone: UTC+1 (CET)
  - Summer (DST): UTC+2 (CEST)
- Postal code: 273 2
- Area code: +421 43
- Vehicle registration plate (until 2022): TS
- Website: www.habovka.sk

Habovka is a village and municipality in Tvrdošín District in the Žilina Region of northern Slovakia.

== History ==
In historical records the village was first mentioned in 1593. The first settlers came from the Polish village of Chabówka, which lent the settlement its name.

== Geography ==
The municipality lies at an altitude of 736 metres (2,415 ft) and covers an area of 29.15 km^{2} (11.25 sq mi) (2025).

== Population ==
Population statistic (10 years)
Year	1995	2005	2015	2025
Count	1207	1351	1373	1357
Difference		+11.93%	+1.62%	−1.16%

Population statistic
Year	2024	2025
Count	1361	1357
Difference		−0.29%

It has a population of 1357 people (31 December 2025).

=== Ethnicity ===
Census 2021 (1+ %)
Ethnicity	Number	Fraction
Slovak	1360	98.98%
Total	1374	

In year 2021 was 1374 people by ethnicity 1360 as Slovak, 10 as Not found out, 8 as Czech, 5 as Polish, 5 as Other and 2 as Russian.

Note on population: The difference values of population numbers in the table "Population statistic" and in the sections "Ethnicity" & "Religion" is caused by the use of various statistical methods.

=== Religion ===
Census 2021 (1+ %)
Religion	Number	Fraction
Roman Catholic Church	1279	93.09%
None	60	4.37%
Total	1374	

In year 2021 was 1374 people by religion 1279 from Roman Catholic Church, 60 from None, 9 from Jehovah's Witnesses, 8 from Not found out, 4 from Eastern Orthodox Church, 4 from Ad hoc movements, 3 from Paganism and natural spirituality, 3 from Evangelical Church, 2 from Christian Congregations in Slovakia, 1 from Other and not ascertained christian church and 1 from United Methodist Church.

== Genealogical resources ==
The records for genealogical research are available at the state archive "Statny Archiv in Bytca, Slovakia"

- Greek Catholic church records (births/marriages/deaths): 1787-1897 (parish A)

== See also ==
- List of municipalities and towns in Slovakia
