= Czech Republic–Poland relations =

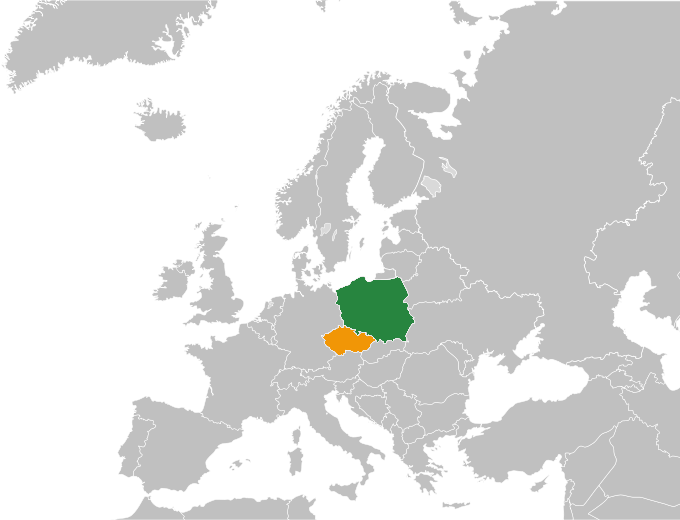
- Poland: Czech Republic

Czech Republic–Poland relations are the bilateral and historical ties between the Republic of Poland and the Czech Republic, they are members of the European Union and of NATO. Both joined the EU simultaneously on 1 May 2004. They also both joined NATO on 12 March 1999. Both countries, together with Slovakia and Hungary, form the Visegrád Group, which is an important regional group in Central Europe. Both countries are also members of the Bucharest Nine, Three Seas Initiative, OECD, OSCE, Council of Europe and the World Trade Organization.

Both nations have a long historical contact since their foundation in the Early Middle Ages. They share 796 km (495 mi) of the Czech Republic–Poland border, which can be crossed anywhere without border control under the Schengen Agreement.

== Country comparison ==
	Czech Republic Czechia (Česká republika)	Poland Republic of Poland (Rzeczpospolita Polska)
Flag & Coat of arms	Czech Republic	Poland
Population	10,900,555	37,314,000
Area	78,871 km^{2} (30,452 sq mi)	312,696 km^{2} (120,733 sq mi)
Population Density	133/km^{2} (344.5/sq mi)	126/km^{2} (326.3/sq mi)
Government	Unitary parliamentary constitutional republic	Unitary parliamentary constitutional republic
Capital	Prague – 1,407,084 (2,267,817 Metro)	Warsaw – 1,862,402 (3,269,510 Metro)
Largest City	Prague – 1,407,084 (2,267,817 Metro)	Warsaw – 1,862,402 (3,269,510 Metro)
Current leader	President Petr Pavel; Prime Minister Andrej Babiš	President Karol Nawrocki; Prime Minister Donald Tusk
Official language	Czech (de facto and de jure)	Polish (de facto and de jure)

== History ==
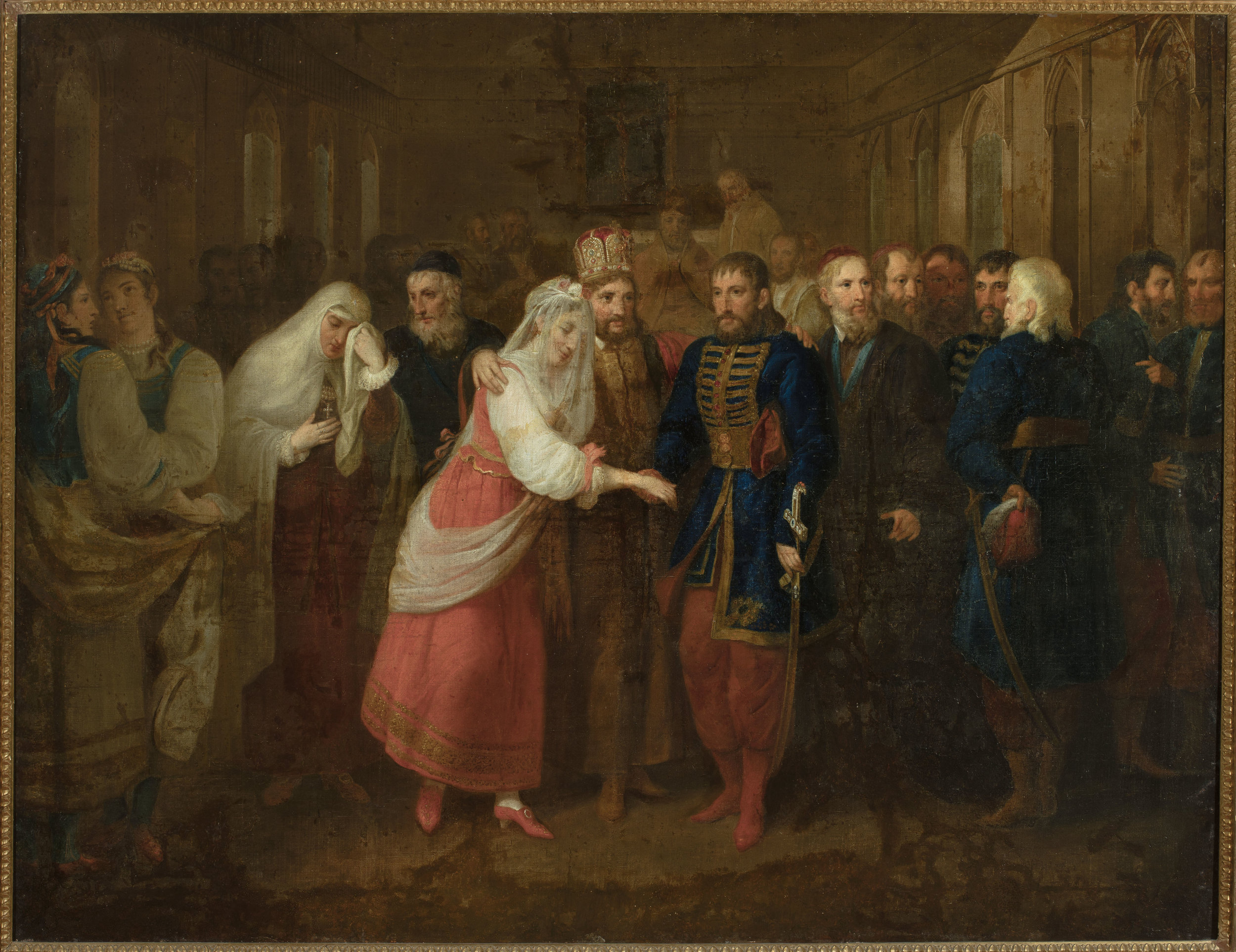
Marriage of Mieszko I of Poland and Doubravka of Bohemia, which cemented the first Polish-Bohemian alliance, on a 19th-century painting by Józef Peszka

Relations date back to the Middle Ages, when both countries were established in the 9th-10th century. In the 10th century, Bohemia (Czechia) was the only neighbor of Poland, that was effectively Christianized and organized according to Western European standards, so Mieszko I of Poland drew his standards from Bohemia. The founding Piast and Přemyslid dynasties, of Poland and Czechia (Bohemia) respectively, intermarried several times. Prime examples include first Polish ruler Mieszko I who married Princess Doubravka of Bohemia, and first Bohemian king Vratislaus II who married Princess Świętosława of Poland. Polish ruler Bolesław the Brave also ruled Bohemia (Czechia) in 1003–1004, whereas King Wenceslaus II of Bohemia also ruled Poland in 1296–1305. The subsequent Bohemian kings then claimed the Polish crown until 1335. In 1471, Polish prince Vladislaus Jagiellon, son of Polish King Casimir IV Jagiellon, became King of Bohemia, and afterwards the two countries were ruled by two closely related branches of the Jagiellonian dynasty until 1526.

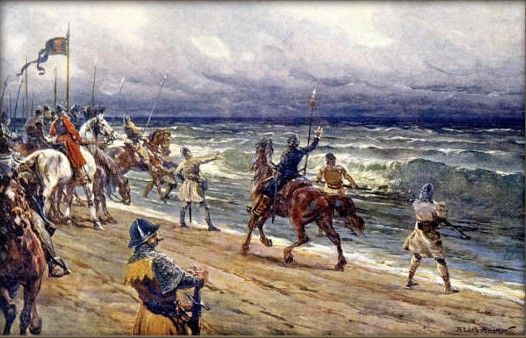
Polish-allied Czech Hussites on the shore of the Baltic Sea during the Polish–Teutonic War of 1431–1435 on a painting by Adolf Liebscher

Several Bohemian–Polish wars were fought for control of the border regions of Moravia, Silesia and Lesser Poland in the Middle Ages. Additionally, Bohemia was allied against Poland during the German–Polish wars of 1003–1018, 1028–1031, 1109 and 1157 and the Polish–Teutonic War of 1326–1332. Czechs and Poles were also allies on multiple occasions, with the first alliance formed around 965. Moravia aided Poland during the first Mongol invasion of Poland in 1241. At the Battle of Kressenbrunn between Bohemia and Hungary in 1260, the Polish duchies of Silesia and Kraków fought on opposite sides. Poland aided Bohemia against Hungarians and Germans at the Battle on the Marchfeld in 1278. In 1363, Poland was allied with Denmark against Bohemia. In 1432, Poland entered an alliance with the Czech Orebites, and then Poles and Czechs together fought many battles in the Polish–Teutonic War of 1431–1435. Some Poles fought on the side of the Czech Taborites in the Battle of Lipany in 1434. In 1457, Czech mercenaries hired by the Teutonic Knights in their Thirteen Years' War of 1454–1466 against Poland sold the strongholds of Malbork, Tczew and Iława to Poland in lieu of indemnities. Bohemia and Poland were part of a coalition of several European countries in the Crusade of Varna of 1443–1444 and the Hungarian–Ottoman War of 1521–1526, which goal was to repel the Ottoman invasion of Europe and liberate the already conquered nations of Southeast Europe. In 1474, Bohemia and Poland were allied against Hungary.

After the Bohemian loss to Austria at the Battle of White Mountain of 1620, many Czechs adhering to the Moravian Church fled subsequent Austrian Catholic persecution to Poland, forming the once sizeable Czech minority in Poland. The main centers of Czechs in Poland included Leszno and, after the Partitions of Poland, Zelów and Kwasiłów. Notable Czech refugee in Poland was philosopher John Amos Comenius. The files and library of the Unity of the Brethren from Leszno, now held at the State Archive and Raczyński Library in Poznań and the Kórnik Library in Kórnik, are listed on the UNESCO Memory of the World Register.

Following Austria's conquests and annexations, both Bohemia and southern Poland belonged to the Austrian Empire (from 1867 Austria-Hungary) until the end of World War I in 1918. Czechoslovakia–Poland relations were established afterwards.

== Modern relations ==
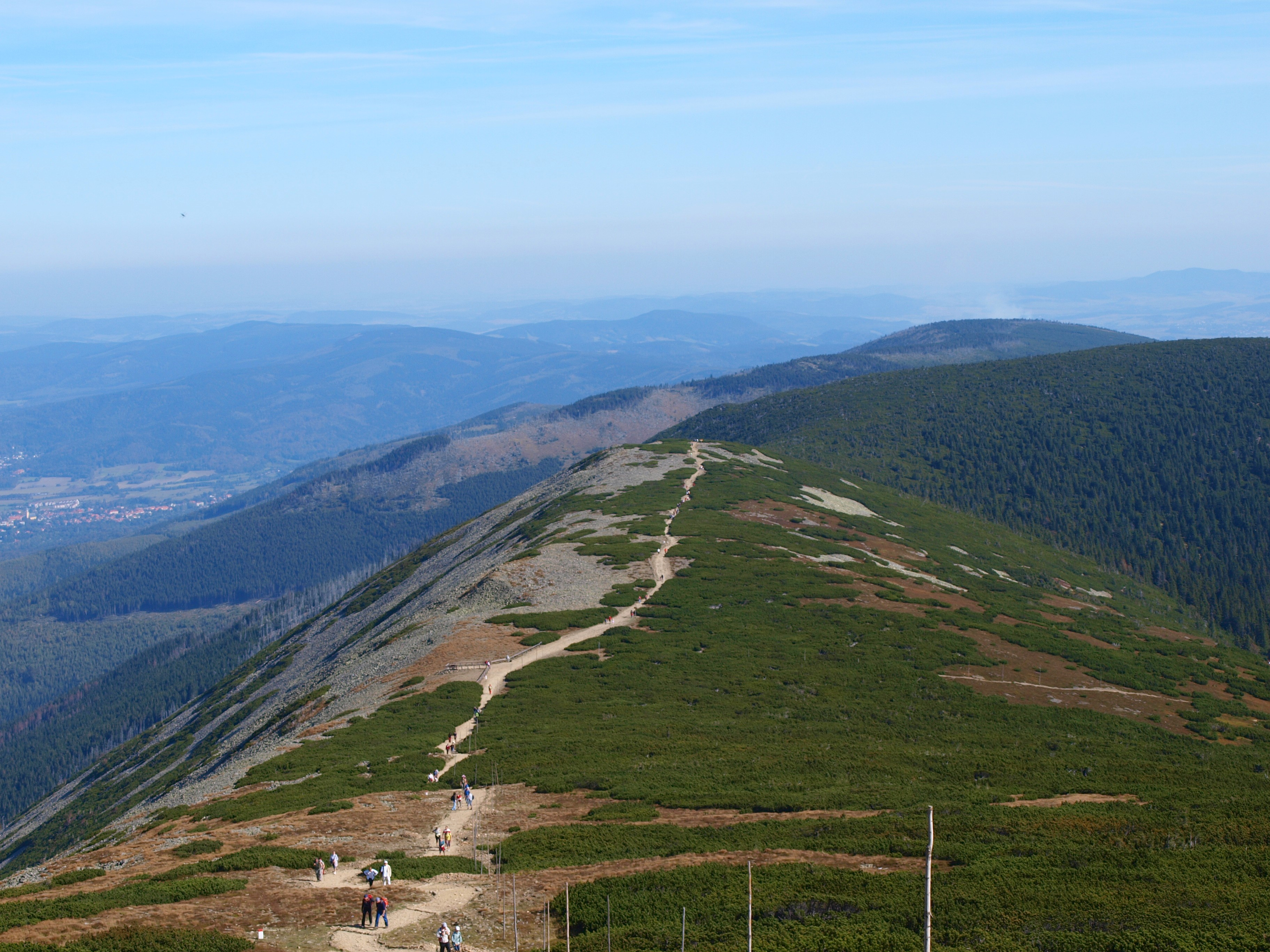
Polish–Czech Friendship Trail on the Czech–Polish border in the Giant Mountains

There is a Polish Institute in Prague. In 2007, the Polish-Czech Scientific Society was founded in Wrocław, among whose statutory goals are research and popularization of knowledge about Polish-Czech relations and organization of Polish-Czech research cooperation.

April 17–18, 2010, were declared days of national mourning in the Czech Republic to commemorate the 96 victims of the Smolensk air disaster, including Polish President Lech Kaczyński and his wife Maria Kaczyńska.

In a 2010 poll conducted by CVVM in the Czech Republic, relations with Poland were ranked as the second best out of 13 countries, after Slovakia, with 92% of respondents viewing them as very good or rather good. In 1993, according to polls, the Czechs were liked by 38% of Poles, with 28% negative opinions. There has been a big improvement since then, and recently the Czechs are among the most-liked nations in Poland, leading in the polls since 2010 (53% of favourable opinions in 2010, 56% in 2019).

Polish firefighters helped in flood recovery in the Czech Republic during the 2002 and 2013 floods.

The Czech Republic and Poland are important trading partners. In 2019, Poland was the third largest source of imports and export destination for the Czech Republic, whereas the Czech Republic was the seventh largest source of imports and the second largest export destination for Poland.

In February 2021, the Czech Republic sued Poland over the Turów Coal Mine at the European Court of Justice, the first time that an EU member state had sued another one over an environmental issue.

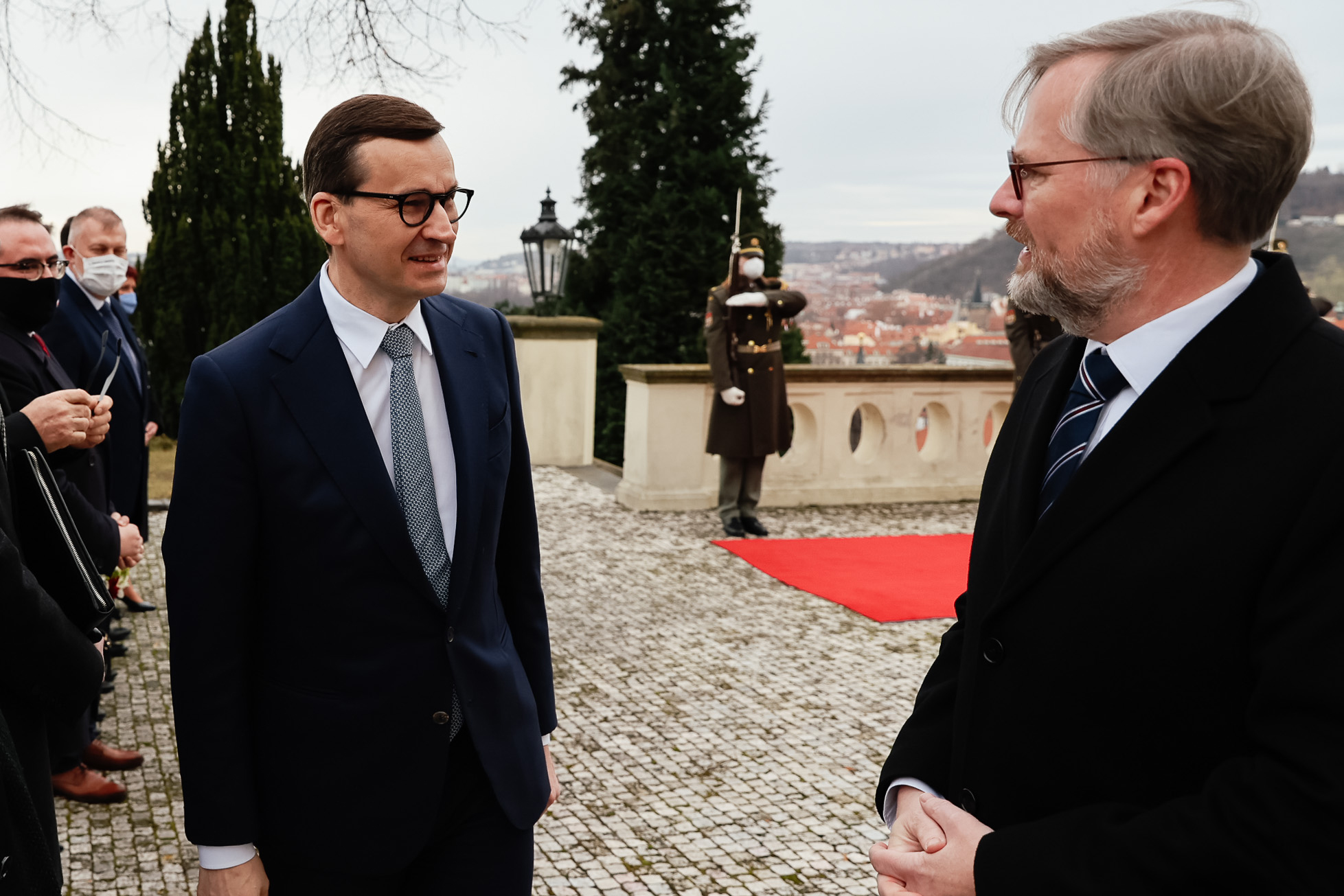
Meeting of Prime Minister of the Czech Republic Petr Fiala and Prime Minister of Poland Mateusz Morawiecki in Prague in 2022

Czechia and Poland co-hosted the 2021 Men's European Volleyball Championship.

Polish firefighters and police pilots helped extinguish the 2022 wildfires in the Czech Republic. The Czechs also helped Poland during the 2024 floods.

Czech students were the 11th largest group of foreign students in Poland in 2021, the 13th largest in 2022 and the 10th largest in 2023 and 2024, at the same time being one of the largest groups from Europe.

== European Union ==
Both countries became members of the European Union in 2004.

== NATO ==
Both countries became members of NATO in 1999.

A Czech helicopter contingent has been stationed in Powidz, Poland, since January 2024 as part of NATO cooperation and reinforcement of NATO's eastern flank. When both countries were affected by the 2024 Central European floods, the Czech contingent took part in relief efforts in southwestern Poland.

== Resident diplomatic missions ==
- Czech Republic has an embassy in Warsaw.
- Poland has an embassy in Prague and a consulate-general in Ostrava.
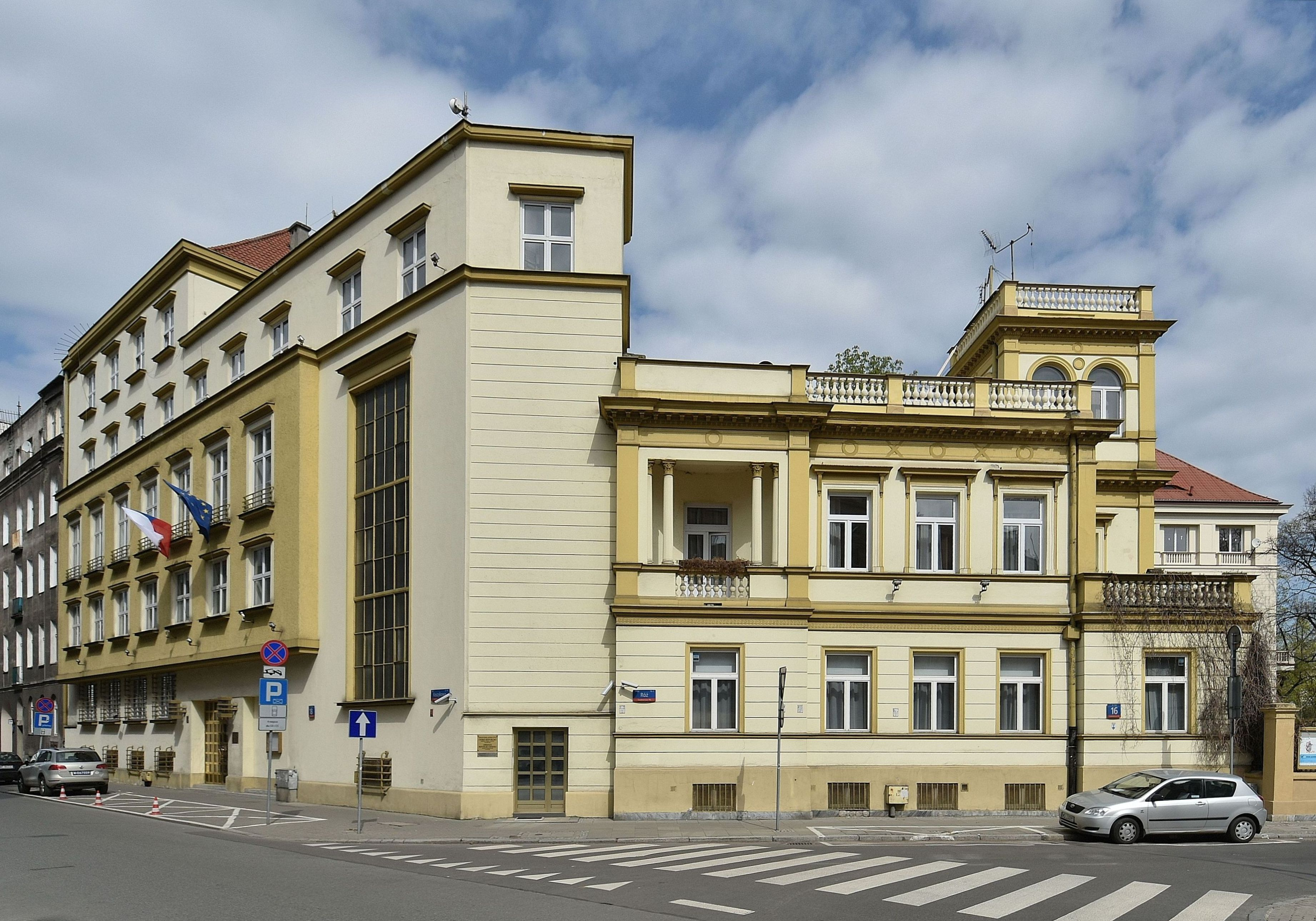
Embassy of the Czech Republic in Warsaw

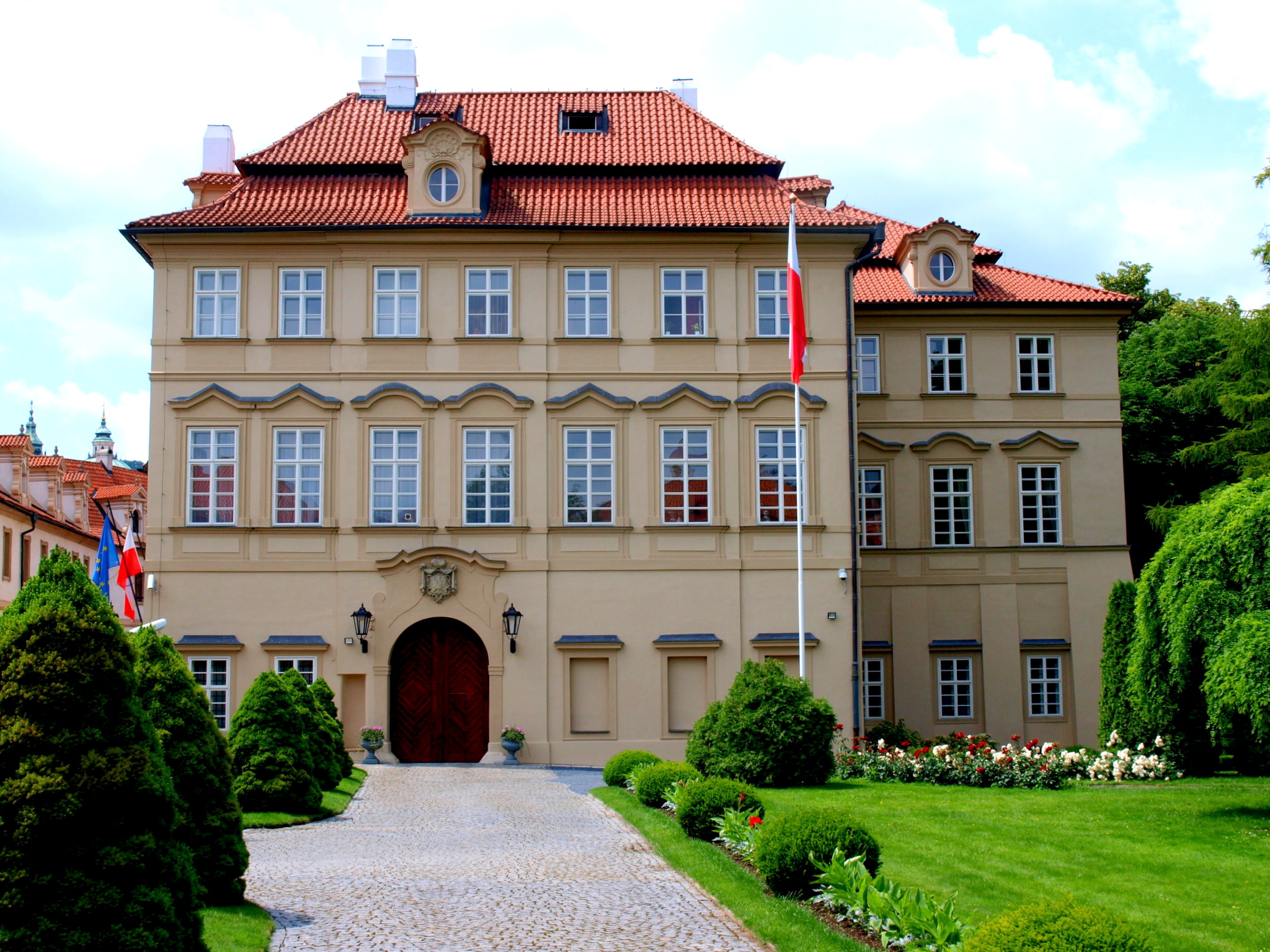
Embassy of Poland in Prague

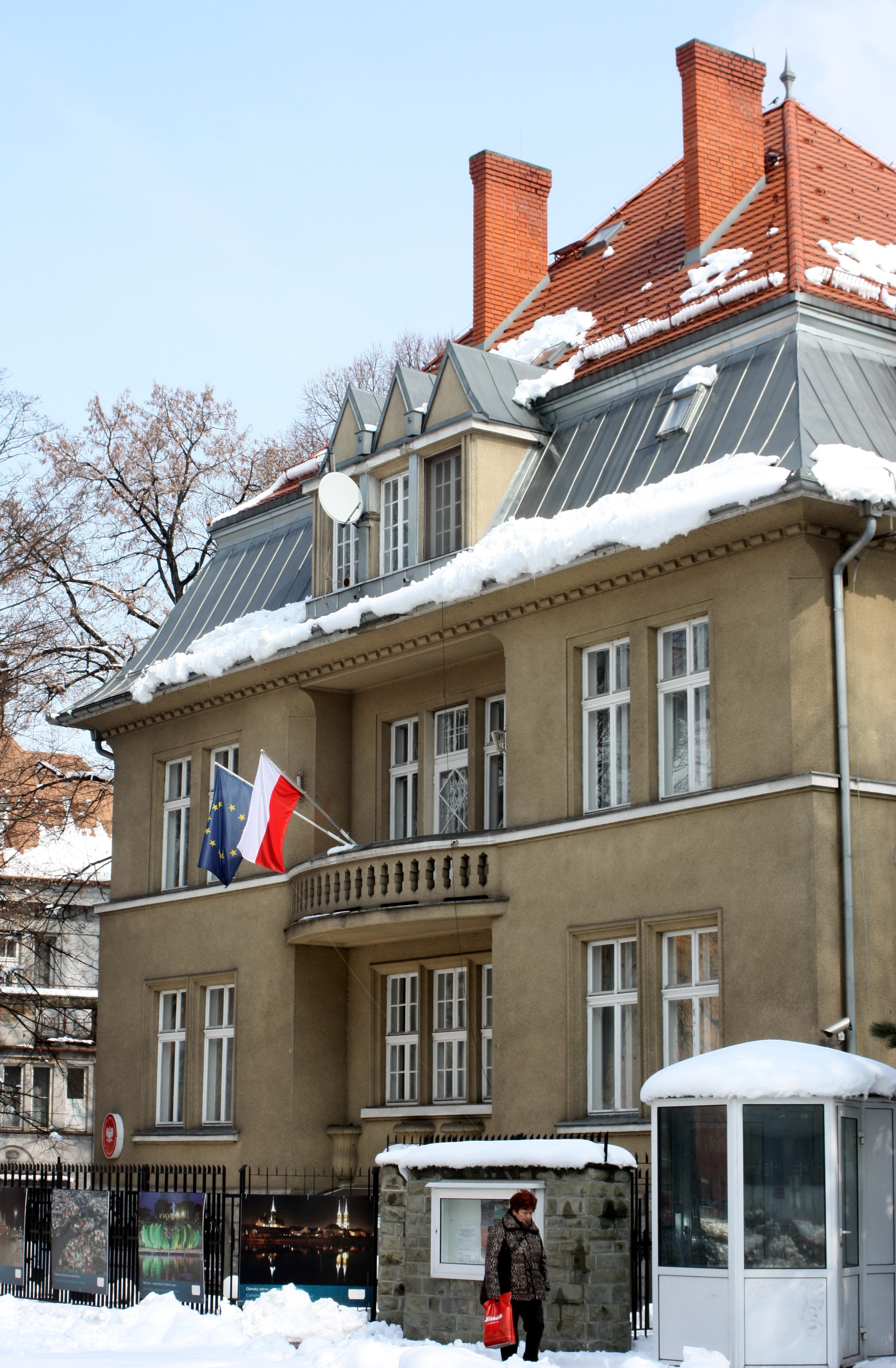
Consulate-General of Poland in Ostrava

== See also ==
- Polish–Czechoslovak border conflicts
- Polish-Czech Forum
- Polish–Czech Friendship Trail
- Polish minority in the Czech Republic
- Czechoslovakia–Poland relations
- 2004 enlargement of the European Union
- Czechs in Poland
