= Balkan Union =

Balkan Union may refer to:

- Balkan Federation
- Greek–Yugoslav confederation
