= Polish Confederation =

Polish Confederation may refer to:

- Confederation (Poland–Lithuania), an informal association in the Polish–Lithuanian Commonwealth;
- Confederation of the Polish Crown, a monarchist party in Poland;
- Confederation Liberty and Independence, a Polish political party that initially formed as an alliance of right-wing political parties;
- Confederation of Independent Poland, a Polish nationalist political party that functioned between 1979 and 2003;
- Polish Confederation – Dignity and Work, a Polish political party that functioned between 2005 and 2007;
- Polish–Czechoslovak confederation, a World War II political concept of a political union between Poland and Czechoslovakia;
- General Confederation of the Kingdom of Poland, a governing body of the Duchy of Warsaw;
- Warsaw Confederation, a Polish resolution from 1573 that granted religious freedoms in Poland;
- Dzików Confederation, a Polish nationalist organisation from 1734 from the War of the Polish Succession;
- Warsaw Confederation (1704), a Polish association formed against the king Augustus II the Strong;
- Sandomierz Confederation, a Polish anti-Swedish association formed in 1704;
- Targowica Confederation, a Polish organisation of pro-Russian nobles formed in 1792;
- Bar Confederation, a Polish anti-Russian organisation formed in 1768;
- Radom Confederation, a Polish association of nobles formed in 1767 against reforms.
