= Polish–Bohemian War (990) =

10th-century war fought in Central Europe

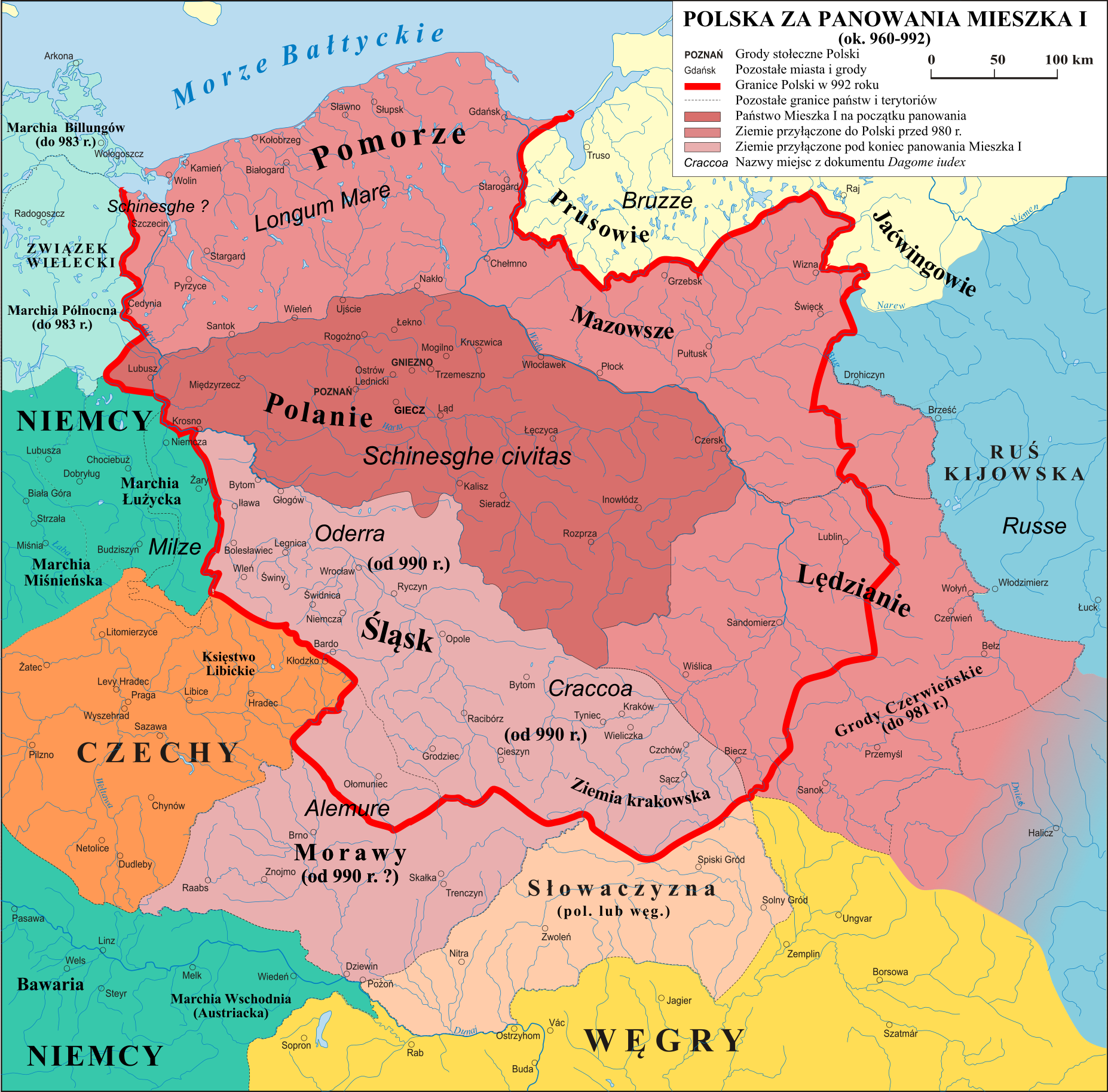
- Poland during the reign of Mieszko I (c. 960–992
Date	990
Location	Silesia
Result	Polish-German victory

Belligerents
Poland; Holy Roman Empire	Duchy of Bohemia; Veleti

Commanders and leaders
Mieszko I of Poland	Boleslaus II, Duke of Bohemia

The Polish–Bohemian War or Polish–Czech War (Polish: Wojna polsko-czeska) was a conflict in Europe in 990 between the Polish duke Mieszko I of the Duchy of Poland and the Bohemian duke Boleslaus II of the Duchy of Bohemia. It ended with the Bohemians' defeat and with Poland conquering the territory of Silesia.

== Prelude ==
Bohemian–Polish relations had worsened following the death of the wife of Mieszko and Bohemian princess Dobrawa in 977; this marked the end of the Polish-Bohemian alliance. Until the mid-980s the rulers of both the Polish and Bohemian states supported the Holy Roman Empire's Henry II, Duke of Bavaria, but their alliance did not last into the second half of that decade.

== The war ==
The war was fought likely for the purposes of territorial expansion, with Polish ruler duke Mieszko I taking over the lands of the Vistulan tribe (Lesser Poland area, with the major settlements of Sandomierz and Kraków) in the years 998–999. The Bohemian duke Boleslaus II contested Mieszko's actions, and their armies clashed in Silesia. The Bohemians received aid from the Veleti, while the Holy Roman Empire helped the Poles and after a short conflict the Bohemians were defeated, with Mieszko also acquiring Silesia for Poland (with territories around Krosno and Niemcza).

There are relatively few accurate historical accounts from this period, and much of the account of the war is based on the chronicles of Thietmar of Merseburg and archaeological discoveries. Thietmar, however, while devoting some space to the conflict itself, did not discuss the reasons for it, which modern historians can only speculate about. There is also evidence that Mieszko might have controlled parts of Silesia as early as mid-980s, and it has been speculated that the reason for the war might have not been over Lesser Poland, but about the territorial disputes in Silesia itself.

== Aftermath ==
This conflict is the first recorded Polish–Bohemian War; several others would follow in decades and centuries to come.
