= Czechoslovakia–Poland relations =

Czechoslovak–Polish relations
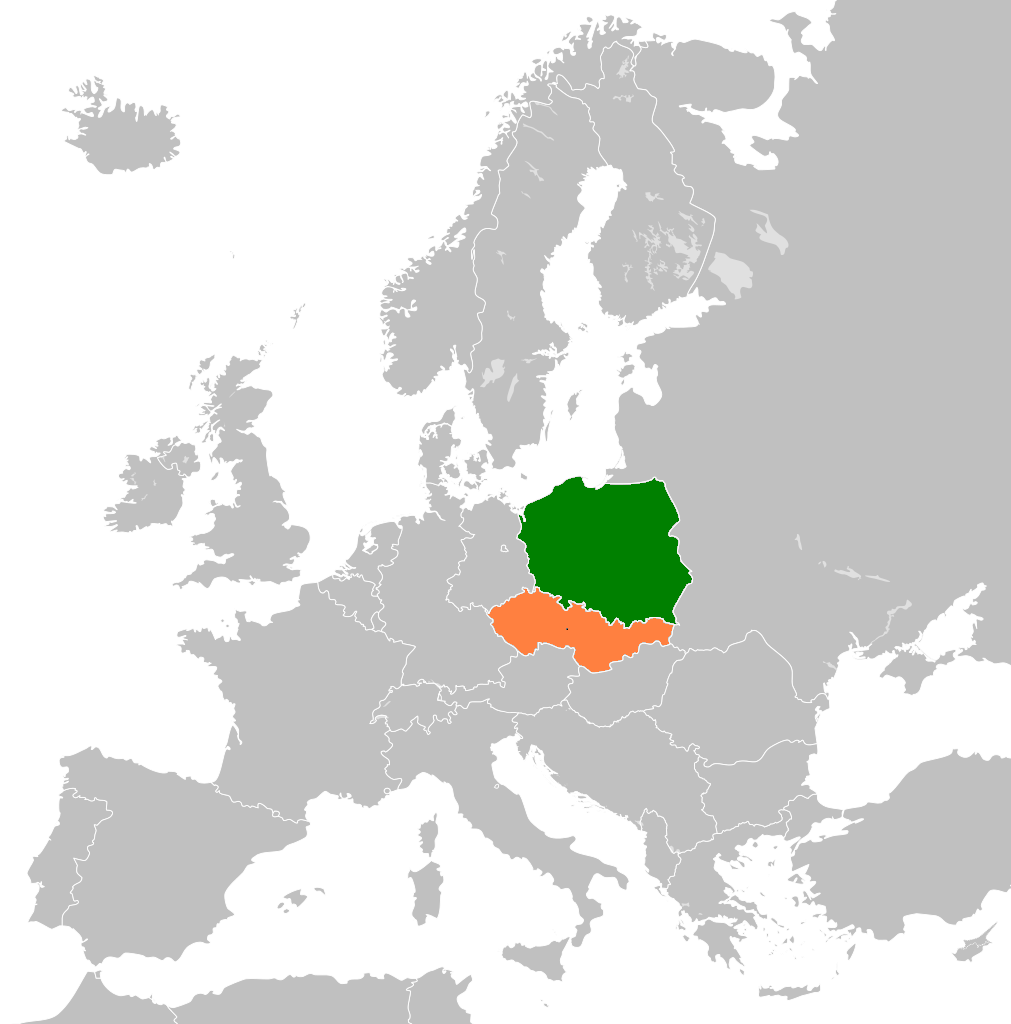
- Poland: Czechoslovakia

The Republic of Poland and Czechoslovakia established relations early in the interwar period, after both countries gained independence. Those relations were somewhat strained by the Polish–Czechoslovak border conflicts over Trans-Olza and Cieszyn in the early 1920s and late 1930s (see also Munich Agreement). Both countries joined the Allies during World War II. After the war they both fell into the Soviet sphere of influence (the Eastern Bloc). Poland, together with other Eastern Bloc countries, participated in the Warsaw Pact invasion of Czechoslovakia in 1968. Relations between the two countries were nonetheless rather amicable, but became somewhat strained in the aftermath of the rise of the Solidarity movement in Poland in 1980 and 1981, improving again afterwards.

== History ==
=== Interwar ===
Czechoslovakia gained independence in the aftermath of World War I, as Austria-Hungary fell apart, just as Poland regained independence as the Second Polish Republic after 123 years of partitions. Both emerging countries shared a long border, and soon became enveloped in a border conflict. Although it never developed into an open war, this conflict led to uneasy relations between both states in the interwar period.

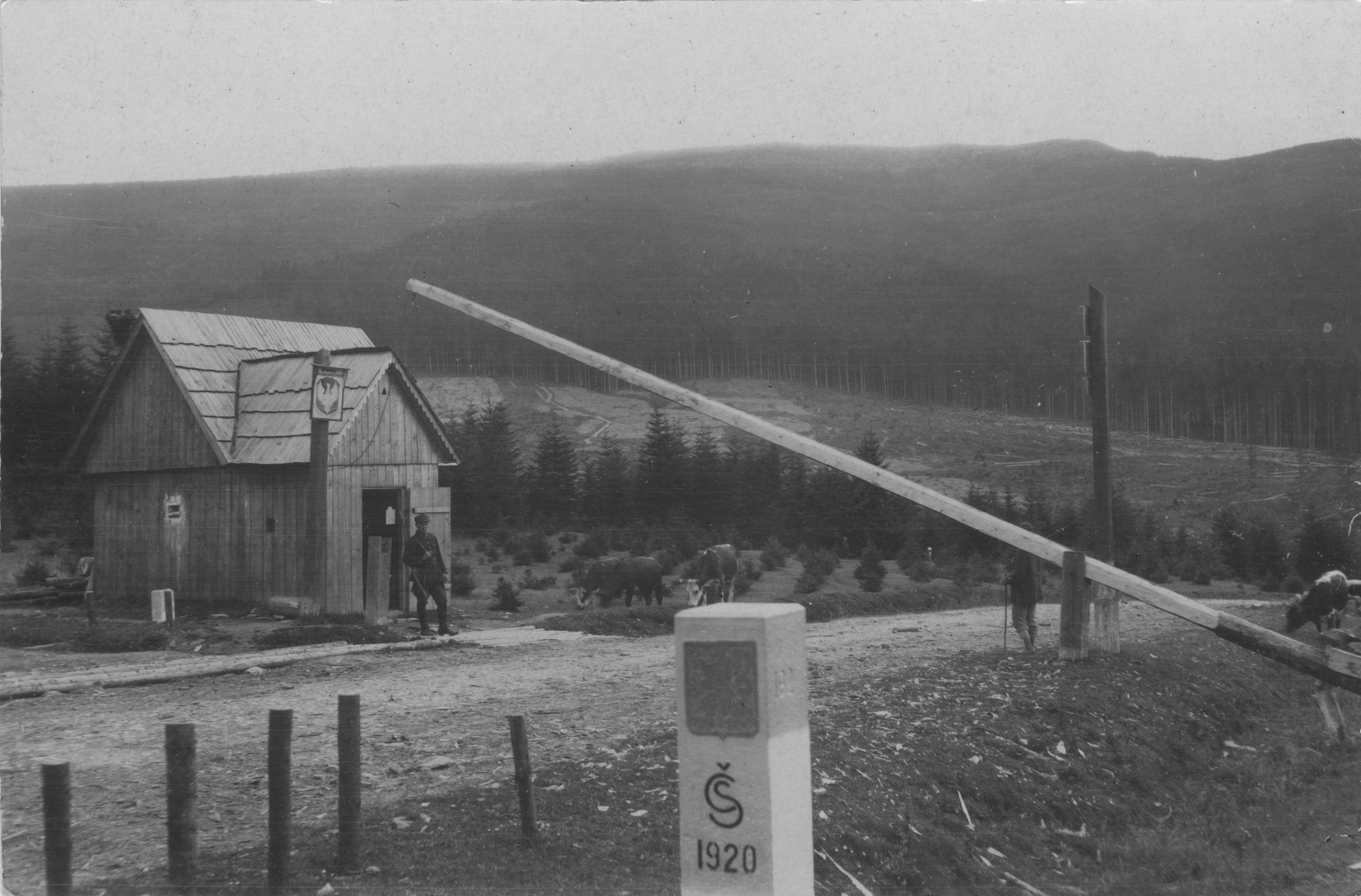
Border crossing between Korbielów, Poland and Oravská Polhora, Czechoslovakia in 1925

The border conflicts were centered on the disputed areas of Cieszyn Silesia, Orava Territory and Spiš. After World War II they broadened to include areas around the cities of Kłodzko and Racibórz, which between 1742 and 1945 had belonged to Prussia and Germany, and earlier at various times were under Polish or Bohemian rule. The conflict, which flared up in 1919, was only resolved by the Council of the League of Nations on 12 March 1924, which decided that Czechoslovakia should retain the territory of Javorina and Ždiar and which entailed (in the same year) an additional exchange of territories in Orava – the territory around Lipnica Mała went to Poland, while the territory around Suchá Hora and Hladovka went to Czechoslovakia. The new frontiers were confirmed by a Czechoslovak-Polish Treaty on 24 April 1925 and are identical with present-day borders.

France was an ally of both Poland and Czechoslovakia, and tried repeatedly to get them to resolve their border disputes and become allies, and also collaborate with the Soviet Union. There was no success, not just because of the border issues but also because Prague's willingness to work with Moscow clashed with the firm resolve of Warsaw to keep its distance from Moscow. Czechoslovak President Edvard Beneš warned that military or even strong political ties with Poland could prove dangerous for Czechoslovakia. In 1938 Poland pursued its own territorial claims, and gave an ultimatum to the Czechoslovak government, which resulted in the annexation of the Trans-Olza region which in fact had a Polish majority.

=== World War II ===
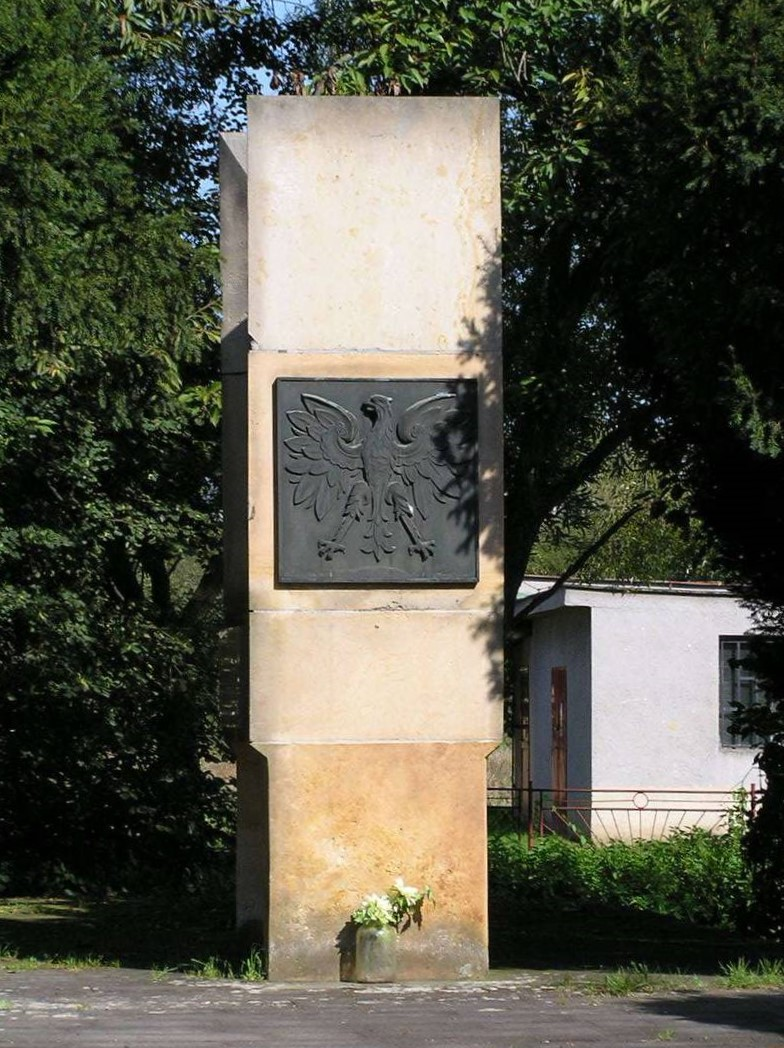
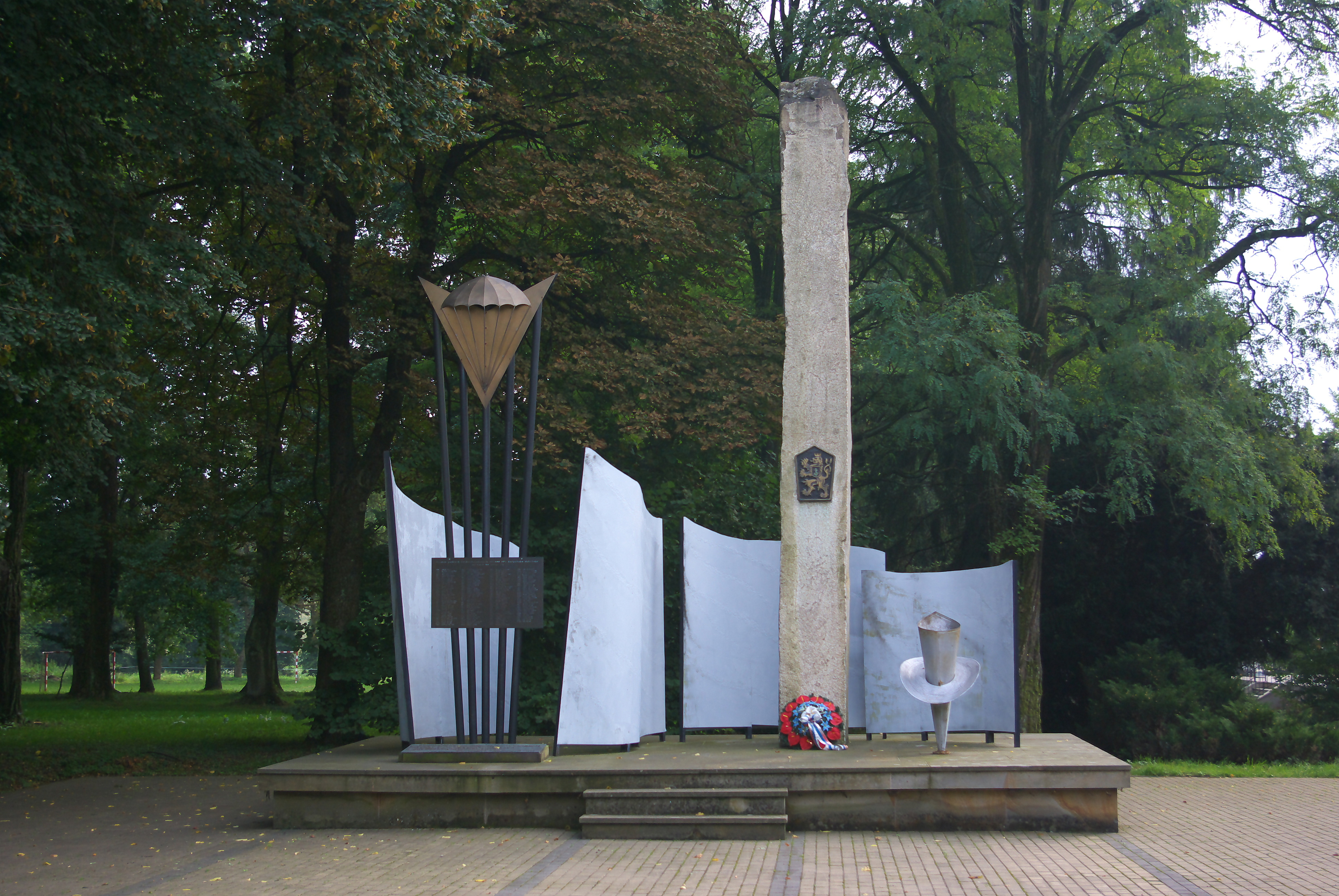
World War II monuments to Polish troops in Úštěk and to Czechoslovak troops in Nowosielce

Both Poland and the Czech part of Czechoslovakia were occupied by Germany during World War II, and both Poland and Czechoslovakia were part of the Allies of World War II. There were even talks of a confederation between the two countries; those plans were however opposed by the Soviet Union, which eventually gained other Allies' support in derailing the Czech-Polish talks.

Poles were among the primary prisoners of German-operated subcamps of the Flossenbürg, Gross-Rosen and Auschwitz concentration camps in occupied Czechoslovakia.

Poles and Czechoslovaks assisted each other in the liberation of their countries from German occupation. Polish soldiers and partisans took part in the Prague offensive and the liberation of the Holýšov concentration camp, whereas Czechoslovak troops took part in the recapture of southern Poland in the Moravia–Ostrava offensive.

=== Post-war ===
After World War II, both countries fell into the Soviet sphere of influence (the Eastern Bloc). A brief series of border conflicts erupted again, as Polish and Czechoslovak politicians and army commanders argued both over the past borders, and over the newly acquired, formerly German territories, but pressure from the Soviet Union put an end to any serious conflict. Under Soviet pressure, in March 1947 Poland and Czechoslovakia signed a treaty of friendship and mutual assistance. On June 13, 1958, a border treaty between the People's Republic of Poland and the Czechoslovak Republic finally resolved the border issue, ending the border dispute.

Czechoslovak Poles (numbering approximately 71,000 in 1984) were concentrated in the Ostrava mining region. Besides resident Poles, many more commuted across the border from the People's Republic of Poland to work in Czechoslovakia or to take advantage of the relative abundance of consumer goods in the neighbouring Czechoslovakia. The Czechoslovak officials tried to limit the influence of Poles, resident or not, considering the influence of Poles (given that Polish communist regime was considered more liberal) in the workplace a threat to the regime. For example, in the 1950s, Poles had initiated the resistance to increased work demands in Czechoslovakia. Similarly, amidst the social and political crisis in the Poland of the 1980s, there were also reports of strikes among the workers of Ostrava.

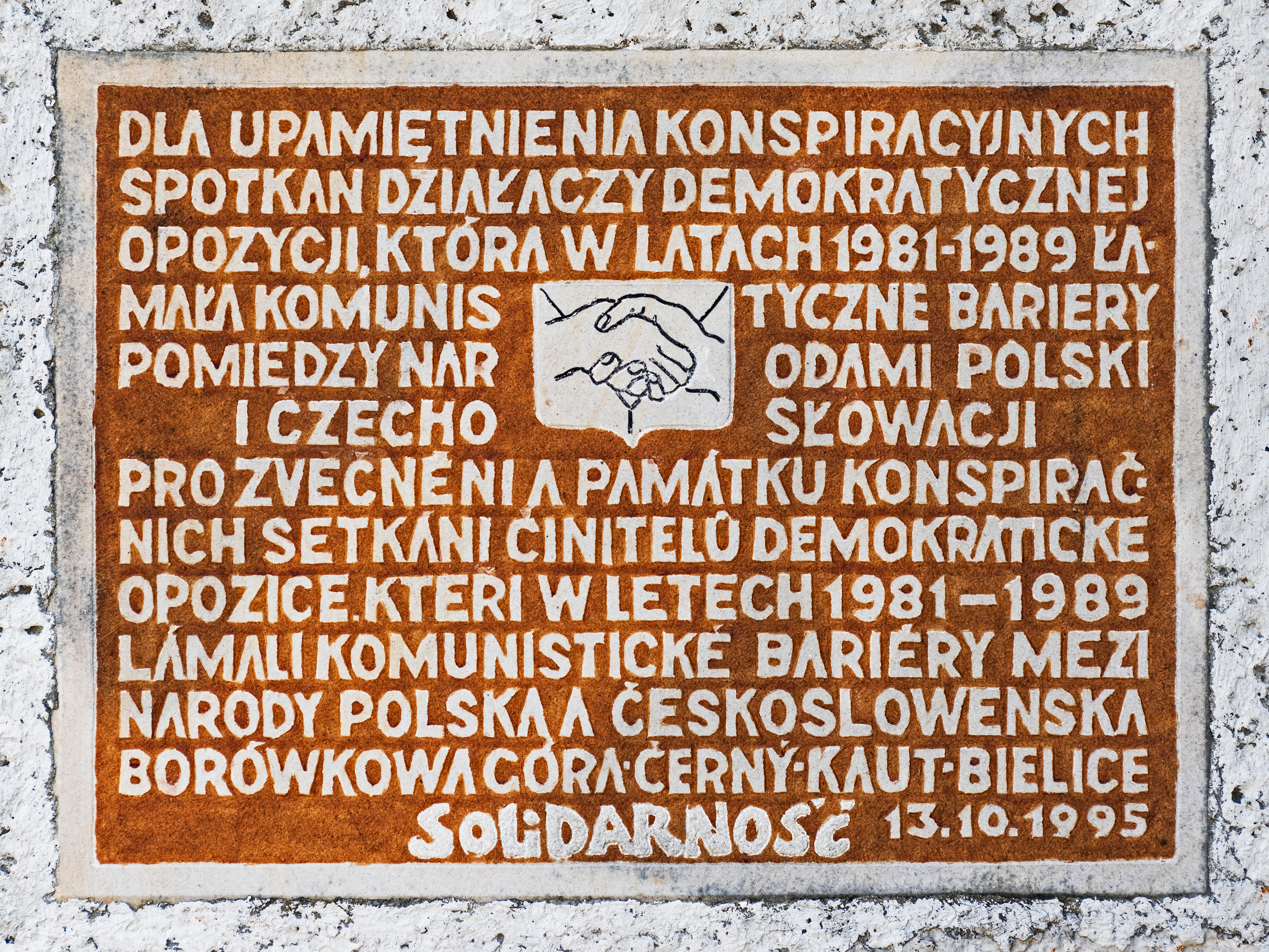
Plaque commemorating the cooperation of Polish and Czechoslovak anti-communists in Bielice, Poland

Poland, together with other Eastern Bloc countries, participated in the Warsaw Pact invasion of Czechoslovakia in 1968. Gomulka, together with Walter Ulbricht, fearful of the possible influence of the Czechoslovak liberalization movement in their own countries, had been some of the most ardent supporters of actions against Czechoslovakia. While the Polish United Workers' Party officially supported the intervention, Polish society unofficially sympathized with the rebellious Czechs. A Polish accountant, Ryszard Siwiec, committed suicide by self-immolation in protest of the invasion. From that time, members of the Polish and Czechoslovak opposition increasingly were in touch with each other (see Komitet Obrony Robotników and Charter 77). Relations between the two countries were amicable, but officially became somewhat strained in the aftermath of the rise of the opposition Solidarity movement in Poland in 1980 and 1981, improving again afterwards, as martial law in Poland temporarily weakened Solidarity. Solidarity members were also active in cooperation with Czechoslovak opposition members, and the eventual opposition victory in Poland sparked off a similar victory of the Czechoslovak opposition.

After 1989 and the fall of communist governments in both countries (see Autumn of Nations), both countries reconfirmed their intention to have good relations under their new, democratic governments. Both set their targets at joining NATO and the European Union. Together with Hungary, they founded the Visegrád Group in 1991, and supported the creation of the Central European Free Trade Agreement in 1992. In December 1992 the respective Presidents of both countries shared a long and heartfelt kiss.

After 1993 Czechoslovakia was split into the Czech Republic and Slovakia, and Poland-Czechoslovakia relations were replaced by Poland–Czech Republic relations and Poland–Slovakia relations.

In 1993, according to polls, Czech and Slovaks were liked by 38% and 33% Poles respectively, with 28% and 27% of negative opinions (it improved much with time and in the 21st century both nations are regularly in top most liked nations by the Poles, with 58% and 57% of favourable opinions in 2012 respectively).

== See also ==
- Czech Republic–Poland relations
- Poland–Slovakia relations
- History of Poland (1918–1939)
