= Poland–Slovakia relations =

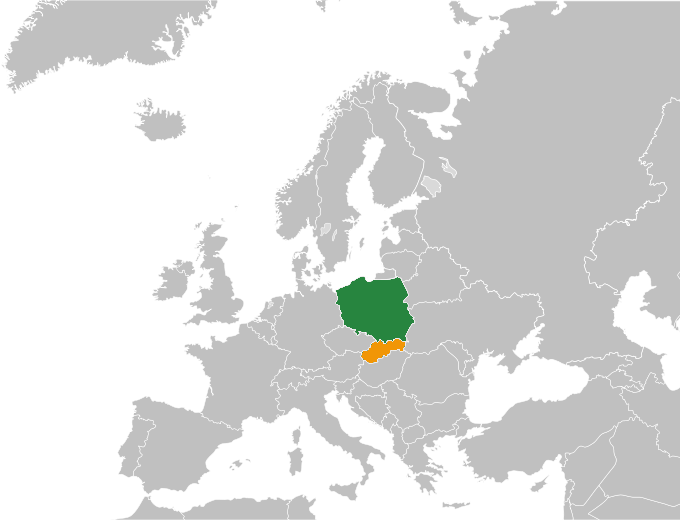
- Poland: Slovakia

Poland–Slovakia relations are foreign relations between Poland and Slovakia. Both nations are members of the EU and NATO. Both joined the EU simultaneously on 1 May 2004. Both countries form together with the Czech Republic and Hungary the V4, which is an important regional group in Central Europe. Both have West Slavic languages as majority languages.

The countries share a 539 km long common border.

== History ==
The bulk of modern Slovakia was part of Poland from 1003 to c. 1031. The northern outskirts of modern Slovakia remained part of Poland before gradually passing to Hungary in the following centuries, however, in 1412 Poland regained portions of the region of Spisz with 16 towns by the Treaty of Lubowla, and retained the territory until Austrian occupation in 1769, and the First Partition of Poland in 1772. From 1918 to 1992 Poland's relations with Slovakia was conducted throughout the relations between Poland and Czechoslovakia, except for the period of 1939–1945.

Both countries became members of the European Union in 2004. Poland joined NATO in 1999. Slovakia joined NATO in 2004.

== Resident diplomatic missions ==
- Poland has an embassy in Bratislava.
- Slovakia has an embassy in Warsaw.
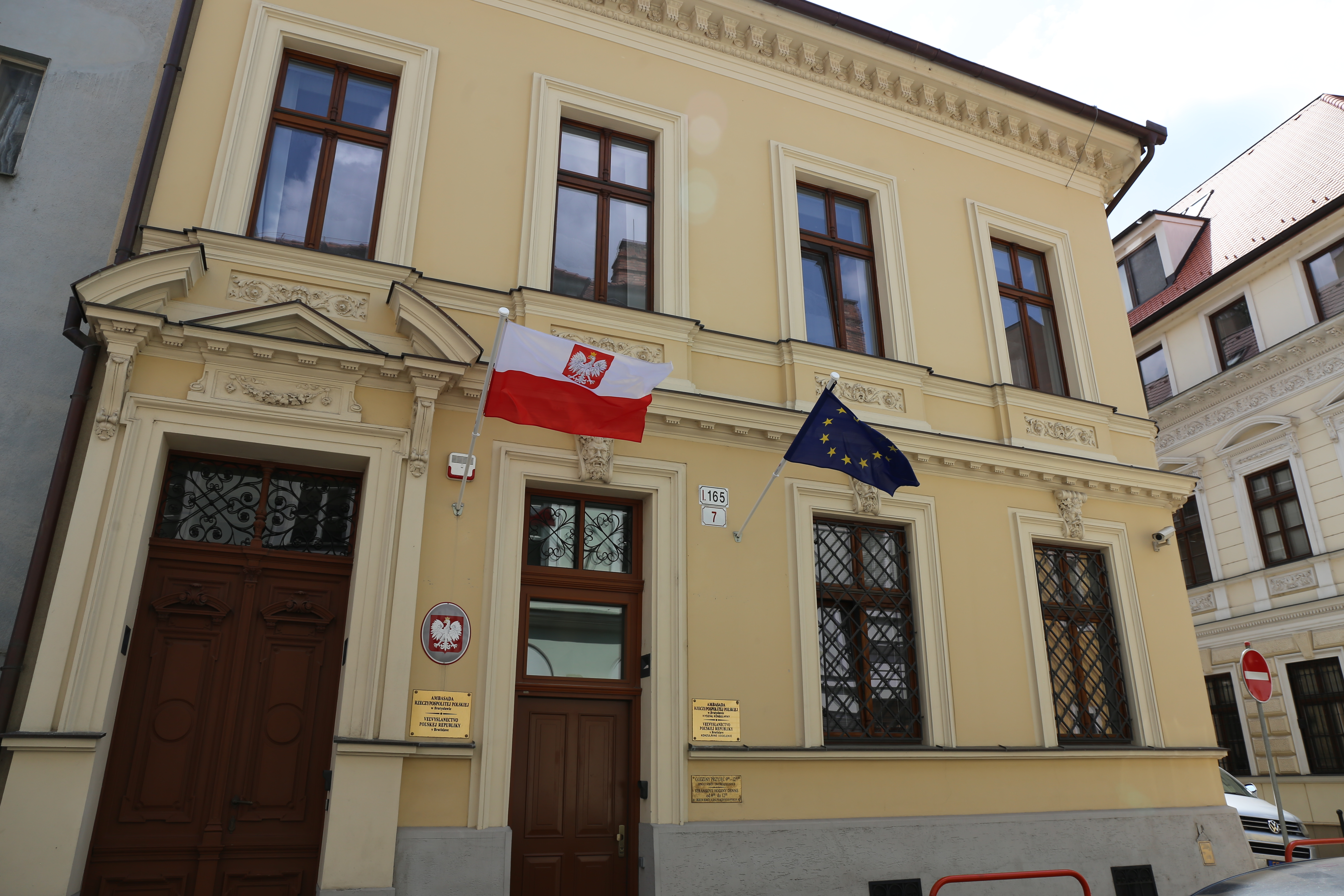
Embassy of Poland in Bratislava

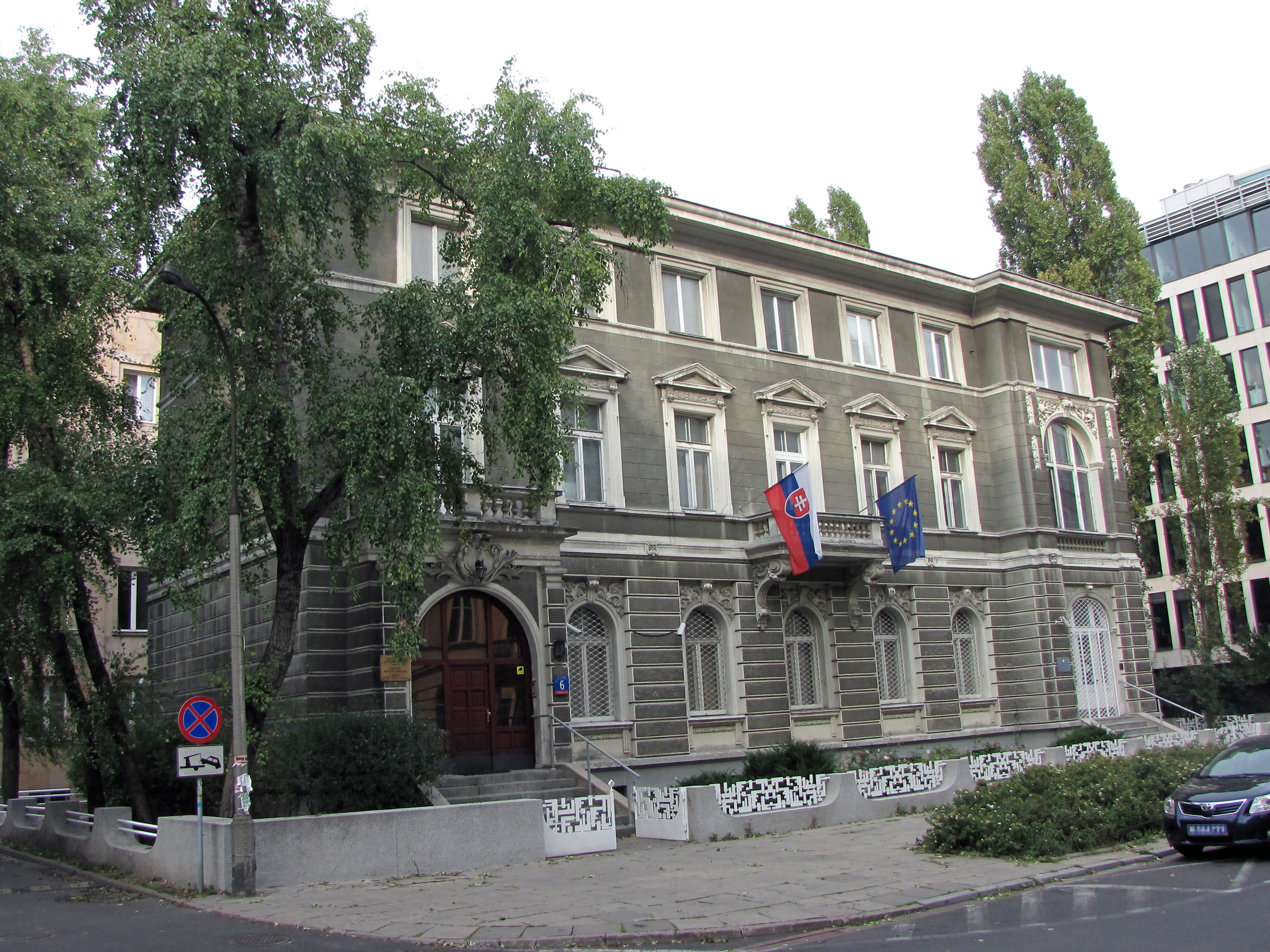
Embassy of Slovakia in Warsaw

== See also ==
- Foreign relations of Poland
- Foreign relations of Slovakia
- Czechoslovakia–Poland relations
- Poles in Slovakia
