= Holýšov =

- Town
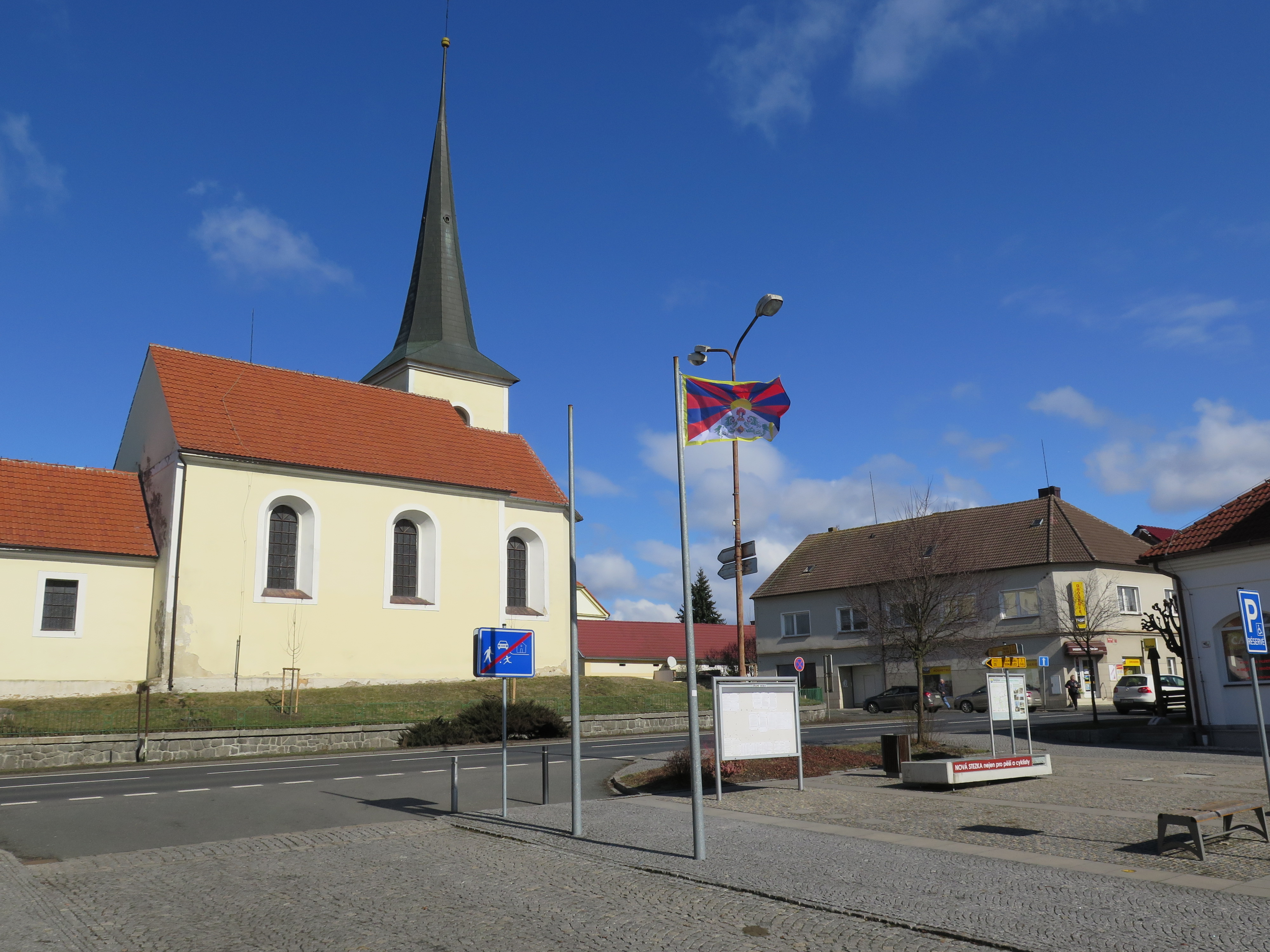
- Town square

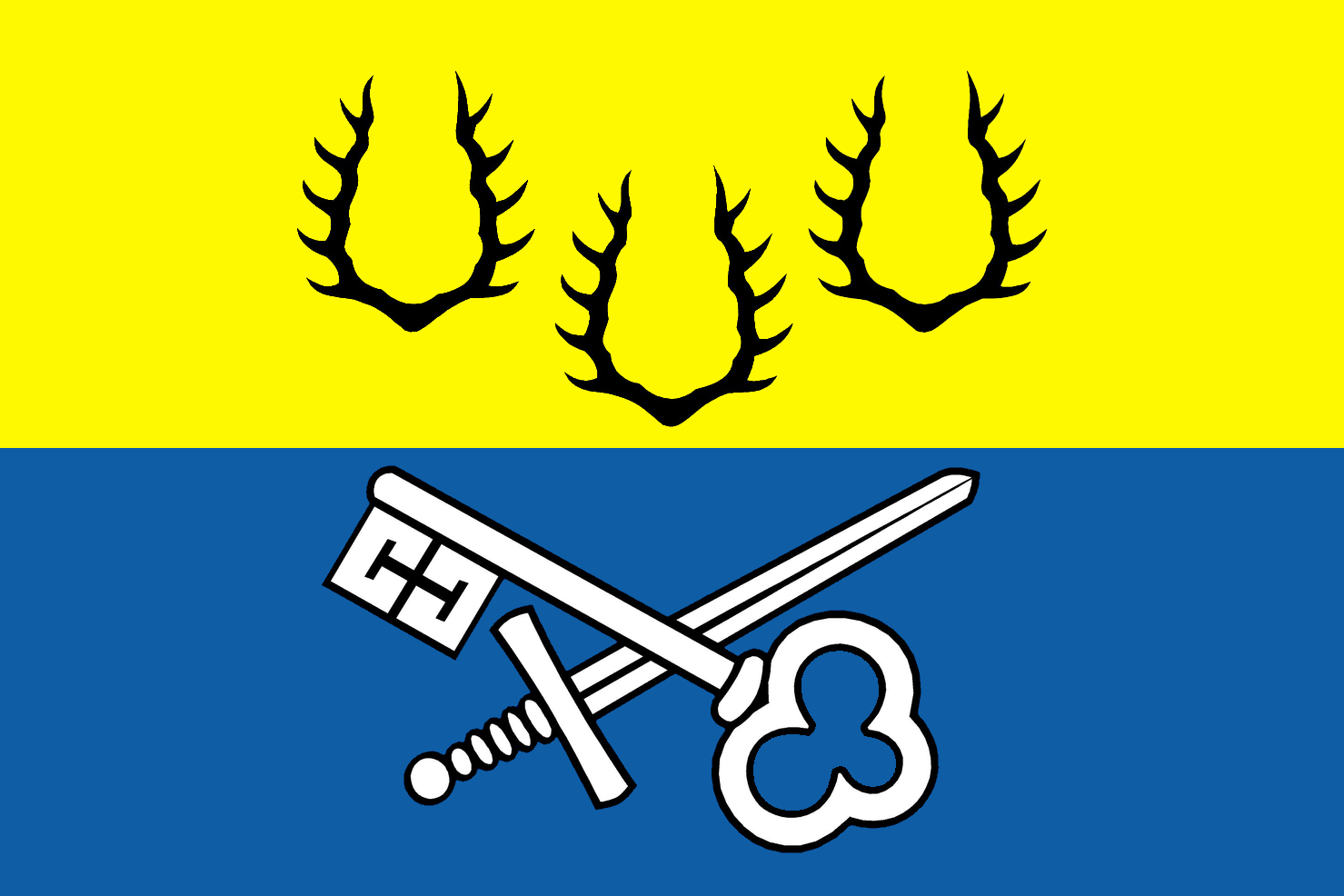
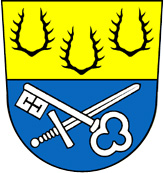
- Flag Coat of arms

- Location in the Czech Republic
- Coordinates: 49°35′34″N 13°5′50″E
- Country: Czech Republic
- Region: Plzeň
- District: Plzeň-South
- First mentioned: 1273

Government
  - Mayor: Alena Burianová

Area
  - Total: 29.32 km^{2} (11.32 sq mi)
- Elevation: 357 m (1,171 ft)

Population (2026-01-01)
  - Total: 5,436
  - Density: 185.4/km^{2} (480.2/sq mi)
- Time zone: UTC+1 (CET)
  - Summer (DST): UTC+2 (CEST)
- Postal code: 345 62
- Website: www.mestoholysov.cz

Holýšov (Czech pronunciation: [ˈɦoliːʃof]; German: Holleischen) is a town in Plzeň-South District in the Plzeň Region of the Czech Republic. It has about 5,400 inhabitants. The town is located on the Radbuza River, on the border between the Švihov Highlands and Plasy Uplands.

Holýšov was founded in the 13th century at the latest, but it became a town only in 1960. The main landmark of the town is the Church of Saints Peter and Paul.

== Administrative division ==
Holýšov consists of two municipal parts (in brackets population according to the 2021 census):

- Holýšov (4,902)
- Dolní Kamenice (123)

== Etymology ==
The name Holýšov is derived from the surname Holýš, meaning "Holýš's (court)".

== Geography ==
Holýšov is located about 25 kilometres (16 mi) southwest of Plzeň. It lies mostly in the Švihov Highlands, only the western part of the municipal territory lies in the Plasy Uplands. The highest point is a nameless hill at 516 m (1,693 ft) above sea level. The town is situated on the right bank of the Radbuza River.

== History ==
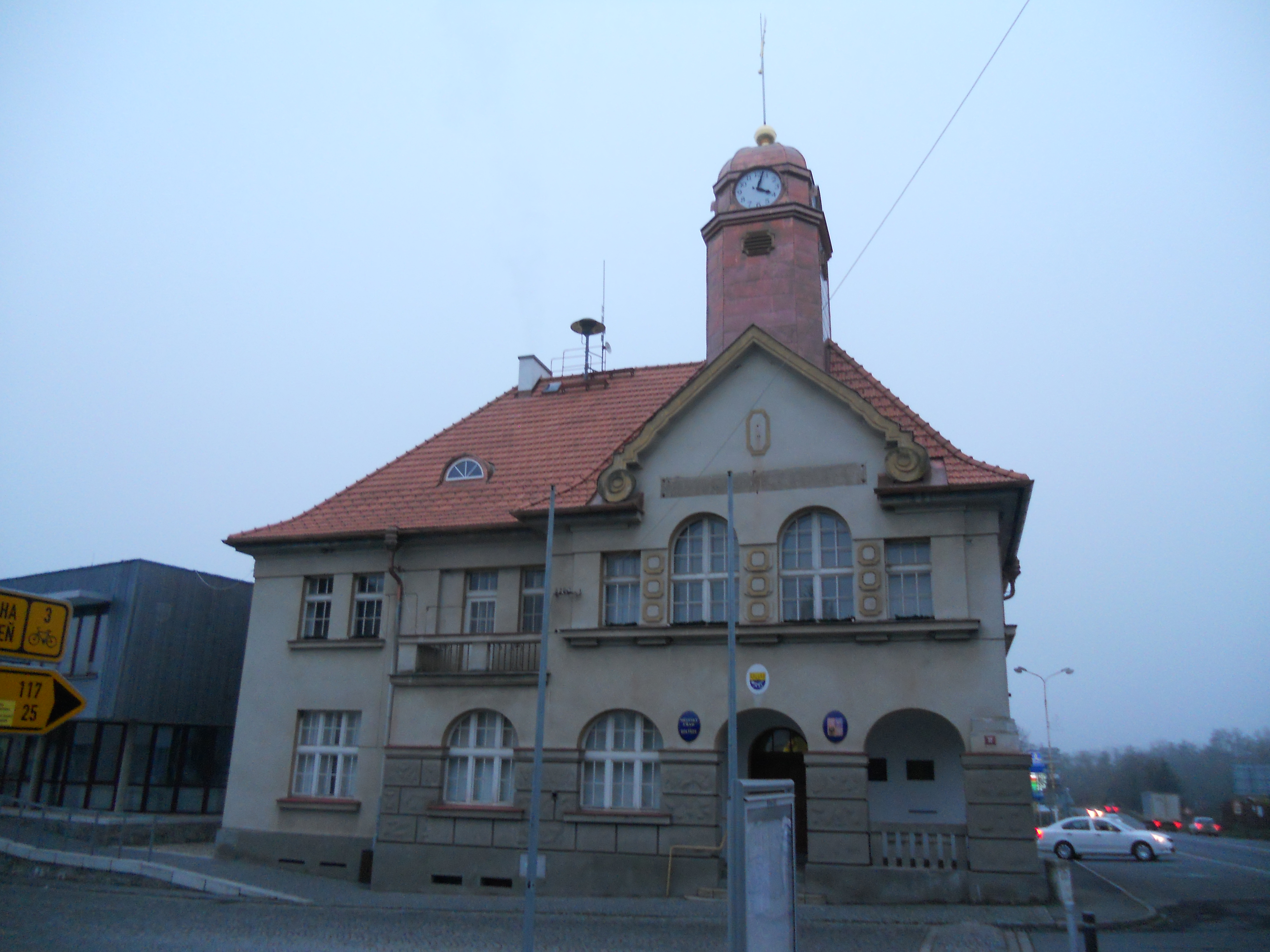
Town hall

The first written mention of Holýšov is in a deed of Pope Gregory X from 1273. Transformation from a small village to a town began after 1897, when one of the biggest glassworks in Austria-Hungary were founded and the population significantly increased. The glassworks went bankrupt due to the world crisis in the 1930s.

During World War II, Holýšov was occupied by Germany. The glassworks building was rebuilt to an ammunition factory. In 1944, two subcamps of the Flossenbürg concentration camp were founded: one for French, Polish, Russian and Jewish women, and one for Polish, Jewish, Czech and Russian men. The men's subcamp was presumably dissolved in January 1945, whereas the women's subcamp was liberated by Polish partisans in May 1945. After the German occupation, the town was restored to Czechoslovakia.

In 1960, Holýšov obtained the town status. From 1 January 2021, Holýšov is no longer a part of Domažlice District and belongs to Plzeň-South District.

== Demographics ==
Historical population

Year	Pop.	±%
1869	621	—
1880	635	+2.3%
1890	651	+2.5%
1900	913	+40.2%
1910	1,246	+36.5%

Year	Pop.	±%
1921	1,392	+11.7%
1930	1,847	+32.7%
1950	3,132	+69.6%
1961	3,793	+21.1%
1970	4,119	+8.6%

Year	Pop.	±%
1980	4,287	+4.1%
1991	4,507	+5.1%
2001	4,581	+1.6%
2011	4,907	+7.1%
2021	5,025	+2.4%

Source: Censuses

== Transport ==
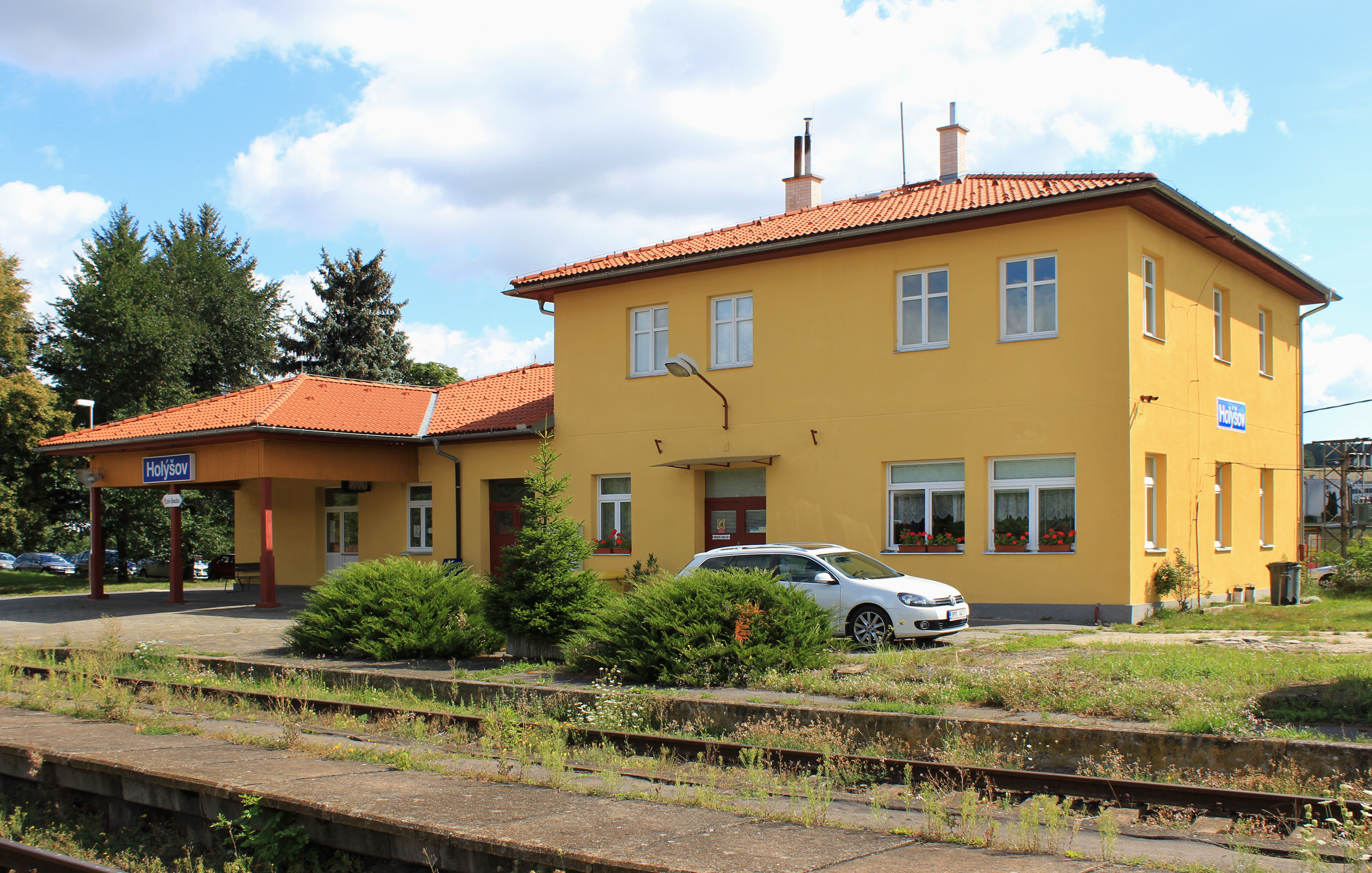
Train station

Holýšov is located on the railway line Prague–Munich via Plzeň.

== Sights ==
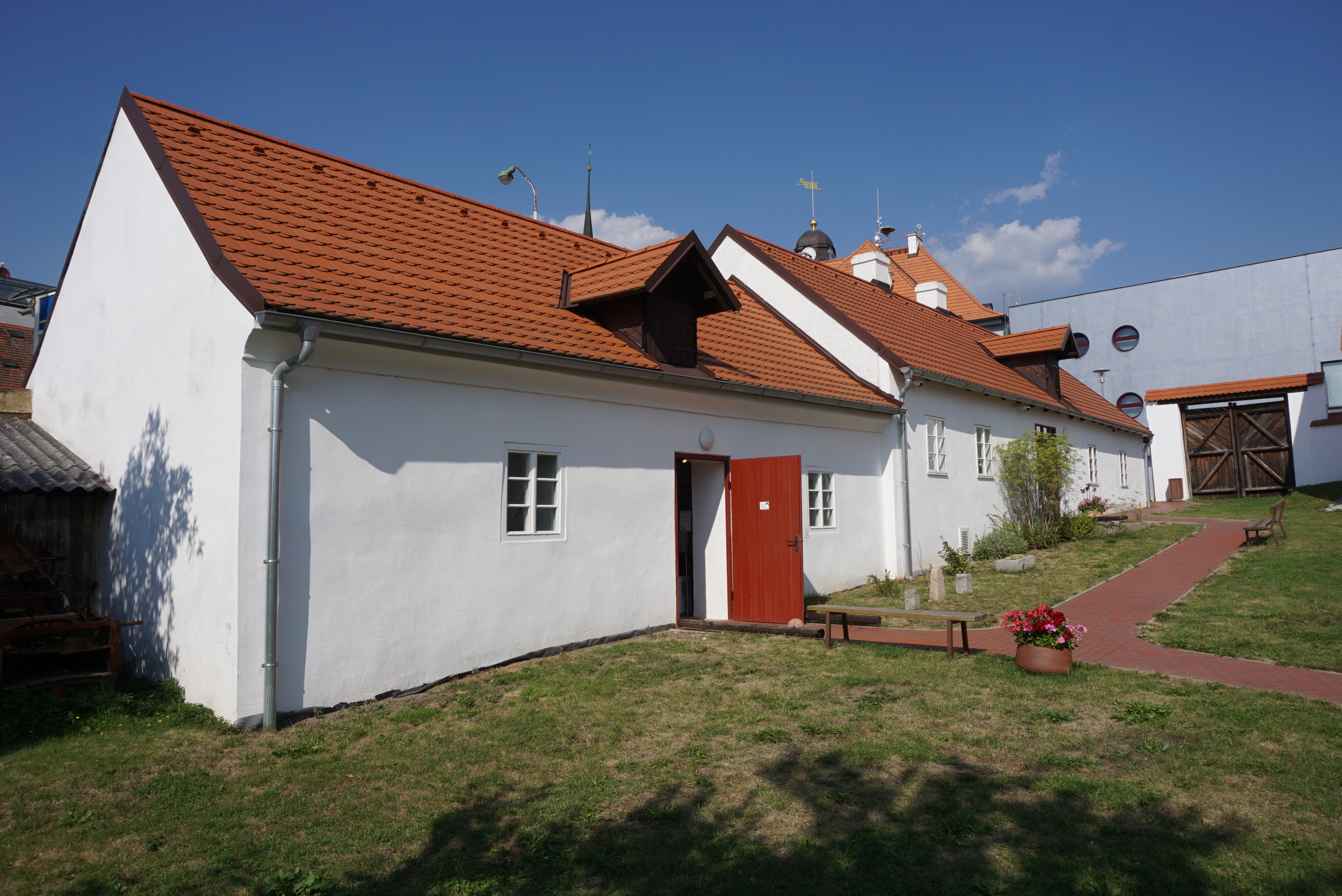
Town museum

The oldest building in Holýšov is the Church of Saints Peter and Paul. It was first mentioned in 1352 and in 1384, it was referred to as a parish church. During the Thirty Years' War, it was partly demolished. It was completely rebuilt in the Baroque style in 1743 and a three-story tower was also built, which is 39 m (128 ft) tall and topped with a tall slender spire.

Exposition dedicated to the history of Holýšov and the history of World War II in Holýšov are in the town museum named Dům dějin Holýšovska ('house of history of the Holýšov region').

== Twin towns – sister cities ==
Holýšov is twinned with:

- Kümmersbruck, Germany
- Port, Switzerland
