= Liberation of the Holýšov concentration camp =

Battle during World War II that happened in Holýšov

- Part of the Western Allied invasion of Germany and the Prague Offensive
Date	5 May 1945
Location	Holýšov, Protectorate of Bohemia and Moravia (now the Czech Republic)
Result	Polish-American victory Liberation of approximately 1,000 female prisoners Massacre of prisoners by SS prevented

Belligerents
Poland Holy Cross Brigade (NSZ); United States U.S. Third Army	(Nazi Germany) SS

Commanders and leaders
Antoni Szacki	

Strength
~1,400 soldiers	~200 SS guards

Casualties and losses
2 wounded	~200 captured

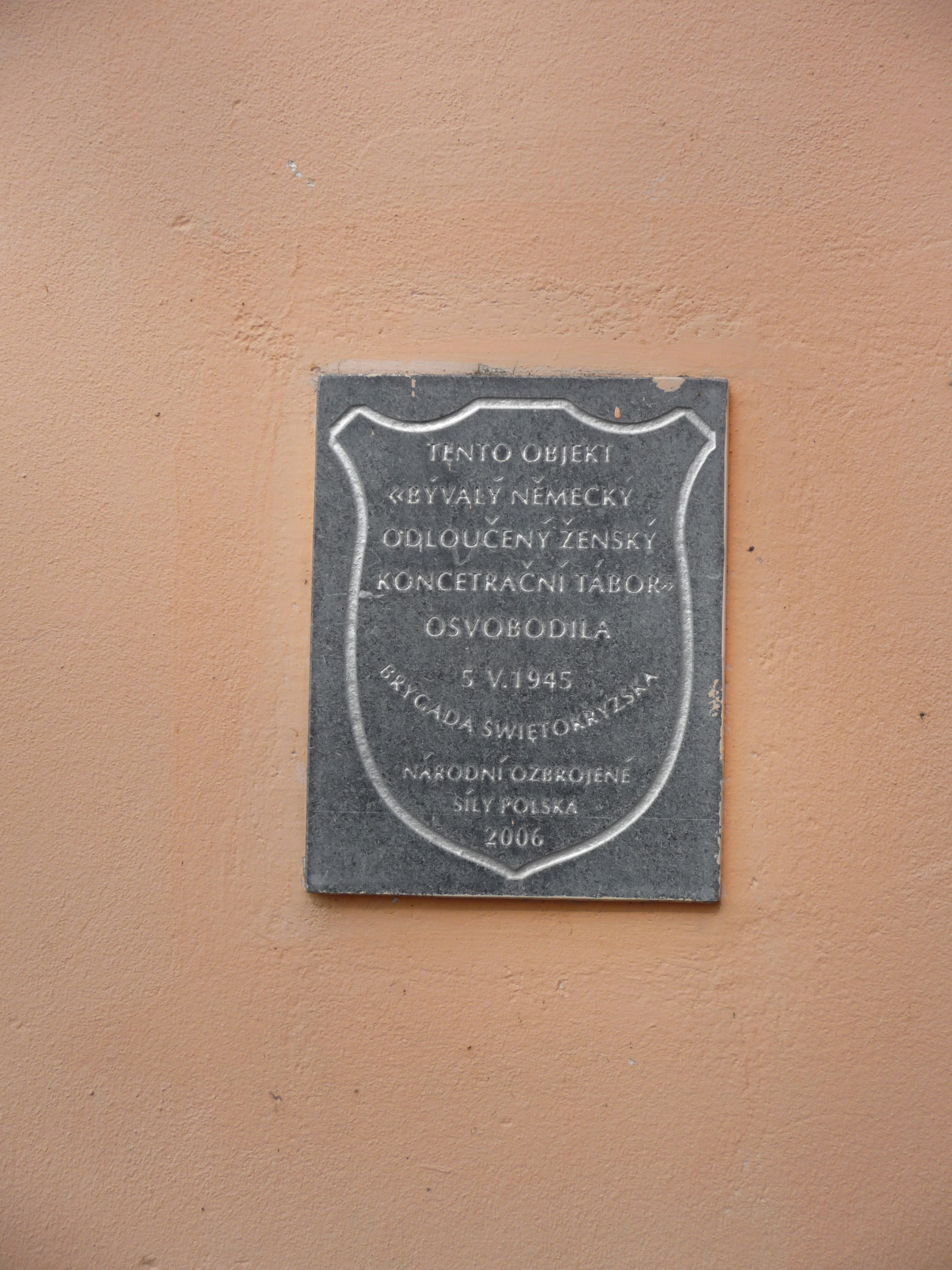
Plaque in Holýšov commemorating the liberation of the camp by the Holy Cross Mountains Brigade

On 5 May 1945, the concentration camp in German-occupied Holýšov was liberated by the Polish Holy Cross Mountains Brigade. Around 700 women were freed, as well as 200 SS members and 15 guards were imprisoned.

== Background ==
The Holy Cross Mountains Brigade, established 11 August 1944, was one of the largest formations in the National Armed Forces. In January 1945, the Brigade, in fear of being crushed by the Red Army, decided to start marching west. They set up a camp near Holýšov on 1 May 1945 and after contacting the local Czech rebels, they were informed of the concentration camp nearby.

== Liberation ==
In the evening of 4 May, the brigade met with Czech resistance leaders to plan the attack. The Czechs stated that it was too early for a liberation of the camp, but the Poles decided to coordinate it the next day due to the German plans of killing 280 prisoners before American arrival, which would most probably free the Jews. As 5 May began, the attack started and ended in a success. The number of freed women is disputed between 700 and 1,000, though it is agreed that 167 Polish and 280 Jewish women were freed. 200 SS members and 15 guards were imprisoned.
