= Polish-Bohemian alliance =

965 pact between Poland and Bohemia

The Polish Bohemian alliance was a pact made between the Polish and Bohemians around the year 965. It was formed by the marriage of Mieszko I (prince of Poland) and Dobrawa of Bohemia (princess of Bohemia). The alliance contributed to the Christianization of Poland. It subsequently provided many advantages, such as offering an escape from the control of Germans and giving the Polish more land and influence. However, the pact did not last long and it broke shortly after the death of Dobrawa of Bohemia.

== Background ==
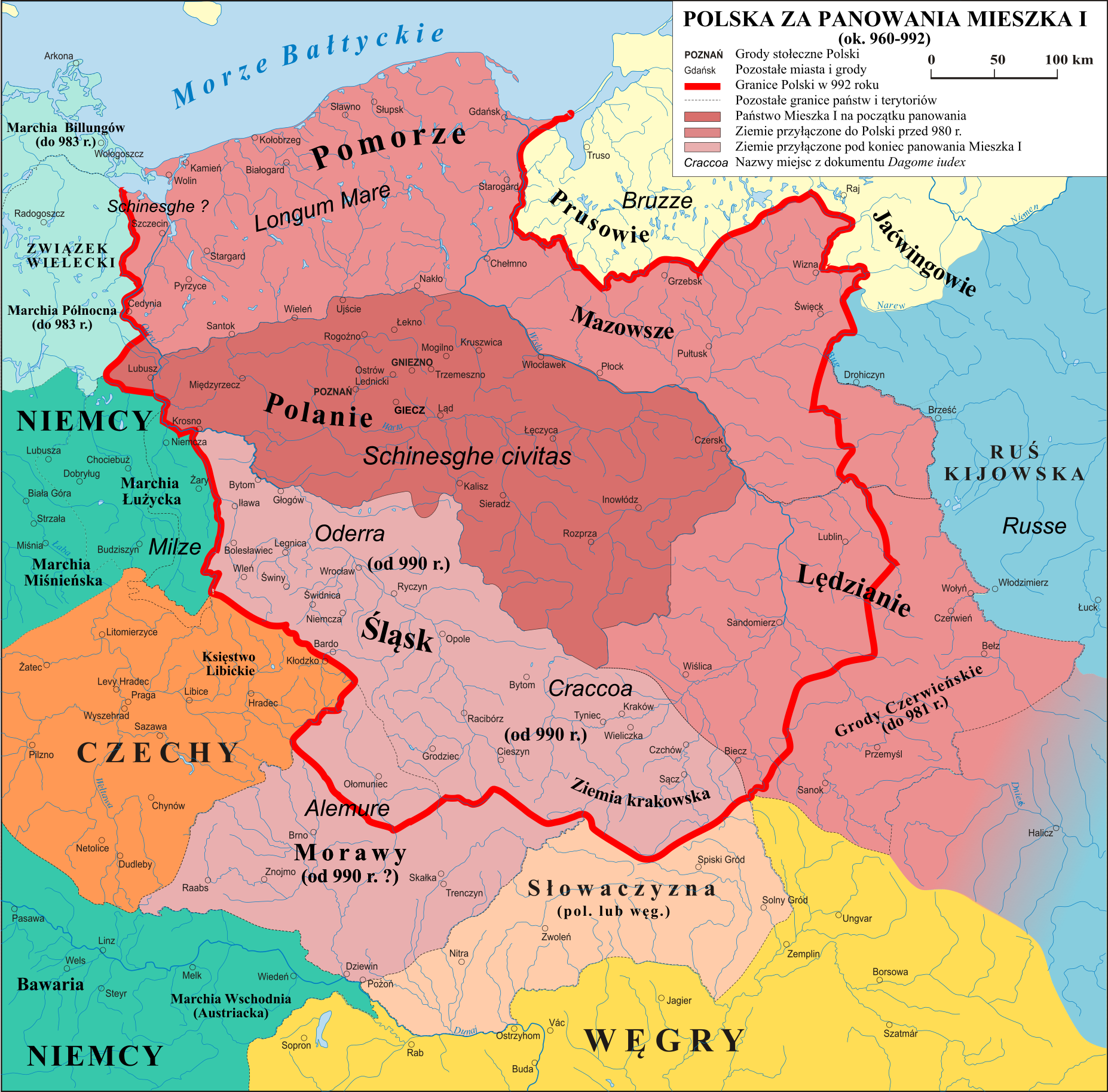
Poland and Bohemia (960-992)

Mieszko I, prince of Poland, wanted to expand the land and gain more influence in Europe. However, the task was hard to achieve at the time since Poland was still Pagan and surrounded by Christian nations such as Germany and Bohemia. The German emperor Otto I had intentions of converting Pagan lands to Christianity and to control them. Mieszko I wanted to avoid being controlled by the emperor and so he sought help from the Bohemians and they formed an alliance. The Bohemians joined the alliance because at the time it was very advantageous to them as it provided them more security.

== Conditions of alliance ==
Bohemia was already Christian when the alliance was formed and so Dobrawa of Bohemia, who married Mieszko I as a part of the alliance, saw it as one of her main goals to Christianize her husband and his nation. Christianization of Poland was a condition of the alliance. Mieszko I got baptized in 966 and the nation soon followed his footsteps. Christianization of Poland is marked as the nation's birth and is considered one of the most important dates in Polish history.

== Effects of alliance ==
The alliance helped Poland and Bohemia escape from the potential control of the Germans as well as to get away from the possible aggressions coming from other states. It also contributed to Christianization of Poland, which helped Mieszko I gain more foreign cultural experience and adopt certain elements of state organization. The alliance improved external and internal affairs. The country was more united and organized. The alliance also helped Mieszko I obtain Western Pomerania, a region at the mouth of the river Oder which played an extremely important role in commerce and economy in the ninth and tenth centuries.

The alliance gave advantages to the Bohemians as well. It safeguarded their land beyond the Carpathians and also gave them an opportunity to extend their political and religious influence to the Slavic states.

== Aftermath ==
Polish-Bohemian cooperation started to fall after Dobrawa's death in 977, and turned into an all out war in a decade (the Polish-Bohemian War of 990).
