= Polish–Czechoslovak confederation =

Political concept from the time of World War II

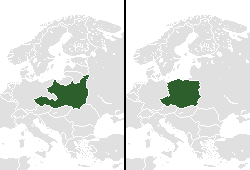
Left: Original borders before 1945. Right: Borders after 1945.

The Polish–Czechoslovak confederation, or Polish–Czechoslovak federation, (Note: As the details of the planned union were never finalized, it is not clear whether it would have been a federation or a confederation. Sources use both the term "Polish–Czechoslovak federation" and the term "Polish–Czechoslovak confederation".) was a political concept from the time of World War II, supported by the Polish government-in-exile and, to a lesser extent, the United Kingdom and the United States. It was a revitalisation of the Intermarium concept, proposing the creation of a federation based on Poland and Czechoslovakia. The project had less support in the Czechoslovak government-in-exile, which believed it did not need Polish support against the Soviet Union, and was eventually sunk by the growing Soviet dominance, as Joseph Stalin did not want a strong and independent federation in Europe that could threaten his designs for Eastern Europe.

== Background ==
Soon after the Polish defeat in the Polish September Campaign, both the Polish and Czechoslovak governments (Czechoslovakia having been reduced to a German protectorate following the Munich Agreement) formed in exile in the West. However, despite a common enemy, Czechoslovakia–Poland relations were less than friendly because of Polish–Czechoslovak border conflicts. The Polish government aimed to revitalize the Międzymorze federation concept and to create a strong federation of states in Central and Eastern Europe, revolving around Poland and Czechoslovakia, as a barrier to further German and Soviet aggression. The Czechoslovak government, initially split between two groups (those of Milan Hodža and Edvard Beneš), was tentatively supportive of the idea, at least publicly.

== Negotiations ==
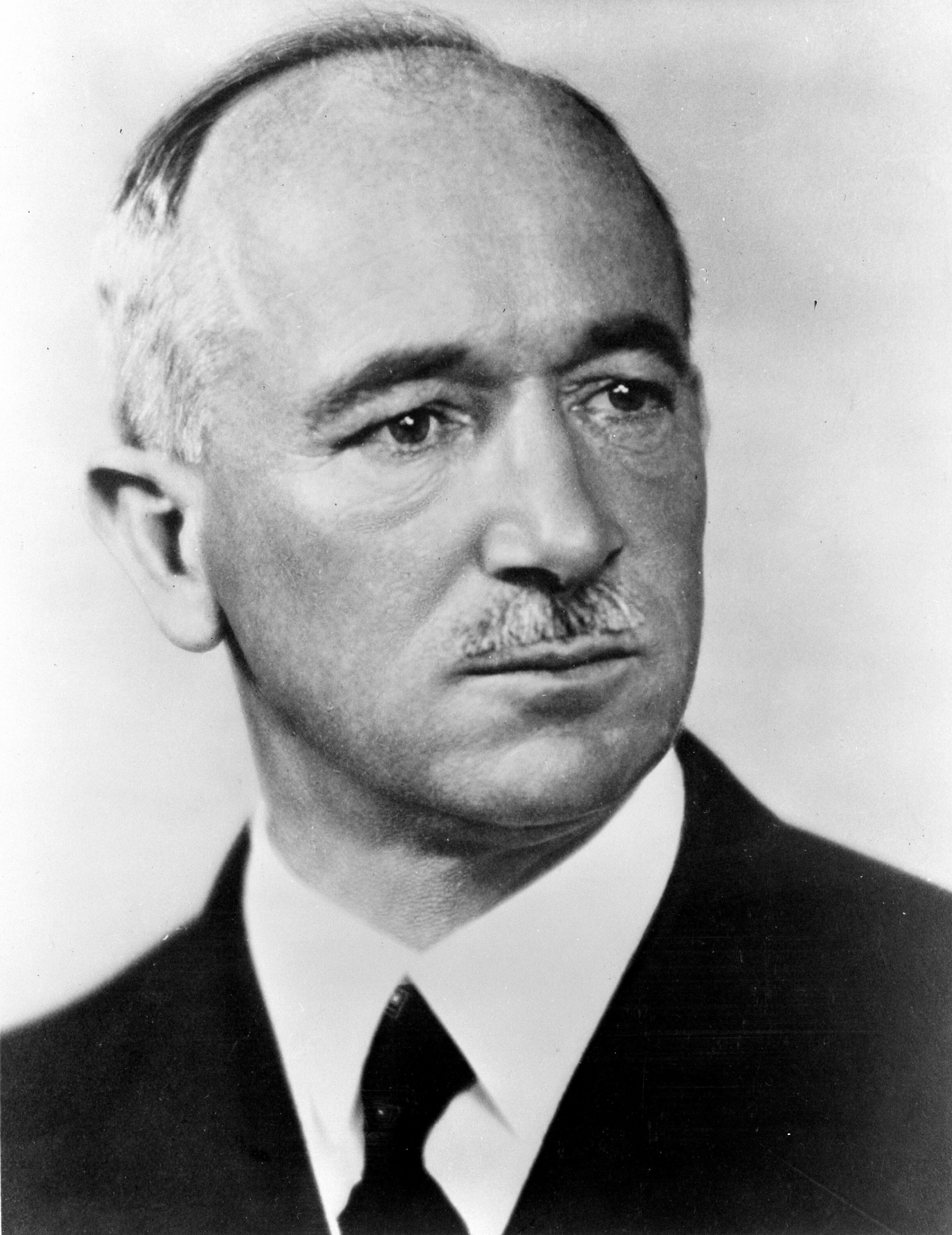
Edvard Beneš, leader of the Czechoslovak government in exile

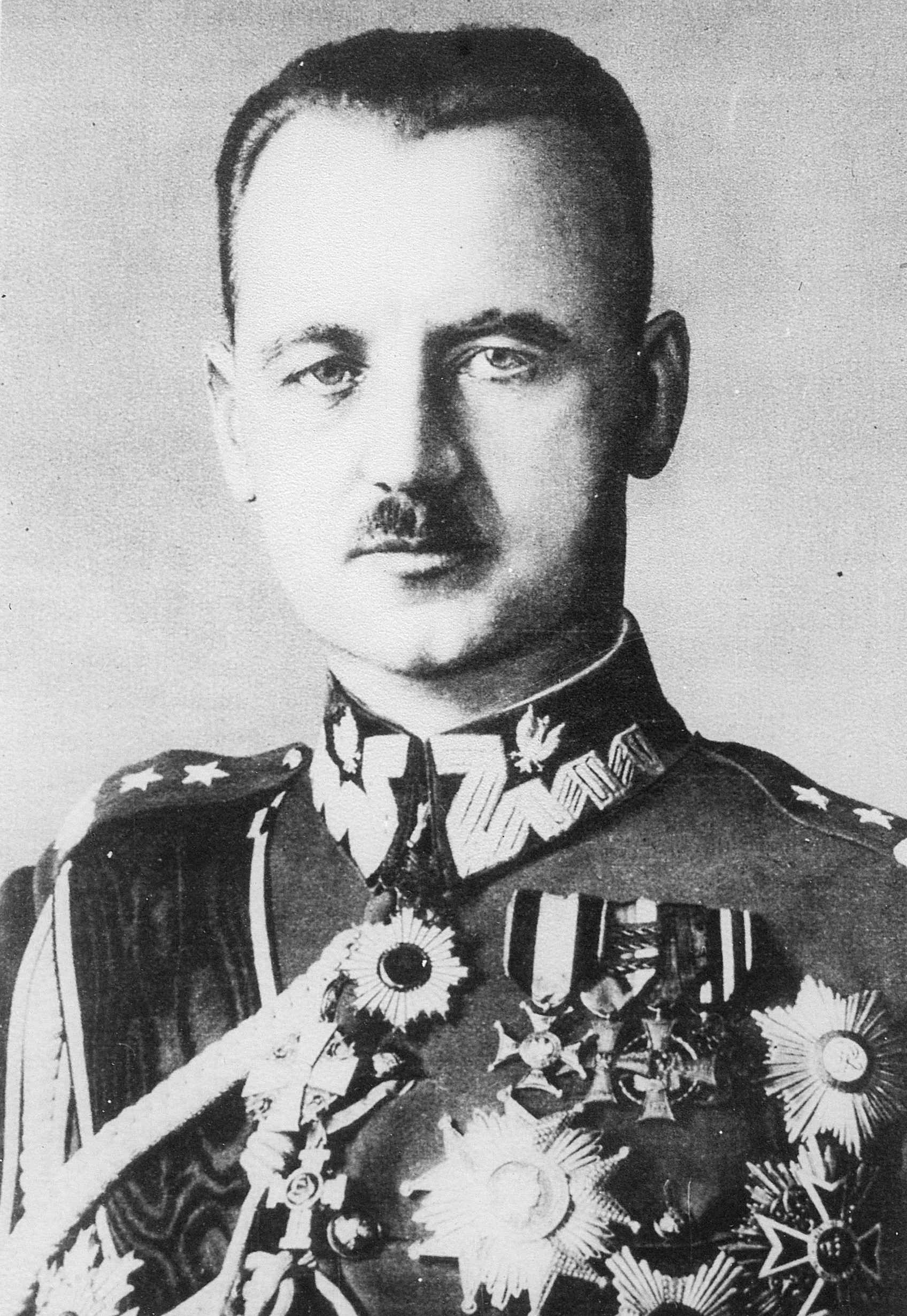
Władysław Sikorski, leader of the Polish government in exile

Czechoslovak politicians Hodža and Jan Masaryk both wanted a confederation, Beneš was more lukewarm; his goal was to ensure that the disputed Trans-Olza territory that had passed to Poland in the aftermath of the Munich Agreement was regained by Czechoslovakia, and that became one of the major issues of contention in the ongoing negotiations. Beneš, who saw regaining the territory as a primary objective, saw the Soviet Union, particularly in the aftermath of the Soviet invasion of Poland, as a potential ally and as a counterbalance to Poland, and he would steadily align his government more with the Soviet Union than Poland in the belief that an alliance with a powerful country would be more beneficial to Czechoslovakia than a federation with several other smaller powers. That was quite contrary to the Polish attitude, as the Polish leader of that time, Władysław Sikorski, saw the Soviet Union as a major threat to the postwar European order.

Thus, when Sikorski approached Beneš and proposed discussions over a future Polish-Czechoslovak federation in 1939, aiming to create a stronger postwar Poland and Czechoslovakia, Beneš's response was lukewarm at best, as he was not interested in strengthening Poland. He was content to see Czechoslovakia re-established within its pre-1938 borders.

Nonetheless, Beneš did not refuse Sikorski's proposal outright, as the federation proposal was supported by the UK and later by the US, which also supported the plans for other federations such as the Greek-Yugoslav confederation. He was afraid that open refusal would lead to the Poles opening negotiations with the Czechoslovak opposition or to his government being marginalized by the British Foreign Office. Beneš decided to continue the negotiations with the Poles over the possibility of federation but with little haste; in fact, many of the Czechoslovak government's moves were designed to prolong the negotiations without any real commitment. The negotiations proceeded slowly, with numerous conferences, and with joint declarations on 11 November 1940 (a declaration by the two governments about entering "a closer political and economic association"), on 23 January 1942 (in which both governments agreed to form a confederation after the war and mentioned common policies on diplomacy, defense, trade, education and communication) and on 10 June 1942. January 1941 saw the establishment of the Czechoslovak-Polish Coordinating Committee to oversee the process of the negotiations.

Some early proposals focused on economic co-operation, unified foreign policy, a customs union and a common currency but separate government offices. A Polish proposal from 1941 called for the co-ordination of foreign and economic policies, including total economic unification. Beneš tried to frame the potential federation as no more than a tool for mutual defense against Germany and argued that the Soviet Union was not a threat but a potential ally. The Czechoslovak position was so pro-Soviet that the Beneš government passed secret documents from the Czech-Polish negotiations to the Soviets and assured them that they were acting in the best interests of Czechoslovakia-Soviet Union relations.

The Soviets saw the Polish-led federation of Central and Eastern European states as a threat to their planned sphere of influence. They put further pressure on the Czechoslovak government, with promises of alliance and territorial guarantees. By late 1942 and early 1943, as the Soviet Union's position was boosted by its military victories, Czechoslovak-Soviet cooperation became much stronger; on 12 November 1942, the Czechoslovak side suspended talks with the Poles until permission from the Soviet Union had been obtained, and on 10 February 1943, the Czechoslovak diplomat Hubert Ripka informed the Polish government that no agreement that could be seen as antagonistic towards the Soviet Union would be supported by the Czechoslovak government. That was a major blow to the Polish-Czechoslovak negotiations.

== Aftermath ==
Soon afterward, Poland and the Soviet Union broke diplomatic relations over the Katyń massacre. Beneš, meanwhile, focused on pursuing a Czechoslovakia-Soviet alliance. The death of Sikorski that year was another major blow to the planned federation, as he was seen as the plan's major supporter in the international scene. In December 1943, a new Treaty of Alliance (for 20 years) was signed between the Czechoslovak government in exile and the Soviet Union in Moscow, and a Treaty of Military Co-operation between the two followed next spring.

Beneš's support for the Soviet Union went so far that during his 1943 visit to the US, he argued that the Soviet Union would never be a threat to either Czechoslovakia or Poland. Beneš probably saw the threat of identity loss for Czechoslovakia and the Czechoslovak people in such a federation as more likely than the threat of a conflict or takeover by the Soviet Union, which he perceived as a benevolent ally. In the end, the Polish federation plan came to naught; instead, the short-term victory with regard to the Central and Eastern European geopolitical scene went to Beneš, and in the long term, it went to his Soviet allies.

Czechoslovakia would regain most of the disputed Trans-Olza territory, but by 1948, both it and Poland would have only nominal independence, as they would fall to communist takeovers and become part of the Soviet sphere of influence. Beneš died in 1948, soon after the communists took power in the Czechoslovak coup d'état of 1948 and forced him to retire from politics.

== See also ==
- Greek–Yugoslav confederation
- Union of Hungary and Romania
