= Doubravka of Bohemia =

10th-century Bohemian princess and Duchess consort of the Polans

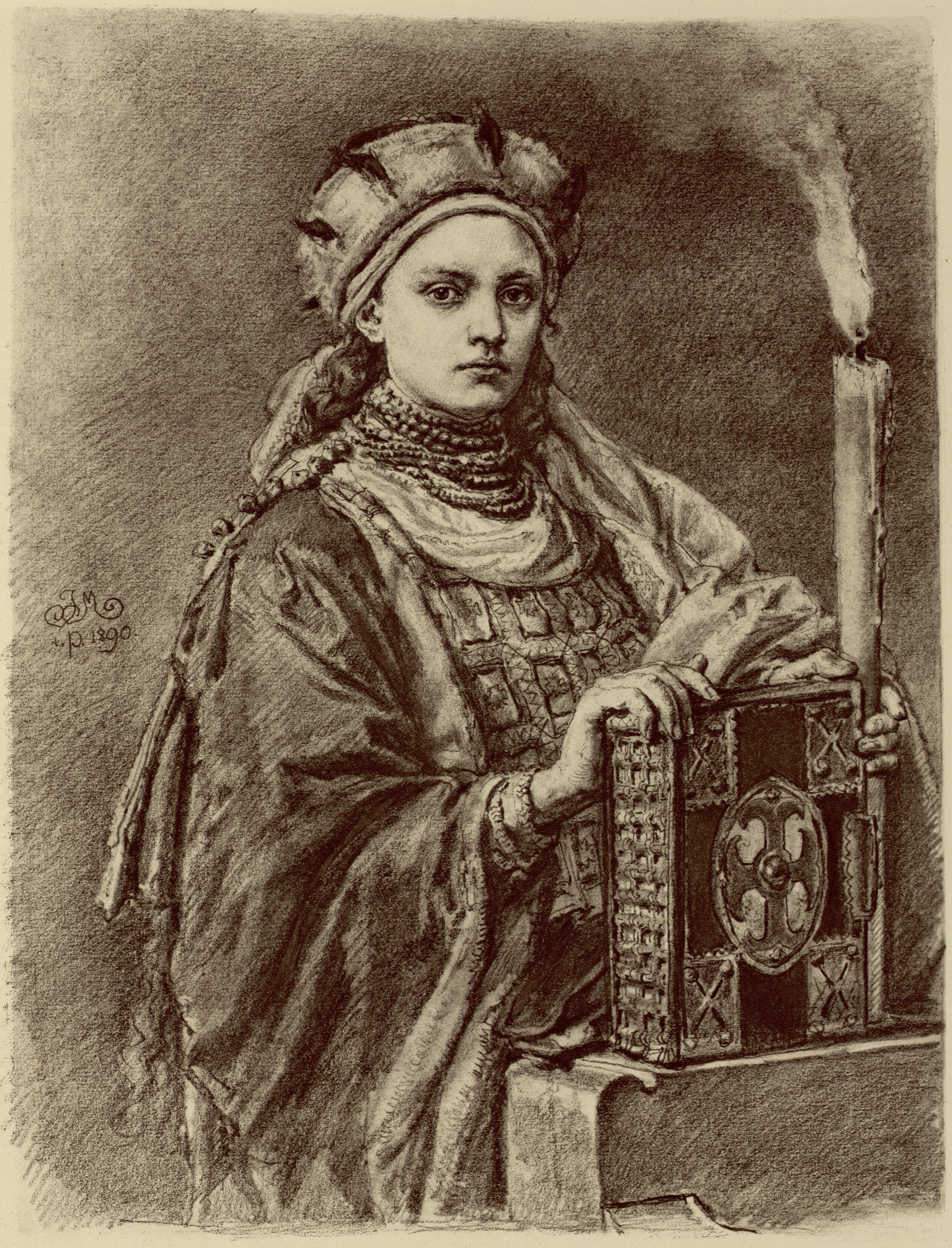
- Doubravka, as imagined by Jan Matejko

Duchess consort of the Polans
- Tenure: 965–977
- Born: c. 940/45
- Died: 977
- Spouse: Gunther of Mersburg (possibly) (div. or ann. before 965); Mieszko I of Poland (m. 965)
- Issue: Known: Bolesław I the Brave; Possible: Gunzelin of Meissen; Vladivoj
- House: Přemyslid
- Father: Boleslaus I, Duke of Bohemia

Doubravka of Bohemia, Dobrawa (Czech: Doubravka Přemyslovna, Polish: Dobrawa, Dąbrówka; c. 940/45 – 977) was a Bohemian princess of the Přemyslid dynasty and Duchess of the Polans by her marriage to Mieszko I of Poland.

She was the daughter of Boleslaus I the Cruel, Duke of Bohemia, whose wife may have been the mysterious Biagota, and had been already divorced or widowed by the time she married Mieszko.

According to near-contemporary sources, Doubravka urged her Polish husband to accept baptism in 966, the year after their marriage. Modern historians believe, however, that the change of religion by Mieszko was one of the points discussed in the Polish-Bohemian agreement concluded soon before his marriage with Doubravka. Her role in his conversion is not considered now to be as important as it is often represented in medieval chronicles.

== Early life ==
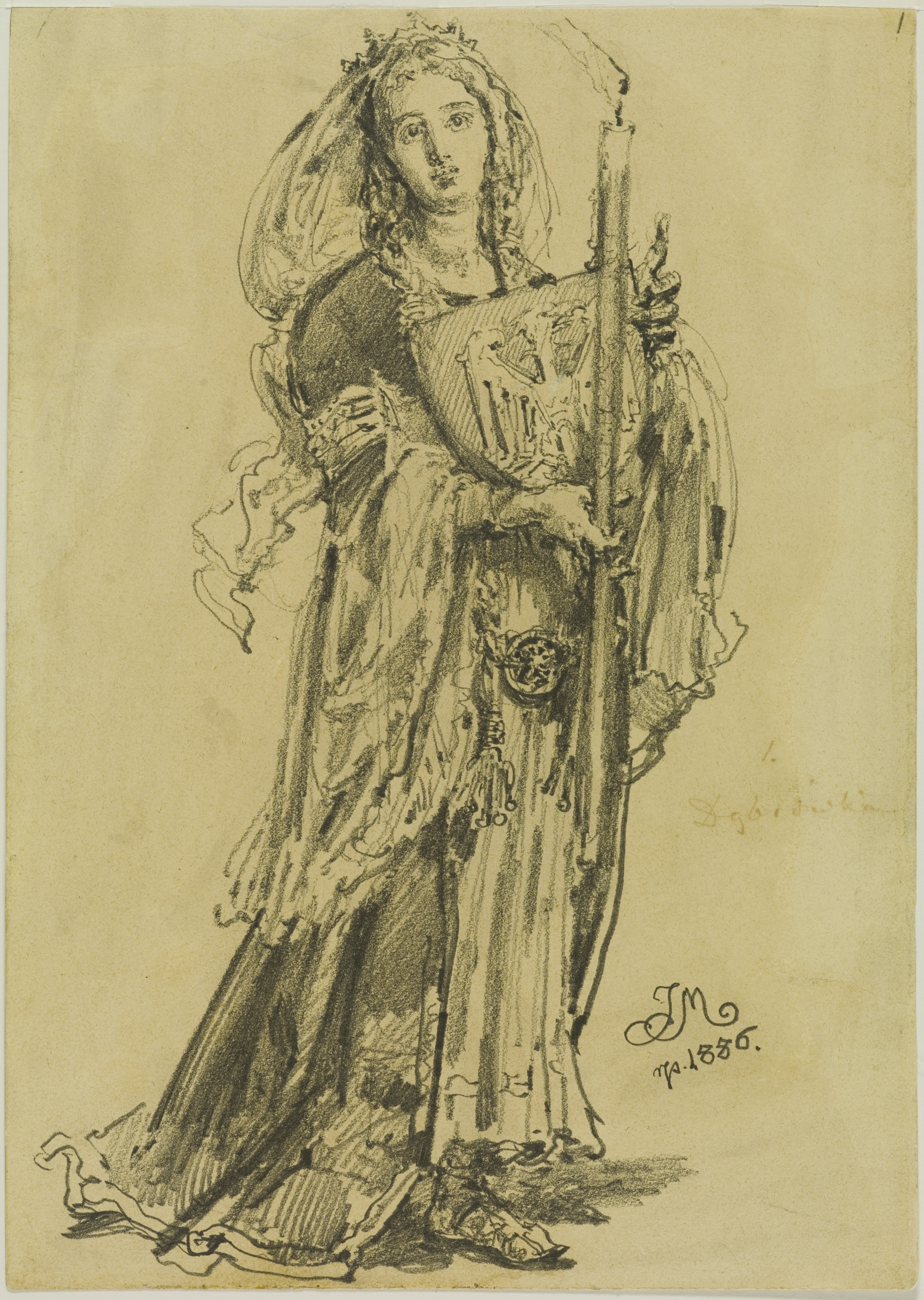
Doubravka of Bohemia (Dobrawa) according to Jan Matejko (1886)

Doubravka's date of birth is not known. The only indication is communicated by the chronicler Cosmas of Prague, who stated that the Bohemian princess at the time of her marriage with Mieszko I was an old woman. The passage is regarded as tendentious and of little reliability, and some researchers believe that the statement was made with malicious intent. It is possible that in the statement about Doubravka's age, Cosmas was making a reference to the age difference between her and her sister Mlada. That would give him a basis for determining Doubravka as "old." (The word Mlada means Young). It was also found that Cosmas confuses Doubravka with Mieszko I's second wife Oda, who at the time of her marriage was around 19–25 years old, a relatively advanced age for a bride according to the customs of the Middle Ages. Some researchers have taken up speculative views, such as Jerzy Strzelczyk, who assumed that in the light of contemporary concepts and habits of marriage of that time (when as a rule marriages were contracted with teenage girls) is assumed that Doubravka had passed her early youth, so, it's probable that she was in her late teens or twenties.

Nothing is known about Doubravka's childhood and youth. Thietmar of Merseburg in his chronicles named Gunzelin, Gunther of Merseburg's son, a 'brother' [frater] to Bolesław I the Brave, thus implying Gunzelin was Doubravka's son, and Gunther was her first husband. This was disputed in 1895 by Oswald Balzer whose position caused many historians to believe that Gunzelin and Bolesław I were in fact cousins or brothers-in-law; however, Michael Morys-Twarowski argues that Thiethmar was always describing one's brother-in-law by word gener, not frater as in case of Gunzelin. Kamil Janicki agrees with Balzer, but nevertheless points that Doubravka had had a husband before marrying Mieszko, as she was reported to strip herself from peplum capitis (headcloth worn by married women and widows) when she left her homeland to wed the Polish Duke. He believes Doubravka's first husband was most likely Bohemian subject of her father, who died before 965, leaving the Princess a widow.

== Marriage and Christianization of Poland ==
In the second half of 964 an alliance between Boleslav I the Cruel, Duke of Bohemia, and Mieszko I of Poland was concluded. In order to consolidate the agreement, in 965 Boleslav I's daughter Doubravka was married to Mieszko I. The marriage cemented the Polish-Bohemian alliance, which continued even after Doubravka's death.

Two independent sources attribute to Doubravka an important role in the conversion to Christianity of Mieszko I and Poland. The first is the chronicles of Thietmar, who was born two years before the death of Doubravka. He wrote that the Bohemian princess tried to persuade her husband to accept Christianity (even at the cost of breaking their marriage and with it the Polish-Bohemian alliance). In the end, she finally obtained the conversion of Mieszko I and with him, of all Poland. In turn, the 12th-century chronicler Gallus Anonymus says that Doubravka came to Poland surrounded by secular and religious dignitaries. She agreed to marry Mieszko I providing that he was baptized. The Polish ruler accepted, and only then was able to marry the Bohemian princess.

Modern historians agree that the baptism of Mieszko I was dictated by political benefits and should not be attributed to any action of Doubravka. She is held to have had virtually no role in the conversion of her husband. Historians note that the narrative of the conversion of Mieszko I thanks to Doubravka formed part of the tradition of the Church which stressed the conversion of Pagan rulers through the influence of women.

Doubravka did have a significant role in the Christianization of the Poles. In her wedding procession, she arrived in Poland with Christian clergymen, among them possibly Jordan, ordained the first bishop of Poland in 968. Tradition attributes to Doubravka the establishment of the Holy Trinity and St. Wit Churches in Gniezno and the Church of the Virgin Mary in Ostrów Tumski, Poznań.

== Children ==
Gunzelin of Meissen might have been Doubravka's son from her first marriage.

Doubravka had by Mieszko I at least one son, Bolesław the Brave (b. 967 – d. 17 June 1025). A daughter of Mieszko, that used to be called by historians Świętosława was for long time identified with Sigrid the Haughty, wife first to King Eric the Victorious of Sweden and later King Sweyn Forkbeard of Denmark, by whom she was the mother of Canute the Great. However modern research suggests that this daughter, known in non-Polish sources on her as Gunhilda, was married only to Swyen Forkbeard; while she was believed previously to be a daughter of Doubravka, both timeline of events and her name suggests she was more likely to be a daughter of Mieszko's next wife, Oda of Haldensleben.

There is a hypothesis asserting the existence of another daughter of Mieszko I who was married to a Pomeranian Slavic prince. She could have been the daughter of either Doubravka or one of Mieszko's previous pagan wives. Also, a theory has been advanced (apparently recorded by Thietmar of Prague and supported by Oswald Balzer in 1895) that Vladivoj (c. 981 – January 1003), who ruled as duke of Bohemia from 1002 until 1003, was another son of Doubravka and Mieszko I. Czech historiography has supported the notion of mixed Piast-Přemyslid parentage for Vladivoj.

== Death and burial ==
Doubravka died in 977. In his study of 1888, Józef Ignacy Kraszewski wrote that "her tomb was discovered in Gniezno Cathedral. It was a simple stone marked with a cross. Purple robes and a weighty gold loincloth were the only objects found in her tomb." A similar view of Doubravka's burial place was expressed earlier, in 1843, by Edward Raczyński in his study Wspomnienia Wielkopolski to jest województw poznańskiego, kaliskiego i gnieźnieńskiego (Memories of the Greater Poland districts of Poznań, Kalisz and Gniezno). However, the burial place of the Bohemian princess is now considered to be unknown.

Doubravka's death weakened the Polish-Bohemian alliance, which finally collapsed in the mid-980s.

Doubravka of Bohemia Přemyslid dynasty Born: c. 940/45 Died: 977
Royal titles
Preceded by Gorka	Duchess consort of the Polans; 965–977	Succeeded by Oda of Haldensleben
