= Lipnica Mała =

Lipnica Mała Felsőlipnica
- Village
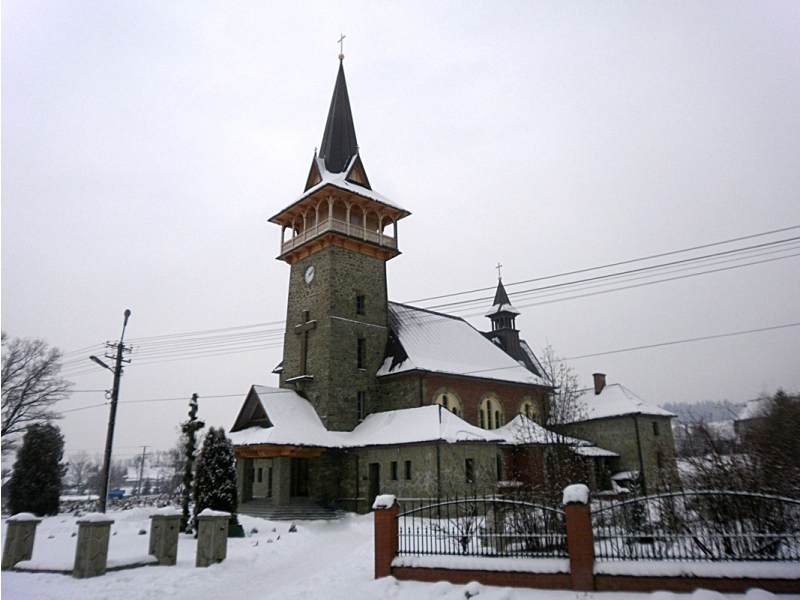
- Saint Stephen church

- Location within Poland
- Coordinates: 49°30′39″N 19°38′14″E
- Country: Poland
- Voivodeship: Lesser Poland
- County: Nowy Targ
- Gmina: Jabłonka
- Population: 3,673
- Time zone: UTC+1 (CET)
  - Summer (DST): UTC+2 (CEST)
- Postal code: 34-482
- Vehicle registration: KNT

Lipnica Mała (Polish: [lipˈɲit͡sa ˈmawa]; Hungarian: Felsőlipnica) is a village in the administrative district of Gmina Jabłonka, within Nowy Targ County, Lesser Poland Voivodeship, in southern Poland, close to the border with Slovakia.

== Geography ==
The village lies 6 kilometers north-west of Jabłonka in the drainage basin of the Black Sea (through Orava, Váh and Danube rivers), in the historical region of Orava (Polish: Orawa).

== History ==
In his geographical dictionary published in 1851, Elek Fényes, writes the following about the village: “Felső-Lipnicza, a Tót village in Árva County: 1,514 Catholic inhabitants, who weave a great deal of coarse homespun cloth. Extensive sheep farming. Its sessio is 83. It belongs to the Árva estate.”

In 1880, the village had a predominantly Polish population of 1,614. It became part of Poland following World War I.

Until the Treaty of Trianon, it belonged to the Trsztena district of Árva County of Hungary.
