= Harkabuz =

- Village
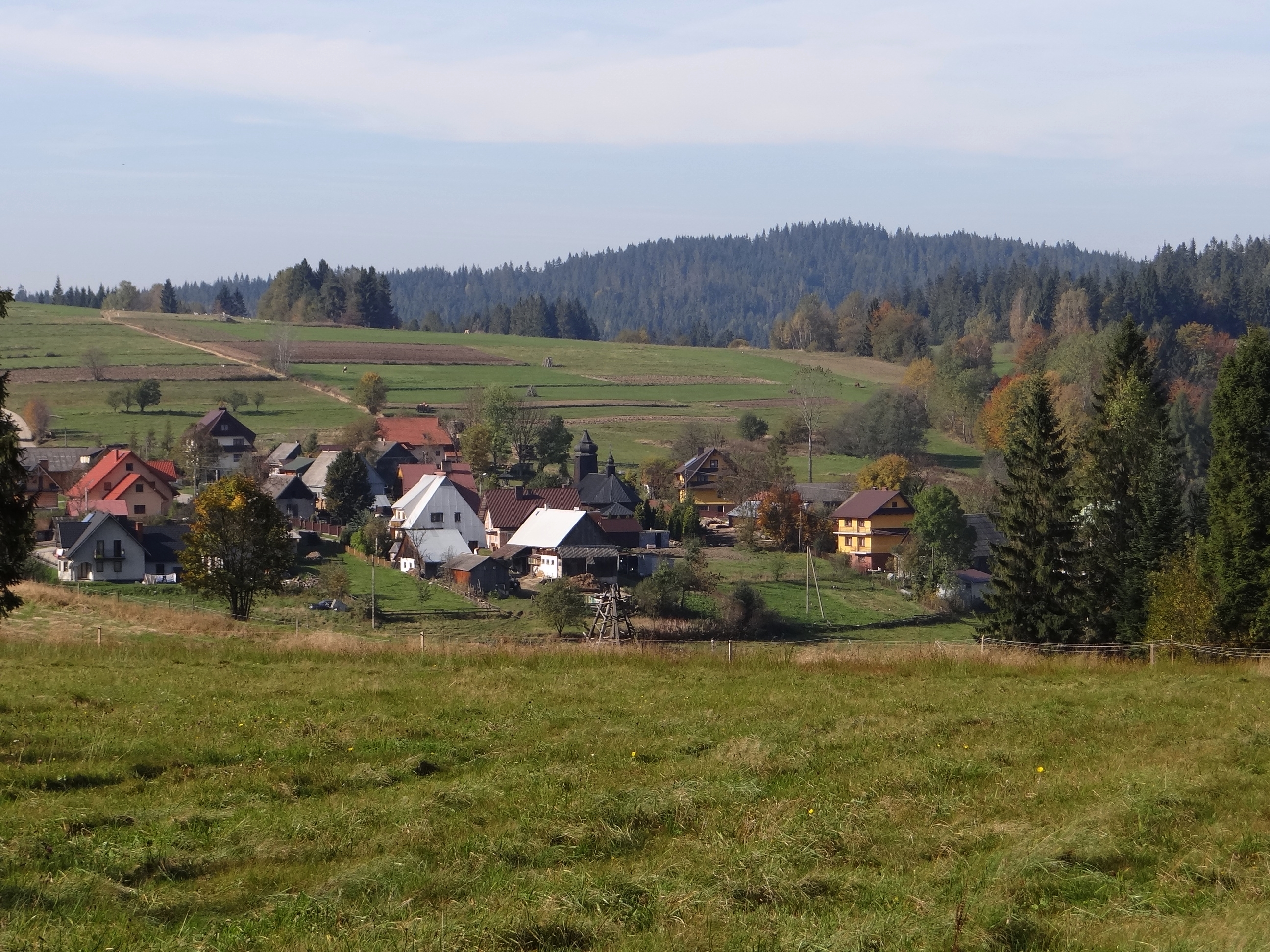

- Location within Poland
- Coordinates: 49°33′N 19°51′E
- Country: Poland
- Voivodeship: Lesser Poland
- County: Nowy Targ
- Gmina: Raba Wyżna
- Population: 537
- Time zone: UTC+1 (CET)
  - Summer (DST): UTC+2 (CEST)
- Postal code: 34-721
- Vehicle registration: KNT

Harkabuz [xarˈkabus] is a village in the administrative district of Gmina Raba Wyżna, within Nowy Targ County, Lesser Poland Voivodeship, in southern Poland.

The village lies in the drainage basin of the Black Sea (through Orava, Váh and Danube rivers), in the historical region of Orava (Polish: "Orawa").

== History ==
The area became part of Poland in the 10th or early 11th century, and later it passed to Hungary. In the late 19th century, Harkabuz had a population of 394, 92.9% Polish. It became again part of Poland following World War I.
