= Orawka, Lesser Poland Voivodeship =

Orawka Kisárva
- Village
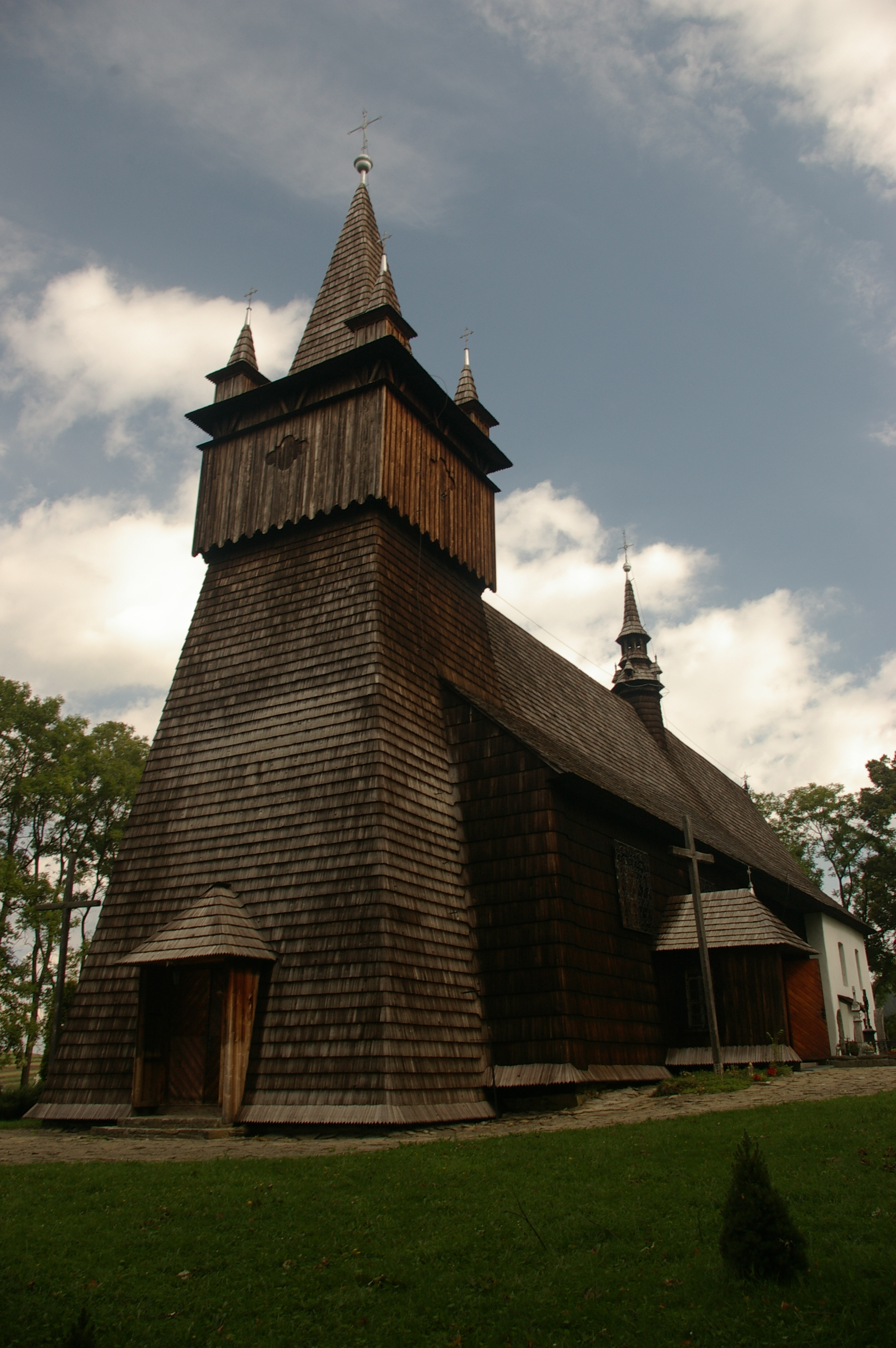
- Saint John the Baptist Church

- Location within Poland
- Coordinates: 49°30′32″N 19°43′1″E
- Country: Poland
- Voivodeship: Lesser Poland
- County: Nowy Targ
- Gmina: Jabłonka
- Time zone: UTC+1 (CET)
  - Summer (DST): UTC+2 (CEST)
- Vehicle registration: KNT

Orawka [ɔˈrafka] (Hungarian: Kisárva) is a village in the administrative district of Gmina Jabłonka, within Nowy Targ County, Lesser Poland Voivodeship, in southern Poland, close to the border with Slovakia.

The village lies in the drainage basin of the Black Sea (through Orava, Váh and Danube rivers), in the historical region of Orava (Polish: Orawa). The local landmark is the Saint John the Baptist church, listed as a Historic Monument of Poland.

== History ==
The area belonged to Great Moravia in the 9th century. In the 10th or early 11th century it became part of Poland, and later it passed to Hungary. In 1880, Orawka had a population of 680. It became again part of Poland following World War I.
