= Bukowina-Osiedle =

- Village
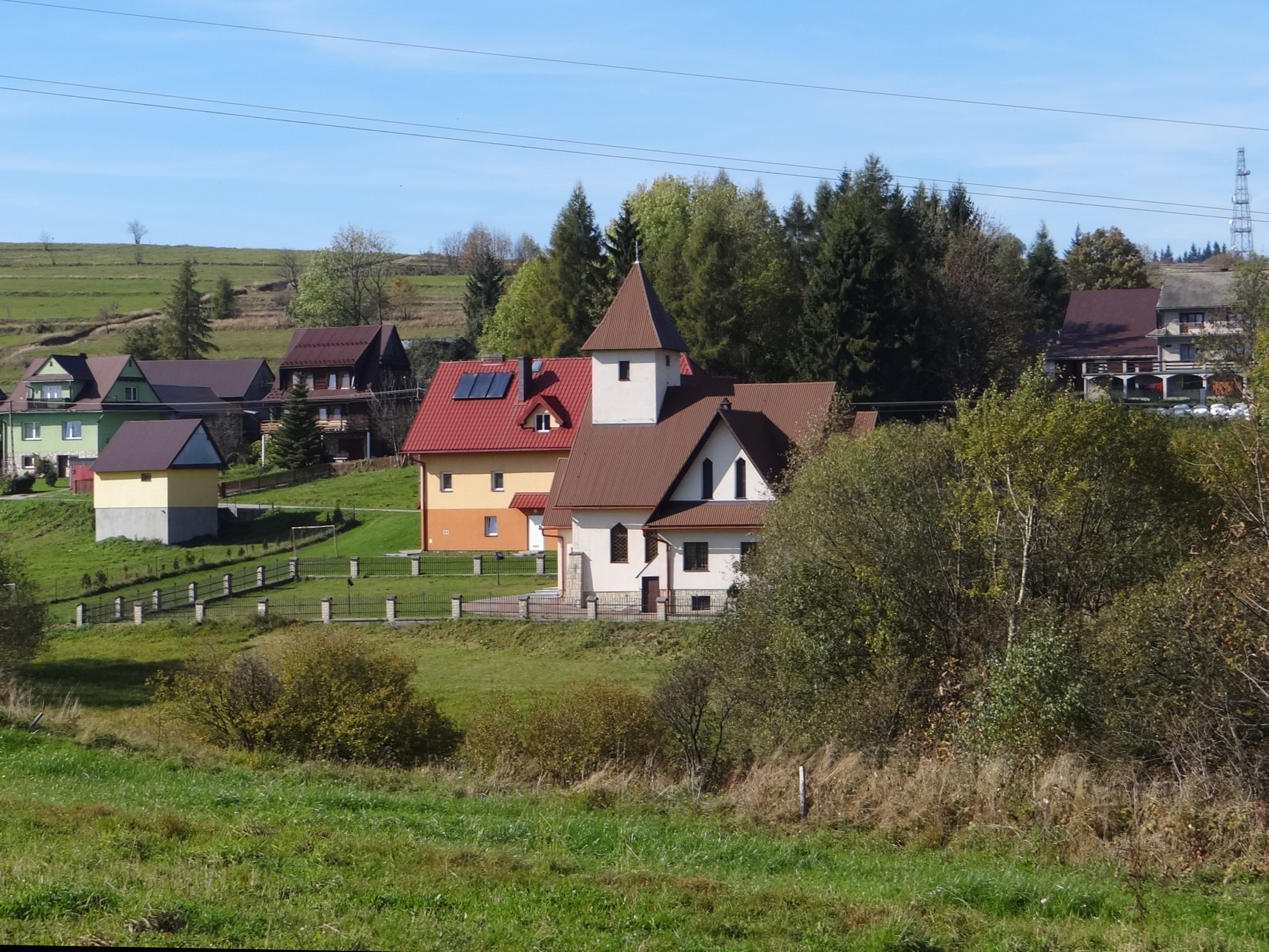

- Location within Poland
- Coordinates: 49°31′14″N 19°50′41″E
- Country: Poland
- Voivodeship: Lesser Poland
- County: Nowy Targ
- Gmina: Raba Wyżna
- Population: 210
- Time zone: UTC+1 (CET)
  - Summer (DST): UTC+2 (CEST)
- Vehicle registration: KNT

Bukowina-Osiedle [bukɔˈvina ɔˈɕɛdlɛ] is a village in the administrative district of Gmina Raba Wyżna, within Nowy Targ County, Lesser Poland Voivodeship, in southern Poland.

The village lies in the drainage basin of the Black Sea (through Orava, Váh and Danube rivers), in the historical region of Orava (Polish: Orawa).

== History ==
The area became part of Poland in the 10th or early 11th century, and later it passed to Hungary. In the late 19th century, 878 Poles lived in the village. It became again part of Poland following World War I. During World War II, from 1939 to 1945, it was occupied by the Slovak Republic.
