= Podsarnie =

- Village
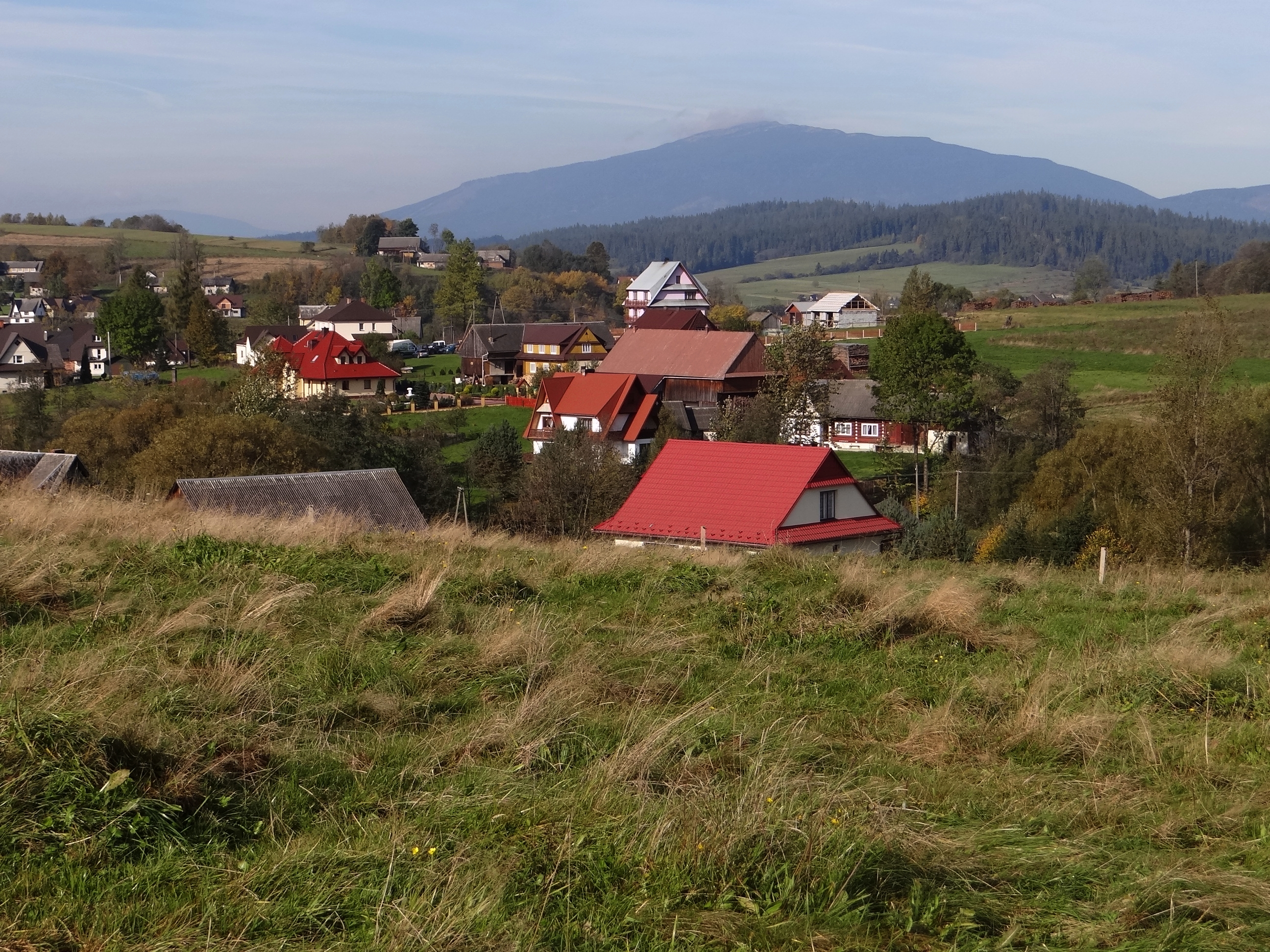
- General view

- Location within Poland
- Coordinates: 49°34′N 19°48′E
- Country: Poland
- Voivodeship: Lesser Poland
- County: Nowy Targ
- Gmina: Raba Wyżna
- Population: 803
- Time zone: UTC+1 (CET)
  - Summer (DST): UTC+2 (CEST)
- Postal code: 34-721
- Area code: 18
- Vehicle registration: KNT

Podsarnie [pɔtˈsarɲɛ] is a village in the administrative district of Gmina Raba Wyżna, within Nowy Targ County, Lesser Poland Voivodeship, in southern Poland.

The village lies in the drainage basin of the Black Sea (through Orava, Váh and Danube rivers), in the historical region of Orava (Polish: Orawa).

== History ==
The area became part of Poland in the 10th or early 11th century, and later it passed to Hungary. In 1880, Podsarnie, also known in the past as Sarnia, had a population of 487, entirely Polish by nationality. It became again part of Poland following World War I.

The local primary school is the first school in Poland to be named after Lech Kaczyński and Maria Kaczyńska, presidential couple that perished in the Smolensk air disaster on 10 April 2010.
