= Our Lady of the Holy Rosary Parish (Rochester, New Hampshire) =

Our Lady of the Holy Rosary
- Our Lady of the Holy Rosary
- 43.306579°N 70.984864°W
- Location: 189 N Main St; Rochester, NH
- Country: United States
- Denomination: Roman Catholic

Administration
- Diocese: Diocese of Manchester

Clergy
- Bishop: Peter Anthony Libasci
- Pastor(s): Very Rev. Fr. Patrick N. Gilbert, V.F.

Our Lady of the Holy Rosary is a Catholic church in Rochester, New Hampshire, United States. It is part of the Roman Catholic Diocese of Manchester. The church is located at 189 North Main Street in Rochester.

== History ==
=== 19th century ===
In the early 1880s, the "Societe Saint Jean-Baptiste" (founded October 22, 1879) began a campaign to secure the services of a resident, French-speaking priest for the 60-plus French-Canadian families of the area. In 1883, Bishop James A. Healy of the Portland Diocese appointed Rev. Urbain Lamy as the first pastor of "Notre Dame Du Tres Saint Rosaire" (Our Lady of the Most Holy Rosary). The first Sunday Mass was celebrated in the McDuffee Block on March 22, 1883. A Bridge Street site was chosen for the church building, and construction was completed in time for Christmas Day Mass. Father Lamy guided the parish in purchasing land for the cemetery, in building the first school in 1888, and in building the first rectory in 1893.

=== 20th century ===
Rev. Cyrille Joseph Paradis, pastor from 1900 to 1908, organized the "Societe des Dames de Ste-Anne", a social service group that is still active. In 1913, Rev. Charles Salyme Lacroix founded St. Charles Orphanage at the junction of South Main Street and Grant Street. The Grey Nuns of St. Hyacinthe first staffed the home, which is now sponsored by New Hampshire Catholic Charities as the St. Charles Children's Home.

In 1939, a new Holy Rosary Elementary School was constructed during the pastorate of Rev. Joseph Henri Cormier. Holy Rosary High School was built in 1957 under the direction of Rev. Andre Brunelle, pastor from 1950 to 1961. In 1961 Rev. Gilles Simard arrived in Rochester, and under his guidance the Holy Rosary Credit Union was established. In 1963 the rectory was moved to the renovated Snow property at 189 North Main Street, the current location. Within the year, new church plans were underway.

The Most Reverend Ernest J. Primeau, Bishop of Manchester, officiated at the dedication of the new church facility at 189 North Main, on September 15, 1963. In accordance with the Second Vatican Council directives, the sanctuary was renovated in 1977. In 1981 the Babe Ruth Baseball League established Msgr. Gilles Simard Park on an unused parcel of cemetery land.

Rev. Paul D. Montminy was assigned to Our Lady of the Holy Rosary in 1989. Under his leadership, the administrative offices adjoining the rectory were constructed in 1994, the Holy Rosary Cemetery was landscaped and enlarged in 1995, and a new parish center was built in the year 2000.

=== 21st century ===
In July 2007, the Rev. Paul Gousse was assigned as pastor of Our Lady of the Holy Rosary and soon afterwards established a perpetual adoration chapel.

In September 2019, Fr. Adrian Frackowiak was assigned as the Parochial Vicar for Our Lady of the Holy Rosary and St. Leo Parish. It was his first priestly assignment; he hails from Poland.

In 2020 thanks to the efforts of Father Adrian Frackowiak the parish received a first class relic of Pope John Paul II from Cardinal Stanisław Dziwisz.

On July 13, 2022, Reverend Matthew J. Schultz – has been assigned pastor

In 2022 both Fr. Gousse, and Fr. Frackowiak were reassigned. Very Rev. Fr. Patrick N. Gilbert, V.F. has been assigned pastor. Fr. Gilbert is also the Dean of the Seacoast Denery.
