= Danielki =

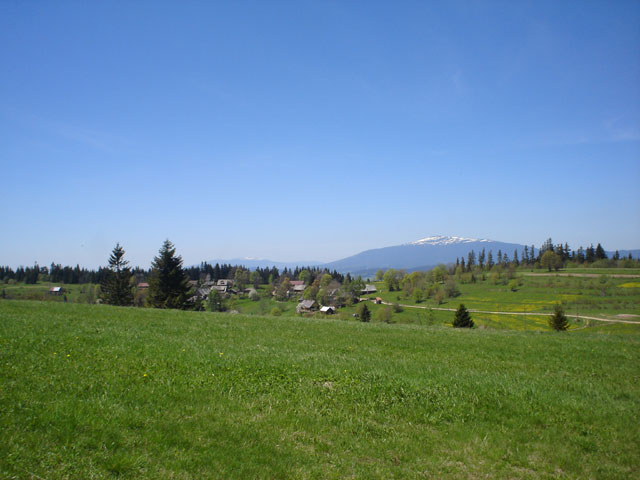
- Danielki from a distance

- Location within Poland
- Coordinates: 49°31′14″N 19°45′4″E
- Country: Poland
- Voivodeship: Lesser Poland
- County: Nowy Targ
- Gmina: Jabłonka
- Elevation: 850 m (2,790 ft)

Population
  - Total: 9
- Time zone: UTC+1 (CET)
  - Summer (DST): UTC+2 (CEST)
- Postal code: 34-722
- Area code: +48 18
- Car plates: KNT

Danielki [daˈɲɛlki] is a small village situated in southern Poland, in the administrative district of Gmina Jabłonka, within Nowy Targ County, Lesser Poland Voivodeship, close to the border crossing at Chyżne.

According to the population census made in 2000, the village is inhabited by only 9 people. Its population used to be close to extinction due to harsh weather and climate conditions. In 1949 the settlement burned down, later it was rebuilt, with most houses built again of wood. Recently it has become a popular destination for celebrities to buy a summer cottage.
