= Chyżne =

- Village
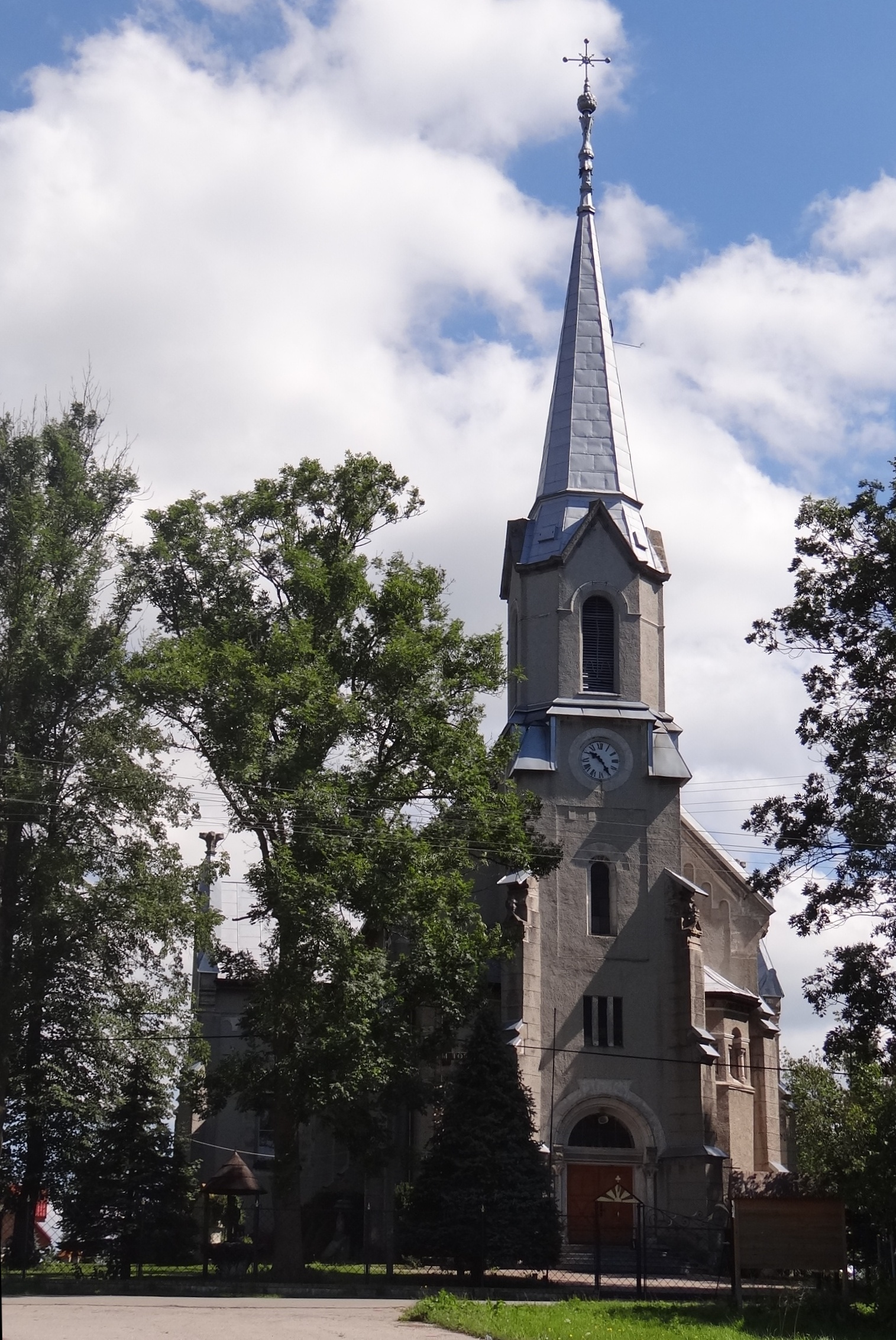
- Saint Anne church

- Location within Poland
- Coordinates: 49°26′N 19°40′E
- Country: Poland
- Voivodeship: Lesser Poland
- County: Nowy Targ
- Gmina: Jabłonka
- Population: 1,200
- Time zone: UTC+1 (CET)
  - Summer (DST): UTC+2 (CEST)
- Vehicle registration: KNT

Chyżne [ˈxɨʐnɛ] (Hungarian: Hizsnye) is a village in the administrative district of Gmina Jabłonka, within Nowy Targ County, Lesser Poland Voivodeship, in southern Poland, close to the border with Slovakia.

The village lies in the drainage basin of the Black Sea (through Orava, Váh and Danube rivers), in the historical region of Orava (Polish: Orawa).

== History ==
The area became part of Poland in the 10th or early 11th century, and later it passed to Hungary. In the late 19th century, Chyżne had a population of 1,728, with 86.9% of Poles. It became again part of Poland following World War I.
