= Sieniawa, Lesser Poland Voivodeship =

Sieniawa
- Village
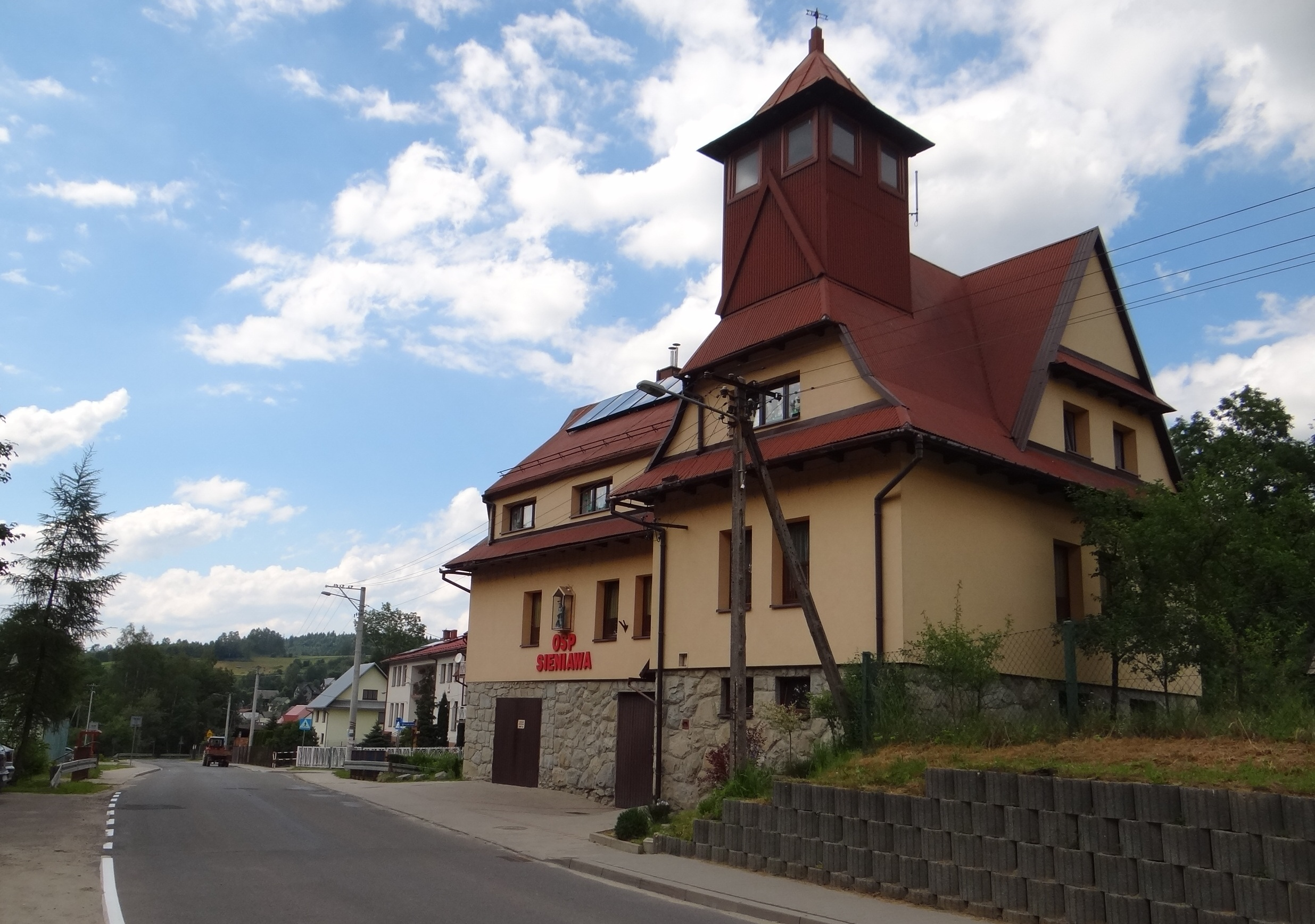
- Sieniawa fire station

- Location within Poland
- Coordinates: 49°32′N 19°56′E
- Country: Poland
- Voivodeship: Lesser Poland
- County: Nowy Targ
- Gmina: Raba Wyżna
- Population: 1,800

Sieniawa (Polish pronunciation: [ɕɛˈɲava]) is a village in the administrative district of Gmina Raba Wyżna, within Nowy Targ County, Lesser Poland Voivodeship, in southern Poland.

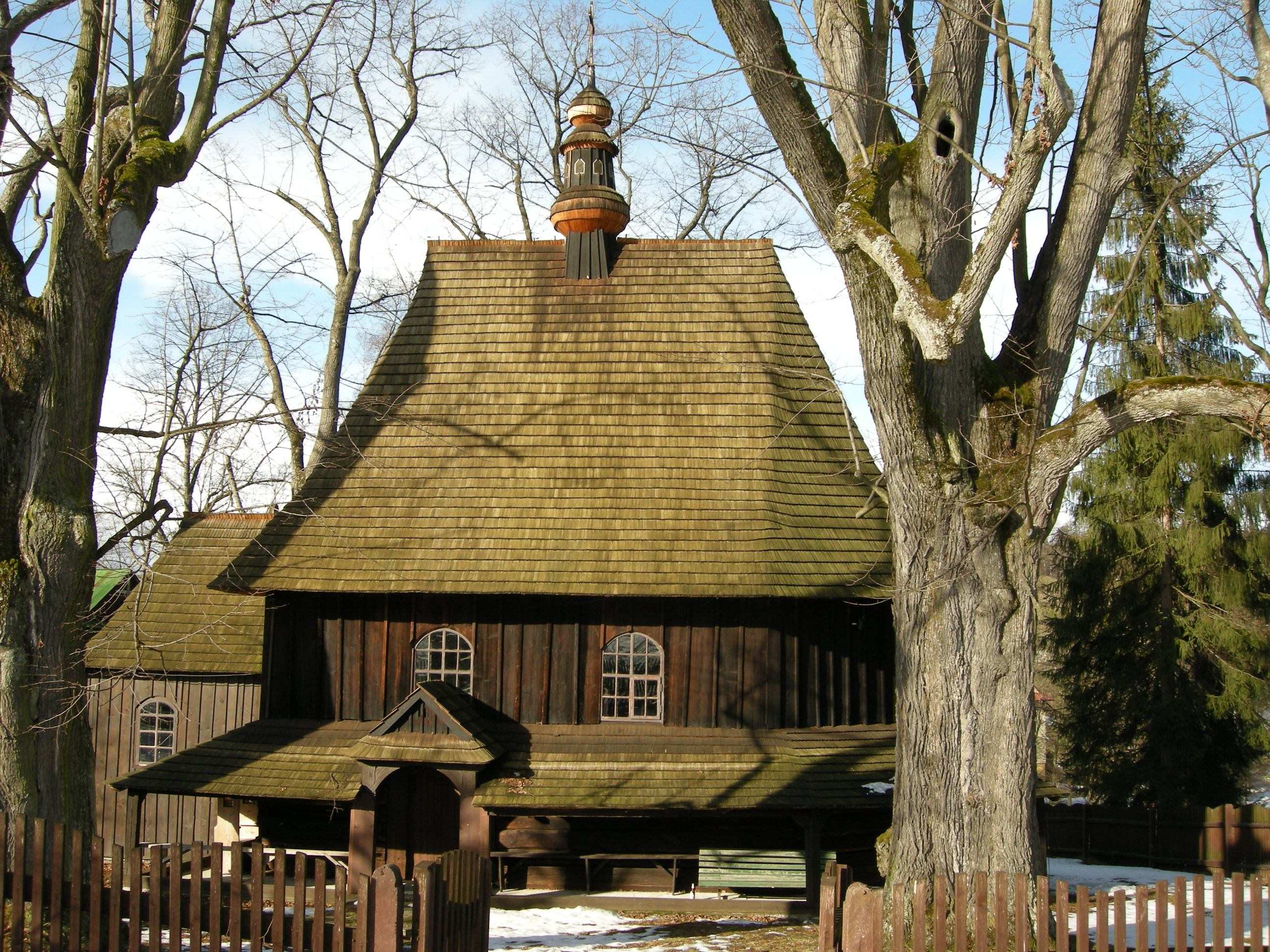
Saint Anthony of Padua church in Sieniawa
