= Gmina Raba Wyżna =

Gmina Raba Wyżna Raba Wyżna Commune
- Gmina
- Coat of arms
- Interactive map of Gmina Raba Wyżna
- Coordinates (Raba Wyżna): 49°34′N 19°54′E
- Country: Poland
- Voivodeship: Lesser Poland
- County: Nowy Targ
- Seat: Raba Wyżna

Area
  - Total: 88.28 km^{2} (34.09 sq mi)

Population (2006)
  - Total: 13,525
  - Density: 153.2/km^{2} (396.8/sq mi)
- Website: https://www.rabawyzna.pl

Gmina Raba Wyżna is a rural gmina (administrative district) in Nowy Targ County, Lesser Poland Voivodeship, in southern Poland. Its seat is the village of Raba Wyżna, which lies approximately 14 kilometres (9 mi) north-west of Nowy Targ and 55 km (34 mi) south of the regional capital Kraków.

The gmina covers an area of 88.28 square kilometres (34.1 sq mi), and as of 2006 its total population is 13,525.

== Villages ==
Gmina Raba Wyżna contains the villages and settlements of Bielanka, Bukowina-Osiedle, Harkabuz, Podsarnie, Raba Wyżna, Rokiciny Podhalańskie, Sieniawa and Skawa.

== Neighbouring gminas ==
Gmina Raba Wyżna is bordered by the town of Jordanów and by the gminas of Czarny Dunajec, Jabłonka, Jordanów, Lubień, Nowy Targ, Rabka-Zdrój and Spytkowice.
