= Kraľovany =

- Municipality
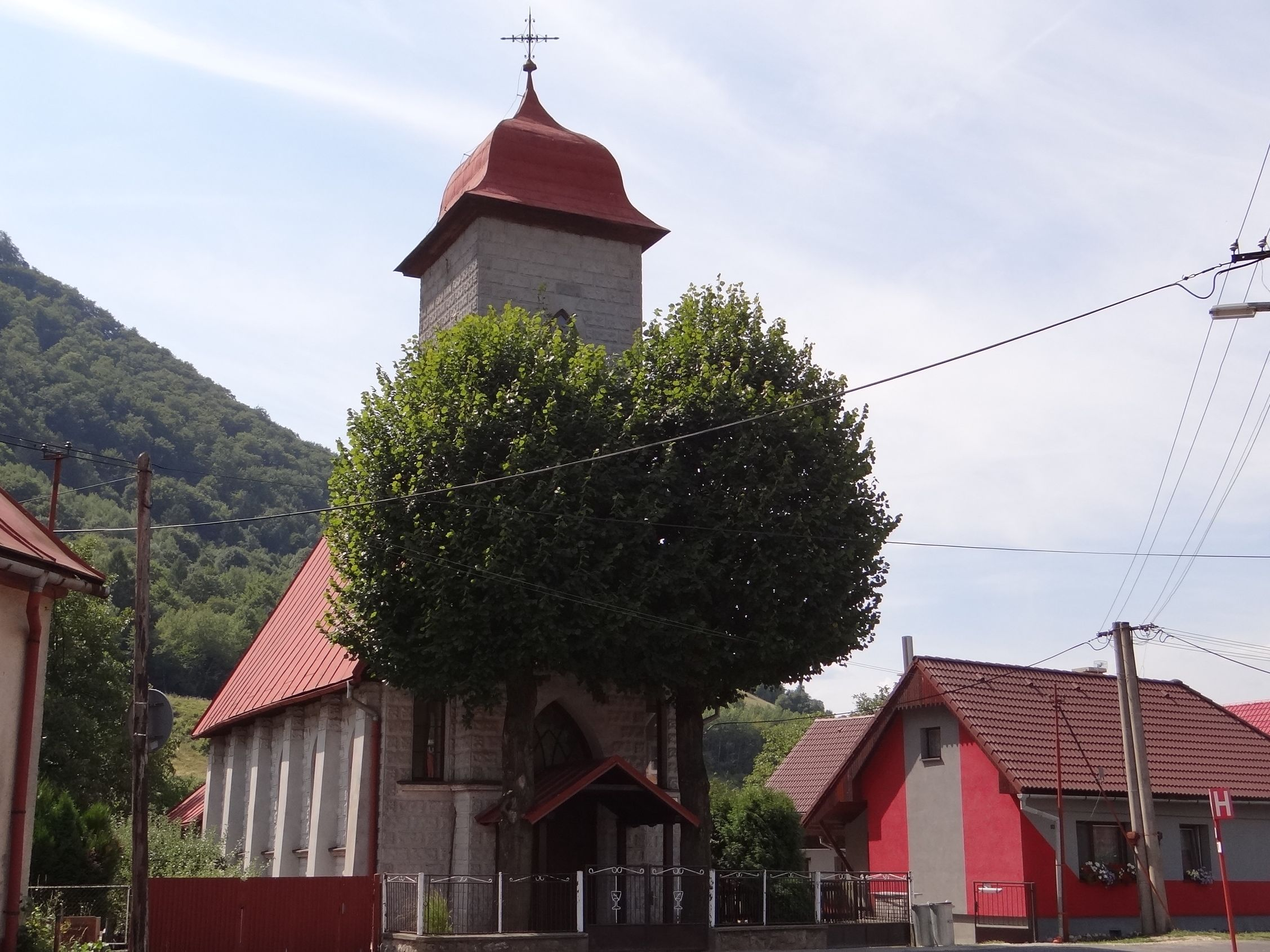

- Flag

- Location of Kraľovany in the Žilina Region Location of Kraľovany in Slovakia
- Coordinates: 49.15°N 19.13°E
- Country: Slovakia
- Region: Žilina Region
- District: Dolný Kubín District
- First mentioned: 1365

Area
  - Total: 18.80 km^{2} (7.26 sq mi)
- Elevation: 430 m (1,410 ft)

Population (2025)
  - Total: 424
- Time zone: UTC+1 (CET)
  - Summer (DST): UTC+2 (CEST)
- Postal code: 275 1
- Area code: +421 43
- Vehicle registration plate (until 2022): DK
- Website: www.obeckralovany.sk

Kraľovany (Hungarian: Kralován) is a village and municipality in Dolný Kubín District in the Žilina Region of northern Slovakia. It lies at the confluence of the Orava and Váh rivers.

== Geography ==
The municipality lies at an altitude of 430 metres (1,410 ft) and covers an area of 18.80 km^{2} (7.26 sq mi) (2025).

== History ==
Before the establishment of independent Czechoslovakia in 1918, Kraľovany was part of Árva County within the Kingdom of Hungary. From 1939 to 1945, it was part of the Slovak Republic.

== Population ==
Population statistic (10 years)
Year	1995	2005	2015	2025
Count	484	459	442	424
Difference		−5.16%	−3.70%	−4.07%

Population statistic
Year	2024	2025
Count	430	424
Difference		−1.39%

It has a population of 424 people (31 December 2025).

=== Ethnicity ===
Census 2021 (1+ %)
Ethnicity	Number	Fraction
Slovak	425	98.83%
Total	430	

In year 2021 was 430 people by ethnicity 425 as Slovak, 3 as Russian, 2 as Not found out, 1 as Czech and 1 as Polish.

Note on population: The difference values of population numbers in the table "Population statistic" and in the sections "Ethnicity" & "Religion" is caused by the use of various statistical methods.

=== Religion ===
Census 2021 (1+ %)
Religion	Number	Fraction
Evangelical Church	219	50.93%
Roman Catholic Church	149	34.65%
None	42	9.77%
Greek Catholic Church	6	1.4%
Total	430	

In year 2021 was 430 people by religion 219 from Evangelical Church, 149 from Roman Catholic Church, 42 from None, 6 from Greek Catholic Church, 3 from Eastern Orthodox Church, 3 from Not found out, 3 from Ad hoc movements, 2 from Christian Congregations in Slovakia, 1 from Calvinist Church, 1 from Buddhism and 1 from Apostolic Church.
