= Raba Wyżna =

- Village
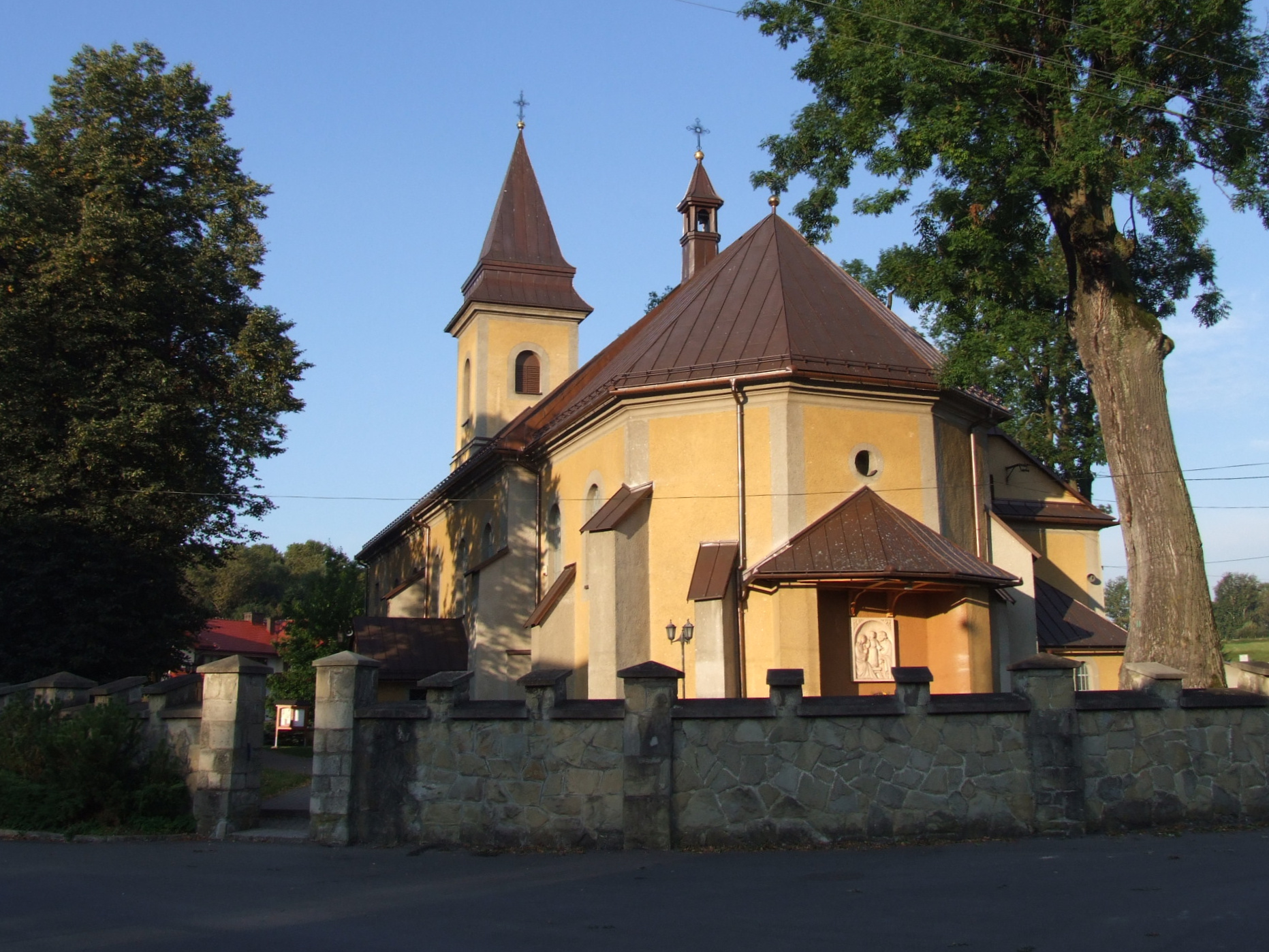
- Local Catholic church

- Coat of arms

- Location within Poland
- Coordinates: 49°34′N 19°54′E
- Country: Poland
- Voivodeship: Lesser Poland
- County: Nowy Targ
- Gmina: Raba Wyżna
- Population: 4,116
- Postal code: 34-721
- Area code: +48 18

Raba Wyżna is a village in Poland, situated in Lesser Poland Voivodeship, Nowy Targ County. It is a seat of Raba Wyżna Commune. As of 2006, the village had 4116 inhabitants. Raba Wyżna is also the birthplace of Stanisław Dziwisz, trusted secretary to Pope John Paul II.

== History ==
=== 1500s–1800s ===
Settlement began at what is now Raba Wyżna in the 1550s. According to local records, in the year 1581 the village consisted of 43 farms.

The first church in Raba Wyżna was a small wooden church called the church of St. Stanisław Bishop and Martyr, a Catholic church built in 1581. Though the Raba Wyżna church was initially part of the Rabka parish, by 1618 Raba Wyżna became its own parish. In 1668 a new church was built in the village and was consecrated by Bishop Mikołaj Oborski of Kraków.

In 1846-1847 the village and surrounding areas suffered a typhus outbreak and a great famine due to crop failure. Over 1/3 of the village inhabitants died. According to the 1847 record books, in Raba Wyżna alone 455 people died, and 877 remained alive in the parish. In the nearby village of Spytkowice 511 people died that same year. The number of corpses overwhelmed the church, and a new cemetery was built out of necessity in September 1847.

In that year 1847, for lack of food, people starved to death, touched by the hand of the Just God, no doubt for their transgressions. Wherever on the road, in the bushes, at the backyard, you could see a man who died of hunger. In the local parish, a third of the parishioners starved to death. For so many dead, the cemetery was no longer sufficient to bury their corpses, so another place was chosen for the cemetery outside the village, in the Piekarczykówka field, which was decorated with a wooden cross and the image of Jesus Christ crucified on a sheet, and was decorated by the Reverend X. Marcin Leśniak, Dean Makowski. On September 21, 1847 it was consecrated.

— Fr. Gottfried Fitz, Parish Chronicle (1847)

=== First and Second World Wars ===
The first world war touched the village of Raba Wyzna, and the Austrian army pillaged the town and stole the church bell.

World War II brought more chaos to the village, causing some local inhabitants to leave their homes. On September 2, 1939 a battle between the Germans and Polish armies swept through the town, resulting in 40 homes being burnt to the ground and many civilians killed. The local church was plundered, books were burned, and the church bells were stolen by the German army. The day after the battle, a group of local men on their way to church were kidnapped by the German army and transported to the Mauthausen concentration camp in Austria. The German army occupied the town from 1939 until 1945. In 1942 the church was temporarily closed due to a dysentery outbreak in the town.

In 1945, the German occupation had ended and the rebuilding of the town began. In 1947 a new church bell were purchased, weighing 300 kg. In 1968 two more bells were purchased for the church, affectionately called "Stanislaw" and "Jozef."

== Sport ==
Badge of the football team Orkan Raba Wyżna

The village has its own amateur football team, Ludowy Klub Sportowy Orkan Raba Wyżna, commonly referred to as Orkan Raba Wyżna, founded in 1946. Run entirely by volunteers and financed by community support and voluntary donations, the club, which is affiliated to the Polish Football Association (PZPN), has about 100 active players, and competes in the Klasa Okręgowa Nowy Sącz II, the sixth tier of the Polish football league system.

The club plays its home matches at the village pitch (Stadion LKS Orkan), measuring 98m x 65m, which has been periodically modernized with the support of local authorities and EU-funded rural development initiatives. It holds a capacity of 1,000 people and has pitch lighting.
