= Jabłonka-Bory =

- Village
- Location within Poland
- Coordinates: 49°27′30″N 19°40′34″E
- Country: Poland
- Voivodeship: Lesser Poland
- County: Nowy Targ
- Gmina: Jabłonka

Jabłonka-Bory [jaˈbwɔnka ˈbɔrɨ] is a village in the administrative district of Gmina Jabłonka, within Nowy Targ County, Lesser Poland Voivodeship, in southern Poland, close to the border with Slovakia.
