= Gmina Jabłonka =

Gmina Jabłonka Jabłonka Commune
- Gmina
- Coat of arms
- Interactive map of Gmina Jabłonka
- Coordinates (Jabłonka): 49°28′48″N 19°41′36″E
- Country: Poland
- Voivodeship: Lesser Poland
- County: Nowy Targ
- Seat: Jabłonka

Area
  - Total: 213.28 km^{2} (82.35 sq mi)

Population (2006)
  - Total: 16,910
  - Density: 79.29/km^{2} (205.3/sq mi)
- Website: http://www.jablonka.ug.gov.pl/

Gmina Jabłonka is a rural gmina (administrative district) in Nowy Targ County, Lesser Poland Voivodeship, in southern Poland, on the Slovak border. Its seat is the village of Jabłonka, which lies approximately 24 kilometres (15 mi) west of Nowy Targ and 67 km (42 mi) south of the regional capital Kraków.

The gmina covers an area of 213.28 square kilometres (82.3 sq mi), and as of 2006 its total population is 16,910.

== Villages ==
Gmina Jabłonka contains the villages and settlements of Chyżne, Jabłonka, Jabłonka-Bory, Lipnica Mała, Orawka, Danielki, Podwilk, Zubrzyca Dolna and Zubrzyca Górna.

== Neighbouring gminas ==
Gmina Jabłonka is bordered by the gminas of Bystra-Sidzina, Czarny Dunajec, Lipnica Wielka, Raba Wyżna, Spytkowice and Zawoja. It also borders Slovakia.
