= Jabłonka, Lesser Poland Voivodeship =

Jabłonka
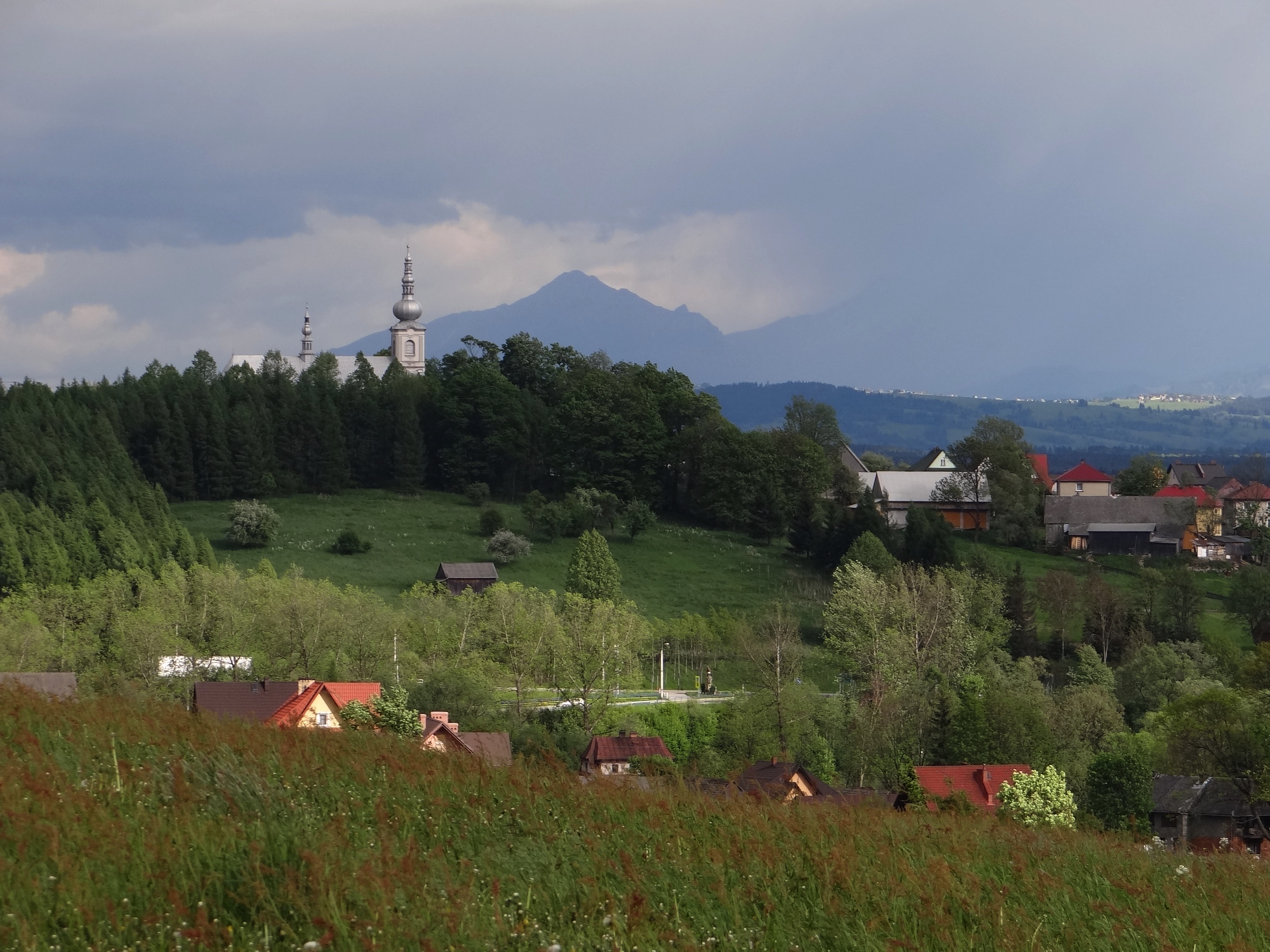
- Jabłonka

- Location within Poland
- Coordinates: 49°28′48″N 19°41′36″E
- Country: Poland
- Voivodeship: Lesser Poland
- County: Nowy Targ
- Gmina: Jabłonka
- Population: 5,400
- Time zone: UTC+1 (CET)
  - Summer (DST): UTC+2 (CEST)
- Vehicle registration: KNT

Jabłonka [jaˈbwɔnka] (Hungarian: Jablonka) is a village in Nowy Targ County, Lesser Poland Voivodeship, in southern Poland, close to the border with Slovakia. It is the seat of the gmina (administrative district) called Gmina Jabłonka.

The village lies in the drainage basin of the Black Sea (through Orava, Váh and Danube rivers), in the historical region of Orava (Polish: Orawa).

== History ==
The area became part of Poland in the 10th or early 11th century, and later it passed to Hungary. In the late 19th century, Jabłonka had a predominantly Polish population. It became again part of Poland following World War I.

== Notable people ==
- Andrzej Dziubek (born 1954), Polish musician and vocalist
