= Skawa, Nowy Targ County =

Skawa
- Village
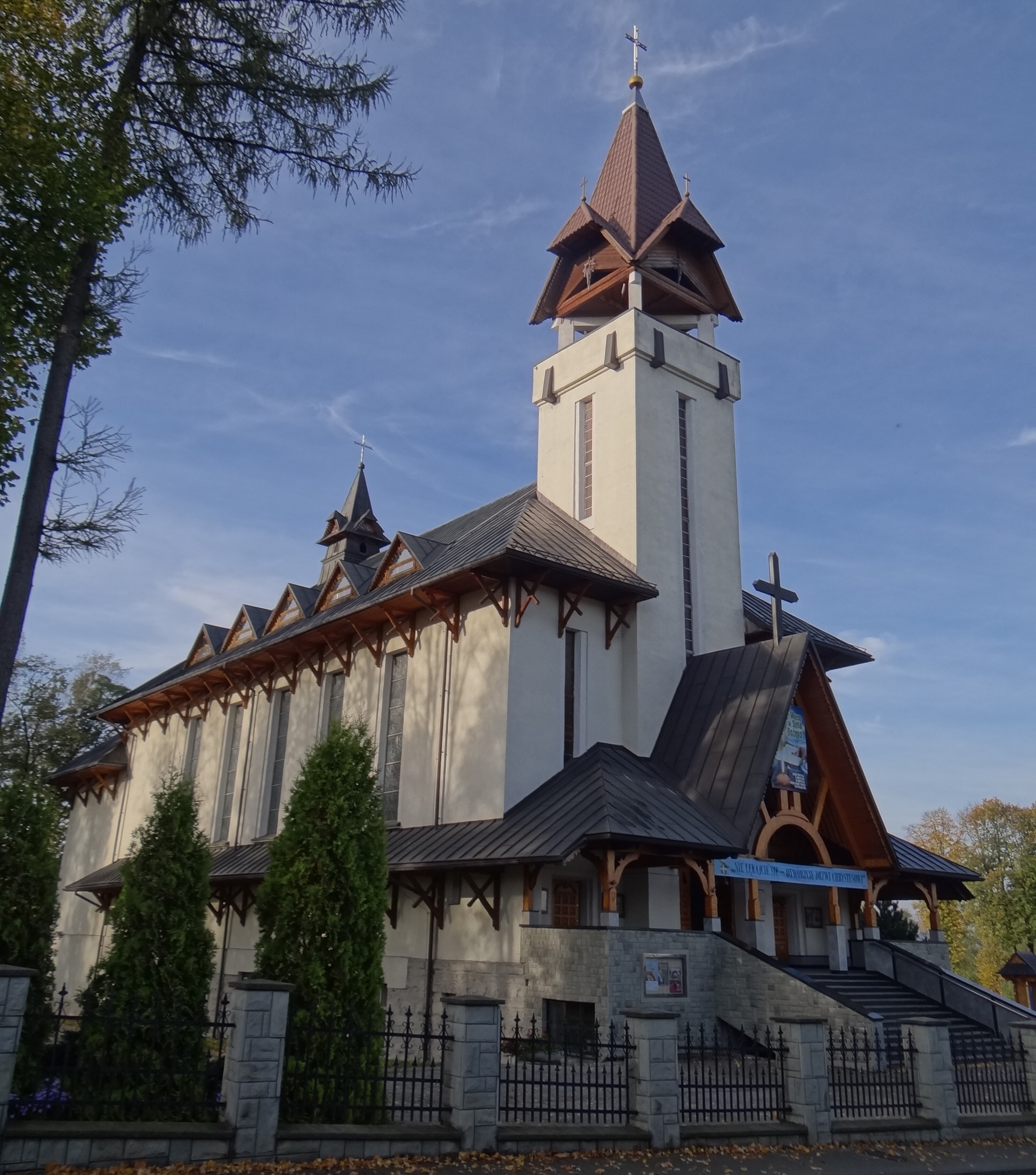
- Local Catholic church

- Location within Poland
- Coordinates: 49°37′N 19°54′E
- Country: Poland
- Voivodeship: Lesser Poland
- County: Nowy Targ
- Gmina: Raba Wyżna
- Area: 2,052 ha (5,070 acres)
- Lowest elevation: 450 m (1,480 ft)
- Population: 4,000
- Vehicle registration: KNT

Skawa [ˈskava] is a village on the Skawa river (hence its name), in the administrative district of Gmina Raba Wyżna, within Nowy Targ County, Lesser Poland Voivodeship, in southern Poland.
