= Rokiciny Podhalańskie =

- Village
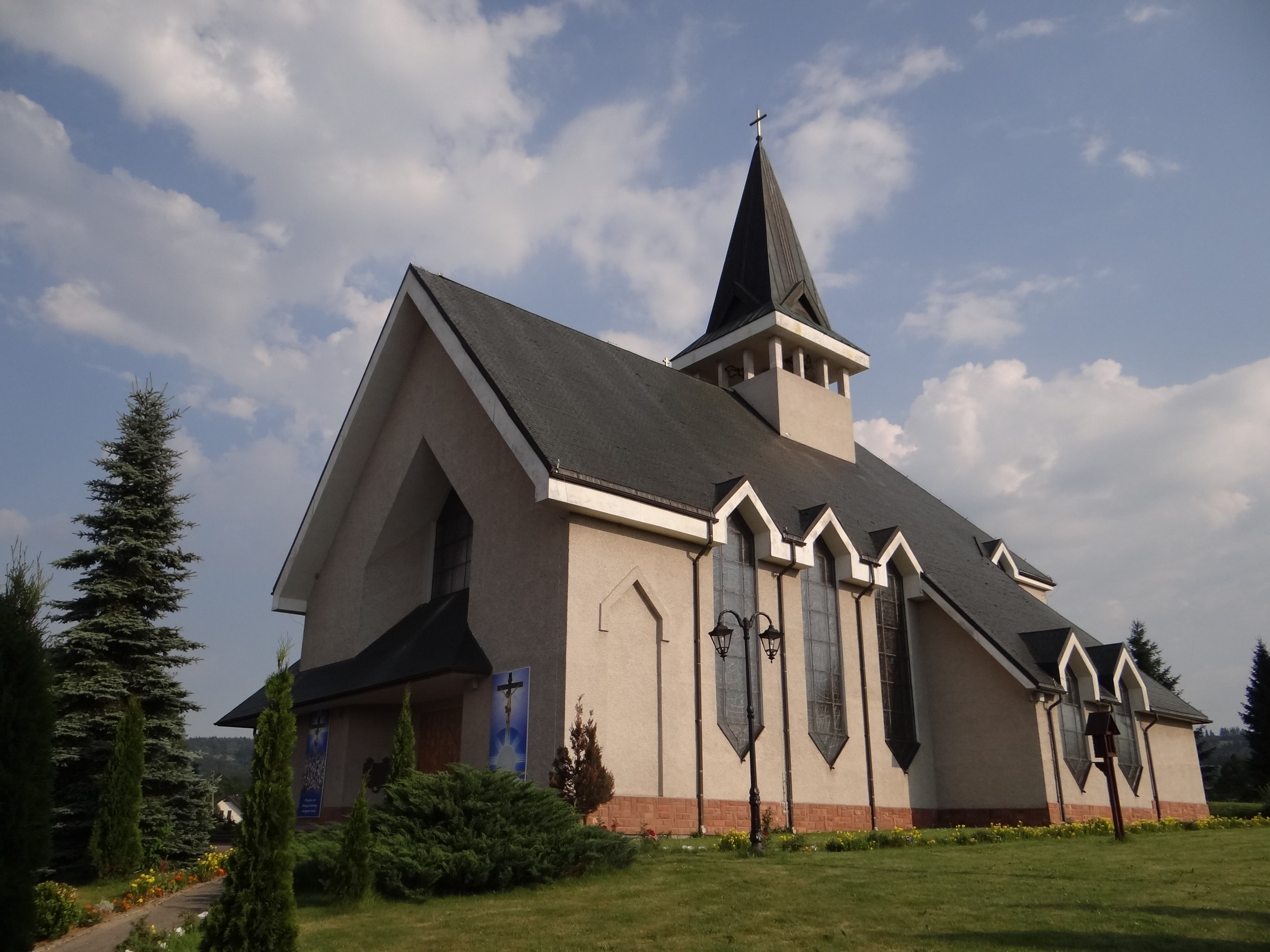
- Local Catholic church

- Location within Poland
- Coordinates: 49°34′N 19°55′E
- Country: Poland
- Voivodeship: Lesser Poland
- County: Nowy Targ
- Gmina: Raba Wyżna
- Population: 1,450

Rokiciny Podhalańskie [rɔkiˈt͡ɕinɨ pɔtxaˈlaɲskʲɛ] is a village in the administrative district of Gmina Raba Wyżna, within Nowy Targ County, Lesser Poland Voivodeship, in southern Poland.
