= Bielanka, Nowy Targ County =

Bielanka
- Village
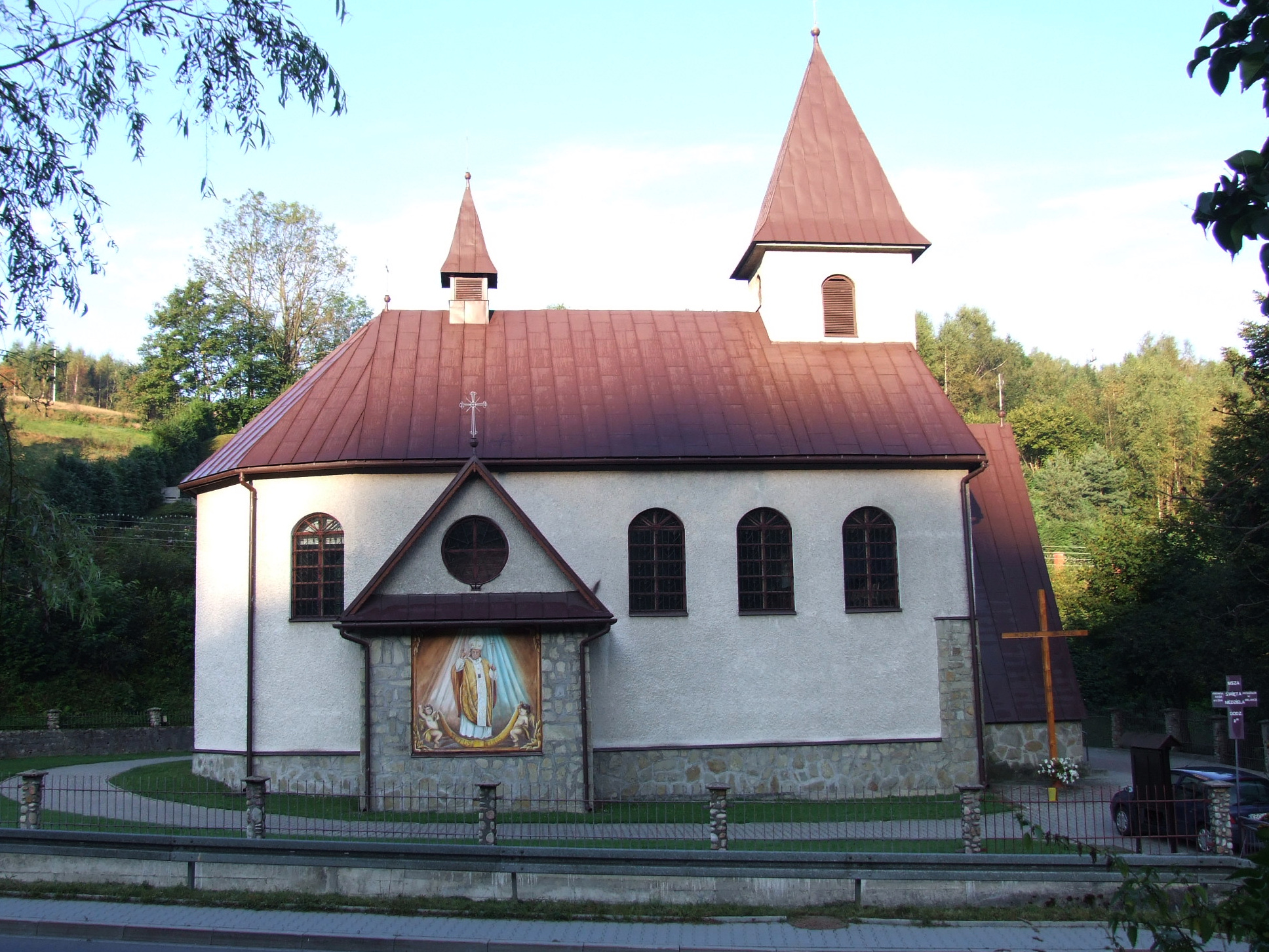
- Local Catholic church

- Location within Poland
- Coordinates: 49°31′29″N 19°53′17″E
- Country: Poland
- Voivodeship: Lesser Poland
- County: Nowy Targ
- Gmina: Raba Wyżna
- Website: http://www.bielanka.pl

Bielanka [bjɛˈlaŋka] is a village in the administrative district of Gmina Raba Wyżna, within Nowy Targ County, Lesser Poland Voivodeship, in southern Poland.
