= Franciszek Macharski =

Polish cardinal (1927–2016)

His Eminence Franciszek Macharski TOSD
- Cardinal, Archbishop Emeritus of Kraków
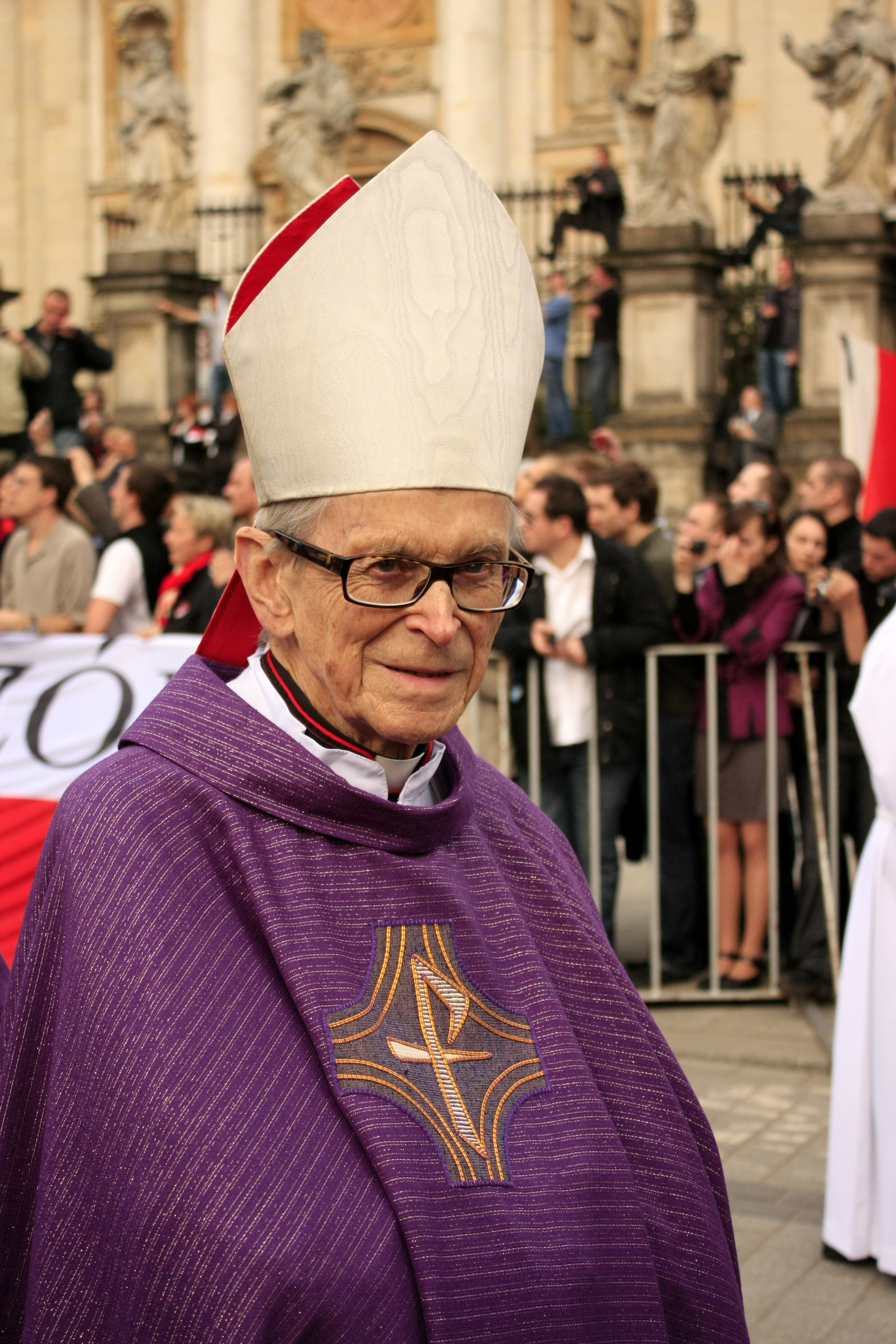
- Archbishop Emeritus, Franciszek Cardinal Macharski, at the funeral mass for Lech Kaczyński (2010)
- Archdiocese: Kraków
- See: Kraków
- Appointed: 29 December 1978
- Installed: 28 January 1979
- Term ended: 3 June 2005
- Predecessor: Karol Wojtyła
- Successor: Stanisław Dziwisz
- Other post: Cardinal-Priest of San Giovanni a Porta Latina

Orders
- Ordination: 2 April 1950 by Adam Stefan Sapieha
- Consecration: 6 January 1979 by Pope John Paul II
- Created cardinal: 30 June 1979 by Pope John Paul II
- Rank: Cardinal-Priest

Personal details
- Born: Franciszek Macharski; 20 May 1927 Kraków, Poland
- Died: 2 August 2016 (aged 89) Kraków, Poland
- Denomination: Roman Catholic
- Motto: Jesu in te confido (Jesus, I trust in you)
- Coat of arms

Franciszek Macharski (Polish pronunciation: [fraɲˈt͡ɕiʂɛk maˈxarskʲi]; 20 May 1927 – 2 August 2016) was a Polish cardinal of the Roman Catholic Church. He was appointed Archbishop of Kraków from 1978, named by Pope John Paul II to succeed him in that role. Macharski was elevated to the cardinalate in 1979, and resigned as archbishop in 2005.

== Early life ==
Franciszek Macharski was born on 20 May 1927 in Kraków, Poland. He was the youngest of four children. During World War II he worked as a menial laborer and afterward entered the seminary in Kraków, where he also studied theology. He was ordained as a priest in April 1950 by Cardinal Adam Stefan Sapieha. Until 1956 he was a vicar in a parish near Bielsko-Biała and was then transferred to Fribourg, Switzerland, to continue his theological studies. He received his doctorate in 1960.

== Vocation ==
Macharski was appointed Archbishop of Kraków in December 1978 by Pope John Paul II, who had been archbishop of that city himself until his election to the papacy in October 1978. Macharski was consecrated as a bishop by John Paul II himself at the Vatican on 6 January 1979 and took possession of the Archdiocese of Kraków on 28 January 1979, when he was installed at Wawel Cathedral.

Archbishop Macharski was created Cardinal-Priest of San Giovanni a Porta Latina as his titular church in June 1979, the first consistory of John Paul II, just six months after his episcopal consecration. He was a member of the cardinal electors of the 2005 papal conclave that elected Joseph Alois Ratzinger as Pope Benedict XVI. He lost the right to vote in conclaves when he turned 80 in May 2007.

Macharski retired as Archbishop of Kraków on 3 June 2005. His successor was Pope John Paul II's private secretary, Stanisław Dziwisz.

== Death ==
Cardinal Macharski fell down the stairs of his home in June 2016. Pope Francis visited Macharski in a Kraków hospital on 28 July 2016, while Macharski was in a coma. He died five days later.

Catholic Church titles
Preceded by Karol Wojtyła (Pope John Paul II)	Archbishop of Kraków; 29 December 1978 – 3 June 2005	Succeeded by Stanisław Dziwisz
Preceded by Josef Frings	Cardinal-Priest of San Giovanni a Porta Latina; 30 June 1979 – 2 August 2016	Succeeded by Renato Corti
