= Stanisław Dziwisz =

Polish cardinal of the Catholic Church

His Eminence Stanisław Dziwisz
- Cardinal, Metropolitan Archbishop Emeritus of Kraków
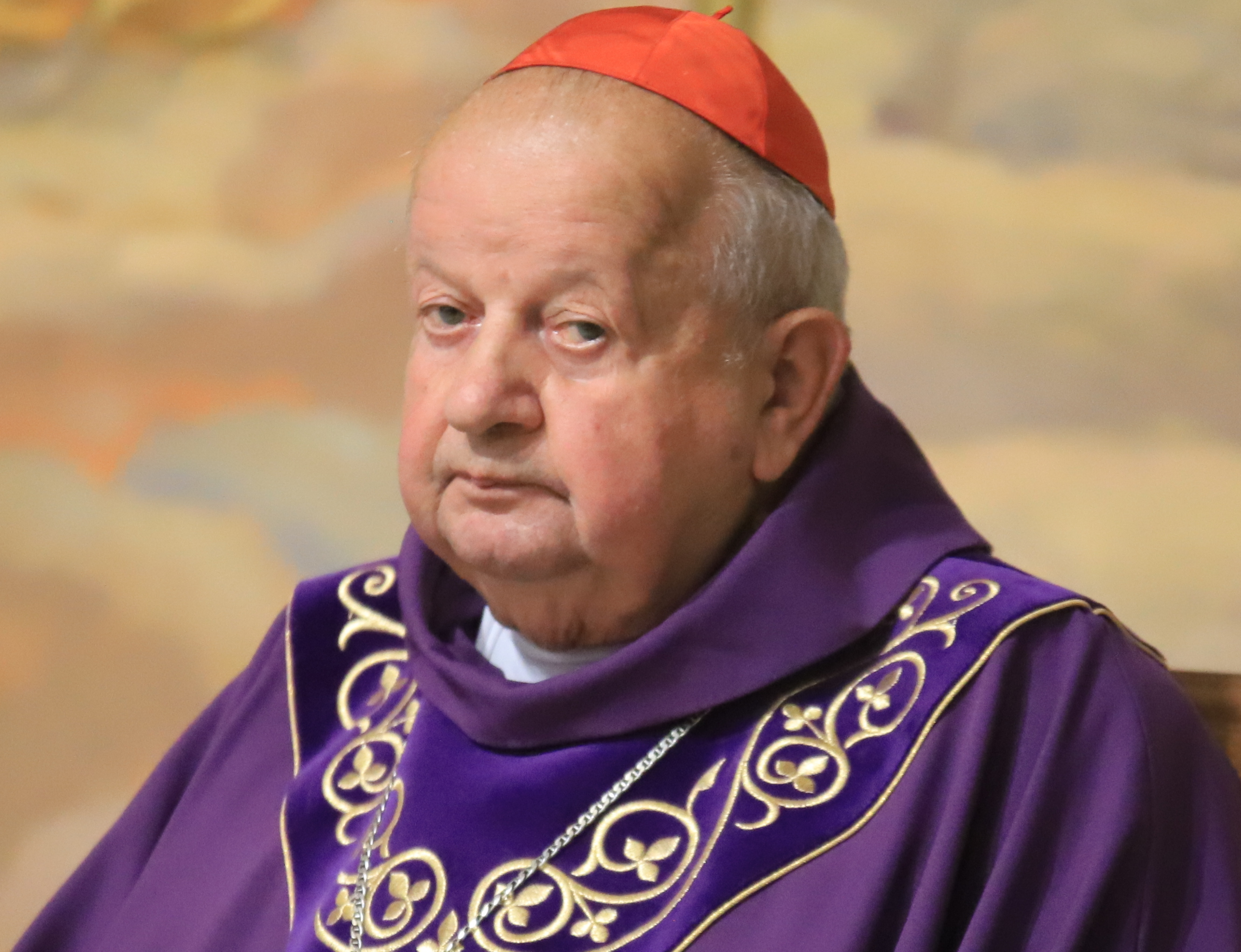
- Stanisław Dziwisz (2018)
- Archdiocese: Kraków
- See: Kraków
- Appointed: 3 June 2005
- Installed: 27 August 2005
- Term ended: 8 December 2016
- Predecessor: Franciszek Macharski
- Successor: Marek Jędraszewski
- Other post: Cardinal-Priest of Santa Maria del Popolo (2006-)
- Previous posts: Titular Archbishop of San Leone (1998–2005); Adjunct Prefect of the Prefecture of the Papal Household (1998–2005)

Orders
- Ordination: 23 June 1963 by Bishop Karol Wojtyła
- Consecration: 19 March 1998 by Pope John Paul II
- Created cardinal: 24 March 2006 by Pope Benedict XVI
- Rank: Cardinal-Priest

Personal details
- Born: Stanisław Dziwisz; 27 April 1939 (age 87) Raba Wyżna, Poland
- Denomination: Catholic Church
- Motto: Sursum corda ("Lift up your hearts")
- Coat of arms

Stanisław Jan Dziwisz (Polish pronunciation: [staˈɲiswav ˈdʑiviʂ]; born 27 April 1939) is a Polish Catholic prelate who served as Metropolitan Archbishop of Kraków from 2005 to 2016. He was created a cardinal in 2006. He was a long-time and influential aide to Pope John Paul II, a friend of Pope Benedict XVI, and an ardent supporter of John Paul II's beatification.

== Early life, ordination, and priesthood ==
Stanisław Jan Dziwisz was born in the village of Raba Wyżna to Stanisław Dziwisz, a railroad worker, and his wife, Zofia Bielarczyk. The fifth of seven children, he has four brothers and two sisters. During World War II, the family hid a Jewish man in their house. When the younger Stanisław was only nine, his father died after being struck by a train while crossing the railroad tracks. He attended the classical Secondary School (Liceum) in Nowy Targ, passing the exam of maturity in 1957.

Dziwisz then entered the Major Seminary of Kraków, where he completed his studies in philosophy and theology. On 23 June 1963, he was ordained to the priesthood for the Archdiocese of Kraków by its auxiliary bishop, Bishop Karol Wojtyła. His first assignment was as a curate at a parish in Maków Podhalański, where he served for two years. He then continued his studies at the Faculty of Theology of Kraków, specializing in liturgy and earning a Licentiate of Sacred Theology in 1967. In October 1966, he was appointed by Archbishop Wojtyła, who had been elevated to Archbishop of Kraków, to serve as his personal secretary. Dziwisz remained in this position until Wojtyła's death in 2005.

In addition to his duties as personal secretary, Dziwisz served as professor of liturgy at the Superior Catechetical Institute in Kraków, editor of the official newspaper of the archdiocesan curia, member and secretary of the Archdiocesan Liturgical Commission, and a member of the Presbyteral Council. He also participated in the work of the Committee for the Holy Year (1974–1975) and of the Pastoral Synod of Kraków (1972–1978).

Dziwisz accompanied Wojtyła to the papal conclave of August 1978, which elected Pope John Paul I. Following the death of John Paul I thirty-three days later, he and Wojtyła returned for the next conclave, which elected Wojtyła as Pope John Paul II. Dziwisz was appointed his principal private secretary and served in that capacity throughout John Paul's 27-year pontificate.

In 1981 he earned a Doctor of Sacred Theology degree from the Faculty of Theology of Kraków, with a thesis entitled "The Cult of Saint Stanislaus, Bishop of Kraków, until the Council of Trent".

Dziwisz was appointed titular bishop of San Leone and joint head of the Prefecture of the Papal Household on 7 February 1998. He was consecrated a bishop on 19 March of that year by Pope John Paul II with co-consecrators Cardinal Secretary of State Angelo Cardinal Sodano and Cardinal-Archbishop of Kraków Franciszek Cardinal Macharski. John Paul elevated Dziwisz to the rank of archbishop on 29 September 2003.

In 2004, Dziwisz appeared to be the source of a quote from John Paul endorsing the film The Passion of the Christ, which required clarification from Vatican officials because the pope never makes such endorsements.

== Death of John Paul II ==
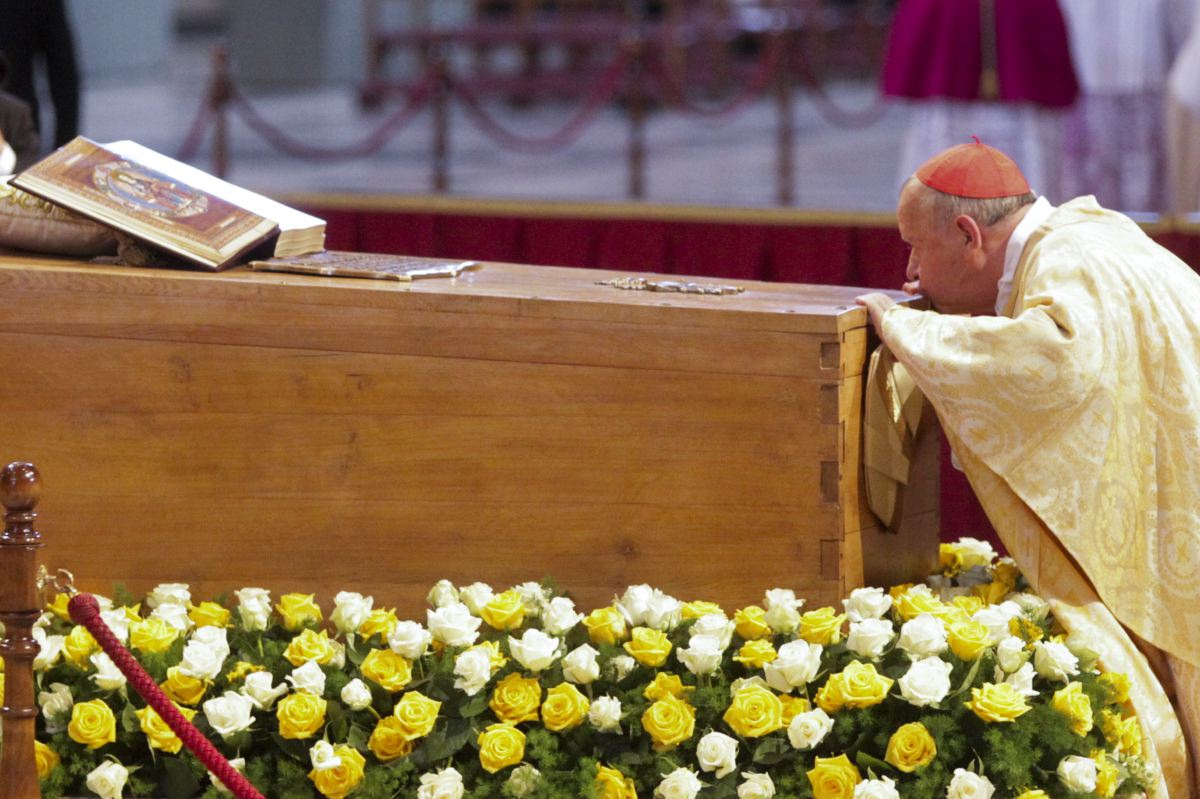
Cardinal Dziwisz kisses the casket of John Paul II at the beatification Mass on 1 May 2011.

As the Vatican denied the pope's health was getting worse, the Roman newspaper Il Messaggero reported that Dziwisz had told a priest, "Pray for the pope, because he's getting worse." On 31 March 2005 Dziwisz administered the Anointing of the Sick to him. Before the death of John Paul II, Dziwisz was reported to have helped him write a message to his staff not to grieve, that he (John Paul) was happy and that they should be too. In 2013, Dziwisz said that Pope John Paul II had not resigned because of his failing health because he believed "you cannot come down from the cross".

When John Paul died on 2 April 2005, Dziwisz was at his bedside. According to rules created by John Paul, Dziwisz packed his belongings and vacated the papal apartments before they were sealed by the Camerlengo. During the Requiem Mass for John Paul on 8 April, Dziwisz had the honour of placing a white silk veil over the face of the Pope before the body was lowered into three separate caskets. It was his last act of service as papal secretary. He was one of the few people Pope John Paul mentioned in his will, writing: "and I thank him for his help and collaboration, so understanding for so many years".

== Metropolitan Archbishop of Krakow and cardinal ==
On 3 June 2005 Benedict XVI appointed Dziwisz to succeed Cardinal Macharski as Metropolitan Archbishop of Kraków.

Styles of Stanisław Dziwisz
- Reference style: His Eminence
- Spoken style: Your Eminence
- Informal style: Cardinal
- See: Kraków

At the consistory of 24 March 2006 Dziwisz was raised to the rank of cardinal, becoming Cardinal-Priest of Santa Maria del Popolo. Dziwisz had earlier been mentioned as the possible cardinal created in pectore by John Paul II in 2003, but the identity of that person remained unknown at John Paul's death.

On 6 May 2006 Pope Benedict named Dziwisz to be a member of the Congregation for Catholic Education and the Pontifical Council for Social Communications.

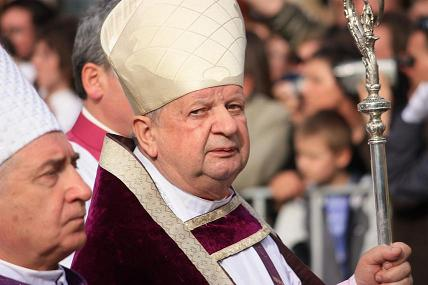
Cardinal Dziwisz, 2010

On 26 May 2010, Dziwisz was awarded the Cardinal Bea Interfaith Award of the Anti-Defamation League. Abraham Foxman, its president, said: "Cardinal Dziwisz is a valued friend to the Jewish people and someone I know I can trust and turn to in moments of tension or controversy." Dziwisz replied:

As the Bishop of Krakow, I would like to assure all of you that the Catholic Church in Poland wants to follow the example of Pope John Paul II, and courageously uncover and reject everything which makes the life of the Polish Catholics depart from the Gospel. For this reason, we note with shame that despite the unambiguous teachings of recent Popes on the appropriate attitudes of Catholics to Jews, many among us have not been able to overcome prejudices, inveterate resentments and harmful stereotypes.

In 2012 Dziwisz, as part of a broader trip, visited parishes with a significant Polish presence in the Archdiocese of Newark, New Jersey, in the United States.

Dziwisz participated in the papal conclave in March 2013 that elected Pope Francis.

On 8 December 2016, Pope Francis accepted Dziwisz' resignation as Archbishop of Kraków and named Marek Jędraszewski, Archbishop of Łódź, to succeed him. On 27 April 2019 Dziwisz reached 80 years of age and became ineligible to vote in a papal conclave.

== Maciel and Groër involvement ==
Dziwisz supported Marcial Maciel of Mexico, the founder of the Legion of Christ and the Regnum Christi movement. Author Jason Berry wrote that Maciel spent years cultivating Vatican support by funneling money to the Vatican. Under Maciel, the Legion of Christ steered streams of money through Dziwisz to the pope and the Vatican, sums that were designated for use in relation to the pope's private Masses in the Apostolic Palace. Late in Maciel's life, he was revealed to have abused boys and fathered up to six children, two of whom he allegedly abused, with at least two women.

Dziwisz was instrumental in blocking an investigation into allegations of child abuse against the late Benedictine cardinal Hans Hermann Groër, Archbishop of Vienna. Groër, who died in 2003, presided over the influential Austrian episcopal conference. He always denied wrongdoing and was praised by Pope John Paul II as a faithful servant. The bishops of Austria, however, were of a different opinion. On the occasion of their ad limina visit to Rome in 1998, they informed the Pope that they, as a college of bishops, had reached moral certainty that the allegations against Groër had a basis in truth.

== Post-retirement ==
In November 2020, Polish news channel TVN24 aired a documentary alleging that while Dziwisz was archbishop he failed to investigate allegations of sex abuse. A Vatican investigation by Cardinal Angelo Bagnasco cleared Dziwisz of wrongdoing in 2022.

== Writings ==
- A Life with Karol, Doubleday, 2008. ISBN 978-0-385-52374-5.

Catholic Church titles
Preceded by Diego Lorenzi	Private Secretary to the Pope; 16 October 1978 – 2 April 2005	Succeeded by Georg Gänswein
New title	Adjunct Prefect of the Prefecture of the Papal Household; 7 February 1998 – 3 June 2005	Position disestablished
Preceded by Jacques Maurice Faivre	— TITULAR — Archbishop of San Leone; 29 September 2003 – 3 June 2005	Succeeded by Víctor Manuel Ochoa Cadavid
Preceded by Franciszek Macharski	Archbishop of Kraków; 3 June 2005 – 8 December 2016	Succeeded by Marek Jędraszewski
Preceded by Hyacinthe Thiandoum	Cardinal-Priest of Santa Maria del Popolo; 24 March 2006 – present	Incumbent
