= Orava (region) =

Historical region in Slovakia and Poland

Coordinates: 49°15′42″N 19°21′29″E

Orava Orava, Orawa
- Historical region
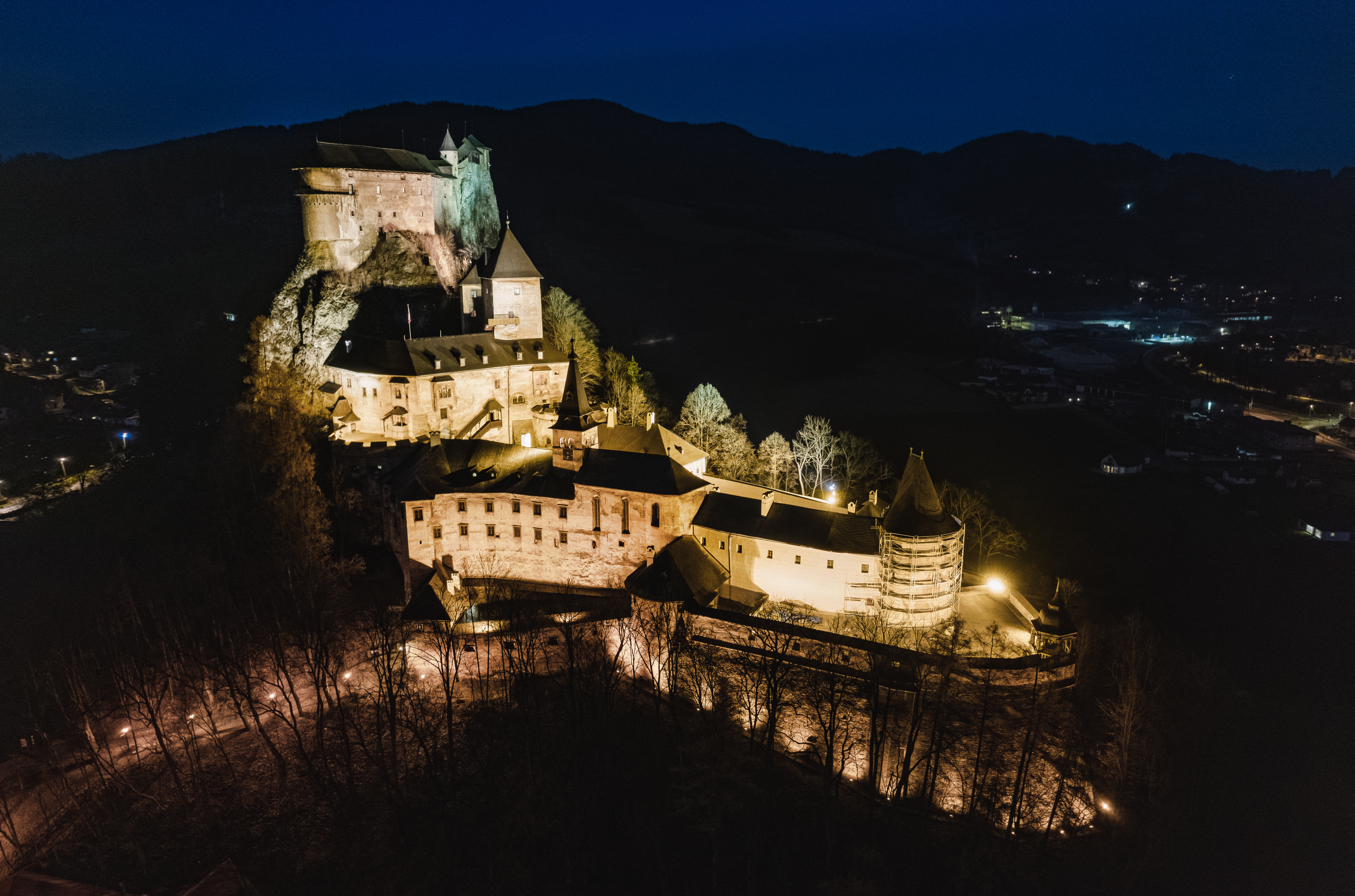
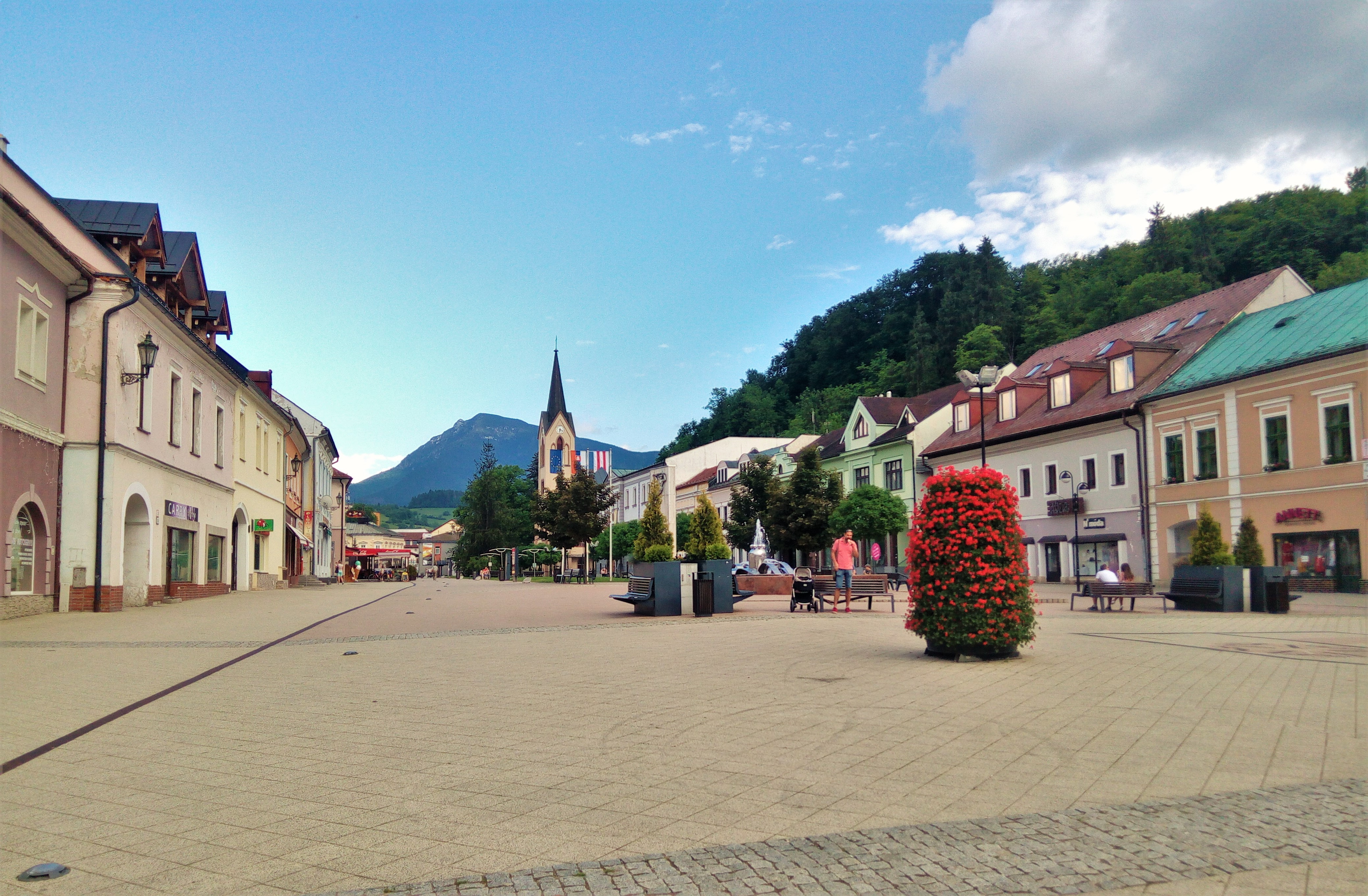
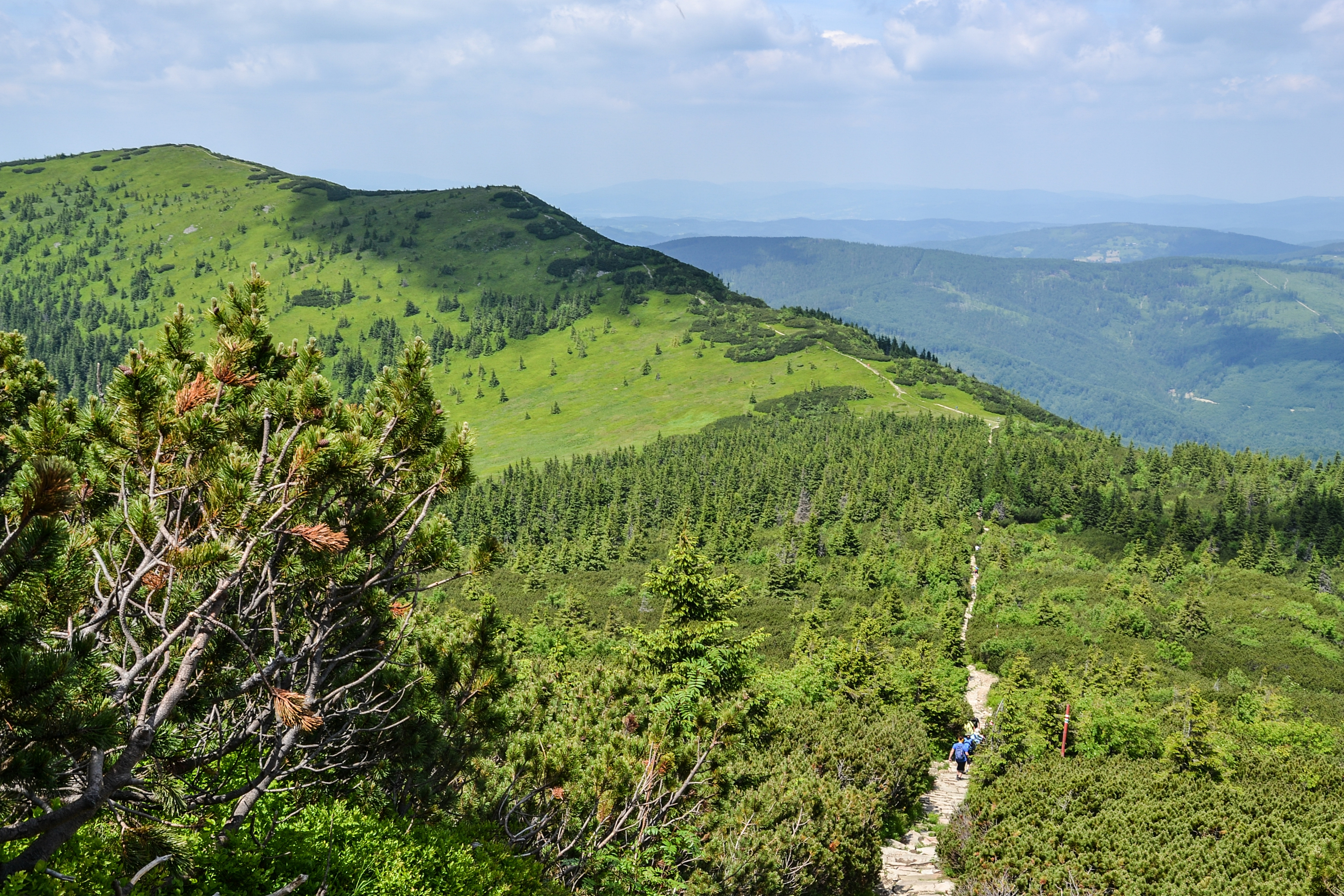
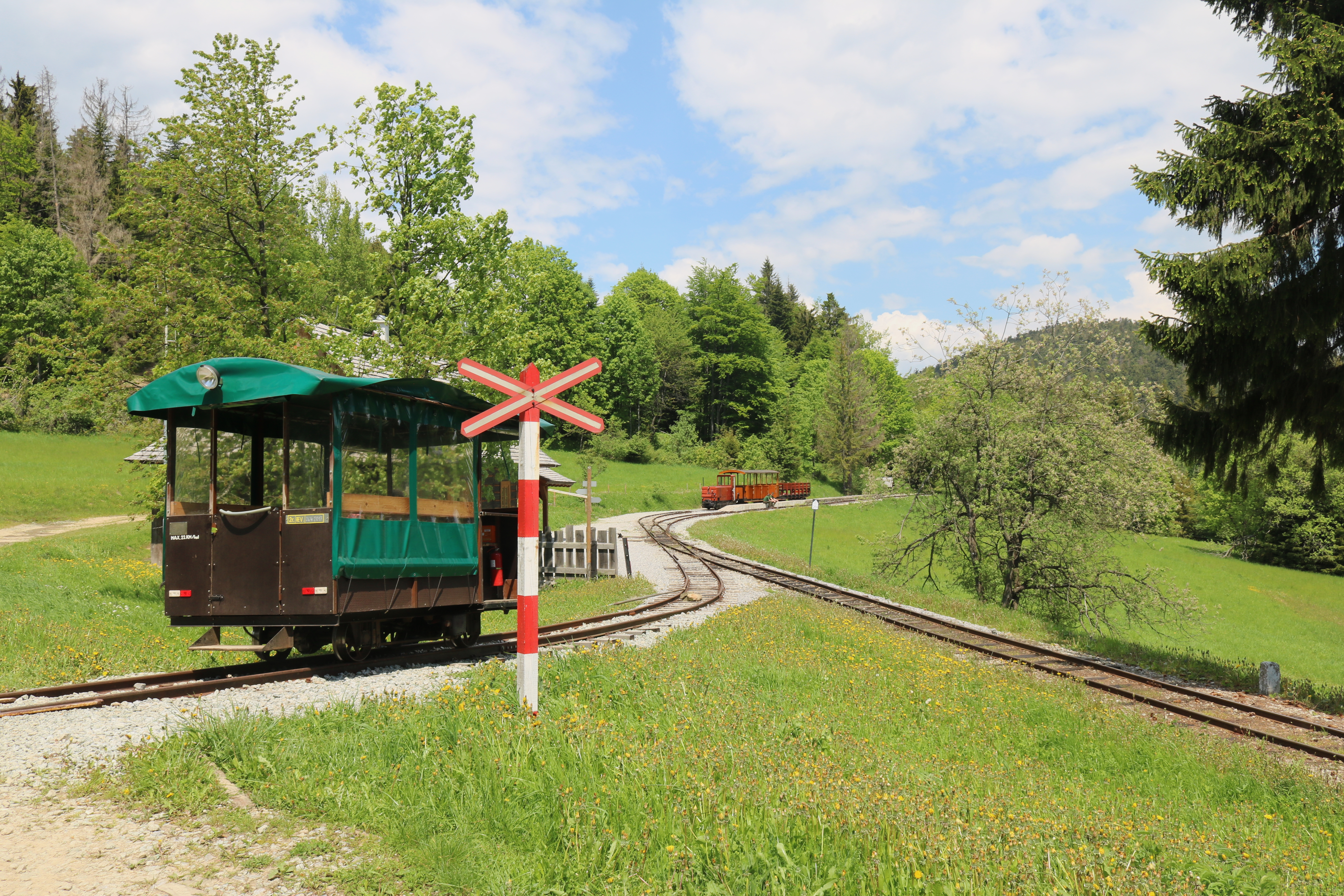
- From top, left to right: Orava Castle; Dolný Kubín; Mała Babia Góra; Orava Logging Railway

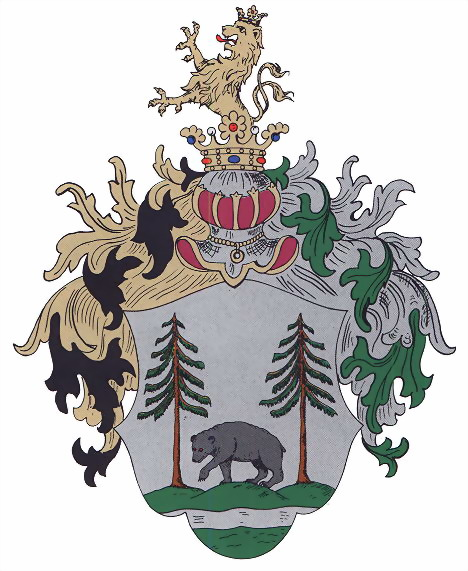
- Coat of arms

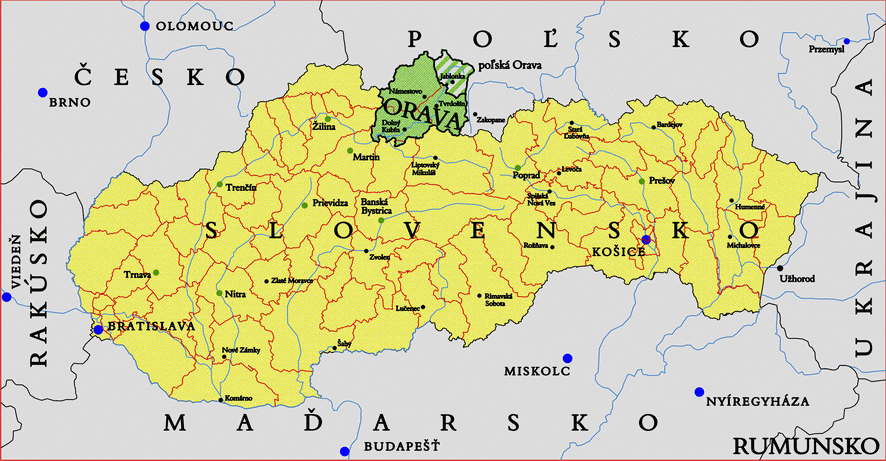
- Orava on the map of Slovakia
- Country: Slovakia; Poland
- Largest town: Dolný Kubín
- Time zone: UTC+1 (CET)
  - Summer (DST): UTC+2 (CEST)

Orava is the traditional name of a region situated in northern Slovakia (as Orava) and partially also in southern Poland (as Orawa). It encompasses the territory of the former comitatus (county) of Árva of Kingdom of Hungary. The northern part of Orava is one of the regions of the Goral Lands.

== Etymology ==
The name arises from the Orava river (a major river flowing through the region).

== History ==
The county arose before the 15th century. The county's territory was situated along the Orava River between Zázrivá and the Tatra Mountains. Its area amounted to 2,019 km^{2} (780 sq mi) around 1910. The original seat of the county was Orava Castle.

== Geography ==
Orava is recognized as one of Slovakia's 25 tourist regions, but not an administrative region. In Slovakia, it is divided between Dolný Kubín, Tvrdošín, and Námestovo districts in the Žilina Region. It has an area of 1,661 km^{2} (641 sq mi), with the population on the Slovak side around 126,000. The village of Oravská Polhora is the northernmost settlement of Slovakia. The most important town on the Slovak side (and also the seat of the former county) is Dolný Kubín. The Polish part of Orava belongs to the Lesser Poland Voivodeship, to the Nowy Targ County, with the main village of the Polish side being Jabłonka.

== Notable places ==
=== Slovakia ===
==== Orava castle ====
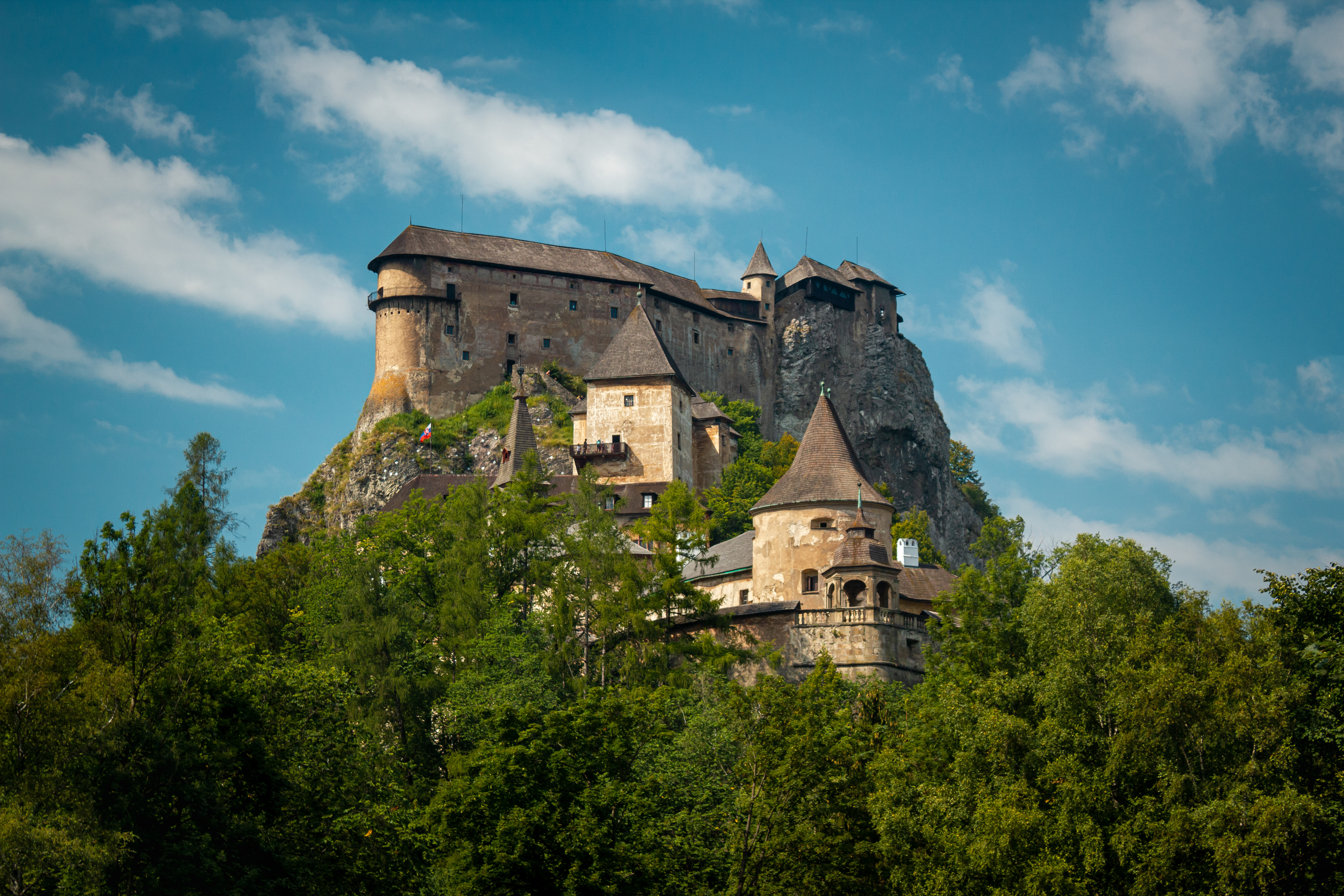
The castle in 2020.

Orava Castle is a castle situated on a high rock above Orava river in the village of Oravský Podzámok, Slovakia. The castle was built in the Kingdom of Hungary, with the oldest parts being built in the thirteenth century and the most recent parts in the early seventeenth century. Many scenes of the 1922 film Nosferatu were filmed here, the castle representing Count Orlok's Transylvanian castle.

=== Poland ===
==== Babia Góra ====
Babia Góra is a massif situated on the border between Poland and Slovakia in the Western Beskid Mountains. The name is also applied to the culmination of the massif, Diablak ("Devil's Peak"), which is also the highest peak of this part of the Carpathian Mountains, at 1,725 metres (5,659 ft) above sea level.

== Towns ==
- Dolný Kubín
- Námestovo
- Trstená
- Tvrdošín
