= Orava (river) =

Orava Hungarian: Árva, German: Arwa, Polish: Orawa
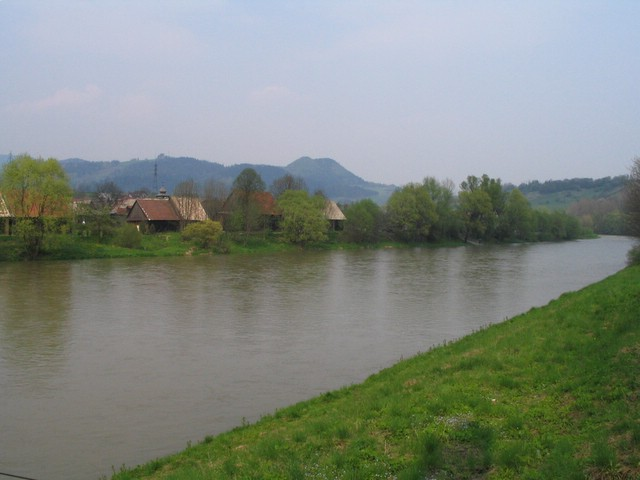
- Orava at Dolný Kubín, showing houses of Záskalie neighbourhood

Location
- Country: Slovakia

Physical characteristics
- Source: Orava reservoir, taking water from White Orava in Slovakia and from Black Orava in Poland
  - location: Orava, Slovakia
  - coordinates: 49°23′N 19°33′E
  - elevation: 601 m (1,972 ft)
- Mouth: Váh river
  - location: Kraľovany
  - coordinates: 49°09′N 19°09′E
  - elevation: 430.7 m (1,413 ft)
- Length: 62.0 km (38.5 mi)
- Basin size: 1,991.8 km^{2} (769.0 sq mi)
- Discharge
  - location: mouth
  - average: 34.5 m^{3}/s (1,220 cu ft/s)
  - minimum: 2.3 m^{3}/s (81 cu ft/s)
  - maximum: 1,120 m^{3}/s (40,000 cu ft/s)

Basin features
- Progression: Váh→ Danube→ Black Sea

The Orava (Hungarian: Árva) is a river in north-western Slovakia passing through a picturesque country, in the Orava county. Its source is nowadays the Orava water reservoir whose waters flooded the confluence of Biela (White) Orava and Čierna (Black) Orava in 1953. It flows into the river Váh near the village of Kraľovany. It is 62.0 km (38.5 mi) long and its basin size is 1,192 km^{2} (460 sq mi).

== Etymology ==
The name "Orava" may be of Pre-Slavic or Slavic origin. Pre-Slavic *er-/*or-: fast, swift (swift river). Proto-Slavic *or-, *orati: to scream, to roar. Slovak rivers Revúca and Hučava have the same etymology (a roaring river). The similar names from other Slavic countries are e.g. the Croatian river Orljava (1234 Orauua), the Ukrainian river and the village Oriava or Orzawiec (in the river system of Dnieper). The suffix -ava could be derived from Germanic -ahwa (water), but it is typical also for older Slovak hydronyms.

The earliest records are fl. Arua (1287) and Oravia (1314).
