= List of twin towns and sister cities in Slovakia =

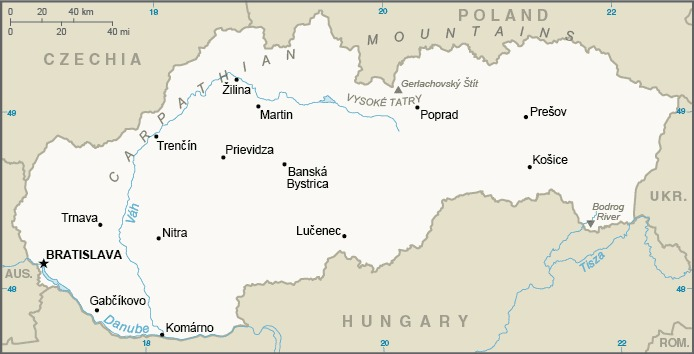
Map of Slovakia

This is a list of municipalities in Slovakia which have standing links to local communities in other countries known as "town twinning" (usually in Europe) or "sister cities" (usually in the rest of the world).

== A ==
Andovce

- Nagykovácsi, Hungary
- Szákszend, Hungary

== B ==
Bánovce nad Bebravou

- Kopřivnice, Czech Republic
- Lubliniec, Poland

Banská Bystrica

- Alba, Italy
- Budva, Montenegro
- Charleston, United States
- Dabas, Hungary
- Durham, England, United Kingdom
- Halberstadt, Germany
- Herzliya, Israel
- Hradec Králové, Czech Republic
- Kovačica, Serbia
- Larissa, Greece
- Mangalia, Romania
- Montana, Bulgaria
- Radom, Poland
- Salgótarján, Hungary
- Tarnobrzeg, Poland
- Vršac, Serbia
- Zadar, Croatia

Banská Štiavnica

- Hünenberg, Switzerland
- Moravská Třebová, Czech Republic
- Olsztynek, Poland
- Ptuj, Slovenia
- Sopron, Hungary
- Tatabánya, Hungary

Bardejov

- Calais, France
- Česká Lípa, Czech Republic
- Gorlice, Poland
- Jasło, Poland
- Kaštela, Croatia
- Krynica-Zdrój, Poland
- Mikulov, Czech Republic
- Molde, Norway
- Muszyna, Poland
- Přerov, Czech Republic
- Sárospatak, Hungary
- Sremski Karlovci, Serbia
- Tiachiv, Ukraine
- Zamość, Poland

Belá-Dulice

- Poraj, Poland

Beluša

- Kistarcsa, Hungary

Blatná na Ostrove

- Mezőtúr, Hungary
- Tarany, Hungary

Bojná

- Modrá, Czech Republic

Bojnice

- Bad Krozingen, Germany
- Jeseník, Czech Republic
- La Louvière, Belgium
- Rosta, Italy
- Zator, Poland

Borský Mikuláš

- Napajedla, Czech Republic

Bratislava

- Alexandria, Egypt
- Bremen, Germany
- Brno, Czech Republic
- Cleveland, United States
- Kyiv, Ukraine
- Kraków, Poland
- Larnaca, Cyprus
- Ljubljana, Slovenia
- Perugia, Italy
- Székesfehérvár, Hungary
- Thessaloniki, Greece
- Turku, Finland
- Yerevan, Armenia

Bratislava – Devínska Nová Ves

- Omišalj, Croatia
- Preko, Croatia
- Saint-Brice-sous-Forêt, France
- Sveti Ilija, Croatia

Bratislava – Jarovce

- Benkovac, Croatia

Bratislava – Nové Mesto

- Kifissia, Greece
- Prague 7 (Prague), Czech Republic

Bratislava – Old Town

- Budavár (Budapest), Hungary
- Innere Stadt (Vienna), Austria
- Olomouc, Czech Republic
- Prague 1 (Prague), Czech Republic

Bratislava – Petržalka

- Prague 5 (Prague), Czech Republic

Bratislava – Rača

- Gols, Austria
- Morawica, Poland
- Priverno, Italy
- Staré Město pod Landštejnem, Czech Republic

Bratislava – Ružinov

- (Georgia (country)) Mtskheta, Georgia
- Tapolca, Hungary
- Umag, Croatia
- Znojmo, Czech Republic

Bratislava – Vajnory

- Alviano, Italy
- Brno-Vinohrady (Brno), Czech Republic
- Wolfsthal, Austria

Bratislava – Záhorská Bystrica

- Brumovice, Czech Republic
- Göttlesbrunn-Arbesthal, Austria
- Riese Pio X, Italy

Brezno

- Ciechanów, Poland
- Čačak, Serbia
- Meudon, France
- Nădlac, Romania
- Nový Bydžov, Czech Republic

Brezová pod Bradlom

- Břeclav, Czech Republic
- Paulhan, France
- Pohořelice, Czech Republic

Budmerice

- Nădlac, Romania

Bušince

- Nepomuk, Czech Republic

Bytča

- Karolinka, Czech Republic
- Opoczno, Poland

Bziny

- Boyarka, Ukraine
- Krásná, Czech Republic
- Privlaka, Croatia
- Wilkowice, Poland

== C ==
Čachtice

- Žužemberk, Slovenia

Čadca

- Toruń, Poland
- Valašské Meziříčí, Czech Republic
- Żywiec, Poland

Chorvátsky Grob

- Benkovac, Croatia

Čierna nad Tisou

- Chop, Ukraine

Čierne

- Hrádek, Czech Republic

Čierny Balog

- Týniště nad Orlicí, Czech Republic

Čiližská Radvaň

- Kisbajcs, Hungary
- Reci, Romania

== D ==
Detva

- Tuchów, Poland

Dobšiná

- Kobiór, Poland
- Rudabánya, Hungary
- Sajószentpéter, Hungary
- Šternberk, Czech Republic
- Teistungen, Germany

Doľany

- Bolatice, Czech Republic

Dolné Obdokovce

- Kerepes, Hungary

Dolný Kubín

- Eger, Hungary
- Kamianets-Podilskyi, Ukraine
- Limanowa, Poland
- Pakrac, Croatia
- Pelhřimov, Czech Republic
- Svendborg, Denmark
- Truskavets, Ukraine
- Zawiercie, Poland

Dolný Štál

- Biatorbágy, Hungary
- Győrszentiván (Győr), Hungary
- Păuleni-Ciuc, Romania
- Šupljak (Subotica), Serbia
- Tárkány, Hungary
- Velyka Dobron, Ukraine

Dubnica nad Váhom

- Otrokovice, Czech Republic
- Vác, Hungary
- Yaroslavl, Russia
- Zawadzkie, Poland

Dudince

- Kent, United States

Dunajská Streda

- Berehove, Ukraine
- Dalaman, Turkey
- Gödöllő, Hungary
- Győr, Hungary
- Jimbolia, Romania
- Jindřichův Hradec, Czech Republic
- Odorheiu Secuiesc, Romania
- Senta, Serbia
- Subotica, Serbia

Dvory nad Žitavou

- Kocsér, Hungary
- Örkény, Hungary
- Vértesszőlős, Hungary

== F ==
Fiľakovo

- Bátonyterenye, Hungary
- Szécsény, Hungary
- Szigethalom, Hungary
- Ustrzyki Dolne, Poland

== G ==
Gabčíkovo

- Enese, Hungary
- Kondoros, Hungary
- Mihăileni, Romania
- Nagymaros, Hungary
- Pázmándfalu, Hungary

Galanta

- Albignasego, Italy
- Bečej, Serbia
- Kecskemét, Hungary
- Liptovský Mikuláš, Slovakia
- Mikulov, Czech Republic
- Paks, Hungary
- Tótkomlós, Hungary

Gbely

- Deutsch-Wagram, Austria
- Židlochovice, Czech Republic

Gelnica

- Horní Suchá, Czech Republic
- Novodnistrovsk, Ukraine
- Le Pradet, France
- Rudnik nad Sanem, Poland

== H ==
Hamuliakovo

- Deutsch Jahrndorf, Austria
- Kerekegyháza, Hungary
- Rajka, Hungary

Handlová

- Konopiska, Poland
- Sárisáp, Hungary
- Voerde, Germany
- Zábřeh, Czech Republic

Hanušovce nad Topľou

- Dębica (rural gmina), Poland
- Nozdrzec, Poland
- Velká Bíteš, Czech Republic

Hlohovec

- De Panne, Belgium
- Hranice, Czech Republic
- Slovenske Konjice, Slovenia

Hnúšťa

- Dobruška, Czech Republic
- Lwówek County, Poland

Holíč

- Maloyaroslavets, Russia
- Gložan (Bački Petrovac), Serbia
- Hodonín, Czech Republic
- Hollabrunn, Austria

Horná Súča

- Slavičín, Czech Republic
- Wilamowice, Poland

Horné Srnie

- Sieraków, Poland
- Slavičín, Czech Republic

Hruštín

- Zabierzów, Poland

Humenné

- Darney, France
- Jarosław, Poland
- Mátészalka, Hungary
- Mukachevo, Ukraine
- Perechyn, Ukraine
- Przemyśl, Poland
- Sanok, Poland
- Šibenik, Croatia
- Třebíč, Czech Republic
- Vidnoye, Russia

Hurbanovo

- Lovran, Croatia
- Pápa, Hungary
- Žlutice, Czech Republic

== I ==
Ilava

- Klimkovice, Czech Republic
- Mikołów, Poland

Ivanka pri Dunaji

- Pozořice, Czech Republic

== J ==
Jasov

- Bélapátfalva, Hungary
- Nyírmada, Hungary
- Sântimbru, Romania
- Tura, Hungary

Jelšava

- Nădlac, Romania
- Szczekociny, Poland
- Tótkomlós, Hungary
- Uničov, Czech Republic

Jurová

- Andocs, Hungary

== K ==
Kálnica

- Popovice, Czech Republic

Kamenec pod Vtáčnikom

- Dolní Bečva, Czech Republic
- Neureichenau, Germany
- Postřelmov, Czech Republic

Kanianka

- Fryšták, Czech Republic
- Ruda nad Moravou, Czech Republic

Kechnec

- Isaszeg, Hungary

Keť

- Diósd, Hungary
- Hosszúpereszteg, Hungary
- Kéty, Hungary
- Kęty, Poland
- Lázi, Hungary

Kežmarok

- Bochnia, Poland
- Gliwice, Poland
- Hajdúszoboszló, Hungary
- Kupiškis, Lithuania
- Lanškroun, Czech Republic
- Lesneven, France
- Nowy Targ, Poland
- Příbram, Czech Republic
- Weilburg, Germany
- Zgierz, Poland

Kolárovo

- Galgaguta, Hungary
- Kisbér, Hungary
- Medgyesegyháza, Hungary
- Mezőberény, Hungary
- Pitvaros, Hungary

Komárno

- Blansko, Czech Republic
- Komárom, Hungary
- Kralupy nad Vltavou, Czech Republic
- Lieto, Finland
- Sebeş, Romania
- Terezín, Czech Republic
- Weißenfels, Germany

Košeca

- Štítná nad Vláří-Popov, Czech Republic

Košice

- Abaújszántó, Hungary
- Budapest, Hungary
- Bursa, Turkey
- Cottbus, Germany
- Katowice, Poland
- Miskolc, Hungary
- Niš, Serbia
- Ostrava, Czech Republic
- Plovdiv, Bulgaria
- Raahe, Finland
- Rzeszów, Poland
- Uzhhorod, Ukraine
- Vysoké Tatry, Slovakia
- Wuppertal, Germany

Kováčová

- Volyně, Czech Republic

Kráľovský Chlmec

- Berehove, Ukraine
- Felsőzsolca, Hungary
- Ferencváros (Budapest), Hungary
- Kanjiža, Serbia
- Kisvárda, Hungary
- Rakovník, Czech Republic
- Sfântu Gheorghe, Romania

Krasňany

- Castello Tesino, Italy
- Strumień, Poland

Krásno nad Kysucou

- Frenštát pod Radhoštěm, Czech Republic
- Metylovice, Czech Republic

Krásnohorská Dlhá Lúka

- Ibrány, Hungary
- Ragály, Hungary
- Zubogy, Hungary

Kremnica

- Fidenza, Italy
- Herbolzheim, Germany
- Kutná Hora, Czech Republic
- Nový Jičín, Czech Republic
- Várpalota, Hungary

Krompachy

- Békéscsaba, Hungary
- Gaszowice, Poland
- Nădlac, Romania
- Ozimek, Poland
- Rýmařov, Czech Republic

Krupina

- Anykščiai, Lithuania
- Krapinske Toplice, Croatia
- Nepomuk, Czech Republic

Kuchyňa

- Podolí, Czech Republic

Kunerad

- Wilamowice, Poland

Kysucké Nové Mesto

- Gogolin, Poland
- Jablunkov, Czech Republic
- Łodygowice, Poland
- Rive-de-Gier, France

== L ==
Ladce

- Kelč, Czech Republic

Lazany

- Úsov, Czech Republic

Lednické Rovne

- Provodov, Czech Republic

Lehota pod Vtáčnikom

- Bludov, Czech Republic

Lendak

- Konstantynów Łódzki, Poland

Leopoldov

- Fertőszentmiklós, Hungary

Levice

- Boskovice, Czech Republic
- Érd, Hungary
- Lubaczów, Poland
- Náměšť na Hané, Czech Republic
- Ruda Śląska, Poland
- Skierniewice, Poland

Levoča

- Kalwaria Zebrzydowska, Poland
- Keszthely, Hungary
- Łańcut, Poland
- Litomyšl, Czech Republic
- Stary Sącz, Poland

Likavka

- Popești, Romania
- Slatiňany, Czech Republic
- Wilkowice, Poland

Lipany

- Bílovec, Czech Republic
- Khust, Ukraine

Liptovská Teplička

- Dolní Čermná, Czech Republic

Liptovské Revúce

- Chlebičov, Czech Republic

Liptovský Hrádok

- Česká Skalice, Czech Republic
- Hradec nad Moravicí, Czech Republic
- Nowy Targ (rural gmina), Poland
- Stary Sącz, Poland

Liptovský Mikuláš

- Annecy, France
- Bačka Palanka, Serbia
- Galanta, Slovakia
- Kalamaria, Greece
- Kemi, Finland
- Kiskőrös, Hungary
- Michalovce, Slovakia
- Opava, Czech Republic
- Terchová, Slovakia
- Żywiec, Poland

Lisková

- Kravaře, Czech Republic
- Woźniki, Poland

Lučenec

- Louny, Czech Republic
- Mělník, Czech Republic
- Pápa, Hungary
- Polesella, Italy
- Salgótarján, Hungary
- Zolotonosha, Ukraine

== M ==
Malacky

- Albertirsa, Hungary
- Gänserndorf, Austria
- Szarvas, Hungary
- Veselí nad Moravou, Czech Republic
- Żnin, Poland

Malinovo

- Csókakő, Hungary
- Hédervár, Hungary
- Idrifaia (Suplac), Romania

Martin

- Bački Petrovac, Serbia
- Balashikha, Russia
- Békéscsaba, Hungary
- Fargo, United States
- Gotha, Germany
- Hoogeveen, Netherlands
- Jičín, Czech Republic
- Kalisz, Poland

Medzev is a member of the Charter of European Rural Communities, a town twinning association across the European Union. Medzev also has two other twin towns.

Charter of European Rural Communities

- Bienvenida, Spain
- Bièvre, Belgium
- Bucine, Italy
- (Republic of Ireland) Cashel, Ireland
- Cissé, France
- Desborough, England, United Kingdom
- Esch (Haaren), Netherlands
- Hepstedt, Germany
- Ibănești, Romania
- Kandava (Tukums), Latvia
- Kannus, Finland
- Kolindros, Greece
- Lassee, Austria
- Næstved, Denmark
- Nagycenk, Hungary
- Nadur, Malta
- Ockelbo, Sweden
- Pano Lefkara, Cyprus
- Põlva, Estonia
- Samuel (Soure), Portugal
- Starý Poddvorov, Czech Republic
- Strzyżów, Poland
- Svoge, Bulgaria
- Tisno, Croatia
- Troisvierges, Luxembourg
- Žagarė (Joniškis), Lithuania

Other

- Holice, Czech Republic
- Rátka, Hungary

Medzilaborce

- Kozienice, Poland
- Náměšť nad Oslavou, Czech Republic

Michalovce

- Cognac, France
- Jarosław, Poland
- Kavarna, Bulgaria
- Liptovský Mikuláš, Slovakia
- Pančevo, Serbia
- Uzhhorod, Ukraine
- Vila-real, Spain
- Vyškov, Czech Republic

Modra

- Benátky nad Jizerou, Czech Republic
- Hustopeče, Czech Republic
- Overijse, Belgium

Modra nad Cirochou

- Czarna, Poland
- Modrá, Czech Republic

Modrany

- Acățari, Romania
- Isztimér, Hungary
- Kocs, Hungary
- Sükösd, Hungary

Modrý Kameň

- Bercel, Hungary

Moldava nad Bodvou

- Brzozów, Poland
- Cristuru Secuiesc, Romania
- Edelény, Hungary
- Encs, Hungary
- Karcag, Hungary
- Pestszentlőrinc-Pestszentimre (Budapest), Hungary
- Siklós, Hungary
- Tarcal, Hungary
- Tišnov, Czech Republic

Mošovce

- Dwikozy, Poland
- Kozy, Poland
- Lalić (Odžaci), Serbia

Mostová

- Bábolna, Hungary
- Bikal, Hungary
- Erdőkürt, Hungary
- Hejőkürt, Hungary
- Ojdula, Romania
- Tiszakürt, Hungary

Muráň

- Fryšták, Czech Republic

Myjava

- Åsnes, Norway
- Dubove, Ukraine
- Janošik (Alibunar), Serbia
- Little Falls, United States
- Kostelec nad Orlicí, Czech Republic

== N ==
Námestovo

- Humpolec, Czech Republic
- Myszków, Poland
- Orlová, Czech Republic

Nemšová

- Hluk, Czech Republic

Nenince

- Baktalórántháza, Hungary
- Ciumani, Romania
- Dány, Hungary
- Ráckeve, Hungary

Nesvady

- Felsőszentiván, Hungary
- Kiskőrös, Hungary
- Nagyigmánd, Hungary

Nitra

- Bački Petrovac, Serbia
- České Budějovice, Czech Republic
- Gyeongju, South Korea
- Kroměříž, Czech Republic
- Naperville, United States
- Osijek, Croatia
- Spišská Nová Ves, Slovakia
- Veszprém, Hungary
- Zielona Góra, Poland

Nitrianske Pravno

- Hanušovice, Czech Republic

Nitrianske Sučany

- Bohdíkov, Czech Republic

Nižná

- Horní Suchá, Czech Republic
- Mszana Dolna, Poland

Nižný Hrušov

- Hatvan, Hungary
- Iwonicz-Zdrój, Poland
- Lesné, Slovakia
- Skołyszyn, Poland

Nová Baňa

- Mimoň, Czech Republic
- Nin, Croatia

Nová Bošáca

- Košíky, Czech Republic

Nová Bystrica

- Josipovac (Osijek), Croatia
- Řeka, Czech Republic

Nová Dubnica

- Červený Kameň, Slovakia
- Cheb, Czech Republic
- Dubna, Russia
- Pruské, Slovakia
- Slavičín, Czech Republic

Nová Ľubovňa

- Zašová, Czech Republic

Nováky

- Jílové u Prahy, Czech Republic
- Oslavany, Czech Republic

Nové Mesto nad Váhom

- Jirkov, Czech Republic
- Oslavany, Czech Republic

Nové Zámky

- Fonyód, Hungary
- Sevnica, Slovenia
- Tábor, Czech Republic
- Znojmo, Czech Republic

== O ==
Ochodnica

- Dobrá, Czech Republic
- Mucharz, Poland

Oravský Podzámok

- Lipinki, Poland
- Vodňany, Czech Republic
- Włodowice, Poland

Oščadnica

- Lipowa, Poland

Ostrý Grúň

- Kandanos, Greece
- Napajedla, Czech Republic

== P ==
Palárikovo

- Zubří, Czech Republic

Papradno

- Karolinka, Czech Republic

Partizánske

- Bajina Bašta, Serbia
- Benešov, Czech Republic
- Krapkowice, Poland
- Náchod, Czech Republic
- Otrokovice, Czech Republic
- Svit, Slovakia
- Valašské Meziříčí, Czech Republic
- Vukovar, Croatia
- Zlín, Czech Republic

Pezinok

- Izola, Slovenia
- Kyjov, Czech Republic
- Mladá Boleslav, Czech Republic
- Most, Czech Republic
- Mosonmagyaróvár, Hungary
- Neusiedl am See, Austria

Piešťany

- Eilat, Israel
- Hajdúnánás, Hungary
- Heinola, Finland
- Luhačovice, Czech Republic
- Poděbrady, Czech Republic
- Ustroń, Poland
- Varaždinske Toplice, Croatia

Plešivec

- Alsózsolca, Hungary
- Matei, Romania

Podolínec

- Rytro, Poland

Poprad

- Pordenone, Italy
- Szarvas, Hungary
- Ústí nad Orlicí, Czech Republic
- Vysoké Tatry, Slovakia
- Zakopane, Poland

Považská Bystrica

- Bačka Palanka, Serbia
- Bełchatów, Poland
- Gjorče Petrov (Skopje), North Macedonia
- Holešov, Czech Republic
- Rožnov pod Radhoštěm, Czech Republic
- Sovetsk, Russia
- Tauragė, Lithuania
- Zhodzina, Belarus
- Zubří, Czech Republic

Prešov

- Gabrovo, Bulgaria
- Keratsini, Greece
- Mukachevo, Ukraine
- Nowy Sącz, Poland
- Nyíregyháza, Hungary
- Pittsburgh, United States
- Prague 10 (Prague), Czech Republic
- Remscheid, Germany
- Rishon LeZion, Israel

Pribylina

- Ropice, Czech Republic

Prievidza

- Ibbenbüren, Germany
- Jastrzębie-Zdrój, Poland
- Luserna San Giovanni, Italy
- Šumperk, Czech Republic
- Valjevo, Serbia
- Velenje, Slovenia

Púchov

- Bila Tserkva, Ukraine
- Hlinsko, Czech Republic
- Omsk, Russia
- Stara Pazova, Serbia

Pukanec

- Nădlac, Romania

== R ==
Radzovce

- Seč, Czech Republic
- Varsány, Hungary

Rajec

- Czechowice-Dziedzice, Poland
- Kęty, Poland
- Krnov, Czech Republic
- Rýmařov, Czech Republic

Rajecké Teplice

- Dolní Benešov, Czech Republic
- Padina (Kovačica), Serbia
- Pozlovice, Czech Republic
- Wilamowice, Poland

Raková

- Lipowa, Poland
- Stará Ves nad Ondřejnicí, Czech Republic

Raslavice

- Călărași, Moldova
- Călărași, Romania
- Copceac, Moldova
- Dydnia, Poland
- Korzenna, Poland
- Radslavice, Czech Republic

Rejdová

- Kovačica, Serbia
- Sajóbábony, Hungary

Revúca

- Kazincbarcika, Hungary
- Lędziny, Poland
- Litovel, Czech Republic
- Pakrac, Croatia
- Selca, Croatia

Rimavská Sobota

- Kolín, Czech Republic
- Ózd, Hungary
- Salonta, Romania
- Świętochłowice, Poland
- Tiszaújváros, Hungary

Rohožník

- Kašava, Czech Republic
- Rogoźnik (Gmina Nowy Targ), Poland

Rožňava

- Bačka Topola, Serbia
- Belváros-Lipótváros (Budapest), Hungary
- Český Těšín, Czech Republic
- Cieszyn, Poland
- Szerencs, Hungary

Ružomberok

- Bački Petrovac, Serbia
- Děčín, Czech Republic
- Gospić, Croatia
- Hlučín, Czech Republic
- Kroměříž, Czech Republic
- Prague 6 (Prague), Czech Republic
- Wisła, Poland

== S ==
Sabinov

- Çubuk, Turkey
- Kenderes, Hungary
- Siedlce, Poland
- Soběslav, Czech Republic

Šahy

- Héhalom, Hungary
- Vác, Hungary
- Veresegyház, Hungary

Šaľa

- Końskie, Poland
- Kuhmo, Finland
- Mohyliv-Podilskyi, Ukraine
- Oroszlány, Hungary
- Telč, Czech Republic

Šamorín

- Gheorgheni, Romania
- Hainburg an der Donau, Austria
- Mosonmagyaróvár, Hungary
- Uherský Brod, Czech Republic

Šaštín-Stráže

- Bełżyce, Poland
- Brody, Ukraine
- Moravské Budějovice, Czech Republic

Semerovo

- Nisko, Poland
- Šatov, Czech Republic

Senec

- Ialoveni, Moldova
- Kőszeg, Hungary
- Milovice, Czech Republic
- Mosonmagyaróvár, Hungary
- Parndorf, Austria
- Senj, Croatia

Senica

- Bač, Serbia
- Herzogenbuchsee, Switzerland
- Pułtusk, Poland
- Santa Tecla, El Salvador
- Trutnov, Czech Republic
- Velké Pavlovice, Czech Republic

Šenkvice

- Hrvatska Kostajnica, Croatia
- Velké Bílovice, Czech Republic

Sereď

- Tišnov, Czech Republic

Skalica

- Arcueil, France
- Freyburg, Germany
- Hodonín, Czech Republic
- Schwechat, Austria
- Slaný, Czech Republic
- Strážnice, Czech Republic
- Uherské Hradiště, Czech Republic

Sládkovičovo

- Csorvás, Hungary
- Diosig, Romania
- Ivančice, Czech Republic

Slepčany

- Letovice, Czech Republic

Sliač

- Přibyslav, Czech Republic

Smižany

- Borsodnádasd, Hungary
- Kamienica, Poland
- Komorniki, Poland

Snina

- Boguchwała, Poland
- Khust, Ukraine
- Lesko, Poland
- Prague 4 (Prague), Czech Republic
- Seferihisar, Turkey
- Žarošice, Czech Republic

Sobrance

- Cigánd, Hungary
- Lubaczów, Poland
- Perechyn, Ukraine

Spišská Belá

- Vysoké Mýto, Czech Republic
- Brück, Germany
- Ożarów, Poland
- Szczawnica, Poland

Spišská Nová Ves

- L'Aigle, France
- Alsfeld, Germany
- Clausthal-Zellerfeld, Germany
- Grójec, Poland
- Havlíčkův Brod, Czech Republic
- Joinville, Brazil
- Kisújszállás, Hungary
- Myślenice, Poland
- Nitra, Slovakia
- Preveza, Greece
- Tiachiv, Ukraine
- Tongzhou (Beijing), China
- Youngstown, United States

Spišské Podhradie

- Głogów Małopolski, Poland
- Ogrodzieniec, Poland
- Perechyn, Ukraine
- Pinetop-Lakeside, United States
- Show Low, United States
- Vrbové, Slovakia

Stakčín

- Lutowiska, Poland
- Slavonice, Czech Republic

Stará Bystrica

- Gorzyce, Poland
- Řeka, Czech Republic

Stará Ľubovňa

- Aleșd, Romania
- Bački Petrovac, Serbia
- Balchik, Bulgaria
- Biograd na Moru, Croatia
- North Augusta, United States
- Nowy Sącz, Poland
- Połaniec, Poland
- Svaliava, Ukraine
- Vsetín, Czech Republic

Stará Turá

- Kunovice, Czech Republic

Strážske

- Dolna Banya, Bulgaria
- Drahanská vrchovina (microregion), Czech Republic
- Nieporęt, Poland

Stropkov

- Biłgoraj, Poland
- Bílina, Czech Republic
- Korczyna, Poland
- Novovolynsk, Ukraine
- Ropczyce, Poland

Stupava

- Ivančice, Czech Republic
- Kuřim, Czech Republic
- Łowicz, Poland
- Nagykovácsi, Hungary
- Svoge, Bulgaria

Štúrovo

- Baraolt, Romania
- Bruntál, Czech Republic
- Castellarano, Italy
- Esztergom, Hungary
- Kłobuck, Poland
- Kőbánya (Budapest), Hungary
- Novi Bečej, Serbia

Štvrtok na Ostrove

- Balatonederics, Hungary
- Cozmeni, Romania
- Gyömrő, Hungary
- Máriakálnok, Hungary

Sučany

- Fulnek, Czech Republic

Svätý Jur

- Bělá pod Bezdězem, Czech Republic

Svidník

- Chrudim, Czech Republic
- Jarosław, Poland
- Kriva Palanka, North Macedonia
- Rakhiv, Ukraine
- Sanok County, Poland
- Strzyżów, Poland
- Świdnik, Poland
- Vrbas, Serbia

Svit

- Česká Třebová, Czech Republic
- Knurów, Poland
- Partizánske, Slovakia
- San Lorenzo in Campo, Italy

Svodín

- Bystřice, Czech Republic
- Pińczów, Poland
- Tata, Hungary

== T ==
Tekovské Lužany

- Bátaszék, Hungary
- Kondoros, Hungary

Teplička nad Váhom

- Moravský Beroun, Czech Republic
- Pawłowice, Poland

Tisovec

- Ludgeřovice, Czech Republic
- Nowy Żmigród, Poland
- Putnok, Hungary
- Shenandoah, United States
- Tăuții-Măgherăuș, Romania

Topoľčany

- Artern, Germany
- Jászberény, Hungary
- Luhačovice, Czech Republic
- Mazingarbe, France
- Prilep, North Macedonia
- Rybnik, Poland

Topoľčianky

- Holešov, Czech Republic

Topoľníky

- Kóny, Hungary
- Milówka, Poland

Tornaľa

- Heves, Hungary
- Putnok, Hungary
- Tarnów (rural gmina), Poland
- Valea lui Mihai, Romania

Trebišov

- Hodonín, Czech Republic
- Jasło, Poland

Trenčianska Teplá

- Jastrebarsko, Croatia
- Uherský Ostroh, Czech Republic

Trenčianska Turná

- Bojkovice, Czech Republic

Trenčianske Teplice

- Aschersleben, Germany
- Tuzla, Turkey
- Vsetín, Czech Republic
- Wilamowice, Poland

Trenčín

- Békéscsaba, Hungary
- Casalecchio di Reno, Italy
- Cran-Gevrier (Annecy), France
- Kragujevac, Serbia
- Tarnów, Poland
- Zlín, Czech Republic

Trnava

- Balakovo, Russia
- Břeclav, Czech Republic
- Casale Monferrato, Italy
- Chomutov, Czech Republic
- Kharkiv, Ukraine
- Novo Mesto, Slovenia
- Sangerhausen, Germany
- Szombathely, Hungary
- Varaždin, Croatia
- Zabrze, Poland

Trnávka

- Tárnok, Hungary

Trstená

- Hořice, Czech Republic
- Isaszeg, Hungary
- Jabłonka, Poland
- Ozorków, Poland
- Želiezovce, Slovakia
- Žirovnice, Czech Republic

Trstice

- Dunaszeg, Hungary
- Inárcs, Hungary
- Újbuda (Budapest), Hungary

Turčianske Teplice

- Aranđelovac, Serbia
- Holešov, Czech Republic
- Havířov, Czech Republic
- Skawina, Poland

Turzovka

- Frýdlant nad Ostravicí, Czech Republic
- Kęty, Poland

Tvrdošín

- Durbuy, Belgium
- Kobylnica, Poland
- Kościelisko, Poland
- Orimattila, Finland
- Östhammar, Sweden
- Valga, Estonia
- Valka, Latvia

Tvrdošovce

- Bonyhád, Hungary
- Környe, Hungary
- Nagyatád, Hungary
- Piliscsév, Hungary
- Szákszend, Hungary
- Tardos, Hungary
- Zetea, Romania

== U ==
Uhrovec

- Gilowice, Poland
- Kiskunfélegyháza, Hungary
- Modrá, Czech Republic
- Slavičín, Czech Republic

== V ==
Valaliky

- Košťany, Czech Republic
- Košťany nad Turcom, Slovakia

Valaská

- Chlumec nad Cidlinou, Czech Republic

Veľká Lomnica

- Lomnice, Czech Republic

Veľké Kapušany

- Vásárosnamény, Hungary

Veľký Krtíš

- Aleksin, Russia
- Písek, Czech Republic

Veľký Meder

- Bácsalmás, Hungary
- Dobruška, Czech Republic
- Tápiógyörgye, Hungary

Veľký Šariš

- Grybów, Poland
- Nyírtelek, Hungary
- Rakoshino, Ukraine

Vráble

- Andouillé, France
- Csurgó, Hungary
- Nova Varoš, Serbia

Vranov nad Topľou

- Boguchwała, Poland
- Bystřice nad Pernštejnem, Czech Republic
- Dynów, Poland
- Mád, Hungary
- Vynohradiv, Ukraine

Vrbové

- Spišské Podhradie, Slovakia
- Vítkov, Czech Republic

Vrútky

- Bebra, Germany
- Fulnek, Czech Republic
- Łaziska Górne, Poland
- Nymburk, Czech Republic

Vysoká nad Kysucou

- Karolinka, Czech Republic

Vysoké Tatry

- Bukowina Tatrzańska, Poland
- Košice, Slovakia
- Nosegawa, Japan
- Pardubice, Czech Republic
- Poprad, Slovakia
- Prostějov, Czech Republic
- Zakopane, Poland

== Z ==
Zábiedovo

- Dobratice, Czech Republic

Zatín

- Cârța, Romania
- Helvécia, Hungary
- Yanoshi, Ukraine

Želiezovce

- Barcs, Hungary
- Makó, Hungary
- Miercurea Ciuc, Romania
- Trstená, Slovakia

Žiar nad Hronom

- Svitavy, Czech Republic

Žilina

- Bielsko-Biała, Poland
- Changchun, China
- Dnipro, Ukraine
- Essen, Belgium
- Frýdek-Místek, Czech Republic
- Kikinda, Serbia
- Plzeň, Czech Republic
- Prague 15 (Prague), Czech Republic
- Třinec, Czech Republic

Žirany

- Dorog, Hungary
- Papkeszi, Hungary

Žitavany

- Morkovice-Slížany, Czech Republic

Zlaté Moravce

- Hulín, Czech Republic
- Našice, Croatia
- Sierpc, Poland
- Szydłów, Poland
- Velké Přílepy, Czech Republic

Zvolen is a member of the Douzelage, a town twinning association of towns across the European Union. Zvolen also has five other twin towns.

Douzelage

- Agros, Cyprus
- Altea, Spain
- Asikkala, Finland
- Bad Kötzting, Germany
- Bellagio, Italy
- (Republic of Ireland) Bundoran, Ireland
- Chojna, Poland
- Granville, France
- Holstebro, Denmark
- Houffalize, Belgium
- Judenburg, Austria
- Kőszeg, Hungary
- Marsaskala, Malta
- Meerssen, Netherlands
- Niederanven, Luxembourg
- Oxelösund, Sweden
- Preveza, Greece
- Rokiškis, Lithuania
- Rovinj, Croatia
- Sesimbra, Portugal
- Sherborne, England, United Kingdom
- Sigulda, Latvia
- Siret, Romania
- Škofja Loka, Slovenia
- Sušice, Czech Republic
- Tryavna, Bulgaria
- Türi, Estonia

Other

- Imatra, Finland
- Prachatice, Czech Republic
- Rivne, Ukraine
- Tótkomlós, Hungary
- Zwoleń, Poland
