= Modrá =

- Municipality
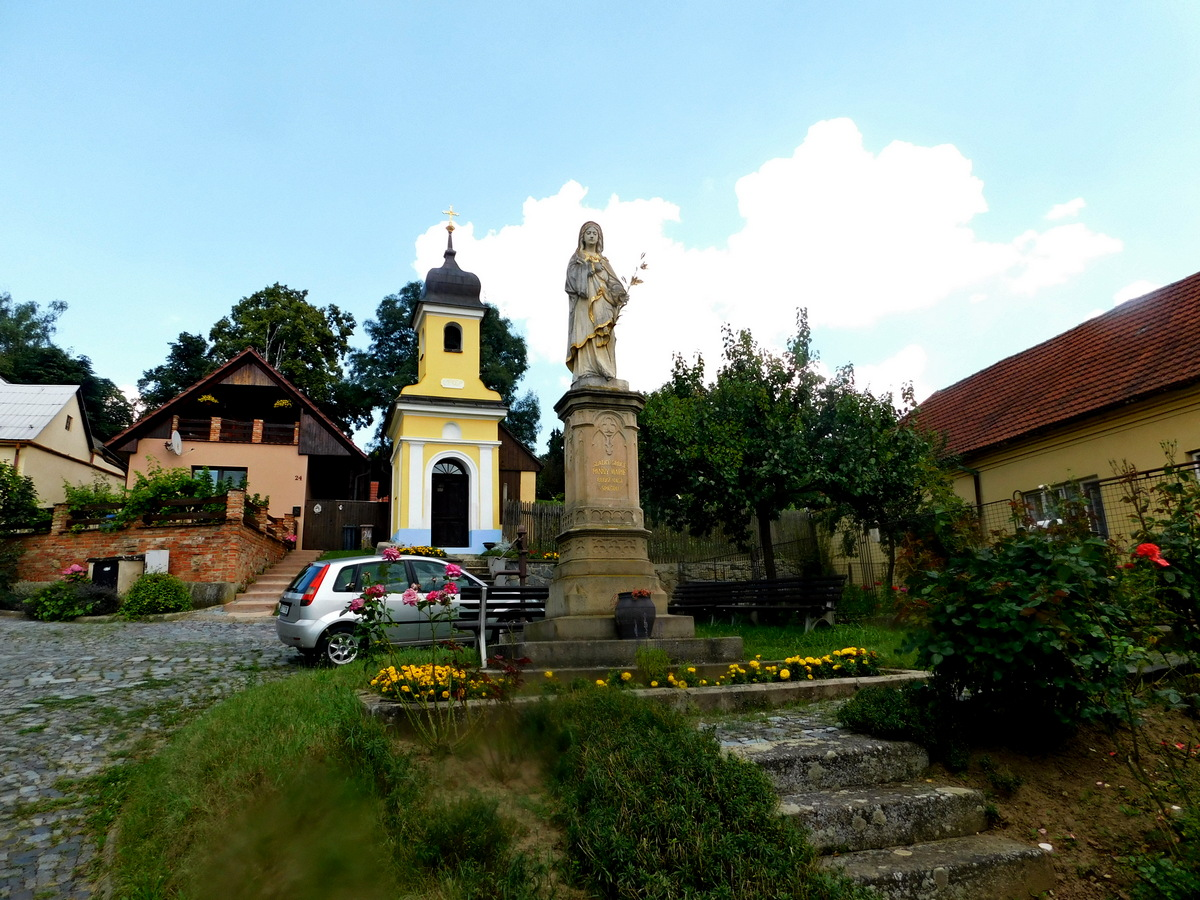
- Centre of Modrá

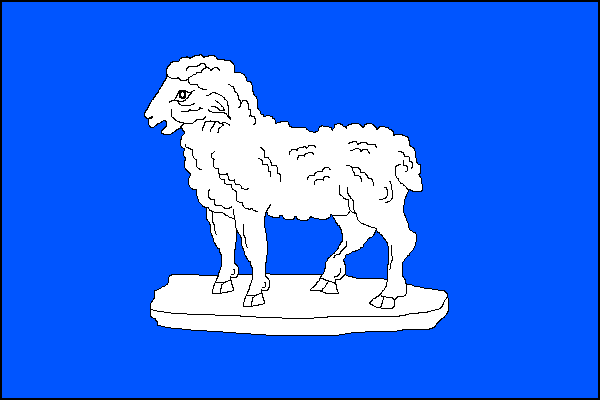
- Flag Coat of arms

- Location in the Czech Republic
- Coordinates: 49°6′43″N 17°24′12″E
- Country: Czech Republic
- Region: Zlín
- District: Uherské Hradiště
- First mentioned: 1220

Area
  - Total: 1.82 km^{2} (0.70 sq mi)
- Elevation: 220 m (720 ft)

Population (2026-01-01)
  - Total: 704
  - Density: 387/km^{2} (1,000/sq mi)
- Time zone: UTC+1 (CET)
  - Summer (DST): UTC+2 (CEST)
- Postal code: 687 06
- Website: www.obec-modra.cz

Modrá (Czech pronunciation: [ˈmodraː]; formerly Nová Ves; German: Neudorf) is a municipality and village in Uherské Hradiště District in the Zlín Region of the Czech Republic. It has about 700 inhabitants. The village proper is located on the stream Modřanský potok in the Chřiby highlands.

Modrá is known for an archaeological site with excavations from the Great Moravian period, which is protected as a national cultural monument, and for an archaeological open-air museum.

== Geography ==
Modrá is located about 6 kilometres (4 mi) northwest of Uherské Hradiště and 22 km (14 mi) southwest of Zlín. It lies mostly in the Chřiby highlands, only the southernmost part of the municipal territory extends into the Kyjov Hills. The highest point is at 297 m (974 ft) above sea level. The built-up area lies in the valley of the stream Modřanský potok.

== History ==
The territory of today's municipality has been inhabited since time immemorial. Archaeological finds testify to the human presence in about 5,000 BC. The present village was part of Velehrad until 1786, when it became separate.

== Demographics ==
Historical population

Year	Pop.	±%
1869	268	—
1880	357	+33.2%
1890	385	+7.8%
1900	411	+6.8%
1910	426	+3.6%

Year	Pop.	±%
1921	446	+4.7%
1930	453	+1.6%
1950	533	+17.7%
1961	656	+23.1%
1970	664	+1.2%

Year	Pop.	±%
1980	701	+5.6%
1991	649	−7.4%
2001	625	−3.7%
2011	691	+10.6%
2021	680	−1.6%

Source: Censuses

== Transport ==
There are no railways or major roads passing through the municipality.

== Sights ==
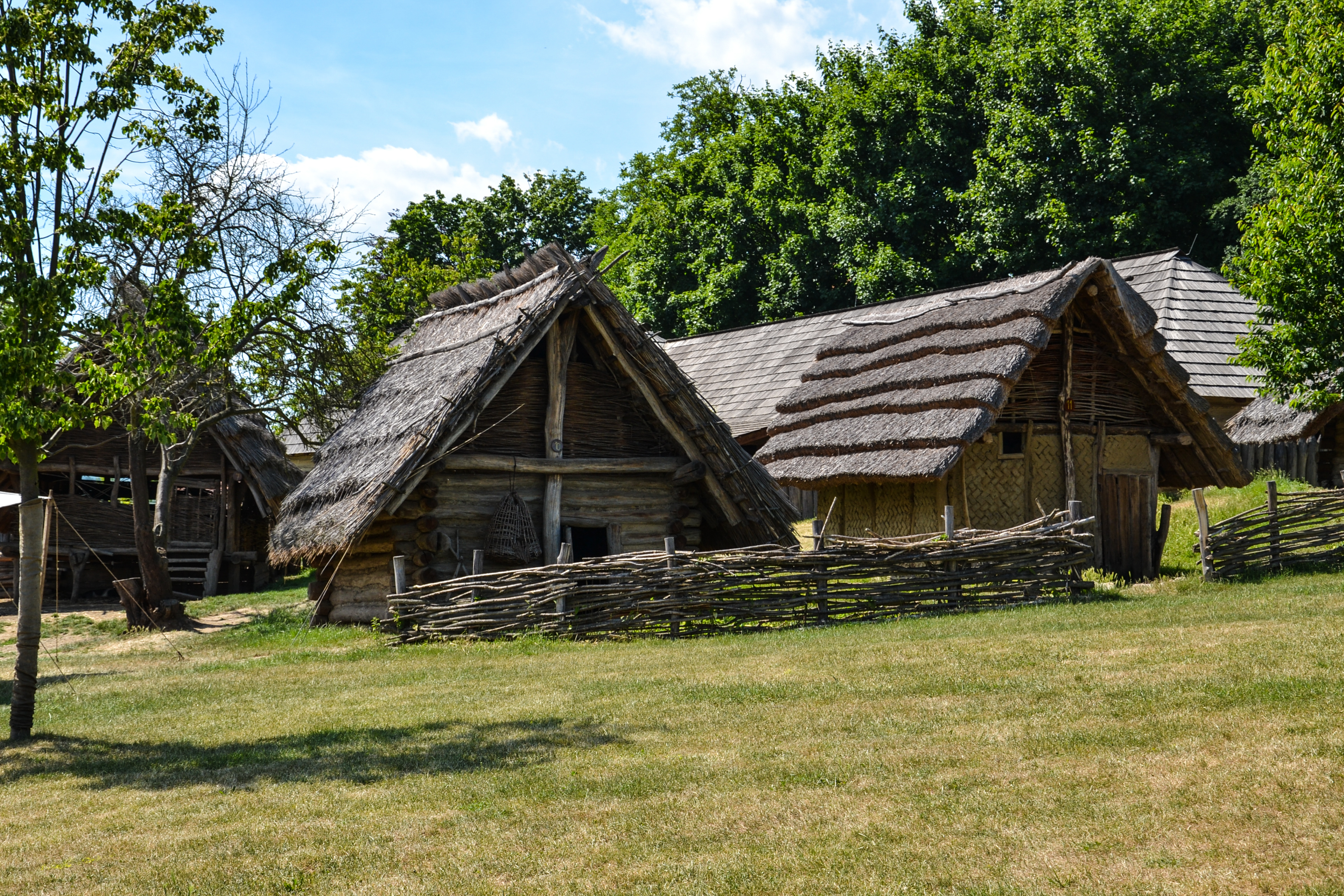
Open-air museum

In Modrá is an archaeological site with excavations from the Great Moravian period. The findings are presented in Modrá Archeoskanzen, which is an archaeological open-air museum with replicas of the Great Moravia period buildings. The archaeological site, which is called Díl u Božího syna, is protected as a national cultural monument (as part of the "set of monuments of the Great Moravian residential agglomeration in Staré Město – Uherské Hradiště – Modrá").

Živá voda Modrá is an outdoor exposition of Moravian wetlands biotop, containing indoor section with underwater glass tunnel showing freshwater fish in the outdoor pond. The outside exposition has various wetlands flora native to the region. A part of the exposition is an enclosure of aurochs, originating from the Milovice Nature Reserve.

== Twin towns – sister cities ==
Modrá is twinned with:

- Bojná, Slovakia
- Modra nad Cirochou, Slovakia
- Uhrovec, Slovakia
