= Bojna =

Bojna may refer to:

- Bojná, a village in Slovakia
- Bojna, Croatia, a village near Glina, Croatia
