= Aussee =

Not be confused with Aussie.

Aussee may refer to:

- Bad Aussee, Austria
- Aussee, German exonym for Úsov
