= Gergely Czuczor =

Hungarian poet, linguist, and librarian

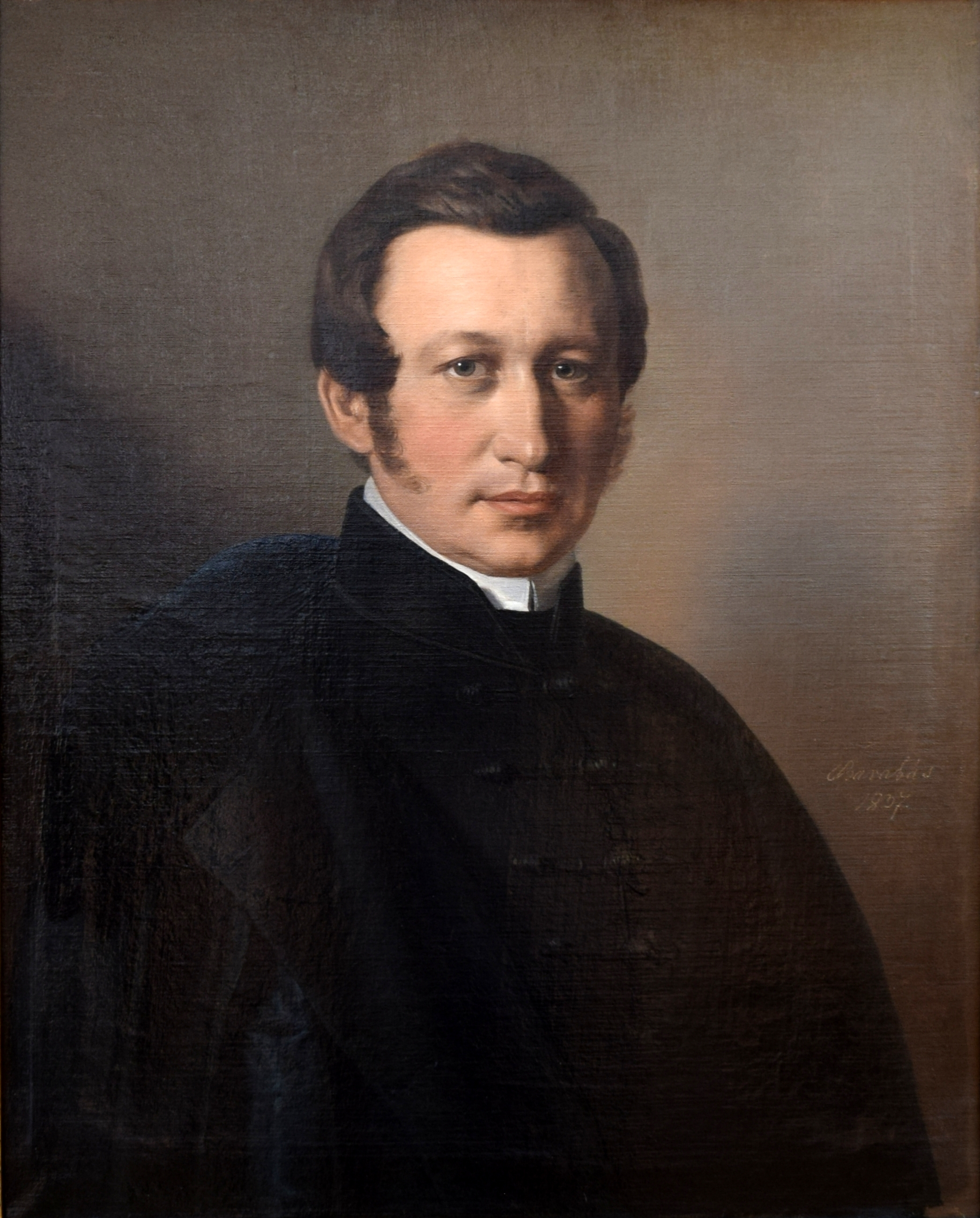
- His portrait by Miklós Barabás from 1837
- Born: István Czuczor; 17 December 1800; Andód
- Died: 9 September 1866 (aged 65); Pest
- Writing career
- Language: Hungarian

Gergely Czuczor (17 December 1800 – 9 September 1866) was a Hungarian Benedictine monk, a poet and linguist, member of the Hungarian Academy of Sciences. Baptized István (the Hungarian equivalent of Stephen) he took Gergely (Gregory) as his religious name.

As down-to-earth common sense a poet as Petőfi: his national poems also quickly became folk songs and popular. Both poets tended to emulate the rhythm of folk songs in their poems, which served the Nationalist cause in the popular common sense way.

He participated in the fight for freedom against Habsburg rule. One of his most famous poems, "Riadó" i.e. 'Alarm', was published in Kossuth's newspaper on 21 December 1848 while the Austrian troops were already closing in on Pest-Buda. It was also published on flyers, separately, and it quickly propagated amongst soldiers and the people as a sort of a march of the revolution quite as Petőfi's poems would.

A translation of the first part of his poem "Riadó":

Alarm

Screaming is the army whistle: alarmed be, Hungarian, alarmed!
To battle your country's calling, with sharpened steel be armed.
Its lightning may the dawn of freedom be painting,
And the purple of tyrant species into blood bath sinking.

Alive ever is the Hungarians' great God still,
Fear shall who against him attack will.
Even God is helping. Defeat us, who could?
Once free peoples we'd been, and anew we should.
