= Popovice (Uherské Hradiště District) =

- Municipality
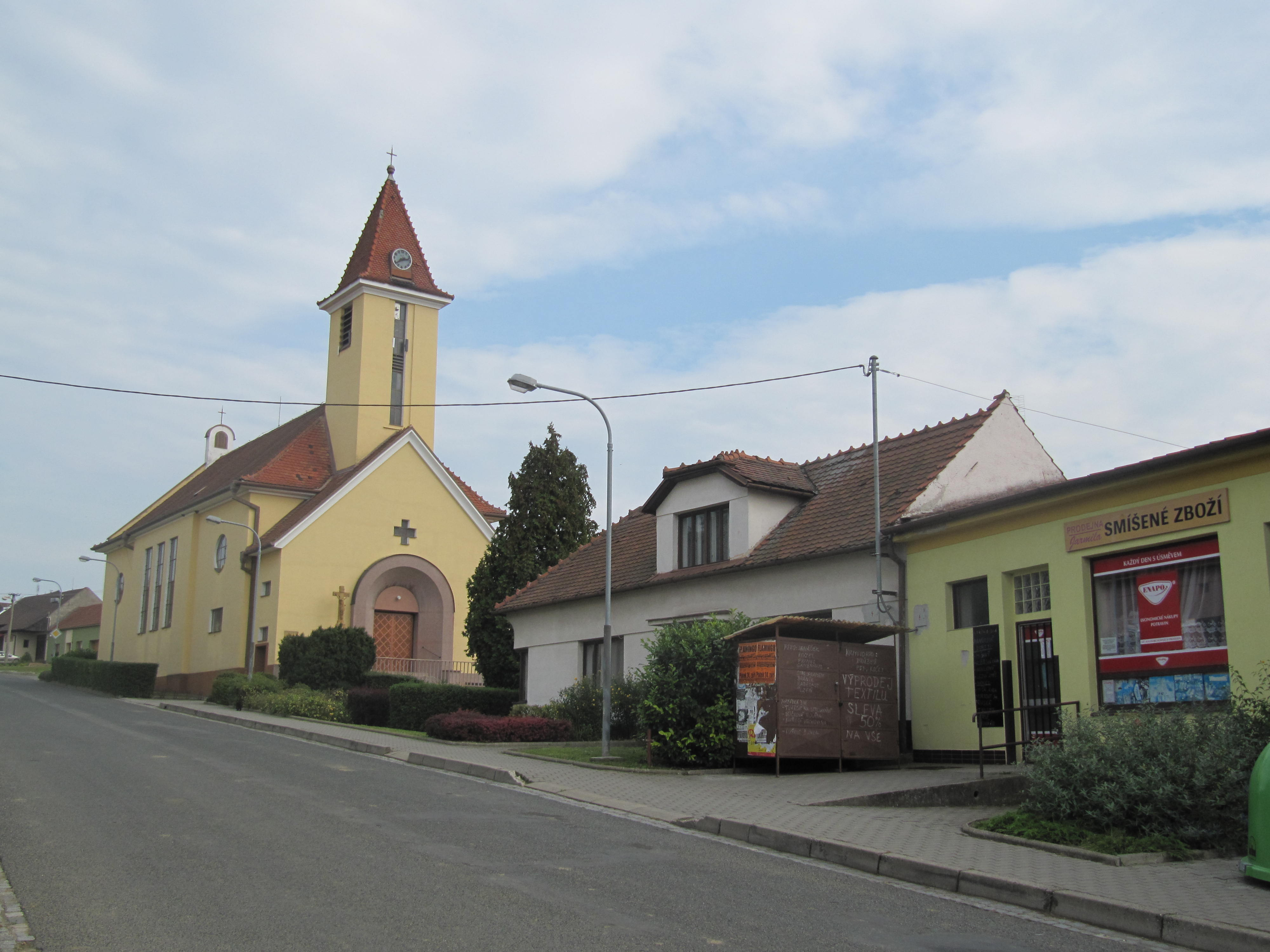
- Church of Our Lady of the Rosary

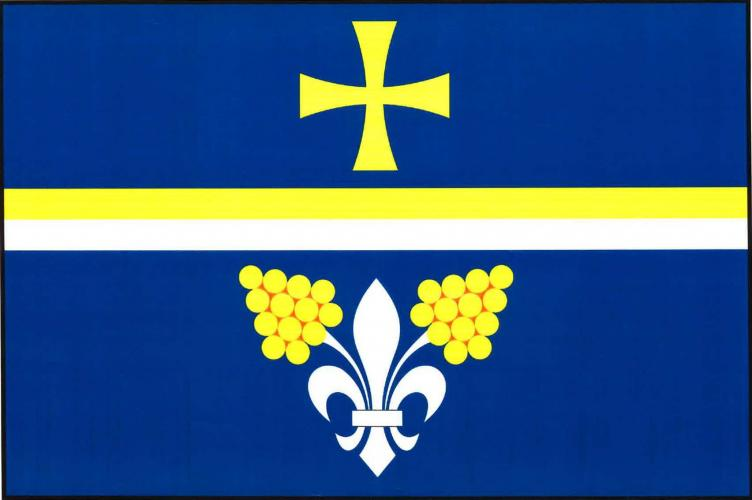
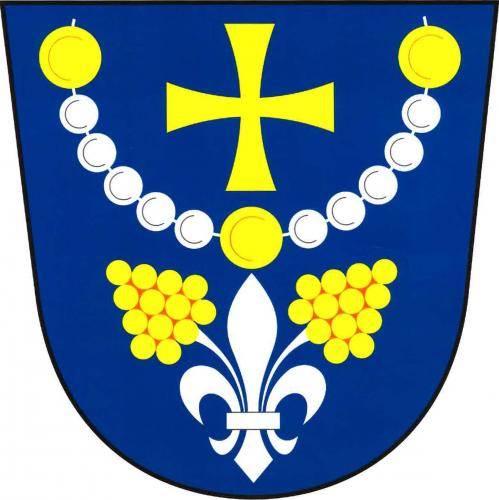
- Flag Coat of arms

- Location in the Czech Republic
- Coordinates: 49°3′9″N 17°31′38″E
- Country: Czech Republic
- Region: Zlín
- District: Uherské Hradiště
- First mentioned: 1220

Area
  - Total: 8.59 km^{2} (3.32 sq mi)
- Elevation: 263 m (863 ft)

Population (2026-01-01)
  - Total: 994
  - Density: 116/km^{2} (300/sq mi)
- Time zone: UTC+1 (CET)
  - Summer (DST): UTC+2 (CEST)
- Postal code: 686 04
- Website: www.popovice.cz

Popovice is a municipality and village in Uherské Hradiště District in the Zlín Region of the Czech Republic. It has about 1,000 inhabitants.

Popovice lies approximately 6 kilometres (4 mi) east of Uherské Hradiště, 23 km (14 mi) south-west of Zlín, and 253 km (157 mi) south-east of Prague.

== Demographics ==
Historical population
Year	Pop.	±%
1869	626	—
1880	704	+12.5%
1890	715	+1.6%
1900	842	+17.8%
1910	1,025	+21.7%
1921	1,024	−0.1%
1930	1,042	+1.8%
1950	1,107	+6.2%
1961	1,319	+19.2%
1970	1,247	−5.5%
1980	1,144	−8.3%
1991	1,097	−4.1%
2001	1,070	−2.5%
2011	1,017	−5.0%
2021	997	−2.0%
Source: Censuses

== Twin towns – sister cities ==
Popovice is twinned with:

- Kálnica, Slovakia
