= Karolinka =

- Town
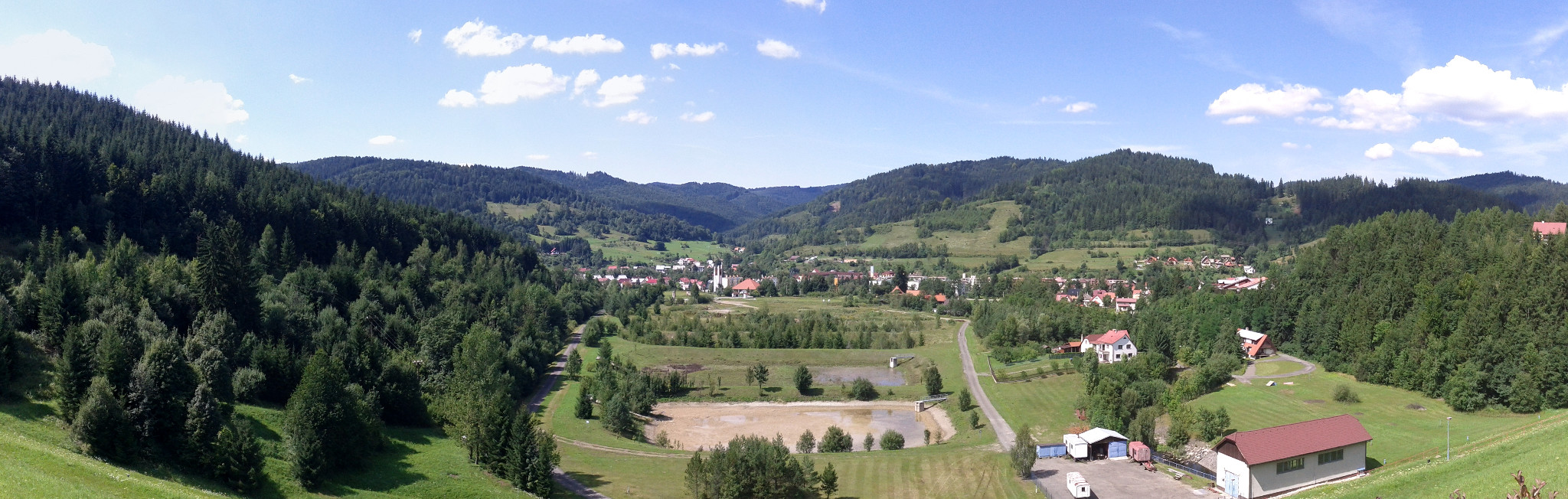
- Panorama of Karolinka

- Flag Coat of arms

- Location in the Czech Republic
- Coordinates: 49°21′20″N 18°14′40″E
- Country: Czech Republic
- Region: Zlín
- District: Vsetín
- Founded: 1861

Government
  - Mayor: Richard Holiš

Area
  - Total: 42.31 km^{2} (16.34 sq mi)
- Elevation: 483 m (1,585 ft)

Population (2026-01-01)
  - Total: 2,340
  - Density: 55.3/km^{2} (143/sq mi)
- Time zone: UTC+1 (CET)
  - Summer (DST): UTC+2 (CEST)
- Postal code: 756 05
- Website: www.karolinka.cz

Karolinka (Czech pronunciation: [ˈkarolɪŋka]; until 1951 Karolinina Huť; German: Charlottenhütte) is a town in Vsetín District in the Zlín Region of the Czech Republic. It has about 2,300 inhabitants.

== Etymology ==
The name is a Czech diminutive form of the given name Karolina. It was derived from given name of stepmother of its founder, Jewish entrepreneur Salomon Reich. Until 1951, its name was Karolinina Huť, meaning "Karolina's glassworks".

== Geography ==
Karolinka is located about 17 kilometres (11 mi) east of Vsetín and 38 km (24 mi) northwest of Žilina in Slovakia. It borders Slovakia in the south. It lies on the border between the Hostýn-Vsetín Mountains and Maple Mountains. The highest point is the Malý Javorník mountain at 1,019 m (3,343 ft) above sea level, which top is on the Czech–Slovak border. The town proper is situated in the valley of the Vsetínská Bečva river. A notable body of water is the Karolinka Reservoir. The whole territory of Karolinka lies in the Beskydy Protected Landscape Area.

== History ==
The settlement grew up around a glass factory established on the territory of Nový Hrozenkov municipality in 1861. Karolinina Huť was separated as a municipality of its own from Nový Hrozenkov in 1949. In 1951, it was renamed Karolinka.

== Demographics ==
Historical population

Year	Pop.	±%
1869	–	—
1880	556	—
1890	623	+12.1%
1900	1,612	+158.7%
1910	2,024	+25.6%

Year	Pop.	±%
1921	2,039	+0.7%
1930	2,113	+3.6%
1950	2,136	+1.1%
1961	2,488	+16.5%
1970	2,652	+6.6%

Year	Pop.	±%
1980	2,862	+7.9%
1991	2,959	+3.4%
2001	2,894	−2.2%
2011	2,680	−7.4%
2021	2,458	−8.3%

Source: Censuses

== Transport ==
Karolinka is located on the railway line Vsetín–Velké Karlovice.

== Sights ==
The main landmark of Karolinka is the Church of Our Lady of Carmel. It is a modern church built in 1994–1997.

== Twin towns – sister cities ==
Karolinka is twinned with:

- Bytča, Slovakia
- Papradno, Slovakia
- Vysoká nad Kysucou, Slovakia
