= Nitrianske Sučany =

- Municipality
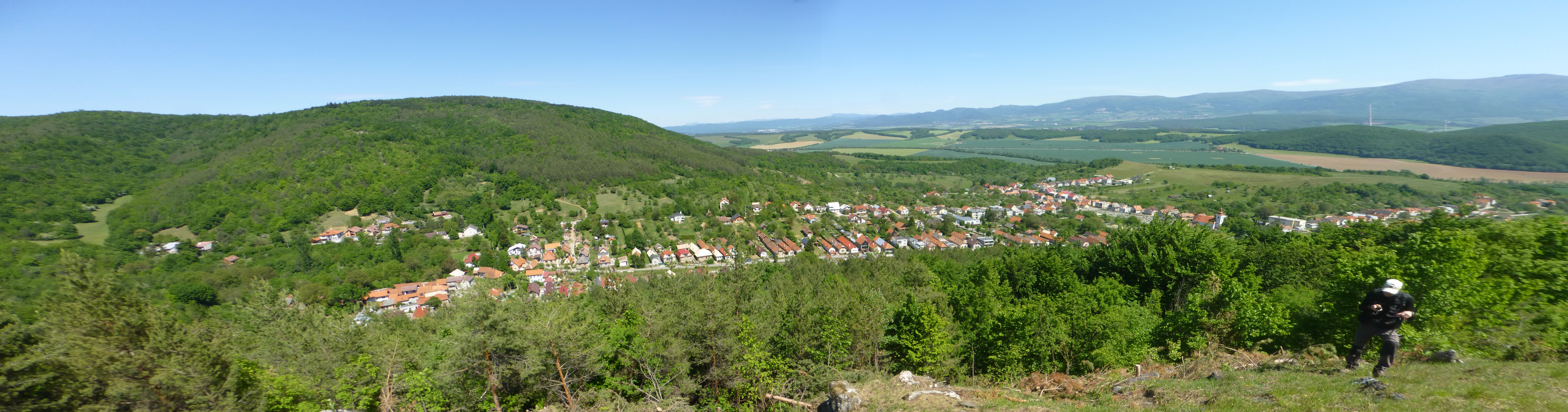

- Flag

- Location of Nitrianske Sučany in the Trenčín Region Location of Nitrianske Sučany in Slovakia
- Coordinates: 48.73°N 18.47°E
- Country: Slovakia
- Region: Trenčín Region
- District: Prievidza District
- First mentioned: 1249

Area
  - Total: 18.06 km^{2} (6.97 sq mi)
- Elevation: 297 m (974 ft)

Population (2025)
  - Total: 1,189
- Time zone: UTC+1 (CET)
  - Summer (DST): UTC+2 (CEST)
- Postal code: 972 21
- Area code: +421 46
- Vehicle registration plate (until 2022): PD
- Website: www.nitrianskesucany.sk

Nitrianske Sučany (Slovak pronunciation: [ˈɲitrɪɐnske ˈsutʂani]; Hungarian: Nyitraszucsány) is a village and municipality in Prievidza District in the Trenčín Region of western Slovakia.

== History ==
In historical records the village was first mentioned in 1249.

== Geography ==
The municipality lies at an altitude of 297 metres (974 ft) and covers an area of 18.06 km^{2} (6.97 sq mi) (2025).

== Population ==
Population statistic (10 years)
Year	1995	2005	2015	2025
Count	1202	1242	1210	1189
Difference		+3.32%	−2.57%	−1.73%

Population statistic
Year	2024	2025
Count	1202	1189
Difference		−1.08%

It has a population of 1189 people (31 December 2025).

=== Ethnicity ===
Census 2021 (1+ %)
Ethnicity	Number	Fraction
Slovak	1175	98.9%
Not found out	13	1.09%
Total	1188	

In year 2021 was 1188 people by ethnicity 1175 as Slovak, 13 as Not found out, 5 as Other, 3 as Czech, 2 as German, 2 as English, 1 as Italian, 1 as Russian, 1 as Polish, 1 as Hungarian and 1 as Bulgarian.

Note on population: The difference values of population numbers in the table "Population statistic" and in the sections "Ethnicity" & "Religion" is caused by the use of various statistical methods.

=== Religion ===
Census 2021 (1+ %)
Religion	Number	Fraction
Roman Catholic Church	917	77.19%
None	227	19.11%
Not found out	12	1.01%
Total	1188	

In year 2021 was 1188 people by religion 917 from Roman Catholic Church, 227 from None, 12 from Not found out, 8 from Greek Catholic Church, 5 from Christian Congregations in Slovakia, 4 from Calvinist Church, 3 from Other, 3 from Evangelical Church, 2 from Eastern Orthodox Church, 2 from Jehovah's Witnesses, 2 from Ad hoc movements, 1 from Other and not ascertained christian church, 1 from Islam and 1 from Buddhism.

== Twin towns — sister cities ==
Nitrianske Sučany is twinned with:

- Bohdíkov, Czech Republic
