= Jurová =

Jurová Dercsika
- Municipality
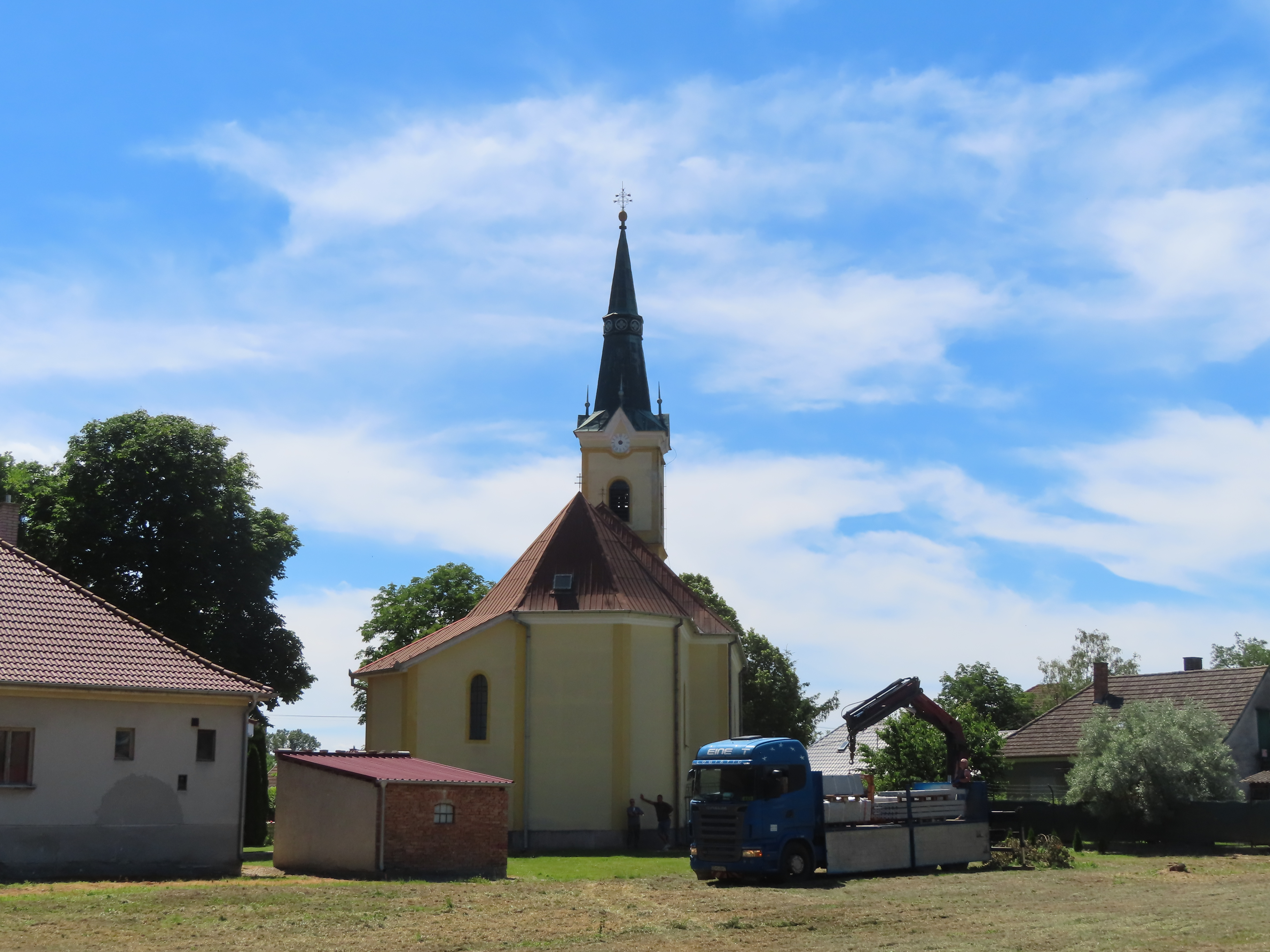

- Flag

- Location of Jurová in the Trnava Region Location of Jurová in Slovakia
- Coordinates: 47.93°N 17.52°E
- Country: Slovakia
- Region: Trnava Region
- District: Dunajská Streda District
- First mentioned: 1253

Government
  - Mayor: Ladislav Matuška (Most-Hid)

Area
  - Total: 10.73 km^{2} (4.14 sq mi)
- Elevation: 116 m (381 ft)

Population (2025)
  - Total: 476

Ethnicity
  - Hungarians: 94,12 %
  - Slovaks: 5,20 %
- Time zone: UTC+1 (CET)
  - Summer (DST): UTC+2 (CEST)
- Postal code: 930 04
- Area code: +421 31
- Vehicle registration plate (until 2022): DS
- Website: jurova.sk

Jurová (Hungarian: Dercsika, pronounced [ˈdɛrtʃikɒ]) is a village and municipality in the Dunajská Streda District in the Trnava Region of south-west Slovakia.

== Geography ==
The municipality lies at an altitude of 116 metres (381 ft) and covers an area of 10.73 km^{2} (4.14 sq mi) (2025).

== History ==
In the 9th century, the territory of Gabčíkovo became part of the Great Moravia. In historical records the village was first mentioned in 1253. Until the end of World War I, it was part of Hungary and fell within the Dunaszerdahely district of Pozsony County. After the Austro-Hungarian army disintegrated in November 1918, Czechoslovak troops occupied the area. After the Treaty of Trianon of 1920, the village became officially part of Czechoslovakia. In November 1938, the First Vienna Award granted the area to Hungary and it was held by Hungary until 1945. After Soviet occupation in 1945, Czechoslovak administration returned and the village became officially part of Czechoslovakia in 1947.

== Population ==
Population statistic (10 years)
Year	1995	2005	2015	2025
Count	432	440	481	476
Difference		+1.85%	+9.31%	−1.03%

Population statistic
Year	2024	2025
Count	482	476
Difference		−1.24%

It has a population of 476 people (31 December 2025).

=== Ethnicity ===
Census 2021 (1+ %)
Ethnicity	Number	Fraction
Hungarian	409	85.2%
Slovak	74	15.41%
Not found out	19	3.95%
Total	480	

In year 2021 was 480 people by ethnicity 409 as Hungarian, 74 as Slovak, 19 as Not found out, 3 as Czech, 1 as Irish, 1 as Ukrainian, 1 as Silesian, 1 as Rusyn and 1 as Russian.

Note on population: The difference values of population numbers in the table "Population statistic" and in the sections "Ethnicity" & "Religion" is caused by the use of various statistical methods.

=== Religion ===
Census 2021 (1+ %)
Religion	Number	Fraction
Roman Catholic Church	377	78.54%
None	68	14.17%
Calvinist Church	12	2.5%
Not found out	10	2.08%
Greek Catholic Church	7	1.46%
Total	480	

In year 2021 was 480 people by religion 377 from Roman Catholic Church, 68 from None, 12 from Calvinist Church, 10 from Not found out, 7 from Greek Catholic Church, 4 from Evangelical Church, 1 from Eastern Orthodox Church and 1 from Christian Congregations in Slovakia.

At the 2001 Census the recorded population of the village was 442 while an end-2008 estimate by the Statistical Office had the villages's population as 462. As of 2001, 94.12% of its population was Hungarians and 5.20% Slovaks. Roman Catholicism is the majority religion of the village, its adherents numbering 96.80% of the total population.

== Twin towns – sister cities ==
Jurová is twinned with:

- Andocs, Hungary

== See also ==
- List of municipalities and towns in Slovakia

== Genealogical resources ==
The records for genealogical research are available at the state archive "Statny Archiv in Bratislava, Slovakia"

- Roman Catholic church records (births/marriages/deaths): 1728-1912 (parish A)
- Lutheran church records (births/marriages/deaths): 1823-1946 (parish B)
