= Úsov =

Town in Olomouc Region, Czech Republic

- Town
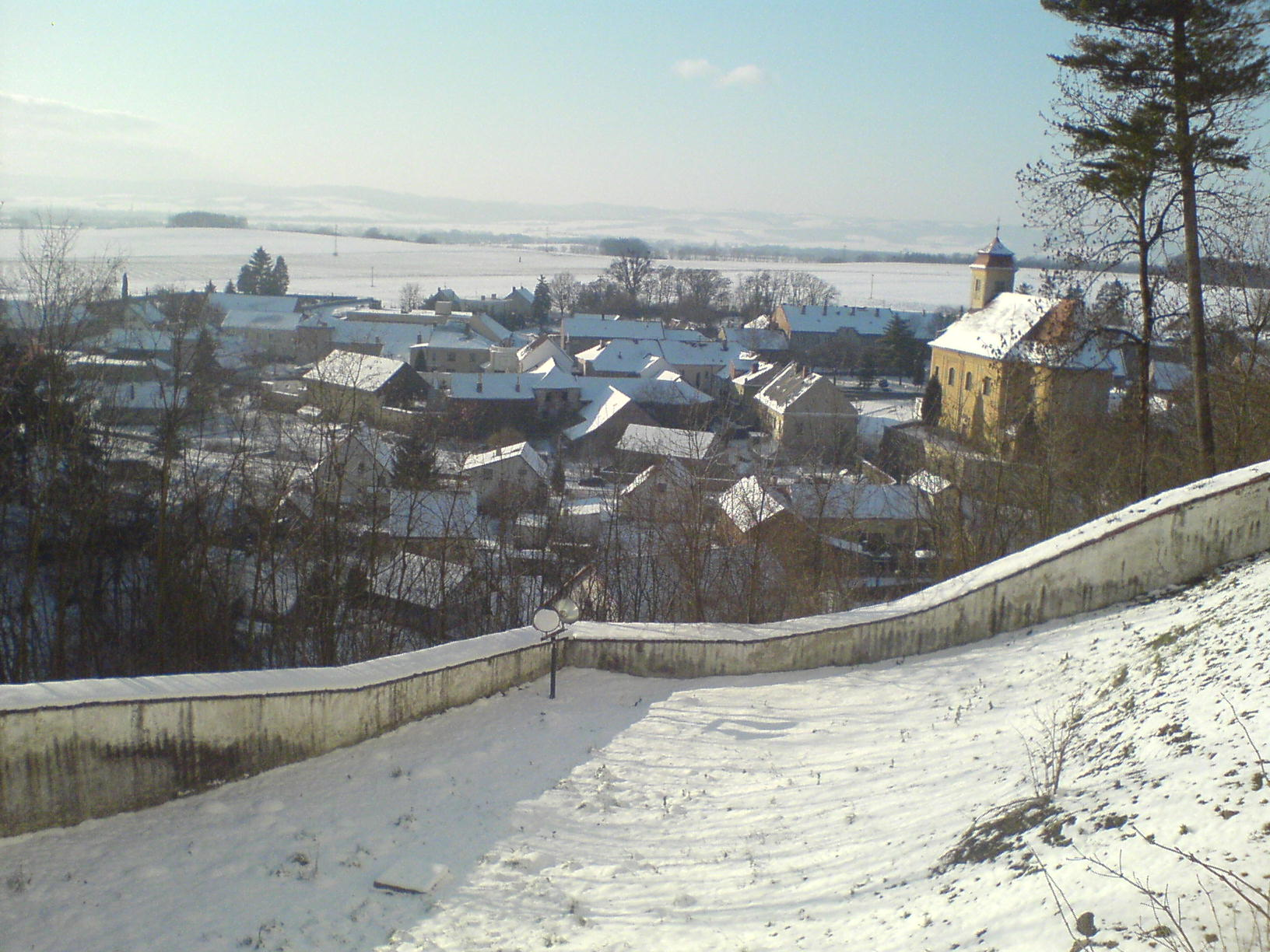
- Úsov as seen from the Úsov Castle

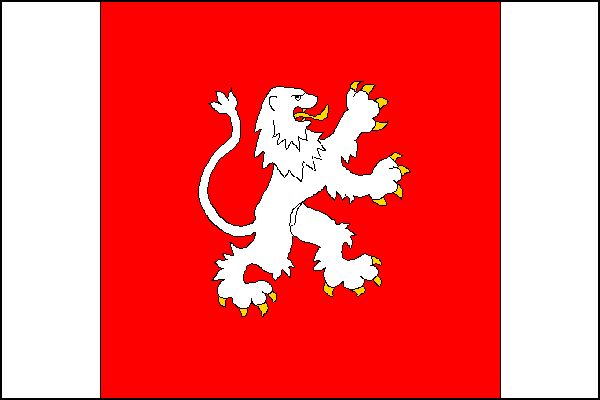
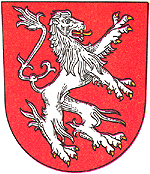
- Flag Coat of arms

- Location in the Czech Republic
- Coordinates: 49°47′54″N 17°0′38″E
- Country: Czech Republic
- Region: Olomouc
- District: Šumperk
- First mentioned: 1260

Government
  - Mayor: Benedikt Lavrinčík

Area
  - Total: 9.31 km^{2} (3.59 sq mi)
- Elevation: 280 m (920 ft)

Population (2026-01-01)
  - Total: 1,162
  - Density: 125/km^{2} (323/sq mi)
- Time zone: UTC+1 (CET)
  - Summer (DST): UTC+2 (CEST)
- Postal code: 789 73
- Website: www.usov.cz

Úsov (Czech pronunciation: [ˈuːsof]; German: Mährisch Aussee) is a town in Šumperk District in the Olomouc Region of the Czech Republic. It has about 1,200 inhabitants.

== Administrative division ==
Úsov consists of two municipal parts (in brackets population according to the 2021 census):

- Úsov (1,015)
- Bezděkov u Úsova (72)

Bezděkov u Úsova forms an exclave of the municipal territory.

== Etymology ==
The name was probably derived from the personal name Ús. The personal name arose from the Old Czech word vús (in modern Czech vous), meaning 'beard'. The German name Aussee was created by transcription of the Czech name. In the first half of the 20th century, the name Mährisch Aussee ('Moravian Aussee') was used in German. The Jewish community called the town אויסא (Ojsa).

== Geography ==
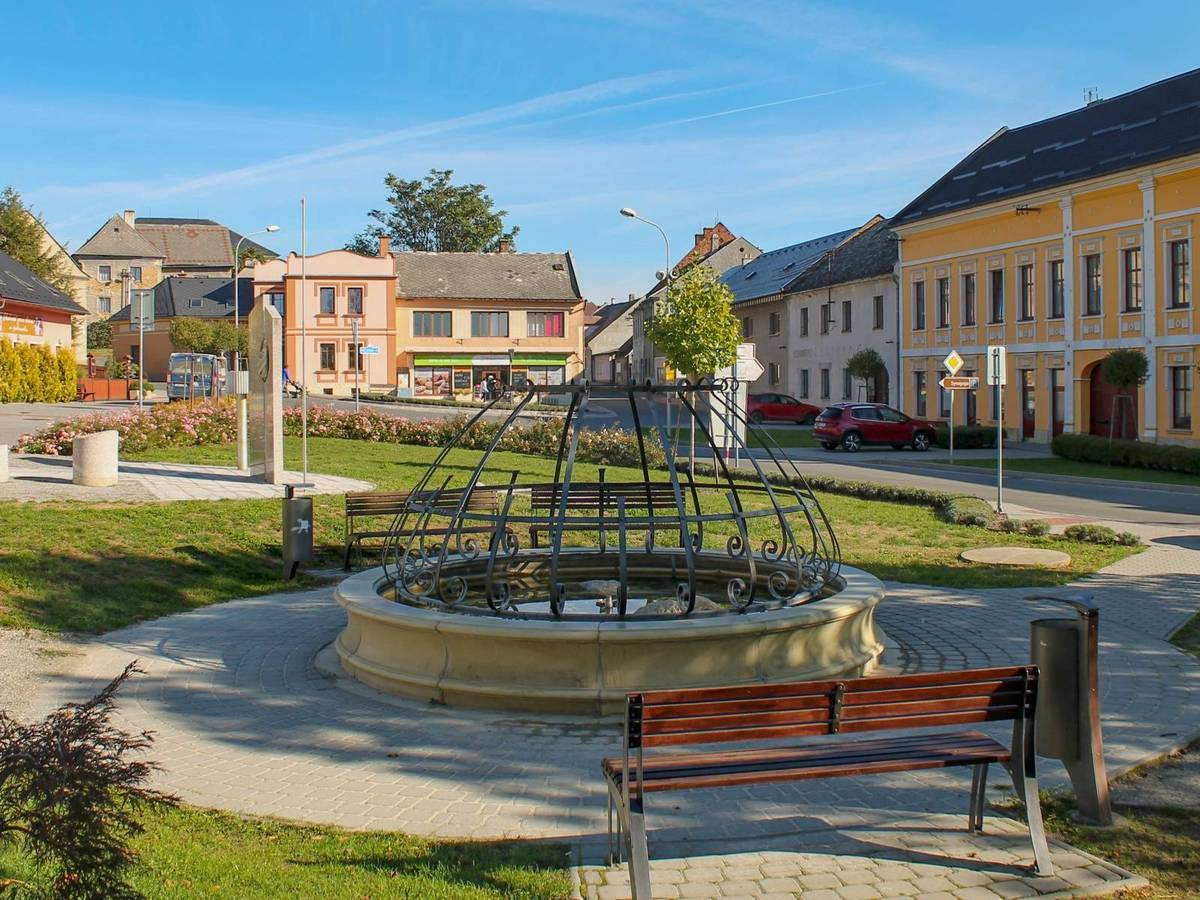
Town square

Úsov is located about 18 kilometres (11 mi) south of Šumperk and 28 km (17 mi) northwest of Olomouc. It lies in the Hanušovice Highlands. The highest point, located in the territory's exclave, is at 410 m (1,345 ft) above sea level. The Doubravka Stream flows through the town. The fishpond Polický rybník is situated northwest of the town.

== History ==
The first written mention of Úsov is from 1260. The castle was built around 1250. Before 1487 the Lords of Vlašim modified the castle. In the 16th century, Úsov was in the possession of the lords of Boskovice, and in 1597 it was acquired by the Liechtenstein family. The Liechtensteins owned the castle until 1945.

The castle was damaged during the Swedish occupation in 1643. During the rule by Prince Hans-Adam I of Liechtenstein, in 1692–1699, it was reconstructed and partially rebuilt into a large three-storey Baroque residence, designed by Domenico Martinelli.

In 1852, the Moravian-Silesian Silviculture School was founded in Úsov, which operated here until 1867. It was one of the oldest high schools in Moravia.

In 1860, there were 245 houses in Úsov with 2,662 inhabitants, of whom 950 were Jewish.

=== Jewish community ===
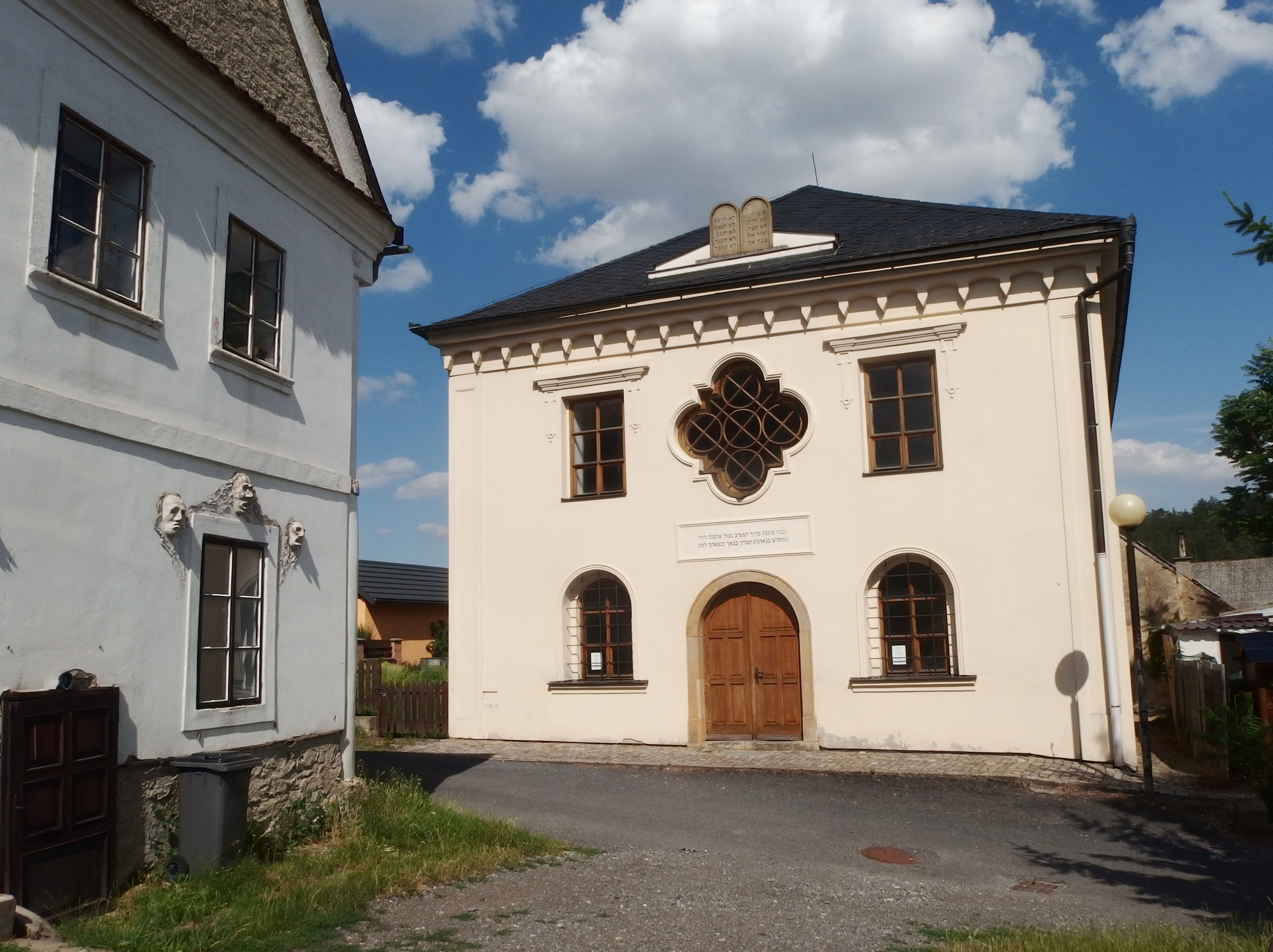
Former synagogue

Presence of the Jews in the town was first documented in 1564. The Jewish quarter was established in 1589. In 1609, the community warranted its first rabbi. However, in 1643, the developing community was affected by the invasion of Swedish troops, which caused many loss of life.

Around 1645, the cemetery was established. The synagogue destroyed during the war was replaced by a new one in 1688. In the late 17th century, the community lived under the protection of Prince of Liechtenstein, and in the 1700s, the number of families reached 110. As a result of antisemitic tensions, a conflict ensued in 1721 and the synagogue had to be demolished in 1722.

The third synagogue was built in 1783–1784. Due to the constantly declining population, the local Jewish community was amalgamated with the neighbouring communities in 1890. Šumperk became the seat of the Jewish religious congregation. The synagogue was used until 1938, when the interior was demolished during the Kristallnacht. The Jewish community disappeared during World War II as a result of the Holocaust.

== Demographics ==
Historical population

Year	Pop.	±%
1869	2,118	—
1880	2,182	+3.0%
1890	2,091	−4.2%
1900	1,938	−7.3%
1910	1,799	−7.2%

Year	Pop.	±%
1921	1,773	−1.4%
1930	1,662	−6.3%
1950	1,053	−36.6%
1961	1,231	+16.9%
1970	1,171	−4.9%

Year	Pop.	±%
1980	1,151	−1.7%
1991	1,167	+1.4%
2001	1,196	+2.5%
2011	1,183	−1.1%
2021	1,087	−8.1%

Source: Censuses

== Transport ==
There are no railways or major roads passing through the municipality.

== Sights ==
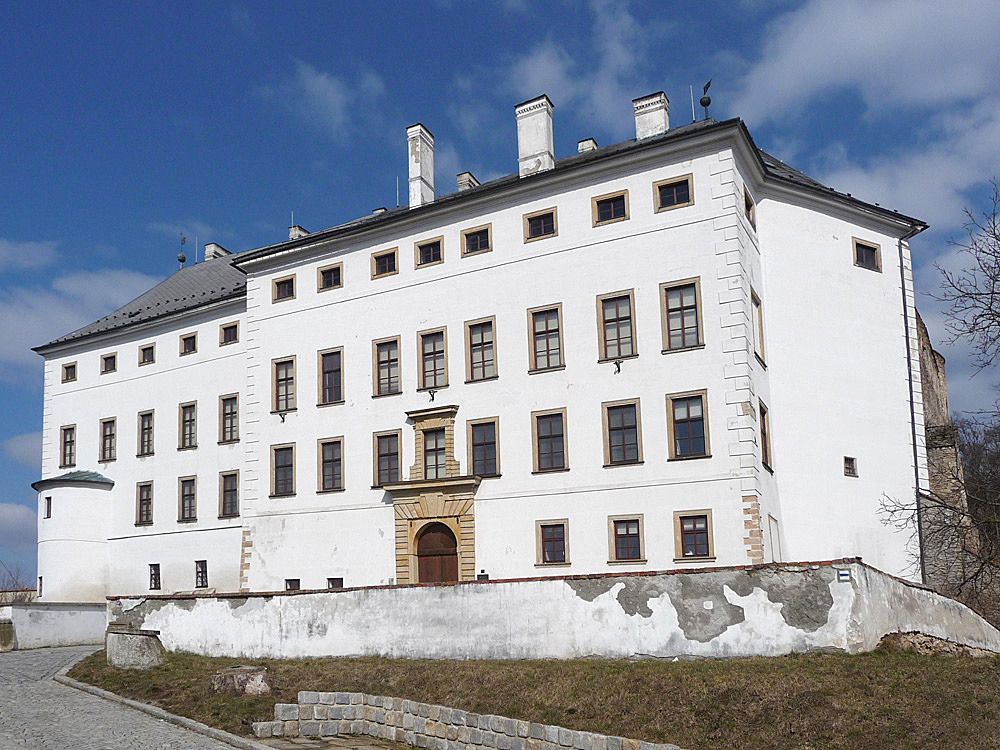
Úsov Castle

The castle houses a museum, which was founded here by Prince Johann II of Liechtenstein in 1898. The Hunting and Forestry Museum contains a unique collection of trophies from Liechtenstein expeditions from around the world. There is about 10,000 exhibits and it is the largest museum of its kind in Central Europe.

The Church of Saint Giles was built in the Baroque style in 1736. Behind the church is a Baroque granary from the late 18th century.

The building of the former synagogue is repaired and contains a museum exhibition. Near the synagogue is the Jewish cemetery. The cemetery contains about 500 tombstones and the oldest readable is from 1745.

== Twin towns – sister cities ==
Úsov is twinned with:

- Lazany, Slovakia
