= Andovce =

Andovce Andód
- Municipality
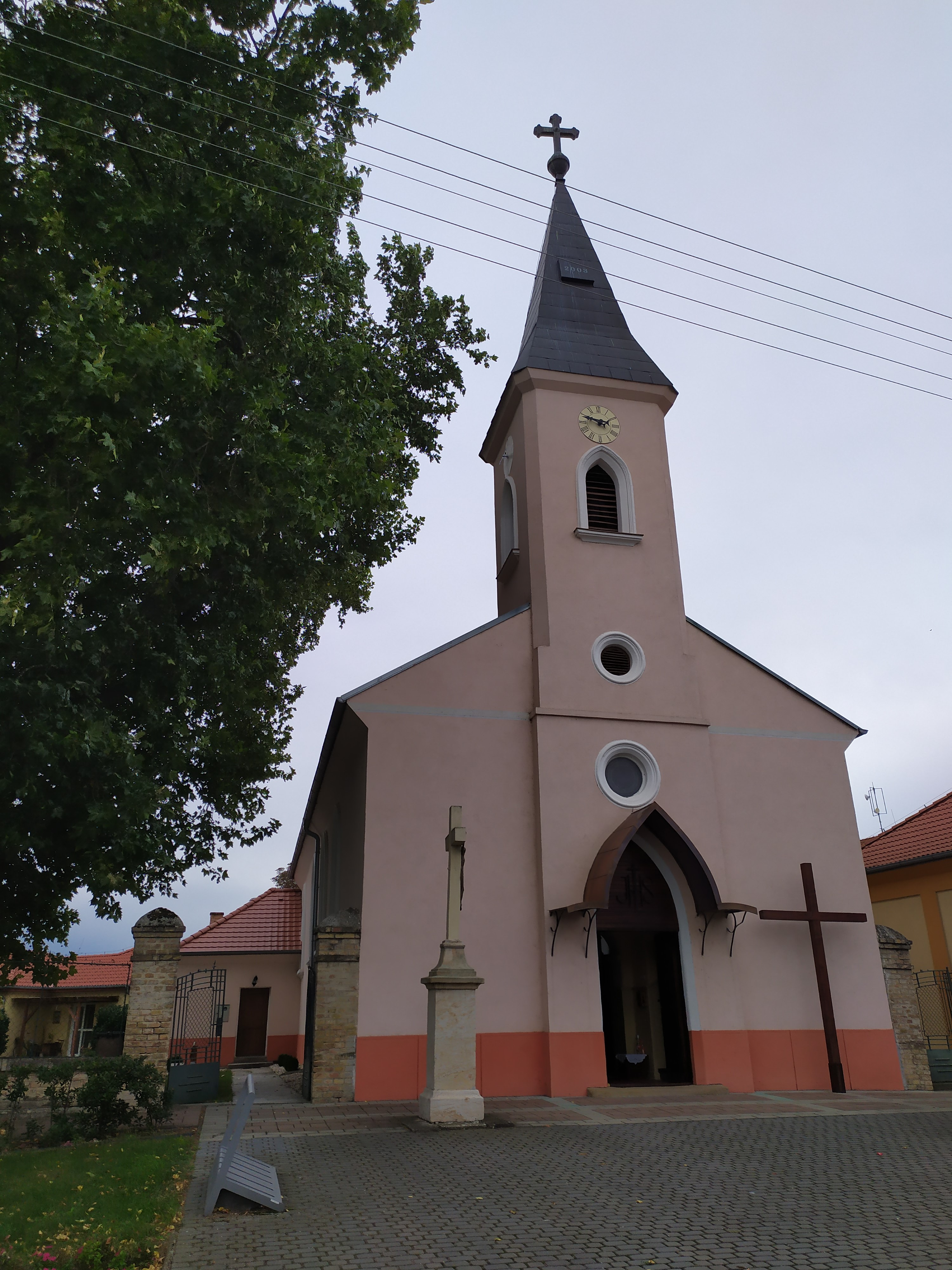

- Flag

- Location of Andovce in the Nitra Region Location of Andovce in Slovakia
- Coordinates: 47.99°N 18.11°E
- Country: Slovakia
- Region: Nitra Region
- District: Nové Zámky District
- First mentioned: 1424

Area
  - Total: 10.77 km^{2} (4.16 sq mi)
- Elevation: 112 m (367 ft)

Population (2025)
  - Total: 1,837
- Time zone: UTC+1 (CET)
  - Summer (DST): UTC+2 (CEST)
- Postal code: 941 23
- Area code: +421 35
- Vehicle registration plate (until 2022): NZ
- Website: www.andovce.sk/sk

Andovce (Hungarian: Andód) is a municipality and village in the Nové Zámky District of the south-west of Slovakia, in the Nitra Region.

== History ==
In historical records the village was first mentioned in 1424.

== Geography ==
The municipality lies at an altitude of 112 metres (367 ft) and covers an area of 10.77 km^{2} (4.16 sq mi) (2025).

== Population ==
Population statistic (10 years)
Year	1995	2005	2015	2025
Count	1227	1292	1418	1837
Difference		+5.29%	+9.75%	+29.54%

Population statistic
Year	2024	2025
Count	1792	1837
Difference		+2.51%

It has a population of 1837 people (31 December 2025).

=== Ethnicity ===
Census 2021 (1+ %)
Ethnicity	Number	Fraction
Slovak	872	53.72%
Hungarian	749	46.14%
Not found out	105	6.46%
Total	1623	

In year 2021 was 1623 people by ethnicity 872 as Slovak, 749 as Hungarian, 105 as Not found out, 6 as Czech, 4 as Other, 3 as English, 1 as Romani, 1 as Russian and 1 as Canadian.

Note on population: The difference values of population numbers in the table "Population statistic" and in the sections "Ethnicity" & "Religion" is caused by the use of various statistical methods.

=== Religion ===
Census 2021 (1+ %)
Religion	Number	Fraction
Roman Catholic Church	937	57.73%
None	471	29.02%
Not found out	119	7.33%
Evangelical Church	36	2.22%
Total	1623	

In year 2021 was 1623 people by religion 937 from Roman Catholic Church, 471 from None, 119 from Not found out, 36 from Evangelical Church, 16 from Calvinist Church, 8 from Greek Catholic Church, 6 from Eastern Orthodox Church, 6 from Apostolic Church, 5 from Other and not ascertained christian church, 4 from Christian Congregations in Slovakia, 4 from Buddhism, 3 from Jehovah's Witnesses, 3 from Ad hoc movements, 1 from Old Catholic Church, 1 from Paganism and natural spirituality, 1 from Islam, 1 from Other and 1 from Seventh-day Adventist Church.

== People ==
- Gergely Czuczor
- Tatiana Vitko

== Genealogical resources ==
The records for genealogical research are available at the state archive Nitra (Slovak: Štátny archív v Nitre).

- Roman Catholic church records (births/marriages/deaths): 1792-1895
- Census records 1869 of Andovce are available at the state archive.

== See also ==
- List of municipalities and towns in Slovakia
