= Rejdová =

Village and municipality in Slovakia

Rejdová Neuhaus
- Municipality
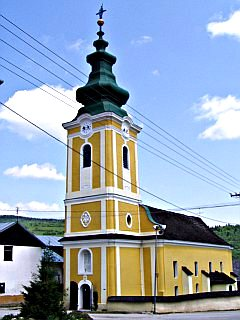

- Flag Coat of arms

- Location of Rejdová in the Košice Region Location of Rejdová in Slovakia
- Coordinates: 48.78°N 20.28°E
- Country: Slovakia
- Region: Košice Region
- District: Rožňava District
- First mentioned: 1551

Area
  - Total: 50.51 km^{2} (19.50 sq mi)
- Elevation: 579 m (1,900 ft)

Population (2025)
  - Total: 722
- Time zone: UTC+1 (CET)
  - Summer (DST): UTC+2 (CEST)
- Postal code: 492 6
- Area code: +421 58
- Vehicle registration plate (until 2022): RV
- Website: www.rejdova.sk

Rejdová (German: Neuhaus; Hungarian: Sajóréde) is a village and large municipality in the Rožňava District in the Košice Region of middle-eastern Slovakia.

== History ==
In historical records the village was first mentioned in 1551 as Bebek knights family's property. German miners came here in the past. Before the establishment of independent Czechoslovakia in 1918, Rejdová was part of Gömör and Kishont County within the Kingdom of Hungary. From 1939 to 1945, it was part of the Slovak Republic.

== Geography ==
The municipality lies at an altitude of 579 metres (1,900 ft) and covers an area of 50.51 km^{2} (19.50 sq mi) (2025).

== Population ==
Population statistic (10 years)
Year	1995	2005	2015	2025
Count	646	735	768	722
Difference		+13.77%	+4.48%	−5.98%

Population statistic
Year	2024	2025
Count	721	722
Difference		+0.13%

It has a population of 722 people (31 December 2025).

=== Ethnicity ===
Census 2021 (1+ %)
Ethnicity	Number	Fraction
Slovak	712	96.21%
Romani	35	4.72%
Not found out	9	1.21%
Total	740	

In year 2021 was 740 people by ethnicity 712 as Slovak, 35 as Romani, 9 as Not found out, 4 as Hungarian, 1 as Rusyn and 1 as Other.

Note on population: The difference values of population numbers in the table "Population statistic" and in the sections "Ethnicity" & "Religion" is caused by the use of various statistical methods.

=== Religion ===
Census 2021 (1+ %)
Religion	Number	Fraction
Evangelical Church	377	50.95%
None	303	40.95%
Roman Catholic Church	38	5.14%
Greek Catholic Church	9	1.22%
Total	740	

In year 2021 was 740 people by religion 377 from Evangelical Church, 303 from None, 38 from Roman Catholic Church, 9 from Greek Catholic Church, 5 from Not found out, 3 from United Methodist Church, 2 from Eastern Orthodox Church, 1 from Calvinist Church, 1 from Christian Congregations in Slovakia and 1 from Other.

== Culture ==
The village has a public library a gymnasium and a football pitch.
