= Bohdíkov =

- Municipality
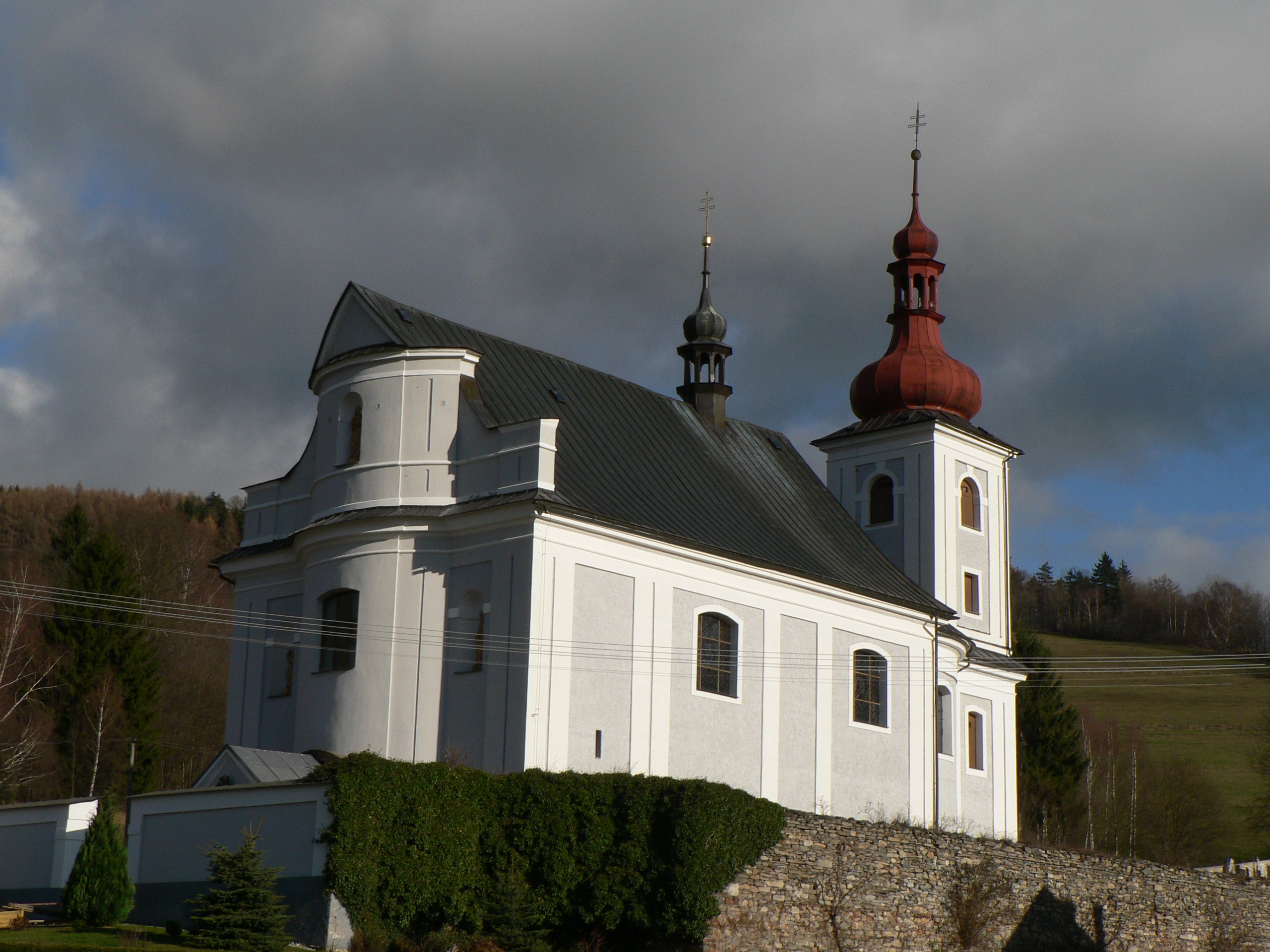
- Church of Saints Peter and Paul

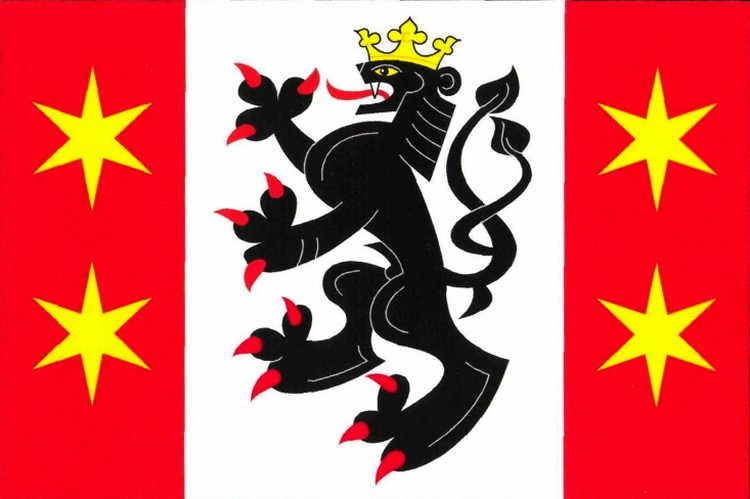
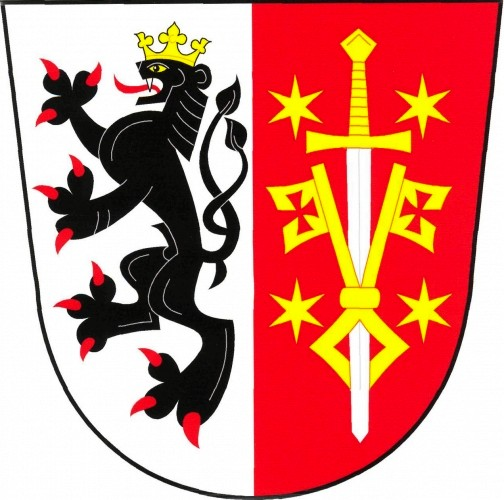
- Flag Coat of arms

- Location in the Czech Republic
- Coordinates: 50°0′36″N 16°54′16″E
- Country: Czech Republic
- Region: Olomouc
- District: Šumperk
- First mentioned: 1351

Area
  - Total: 26.22 km^{2} (10.12 sq mi)
- Elevation: 348 m (1,142 ft)

Population (2026-01-01)
  - Total: 1,262
  - Density: 48.13/km^{2} (124.7/sq mi)
- Time zone: UTC+1 (CET)
  - Summer (DST): UTC+2 (CEST)
- Postal code: 789 64
- Website: obecbohdikov.cz

Bohdíkov (until 1947 Český Bohdíkov; German: Böhmisch Märzdorf) is a municipality and village in Šumperk District in the Olomouc Region of the Czech Republic. It has about 1,300 inhabitants.

Bohdíkov lies approximately 9 kilometres (6 mi) north-west of Šumperk, 54 km (34 mi) north-west of Olomouc, and 178 km (111 mi) east of Prague.

== Administrative division ==
Bohdíkov consists of three municipal parts (in brackets population according to the 2021 census):

- Bohdíkov (691)
- Komňátka (136)
- Raškov (395)

== Demographics ==
Historical population
Year	Pop.	±%
1869	2,414	—
1880	2,514	+4.1%
1890	2,602	+3.5%
1900	2,680	+3.0%
1910	2,483	−7.4%
1921	2,278	−8.3%
1930	2,283	+0.2%
1950	1,633	−28.5%
1961	1,692	+3.6%
1970	1,577	−6.8%
1980	1,516	−3.9%
1991	1,395	−8.0%
2001	1,407	+0.9%
2011	1,358	−3.5%
2021	1,222	−10.0%
Source: Censuses

== Twin towns – sister cities ==
Bohdíkov is twinned with:

- Nitrianske Sučany, Slovakia
