= Papradno =

- Municipality
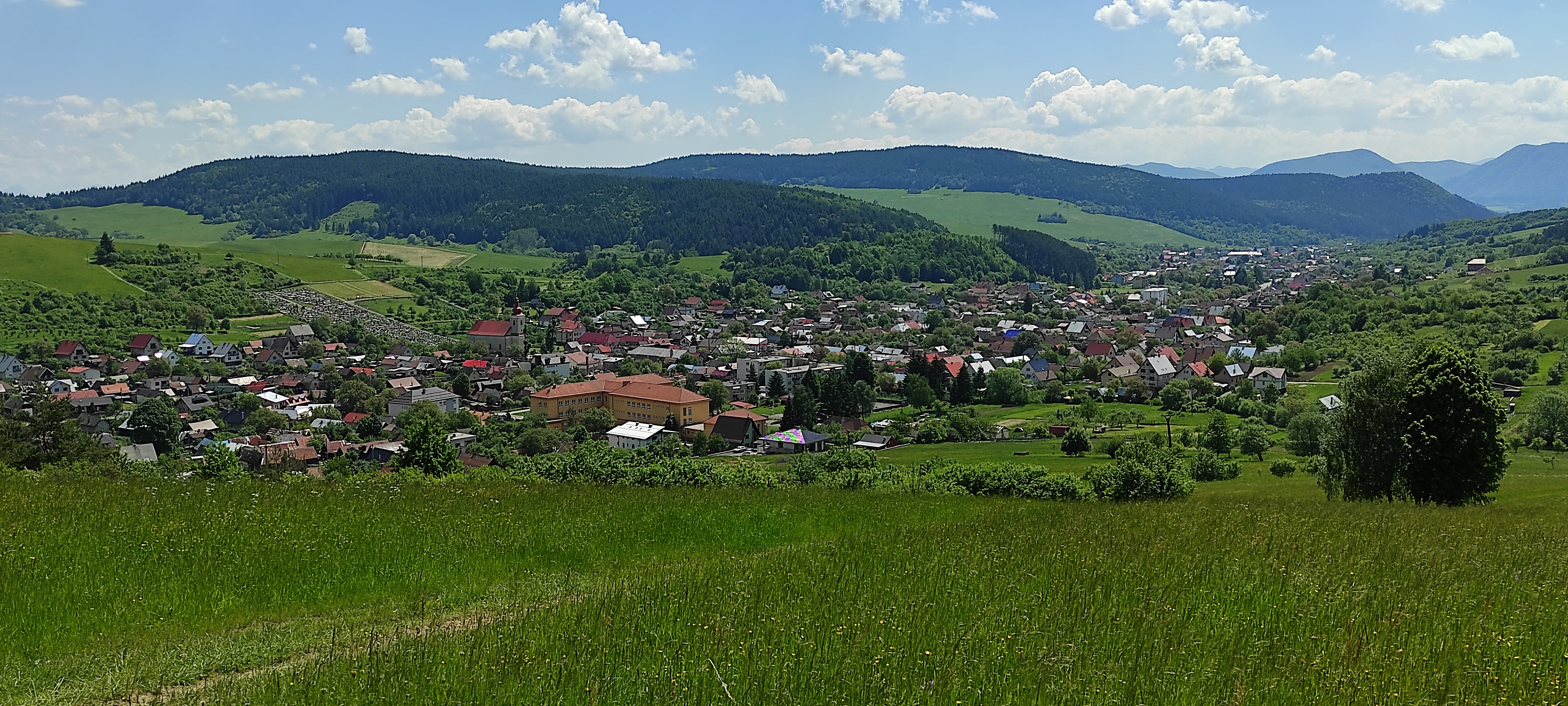

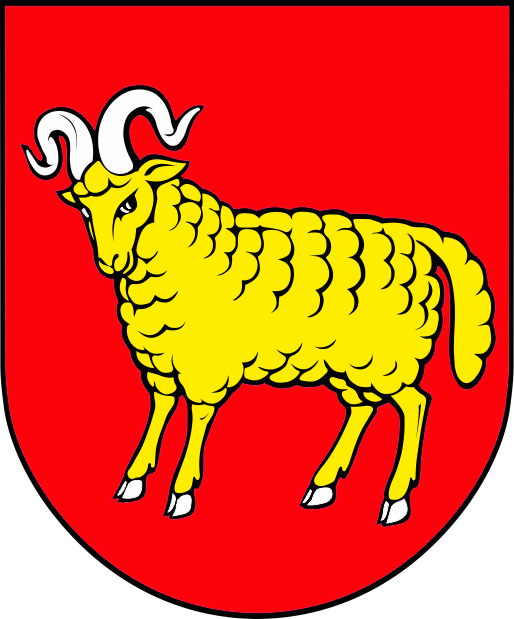
- Flag Coat of arms

- Location of Papradno in the Trenčín Region Location of Papradno in Slovakia
- Coordinates: 49.23°N 18.42°E
- Country: Slovakia
- Region: Trenčín Region
- District: Považská Bystrica District
- First mentioned: 1525

Government
  - Mayor: Ing. Roman Španihel

Area
  - Total: 55.81 km^{2} (21.55 sq mi)
- Elevation: 498 m (1,634 ft)

Population (2025)
  - Total: 2,373
- Time zone: UTC+1 (CET)
  - Summer (DST): UTC+2 (CEST)
- Postal code: 181 3
- Area code: +421 42
- Vehicle registration plate (until 2022): PB
- Website: www.papradno.sk

Papradno (Hungarian: Kosárfalva) is a village and municipality in Považská Bystrica District in the Trenčín Region of north-western Slovakia.

== History ==
In historical records, the village was first mentioned in 1525. In the past it belonged to the feudal dominion Bytča. Until 1918, the district was part of the Hungarian county of Trenčín.

== Geography ==
The municipality lies at an altitude of 498 metres (1,634 ft) and covers an area of 55.81 km^{2} (21.55 sq mi) (2025).

== Population ==
Population statistic (10 years)
Year	1995	2005	2015	2025
Count	2700	2538	2525	2373
Difference		−6%	−0.51%	−6.01%

Population statistic
Year	2024	2025
Count	2357	2373
Difference		+0.67%

It has a population of 2373 people (31 December 2025).

=== Ethnicity ===
Census 2021 (1+ %)
Ethnicity	Number	Fraction
Slovak	2322	96.46%
Not found out	75	3.11%
Total	2407	

In year 2021 was 2407 people by ethnicity 2322 as Slovak, 75 as Not found out, 12 as Czech, 6 as Russian, 3 as Romani, 3 as Other, 2 as Ukrainian, 2 as Romanian, 2 as Polish, 2 as Hungarian, 1 as Irish, 1 as Italian, 1 as Moravian and 1 as Bulgarian.

Note on population: The difference values of population numbers in the table "Population statistic" and in the sections "Ethnicity" & "Religion" is caused by the use of various statistical methods.

=== Religion ===
Census 2021 (1+ %)
Religion	Number	Fraction
Roman Catholic Church	1987	82.55%
None	277	11.51%
Not found out	86	3.57%
Total	2407	

In year 2021 was 2407 people by religion 1987 from Roman Catholic Church, 277 from None, 86 from Not found out, 17 from Other, 12 from Other and not ascertained christian church, 10 from Greek Catholic Church, 5 from Ad hoc movements, 3 from Eastern Orthodox Church, 2 from Christian Congregations in Slovakia, 2 from Islam, 1 from Calvinist Church, 1 from Paganism and natural spirituality, 1 from Jehovah's Witnesses, 1 from Hinduism, 1 from United Methodist Church and 1 from Evangelical Church.
