= Lazany, Slovakia =

Lazany
- Municipality
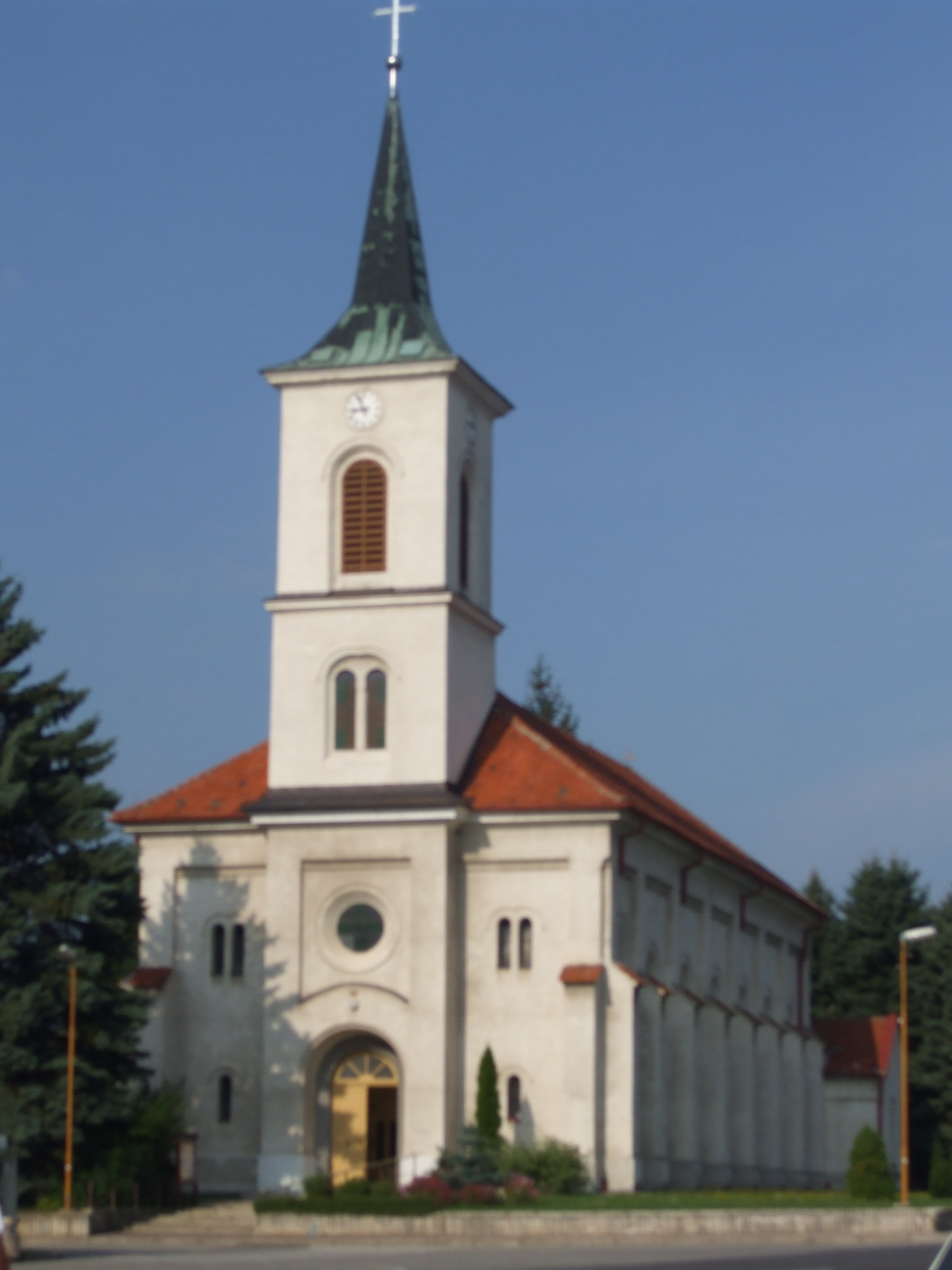

- Flag

- Location of Lazany in the Trenčín Region Location of Lazany in Slovakia
- Coordinates: 48°49′N 18°37′E
- Country: Slovakia
- Region: Trenčín Region
- District: Prievidza District
- First mentioned: 1430

Area
  - Total: 9.88 km^{2} (3.81 sq mi)
- Elevation: 313 m (1,027 ft)

Population (2025)
  - Total: 1,840
- Time zone: UTC+1 (CET)
  - Summer (DST): UTC+2 (CEST)
- Postal code: 972 11
- Area code: +421 46
- Vehicle registration plate (until 2022): PD
- Website: www.lazany.sk

Lazany (Hungarian: Bajmóclazán) is a village and municipality in Prievidza District in the Trenčín Region of western Slovakia.

== History ==
In historical records the village was first mentioned in 1430.

== Geography ==
The municipality lies at an altitude of 313 metres (1,027 ft) and covers an area of 9.88 km^{2} (3.81 sq mi) (2025).

== Population ==
Population statistic (10 years)
| Year | 1995 | 2005 | 2015 | 2025 |
|---|---|---|---|---|
| Count | 1390 | 1573 | 1682 | 1840 |
| Difference | | +13.16% | +6.92% | +9.39% |

Population statistic
| Year | 2024 | 2025 |
|---|---|---|
| Count | 1804 | 1840 |
| Difference | | +1.99% |

It has a population of 1840 people (31 December 2025).

=== Ethnicity ===
Census 2021 (1+ %)
| Ethnicity | Number | Fraction |
|---|---|---|
| Slovak | 1651 | 95.15% |
| Not found out | 74 | 4.26% |
| Total | 1735 | |

In year 2021 was 1735 people by ethnicity 1651 as Slovak, 74 as Not found out, 6 as Other, 5 as Czech, 4 as German, 3 as Romanian, 2 as Rusyn, 2 as Hungarian, 1 as Italian, 1 as Silesian, 1 as Russian, 1 as Moravian and 1 as Croatian.

Note on population: The difference values of population numbers in the table "Population statistic" and in the sections "Ethnicity" & "Religion" is caused by the use of various statistical methods.

=== Religion ===
Census 2021 (1+ %)
| Religion | Number | Fraction |
|---|---|---|
| Roman Catholic Church | 1161 | 66.92% |
| None | 432 | 24.9% |
| Not found out | 103 | 5.94% |
| Total | 1735 | |

In year 2021 was 1735 people by religion 1161 from Roman Catholic Church, 432 from None, 103 from Not found out, 9 from Christian Congregations in Slovakia, 6 from Other, 6 from Evangelical Church, 5 from Greek Catholic Church, 3 from Ad hoc movements, 2 from Eastern Orthodox Church, 2 from Other and not ascertained christian church, 2 from Hinduism, 1 from Calvinist Church, 1 from Paganism and natural spirituality, 1 from Buddhism and 1 from Apostolic Church.
