= Kálnica =

- Municipality
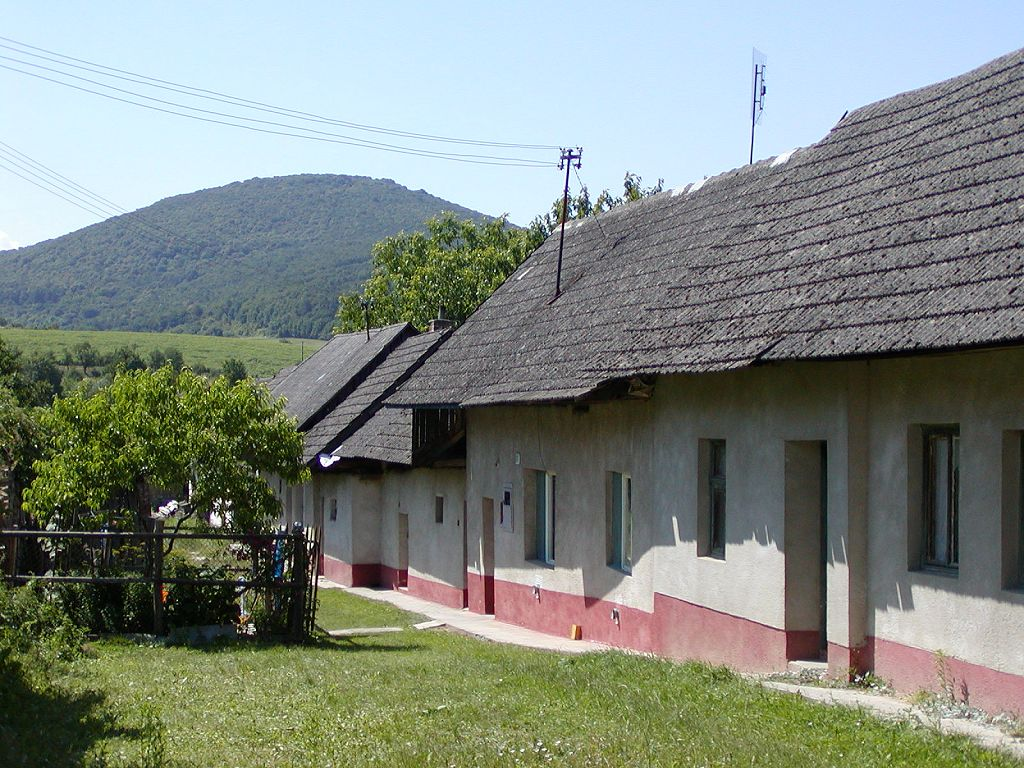

- Flag Coat of arms

- Location of Kálnica in the Trenčín Region Location of Kálnica in Slovakia
- Coordinates: 48.77°N 17.93°E
- Country: Slovakia
- Region: Trenčín Region
- District: Nové Mesto nad Váhom District
- First mentioned: 1396

Area
  - Total: 26.40 km^{2} (10.19 sq mi)
- Elevation: 223 m (732 ft)

Population (2025)
  - Total: 999
- Time zone: UTC+1 (CET)
  - Summer (DST): UTC+2 (CEST)
- Postal code: 916 37
- Area code: +421 32
- Vehicle registration plate (until 2022): NM
- Website: www.kalnica.sk

Kálnica (Hungarian: Kalános) is a village and municipality in Nové Mesto nad Váhom District in the Trenčín Region of western Slovakia.

== History ==
In historical records the village was first mentioned in 1396. Before the establishment of independent Czechoslovakia in 1918, Kálnica was part of Trencsén county within the Kingdom of Hungary. From 1939 to 1945, it was part of the Slovak Republic.

== Geography ==
The municipality lies at an altitude of 223 metres (732 ft) and covers an area of 26.40 km^{2} (10.19 sq mi) (2025).

== Population ==
Population statistic (10 years)
Year	1995	2005	2015	2025
Count	976	1041	1038	999
Difference		+6.65%	−0.28%	−3.75%

Population statistic
Year	2024	2025
Count	995	999
Difference		+0.40%

It has a population of 999 people (31 December 2025).

=== Ethnicity ===
Census 2021 (1+ %)
Ethnicity	Number	Fraction
Slovak	1007	98.33%
Not found out	14	1.36%
Total	1024	

In year 2021 was 1024 people by ethnicity 1007 as Slovak, 14 as Not found out, 3 as Czech, 3 as Other, 2 as German, 1 as Russian, 1 as Hungarian and 1 as Croatian.

Note on population: The difference values of population numbers in the table "Population statistic" and in the sections "Ethnicity" & "Religion" is caused by the use of various statistical methods.

=== Religion ===
Census 2021 (1+ %)
Religion	Number	Fraction
Evangelical Church	391	38.18%
Roman Catholic Church	298	29.1%
None	281	27.44%
Not found out	29	2.83%
Total	1024	

In year 2021 was 1024 people by religion 391 from Evangelical Church, 298 from Roman Catholic Church, 281 from None, 29 from Not found out, 6 from Paganism and natural spirituality, 5 from Other, 3 from Jehovah's Witnesses, 3 from Greek Catholic Church, 2 from Eastern Orthodox Church, 1 from Other and not ascertained christian church, 1 from Christian Congregations in Slovakia, 1 from Islam, 1 from United Methodist Church, 1 from Apostolic Church and 1 from Ad hoc movements.

== Genealogical resources ==
The records for genealogical research are available at the state archive "Statny Archiv in Bratislava, Slovakia"

- Roman Catholic church records (births/marriages/deaths): 1676-1934 (parish B)

== Notable residents ==
- Gyula Kertész (1888–1982), Hungarian footballer

== See also ==
- List of municipalities and towns in Slovakia
