= Modra nad Cirochou =

- Municipality
- Flag

- Location of Modra nad Cirochou in the Prešov Region Location of Modra nad Cirochou in Slovakia
- Coordinates: 48.94°N 22.04°E
- Country: Slovakia
- Region: Prešov Region
- District: Humenné District
- First mentioned: 1451

Area
  - Total: 7.35 km^{2} (2.84 sq mi)
- Elevation: 207 m (679 ft)

Population (2025)
  - Total: 940
- Time zone: UTC+1 (CET)
  - Summer (DST): UTC+2 (CEST)
- Postal code: 678 2
- Area code: +421 57
- Vehicle registration plate (until 2022): HE
- Website: www.modranadcirochou.sk

Modra nad Cirochou is a village and municipality in Humenné District in the Prešov Region of north-east Slovakia.

== History ==
In historical records the village was first mentioned in 1451.

== Geography ==
The municipality lies at an altitude of 207 metres (679 ft) and covers an area of 7.35 km^{2} (2.84 sq mi) (2025).

== Population ==
Population statistic (10 years)
Year	1995	2005	2015	2025
Count	1087	1042	1014	940
Difference		−4.13%	−2.68%	−7.29%

Population statistic
Year	2024	2025
Count	949	940
Difference		−0.94%

It has a population of 940 people (31 December 2025).

=== Ethnicity ===
Census 2021 (1+ %)
Ethnicity	Number	Fraction
Slovak	974	98.98%
Total	984	

In year 2021 was 984 people by ethnicity 974 as Slovak, 7 as Rusyn, 4 as Czech, 4 as Hungarian, 3 as Not found out, 2 as Ukrainian, 1 as Romani, 1 as Moravian and 1 as Other.

Note on population: The difference values of population numbers in the table "Population statistic" and in the sections "Ethnicity" & "Religion" is caused by the use of various statistical methods.

=== Religion ===
Census 2021 (1+ %)
Religion	Number	Fraction
Roman Catholic Church	948	96.34%
None	15	1.52%
Greek Catholic Church	11	1.12%
Total	984	

In year 2021 was 984 people by religion 948 from Roman Catholic Church, 15 from None, 11 from Greek Catholic Church, 3 from Eastern Orthodox Church, 3 from Other, 1 from Old Catholic Church, 1 from Other and not ascertained christian church, 1 from Not found out and 1 from Buddhism.
