= Bojná =

Bojná Nyitrabajna
- Municipality
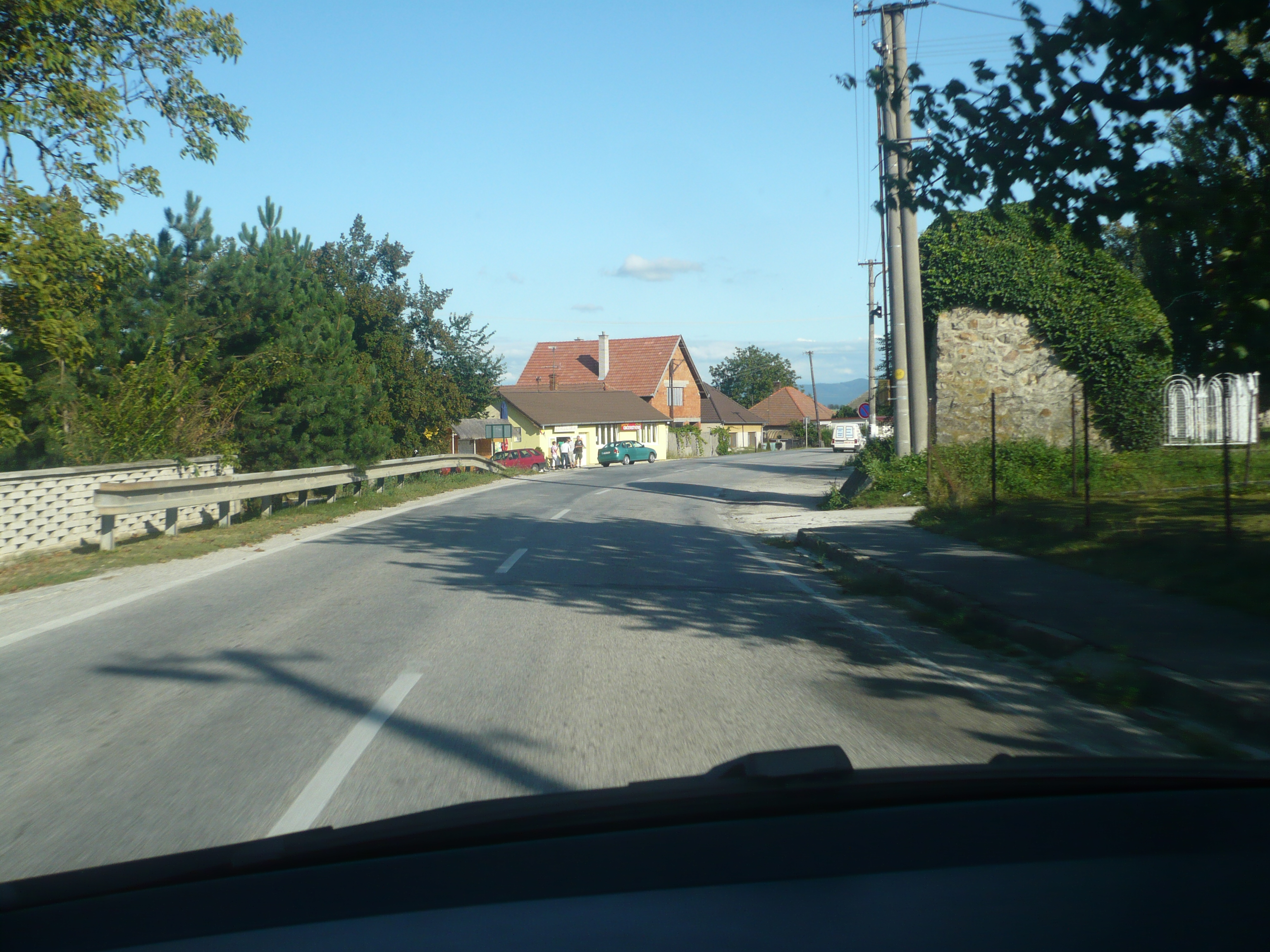

- Flag

- Location of Bojná in the Nitra Region Location of Bojná in Slovakia
- Coordinates: 48.58°N 18.06°E
- Country: Slovakia
- Region: Nitra Region
- District: Topoľčany District
- First mentioned: 1424

Area
  - Total: 33.80 km^{2} (13.05 sq mi)
- Elevation: 202 m (663 ft)

Population (2025)
  - Total: 1,959
- Time zone: UTC+1 (CET)
  - Summer (DST): UTC+2 (CEST)
- Postal code: 956 01
- Area code: +421 38
- Vehicle registration plate (until 2022): TO
- Website: www.bojna.sk

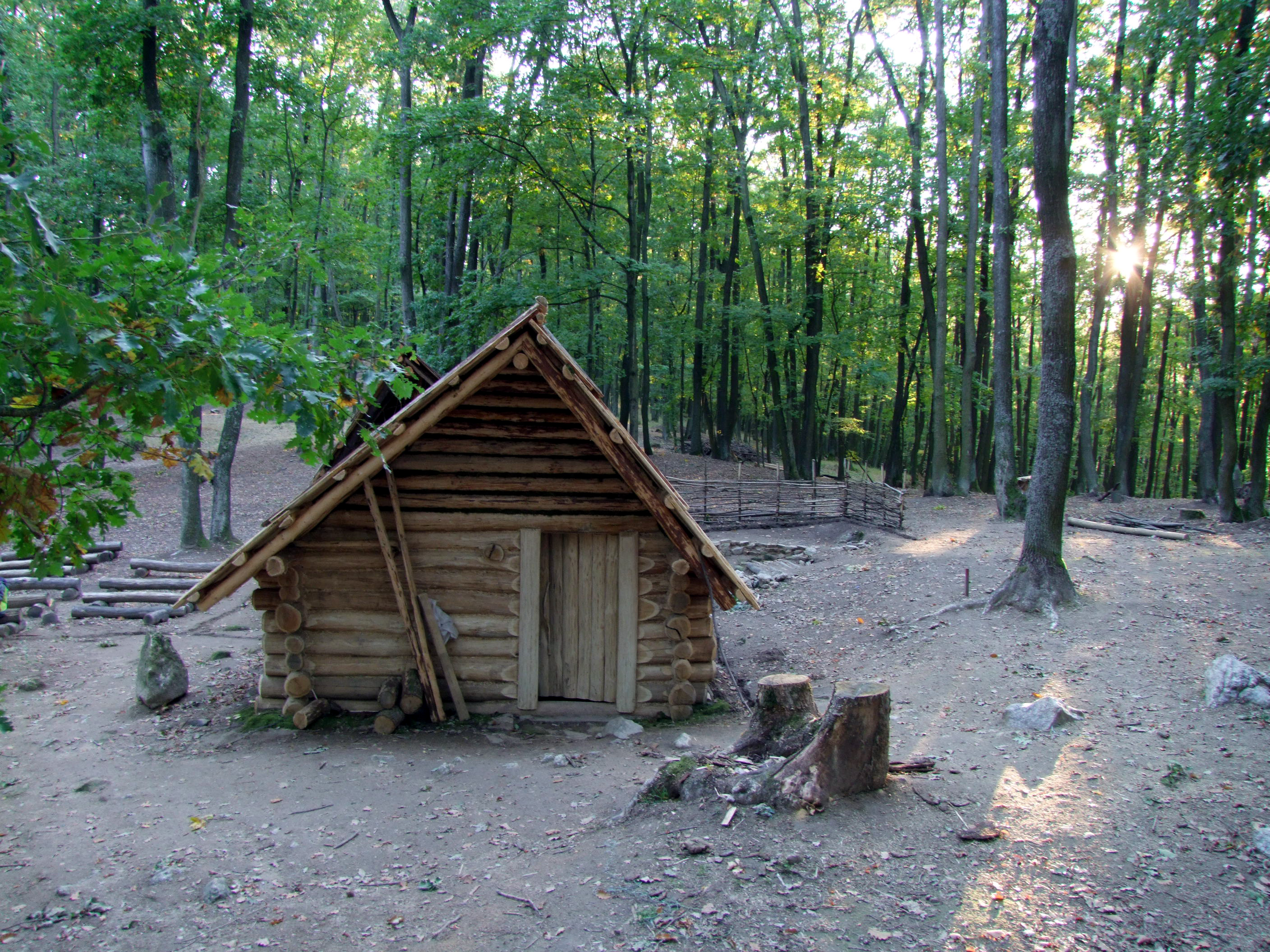
Reconstruction of Bojná hillfort

Bojná (Hungarian: Nyitrabajna) is a municipality in the Topoľčany District of the Nitra Region, Slovakia. The village has a population of 2013 people. The main landmark is the Catholic Church of All Saints built in 1787. Opposite the church stands (since World War II defunct) synagogue, later turned community center then car repair and nowadays a bar. The village stretches about 4 km along river Bojnianka which continues through villages of Veľké Dvorany, Urmince and Chrabrany before emptying into the Nitra river, itself a tributary of the Danube.

== Geography ==
The municipality lies at an altitude of 202 metres (663 ft) and covers an area of 33.80 km^{2} (13.05 sq mi) (2025).

== Etymology ==
The name is derived from boj (fight, battle) preserved in all Slavic languages. Bojna or Bojnica meant place of battle, battleground (modern Slovak: bojisko) but the name could also be derived from some personal name related to boj, e.g. Bojan, Bojen. In this case, Bojná is shortening of Bojnja Ves - village of Bojen. Similar names in Slovakia are Bojnice, Bojničky, Bojanová, Bojarky and many others.

== Archaeological complex ==
Bojná is known for an archaeological complex which belongs to one of the largest Great Moravian agglomeration in Slovakia. The system of Slavic hill forts lies on the southeast foot of Považský Inovec on the strategic point between the Váh and Nitra river basins. The pass near Bojná was guarded by hill forts Bojná I (Valy), Bojná II (Hradisko), Bojná III (Žihľavník) and the location Bojná IV (Nové Valy). The locality is close to other pre-Great Moravian and Great Moravian sites like Pobedim, Ducové or Nitrianska Blatnica.

The hill fort Bojná I was protected by multiple walls as high as 6 meters with ditches and gates. In the 9th century, the hill fort was intensely populated. Several craft workshops (mostly smithies) and thousands of artifacts were unearthed in the place. Along with artisanal and agricultural tools, a large number of weapons including typical battle axes, large knives, fragments of swords and seaxes. The presence of elite warriors can be documented by spurs, chain armors, gold-plated parts of military equipment, gold-coated and silver-coated adornments and other luxury objects. The religious articles belong to the oldest Christian articles in Slovakia. The most important findings are a bronze bell of Canino type, fragments of three other bells and six gold-coated plaquettes with angels and Christ dated to 780–820, a dozen years before the mission of Saints Cyril and Methodius. Two short inscriptions in the Latin alphabet are the oldest evidence of writing in Slovak history.

A large number of weapons can be related to the violent destruction of the hill fort, probably by the old Hungarian units. According to radiocarbon data and other dating methods, the hill fort could be used less intense in the 10th century, later settlement is not documented. The artifacts are displayed in Ponitrianske múzeum of Nitra. A local museum has opened in August 2007. Valy locality is currently being researched by an international archaeologist team.

== Later history ==
The village itself was first mentioned in 1424, though an incorporated settlement Malé Dvorany was first mentioned in the end of the 12th century. Before the world wars there was also a sizeable Jewish population here. The synagogue, once the approximate size of the remaining church, has been turned into a bar and a sports hall.

== Present ==
Football is a popular sport and the village hosts two male adult teams (Slovan Bojná and Malé Dvorany) plus several junior teams.

Many of the locals and also outsiders have additional property used for recreation and gardening at the location called Vinohrad (vineyard) plus there are more cottages in the neighbouring forest. The forest itself is also used for mushroom picking by the villagers.

A private mini-zoo and a ranch has been opened at the forest line near the upper end of the village.

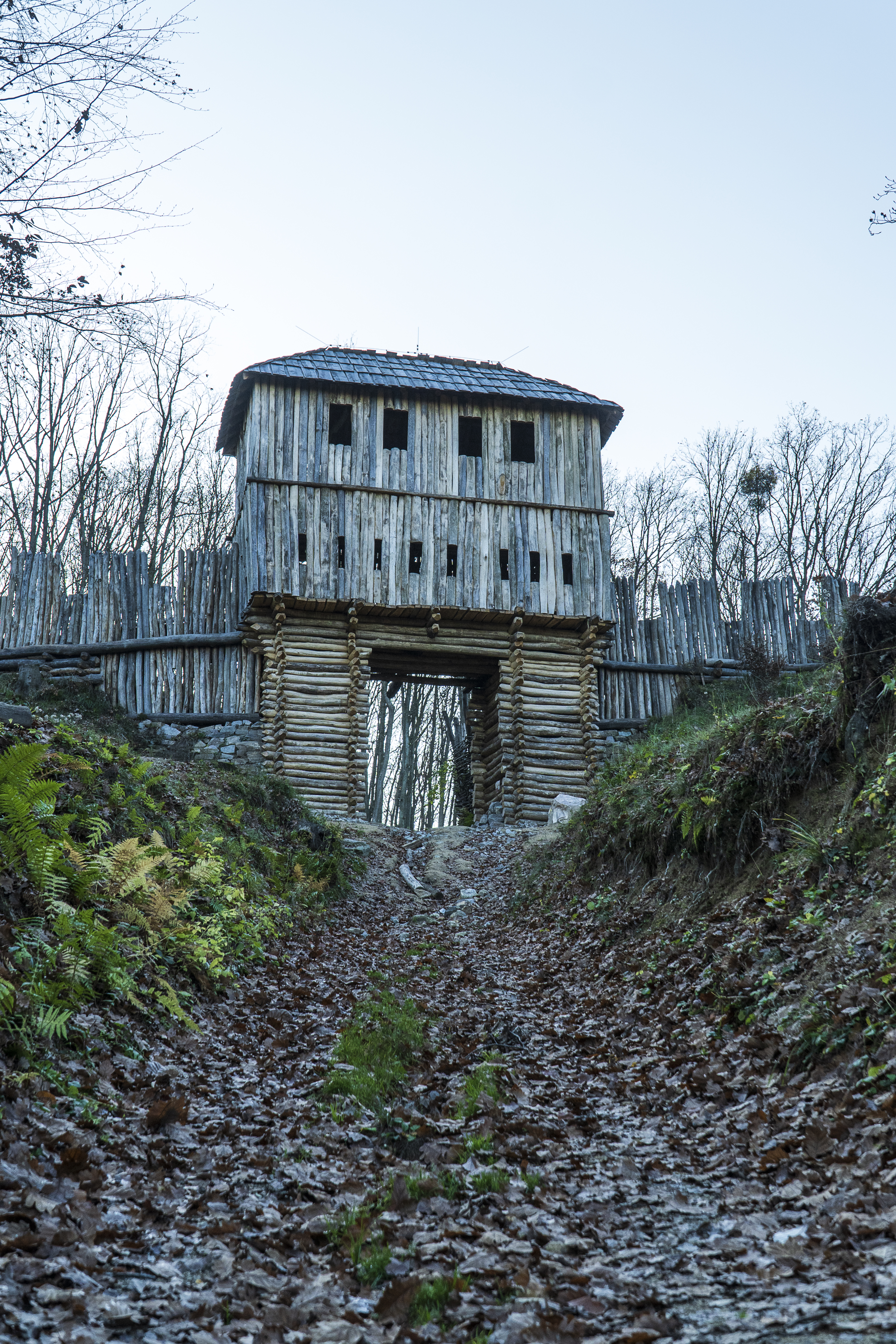
Replica of entrance gate of hillfort Bojná I. - Valy.

As of 2018, the eastern gate was reconstructed at the hillfort Bojná - Valy. It is 11 m high, 12 m wide and it has 7 m long tunnel behind the gate.

== Population ==
Population statistic (10 years)
| Year | 1995 | 2005 | 2015 | 2025 |
|---|---|---|---|---|
| Count | 2049 | 1948 | 2038 | 1959 |
| Difference | | −4.92% | +4.62% | −3.87% |

Population statistic
| Year | 2024 | 2025 |
|---|---|---|
| Count | 1957 | 1959 |
| Difference | | +0.10% |

It has a population of 1959 people (31 December 2025).

=== Ethnicity ===
Census 2021 (1+%)
| Ethnicity | Number | Fraction |
|---|---|---|
| Slovak | 1924 | 94.87% |
| Not found out | 89 | 4.38% |
| Total | 2028 | |

In year 2021 was 2028 people by ethnicity 1924 as Slovak, 89 as Not found out, 6 as Czech, 6 as Ukrainian, 6 as Rusyn, 5 as Hungarian, 4 as Russian, 4 as Other, 2 as Romanian, 1 as Vietnamese, 1 as Romani and 1 as Greek.

Note on population: The difference values of population numbers in the table "Population statistic" and in the sections "Ethnicity" & "Religion" is caused by the use of various statistical methods.

=== Religion ===
Census 2021 (1+%)
| Religion | Number | Fraction |
|---|---|---|
| Roman Catholic Church | 1669 | 82.3% |
| None | 197 | 9.71% |
| Not found out | 98 | 4.83% |
| Evangelical Church | 22 | 1.08% |
| Total | 2028 | |

In year 2021 was 2028 people by religion 1669 from Roman Catholic Church, 197 from None, 98 from Not found out, 22 from Evangelical Church, 16 from Ad hoc movements, 6 from Eastern Orthodox Church, 5 from Greek Catholic Church, 3 from Other and not ascertained christian church, 3 from Apostolic Church, 2 from Christian Congregations in Slovakia, 2 from Buddhism, 1 from Old Catholic Church, 1 from Calvinist Church, 1 from Jehovah's Witnesses, 1 from Islam and 1 from Other.

== See also ==
- List of municipalities and towns in Slovakia

== Sources ==
- Horňanský, Imrich (2015). "O geografických názvoch so slovným základom treb- a boj- (2. časť)" [About geographics names with the root treb- and boj- (part 2)] (PDF). Kultúra slova (in Slovak). 49.
- Turčan, Vladimír (2012). Veľkomoravské hradiská [The Great Moravian Castles] (in Slovak). Bratislava: Dajama. ISBN 978-80-8136-013-8.

== Genealogical resources ==
The records for genealogical research are available at the state archive "Statny Archiv in Nitra, Slovakia"

- Roman Catholic church records (births/marriages/deaths): 1721-1895 (parish A)
- Lutheran church records (births/marriages/deaths): 1708-1895 (parish B)
