= List of twin towns and sister cities in the Czech Republic =

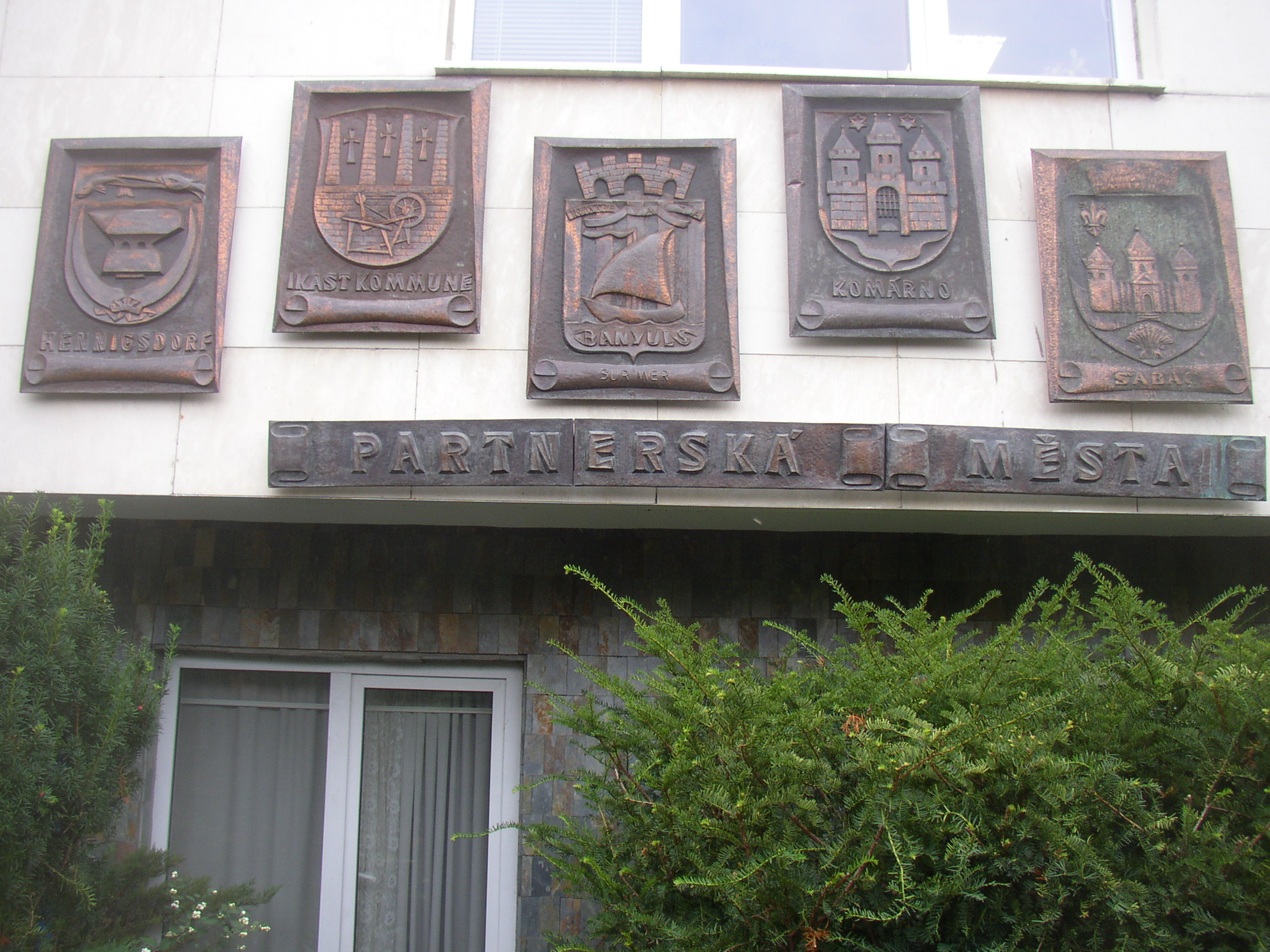
Insignia of twin towns on town hall in Kralupy nad Vltavou

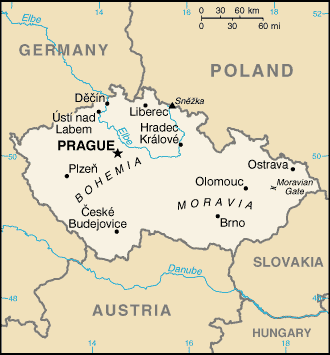
Map of the Czech Republic

This is a list of municipalities in the Czech Republic which have standing links to local communities in other countries known as "town twinning" (usually in Europe) or "sister cities" (usually in the rest of the world).

== A ==
Adršpach

- Lubawka, Poland
- Radków, Poland

Albrechtice nad Orlicí

- Wörgl, Austria

Andělská Hora

- Reńska Wieś, Poland

Aš

- Fiumefreddo di Sicilia, Italy
- Marktbreit, Germany
- Oelsnitz, Germany
- Plauen, Germany
- Rehau, Germany

== B ==
=== Be–Bi ===
Bečov nad Teplou

- Eschenburg, Germany

Bělá nad Radbuzou

- Eslarn, Germany
- Hindelbank, Switzerland

Bělá pod Bezdězem

- Groß-Bieberau, Germany
- Svätý Jur, Slovakia

Bělá pod Pradědem

- Tułowice, Poland

Bělotín

- Hinterschmiding, Germany
- Höchst im Odenwald, Germany
- Kolonowskie, Poland

Benátky nad Jizerou

- Hustopeče, Czech Republic
- Modra, Slovakia
- Reinsdorf, Germany
- Roßdorf, Germany

Benešov

- Partizánske, Slovakia
- Sainte-Agnès, France

Benešov nad Ploučnicí

- Heidenau, Germany

Beroun

- Brzeg, Poland
- Goslar, Germany

Bílina

- Biłgoraj, Poland
- Dippoldiswalde, Germany
- Jaraczewo, Poland
- Kobylí, Czech Republic
- Mošćenička Draga, Croatia
- Novovolynsk, Ukraine
- Stropkov, Slovakia

Bílovec

- Bad Neustadt an der Saale, Germany
- Kietrz, Poland
- Lipany, Slovakia

=== Bl–Bo ===
Blansko

- Komárno, Slovakia
- Legnica, Poland
- Mürzzuschlag, Austria
- Scandiano, Italy

Blatná

- Roggwil, Switzerland
- Sargé-lès-le-Mans, France
- Vacha, Germany
- Važec, Slovakia

Blatnička

- Falkenstein, Austria

Blovice

- Teublitz, Germany
- Triptis, Germany

Bludov

- Lehota pod Vtáčnikom, Slovakia

Bochov

- Thiersheim, Germany

Bohdíkov

- Nitrianske Sučany, Slovakia

Bohumín

- Gorzyce, Poland
- Prudnik, Poland

Bojkovice

- Trenčianska Turná, Slovakia

Bolatice

- Doľany, Slovakia
- Kysucký Lieskovec, Slovakia
- Linum (Fehrbellin), Germany
- Nagykovácsi, Hungary
- Rudy (Kuźnia Raciborska), Poland

Bor

- Pleystein, Germany
- Wernberg-Köblitz, Germany

Boskovice

- Frasnes-lez-Anvaing, Belgium
- Levice, Slovakia
- Prnjavor, Bosnia and Herzegovina
- Rawa Mazowiecka, Poland

=== Br ===
Brandýs nad Labem-Stará Boleslav

- Dunaivtsi, Ukraine
- Gödöllő, Hungary
- Montescudaio, Italy
- Turek, Poland

Branka u Opavy

- Kornowac, Poland

Břeclav

- Andrychów, Poland
- Brezová pod Bradlom, Slovakia
- Lysá nad Labem, Czech Republic
- Novi Vinodolski, Croatia
- Priverno, Italy
- Trnava, Slovakia

Březina

- Valaská Dubová, Slovakia

Březnice

- Lindow, Germany

Brno

- Bratislava, Slovakia
- Dallas, United States
- Debrecen, Hungary
- Kaunas, Lithuania
- Kharkiv, Ukraine
- Leeds, England, United Kingdom
- Leipzig, Germany
- Lviv, Ukraine
- Poznań, Poland
- Rennes, France
- Sankt Pölten, Austria
- Stuttgart, Germany
- Uzhhorod, Ukraine
- Zagreb, Croatia

Brno-Bosonohy

- Abbadia Lariana, Italy

Brno-Vinohrady

- Vajnory (Bratislava), Slovakia

Broumov

- Forchheim, Germany
- Nowa Ruda, Poland

Brtnice

- Orpund, Switzerland

Brumovice

- Záhorská Bystrica (Bratislava), Slovakia

Bruntál

- Büdingen, Germany
- Castellarano, Italy
- Opole, Poland
- Plungė, Lithuania
- Štúrovo, Slovakia

=== Bu–Bz ===
Bučovice

- Malý Slavkov, Slovakia

Budišov nad Budišovkou

- Głubczyce County, Poland
- Mszana, Poland
- Stráňavy, Slovakia

Budyně nad Ohří

- Hohnstein, Germany

Buštěhrad

- Ledro, Italy

Bystré

- Hohenems, Austria

Bystřice

- Goleszów, Poland
- Pińczów, Poland
- Svodín, Slovakia
- Tata, Hungary

Bystřice nad Pernštejnem

- Boguchwała, Poland
- Crimmitschau, Germany
- Trostyanets, Ukraine
- Vranov nad Topľou, Slovakia

Bystřice pod Hostýnem

- Salzkotten, Germany
- San Giovanni al Natisone, Italy

Bzenec

- Egeln, Germany
- Mûrs-Erigné, France

== C ==
=== Ca–Ce ===
Čáslav

- Opfikon, Switzerland

Častolovice

- Kondratowice, Poland

Čejetice

- Oberwil im Simmental, Switzerland

Černošice

- Gerbrunn, Germany
- Leśnica, Poland
- Themar, Germany

Černošín

- Pullenreuth, Germany

Černovice

- Biglen, Switzerland

Černý Důl

- Kowary, Poland

Červená Řečice

- Kirchdorf, Switzerland

Červený Kostelec

- Küsnacht, Switzerland
- Uchte, Germany
- Warrington, England, United Kingdom
- Ząbkowice Śląskie, Poland

Česká Kamenice

- Bad Schandau, Germany

Česká Lípa

- Bardejov, Slovakia
- Bolesławiec, Poland
- Mittweida, Germany
- Molde, Norway
- Uzhhorod, Ukraine

Česká Skalice

- Bardo, Poland
- Kudowa-Zdrój, Poland
- Liptovský Hrádok, Slovakia
- Polanica-Zdrój, Poland
- Rüschlikon, Switzerland
- Vojnik, Slovenia
- Warrington, England, United Kingdom

Česká Třebová

- Agrate Brianza, Italy
- Horní Lhota, Czech Republic
- Oława, Poland
- Svit, Slovakia

České Budějovice

- Linz, Austria
- Lorient, France
- Nitra, Slovakia
- Passau, Germany
- Suhl, Germany

Český Brod

- Köngen, Germany

Český Krumlov

- Hauzenberg, Germany
- Kalush, Ukraine
- Llanwrtyd Wells, Wales, United Kingdom
- Miami Beach, United States
- San Gimignano, Italy
- Slovenj Gradec, Slovenia
- Vöcklabruck, Austria

Český Těšín

- Cieszyn, Poland
- Rožňava, Slovakia

=== Ch ===
Chabařovice

- Drebach, Germany
- Ždiar, Slovakia

Cheb

- Bắc Ninh, Vietnam
- Hof, Germany
- Nová Dubnica, Slovakia

Chlebičov

- Liptovské Revúce, Slovakia

Chlumec nad Cidlinou

- Valaská, Slovakia

Chodov

- Oelsnitz, Germany
- Waldsassen, Germany

Chodová Planá

- Störnstein, Germany

Chomutov

- Annaberg-Buchholz, Germany
- Bernburg, Germany
- Trnava, Slovakia

Chotěboř

- Tiachiv, Ukraine
- Tiszafüred, Hungary

Chrastava

- Eichstätt, Germany
- Lwówek Śląski, Poland

Chrudim

- Motovun, Croatia
- Oleśnica, Poland
- Svidník, Slovakia
- Znojmo, Czech Republic

Chyňava

- Ledro, Italy

Chýnov

- Oberthal, Switzerland

== D ==
=== Da–Di ===
Dačice

- Groß-Siegharts, Austria
- Urtenen-Schönbühl, Switzerland

Darkovice

- Lyski, Poland

Děčín

- Bełchatów, Poland
- Jonava, Lithuania
- Pirna, Germany
- Přerov, Czech Republic
- Ružomberok, Slovakia

Desná

- Malschwitz, Germany
- Podgórzyn, Poland

Díly

- Rötz, Germany

Dírná

- Forst-Längenbühl, Switzerland

=== Do ===
Dobrá

- Buczkowice, Poland
- Mucharz, Poland
- Ochodnica, Slovakia

Dobřany

- Brežice, Slovenia
- Dobřany, Czech Republic
- Obertraubling, Germany

Dobratice

- Zábiedovo, Slovakia

Dobřichovice

- Manhattan, United States
- Villieu-Loyes-Mollon, France

Dobříš

- Geldrop-Mierlo, Netherlands
- Tonnerre, France

Dobronín

- Bellmund, Switzerland

Dobruška

- Ábrahámhegy, Hungary
- Hnúšťa, Slovakia
- Miejska Górka, Poland
- Piława Górna, Poland
- Radków, Poland
- Veľký Meder, Slovakia

Doksy (Česká Lípa District)

- Bolków, Poland
- Oybin, Germany

Doksy (Kladno District)

- Ledro, Italy

Dolní Bečva

- Kamenec pod Vtáčnikom, Slovakia

Dolní Benešov

- Rajecké Teplice, Slovakia
- Wilamowice, Poland

Dolní Bukovsko

- Kallnach, Switzerland

Dolní Čermná

- Dzierżoniów, Poland
- Kazár, Hungary
- Liptovská Teplička, Slovakia
- Velykyi Bereznyi, Ukraine

Dolní Dobrouč

- Rovereto, Italy

Dolní Domaslavice

- Strumień, Poland

Dolní Kounice

- Azay-le-Brûlé, France
- Caprese Michelangelo, Italy

Dolní Lutyně

- Godów, Poland
- Gorzyce, Poland

Dolní Poustevna

- Sebnitz, Germany

Domažlice

- Furth bei Göttweig, Austria
- Furth im Wald, Germany
- Ludres, France
- Two Rivers, United States

=== Dr–Dv ===
Dřevohostice

- Turawa, Poland

Dubá

- Mirsk, Poland

Dubí

- Altenberg, Germany
- Arnstadt, Germany
- Bannewitz, Germany

Duchcov

- Miltenberg, Germany
- Mulda, Germany

Dvorce

- Strzeleczki, Poland

Dvůr Králové nad Labem

- Bushtyno, Ukraine
- Kamienna Góra, Poland
- Kowary, Poland
- Piegaro, Italy
- Verneuil-en-Halatte, France

== F ==
Františkovy Lázně

- Bad Soden, Germany

Frenštát pod Radhoštěm

- Harrachov, Czech Republic
- Krásno nad Kysucou, Slovakia
- La Grange, United States
- Ustroń, Poland

Frýdek-Místek

- Bielsko-Biała, Poland
- Harelbeke, Belgium
- Mysłowice, Poland
- Žilina, Slovakia
- Żywiec County, Poland

Frýdlant

- Friedland, Brandenburg, Germany
- Friedland, Lower Saxony, Germany
- Friedland, Mecklenburg-Vorpommern, Germany
- Frýdlant nad Ostravicí, Czech Republic
- Korfantów, Poland
- Mieroszów, Poland
- Pravdinsk, Russia
- Siekierczyn, Poland

Frýdlant nad Ostravicí

- Debrzno, Poland
- Dravograd, Slovenia
- Friedland, Brandenburg, Germany
- Friedland, Lower Saxony, Germany
- Friedland, Mecklenburg-Vorpommern, Germany
- Frýdlant, Czech Republic
- Korfantów, Poland
- Mieroszów, Poland
- Mirosławiec, Poland
- Pravdinsk, Russia
- Radeburg, Germany
- Turzovka, Slovakia

Fryšták

- Kanianka, Slovakia
- Muráň, Slovakia

Fulnek

- Châtel-sur-Moselle, France
- Łaziska Górne, Poland
- Ljutomer, Slovenia
- Sučany, Slovakia
- Téglás, Hungary
- Vrútky, Slovakia

== H ==
=== Ha–Hl ===
Habartov

- Bad Berneck, Germany
- Lengenfeld, Germany

Hanušovice

- Nitrianske Pravno, Slovakia

Hartmanice

- Affoltern im Emmental, Switzerland
- Rinchnach, Germany

Havířov

- Collegno, Italy
- Harlow, England, United Kingdom
- Jastrzębie-Zdrój, Poland
- Mažeikiai, Lithuania
- Omiš, Croatia
- Paide, Estonia
- Turčianske Teplice, Slovakia
- Zagorje ob Savi, Slovenia

Havlíčkův Brod

- Brielle, Netherlands
- Brixen, Italy
- Spišská Nová Ves, Slovakia

Hejnice

- Łęknica, Poland

Heřmanice

- Pieńsk, Poland

Hlinsko

- Púchov, Slovakia
- Stara Pazova, Serbia

Hluboká nad Vltavou

- Bolligen, Switzerland
- Grein, Austria
- Neustadt an der Aisch, Germany

Hlučín

- Namysłów, Poland
- Nebelschütz, Germany
- Ružomberok, Slovakia

Hluk

- Nemšová, Slovakia
- Planá nad Lužnicí, Czech Republic

=== Ho ===
Hodkovice nad Mohelkou

- Węgliniec, Poland

Hodonín

- Holíč, Slovakia
- Jasło, Poland
- Skalica, Slovakia
- Trebišov, Slovakia
- Vignola, Italy
- Zistersdorf, Austria

Holešov

- Desinić, Croatia
- Považská Bystrica, Slovakia
- Pszczyna, Poland
- Skawina, Poland
- Topoľčianky, Slovakia
- Turčianske Teplice, Slovakia

Holice

- Medzev, Slovakia
- Strzelce Opolskie, Poland

Holýšov

- Kümmersbruck, Germany
- Port, Switzerland

Horažďovice

- Heimberg, Switzerland

Hořice

- Jabłonka, Poland
- Kerepes, Hungary
- Strzegom, Poland
- Trstená, Slovakia

Horní Benešov

- Pszów, Poland

Horní Bříza

- Villeneuve-sur-Yonne, France

Horní Jiřetín

- Battenberg, Germany

Horní Lideč

- Dohňany, Slovakia

Horní Planá

- Ulrichsberg, Austria

Horní Slavkov

- Arzberg, Germany
- Rosenbach, Germany
- Sławków, Poland

Horní Suchá

- Gelnica, Slovakia
- Lubomia, Poland
- Nižná, Slovakia

Hořovice

- Gau-Algesheim, Germany

Horšovský Týn

- Maarkedal, Belgium
- Nabburg, Germany

Hostinné

- Bensheim, Germany
- Wojcieszów, Poland

Hostouň

- Waldthurn, Germany

=== Hr–Hv ===
Hradec Králové

- Alessandria, Italy
- Arnhem, Netherlands
- Banská Bystrica, Slovakia
- Chernihiv, Ukraine
- Giessen, Germany
- Kaštela, Croatia
- Metz, France
- Wałbrzych, Poland
- Wrocław, Poland

Hradec nad Moravicí

- Baborów, Poland
- Liptovský Hrádok, Slovakia

Hrádek

- Čierne, Slovakia
- Radoľa, Slovakia
- Skoczów, Poland

Hrádek nad Nisou

- Bogatynia, Poland
- Kralupy nad Vltavou, Czech Republic
- Zittau, Germany

Hradištko

- Essen, Belgium

Hranice

- Hlohovec, Slovakia
- Konstancin-Jeziorna, Poland
- Leidschendam-Voorburg, Netherlands
- Slovenske Konjice, Slovenia

Hronov

- Bielawa, Poland
- Kudowa-Zdrój, Poland
- Nowa Ruda (rural gmina), Poland
- Warrington, England, United Kingdom

Hrušky

- Waldbredimus, Luxembourg

Hukvaldy

- Wisła, Poland

Hulín

- Zlaté Moravce, Slovakia

Humpolec

- Námestovo, Slovakia

Husinec

- Beatenberg, Switzerland

Hustopeče

- Benátky nad Jizerou, Czech Republic
- Miedźna, Poland
- Modra, Slovakia

Hutisko-Solanec

- Makov, Slovakia

Hvozdná

- East Bernard, United States

Hynčice

- Radków, Poland

== I ==
Ivančice

- Radovljica, Slovenia
- Sládkovičovo, Slovakia
- Soyaux, France
- Stupava, Slovakia

== J ==
Jablonec nad Jizerou

- Sulzbach, Germany

Jablonec nad Nisou

- Bautzen, Germany
- Beihai, China
- Jelenia Góra, Poland
- Kaufbeuren, Germany
- Marsciano, Italy
- Ronse, Belgium
- Zwickau, Germany

Jablonné nad Orlicí

- Hinwil, Switzerland
- Kondratowice, Poland
- Seehausen, Germany

Jablunkov

- Gogolin, Poland
- Kysucké Nové Mesto, Slovakia
- Siemianowice Śląskie, Poland
- Tiachiv, Ukraine
- Wisła, Poland

Jáchymov

- Schneeberg, Germany

Janské Lázně

- Polanica-Zdrój, Poland

Jaroměř

- Warrington, England, United Kingdom
- Ziębice, Poland

Javorník

- Otmuchów, Poland
- Złoty Stok, Poland

Jedovnice

- Aschheim, Germany

Jemnice

- Raabs an der Thaya, Austria
- Reszel, Poland

Jeseník

- Bojnice, Slovakia
- Głuchołazy, Poland
- Neuburg an der Donau, Germany
- Nysa, Poland

Jevíčko

- Abasha, Georgia
- Martvili, Georgia

Jičín

- Erbach im Odenwald, Germany
- Martin, Slovakia
- Świdnica County, Poland

Jihlava

- Heidenheim an der Brenz, Germany
- Uzhhorod, Ukraine
- Zgierz, Poland

Jilemnice

- Świebodzice, Poland
- Świeradów-Zdrój, Poland

Jílové

- Rosenthal-Bielatal, Germany

Jílové u Prahy

- Holzgerlingen, Germany
- Nováky, Slovakia
- Peschici, Italy

Jimramov

- Meyrargues, France

Jindřichov

- Hennersdorf, Austria

Jindřichovice pod Smrkem

- Świeradów-Zdrój, Poland

Jindřichův Hradec

- Dunajská Streda, Slovakia
- Neckargemünd, Germany
- Sárospatak, Hungary
- Zwettl, Austria

Jirkov

- Bátonyterenye, Hungary
- Brand-Erbisdorf, Germany
- Kobylnica, Poland
- Nové Mesto nad Váhom, Slovakia
- Šentjur, Slovenia

== K ==
=== Ka ===
Kadaň

- Aue-Bad Schlema, Germany
- Halle, Belgium
- Vara, Sweden

Kamenický Šenov

- Rheinbach, Germany

Kamenná

- Łambinowice, Poland

Kamenný Újezd

- Krauchthal, Switzerland

Kanice

- Spillern, Austria

Kaplice

- Freistadt, Austria

Kardašova Řečice

- Oberdiessbach, Switzerland

Karlovy Vary

- Baden-Baden, Germany
- Bernkastel-Kues, Germany
- Carlsbad, United States
- Eilat, Israel
- Kusatsu, Japan
- Locarno, Switzerland
- Varberg, Sweden

Karlštejn

- Althen-des-Paluds, France
- Montecarlo, Italy
- Reichenbach im Vogtland, Germany

Karolinka

- Bytča, Slovakia
- Papradno, Slovakia
- Vysoká nad Kysucou, Slovakia

Karviná

- Jastrzębie-Zdrój, Poland
- Jaworzno, Poland
- Kaili, China
- Rybnik, Poland
- Wodzisław Śląski, Poland

Kašava

- Breitenbach, France
- Rohožník, Slovakia

Kašperské Hory

- Grafenau, Germany

=== Ke–Ko ===
Kelč

- Ladce, Slovakia

Kladno

- Bellevue, United States
- Vitry-sur-Seine, France

Klášterec nad Ohří

- Großrückerswalde, Germany

Klatovy

- Cham, Germany
- Poligny, France

Klenčí pod Čerchovem

- Herent, Belgium
- Kleneč, Czech Republic
- Waldmünchen, Germany

Klimkovice

- Ilava, Slovakia
- Mikołów, Poland

Kolín

- Dietikon, Switzerland
- Duino-Aurisina, Italy
- Érd, Hungary
- Kamenz, Germany
- Lubań, Poland
- Rimavská Sobota, Slovakia

Kolinec

- Tápiószentmárton, Hungary
- Zemianska Olča, Slovakia

Komorní Lhotka

- Boronów, Poland

Kopřivnice

- Bánovce nad Bebravou, Slovakia
- Castiglione del Lago, Italy
- Myszków, Poland
- Trappes, France
- Zwönitz, Germany

Koryčany

- Lehota, Slovakia

Košařiska

- Dunajov, Slovakia
- Rajcza, Poland

Košíky

- Nová Bošáca, Slovakia

Kosmonosy

- Seeheim-Jugenheim, Germany

Košťany

- Košťany nad Turcom, Slovakia
- Valaliky, Slovakia

Kostelec nad Černými lesy

- Mamirolle, France

Kostelec nad Orlicí

- Bielawa, Poland
- Dubove, Ukraine
- Myjava, Slovakia
- Zeulenroda-Triebes, Germany

Kotvrdovice

- Aschheim, Germany

Kovářov

- Seftigen, Switzerland

Kovářská

- Sehmatal, Germany

=== Kr ===
Králíky

- Międzylesie, Poland
- Solbiate Olona, Italy
- Villmar, Germany

Králova Lhota

- Kráľova Lehota, Slovakia

Kralupy nad Vltavou

- Banyuls-sur-Mer, France
- Hennigsdorf, Germany
- Hrádek nad Nisou, Czech Republic
- Komárno, Slovakia
- Miren-Kostanjevica, Slovenia
- Šabac, Serbia
- Środa Wielkopolska, Poland

Kraslice

- Klingenthal, Germany

Krásná

- Bziny, Slovakia
- Wilkowice, Poland

Krásná Lípa

- Kottmar, Germany
- Práznovce, Slovakia
- Sebnitz, Germany
- Żyrardów, Poland

Krásno

- Bischofsgrün, Germany

Kravaře

- Lisková, Slovakia
- Lubliniec, Poland
- Woźniki, Poland

Krnov

- Głubczyce, Poland
- Karben, Germany
- Lykovrysi-Pefki, Greece
- Mińsk Mazowiecki, Poland
- Nadvirna, Ukraine
- Prudnik, Poland
- Rajec, Slovakia
- Saint-Égrève, France
- Telšiai, Lithuania

Kroměříž

- Châteaudun, France
- Nitra, Slovakia
- Krems an der Donau, Austria
- Piekary Śląskie, Poland
- Râmnicu Vâlcea, Romania
- Ružomberok, Slovakia

Krupka

- Geising (Altenberg), Germany

=== Ku–Ky ===
Kunín

- Leimen, Germany

Kunovice

- Pocheon, South Korea
- Stará Turá, Slovakia
- West, United States

Kunratice

- Pieńsk, Poland

Kunštát

- Stari Grad, Croatia

Kunvald

- Lititz, United States

Kuřim

- Niepołomice, Poland
- Stupava, Slovakia

Kutná Hora

- Bingen am Rhein, Germany
- Eger, Hungary
- Fidenza, Italy
- Jajce, Bosnia and Herzegovina
- Kamianets-Podilskyi, Ukraine
- Kremnica, Slovakia
- Reims, France
- Ringsted, Denmark
- Stamford, England, United Kingdom
- Tarnowskie Góry, Poland

Kyjov

- Biograd na Moru, Croatia
- Hollabrunn, Austria
- Lutsk, Ukraine
- Pezinok, Slovakia
- Prizren, Kosovo
- Seravezza, Italy
- Yvetot, France

Kynšperk nad Ohří

- Himmelkron, Germany

== L ==
=== La–Lh ===
Lanškroun

- Castiglione in Teverina, Italy
- Dzierżoniów, Poland
- Hajdúszoboszló, Hungary
- Kežmarok, Slovakia
- Serock, Poland

Lanžhot

- Rabensburg, Austria

Lázně Bělohrad

- Belene, Bulgaria

Lázně Kynžvart

- Bad Bocklet, Germany

Lázně Libverda

- Mirsk, Poland
- Świeradów-Zdrój, Poland
- Trzebiel, Poland

Letohrad

- Daruvar, Croatia
- Hausen am Albis, Switzerland
- Niemcza, Poland

Letovice

- Chełmno, Poland
- Kirchlinteln, Germany
- Kőbánya (Budapest), Hungary
- Slepčany, Slovakia
- Stari Grad, Croatia

Lety

- Ailertchen, Germany

Lhenice

- Budča, Slovakia
- Gurbrü, Switzerland

=== Li ===
Libčany

- Le Mêle-sur-Sarthe, France

Libchavy

- Strzelin, Poland

Libčice nad Vltavou

- Moresco, Italy

Liberec

- Augsburg, Germany
- Nahariya, Israel
- Zittau, Germany

Lichkov

- Międzylesie, Poland

Lidice

- Coventry, England, United Kingdom
- Marzabotto, Italy

Lipník nad Bečvou

- Zdzieszowice, Poland

Lipová-lázně

- Krapkowice, Poland

Liptál

- Cañas, Costa Rica
- Tilarán, Costa Rica

Lišov

- Schüpfen, Switzerland
- Varmo, Italy

Litoměřice

- Armentières, France
- Calamba, Philippines
- Dapitan, Philippines
- Fulda, Germany
- Meissen, Germany

Litomyšl

- Levoča, Slovakia
- Noordenveld, Netherlands
- San Polo d'Enza, Italy

Litovel

- Littau (Lucerne), Switzerland
- Revúca, Slovakia
- Wieliczka, Poland

Litvínov

- Brie-Comte-Robert, France
- Olbernhau, Germany

=== Lo–Ly ===
Loket

- Illertissen, Germany

Lomnice

- Veľká Lomnica, Slovakia

Lomnice nad Lužnicí

- Bad Großpertholz, Austria
- Dießen am Ammersee, Germany

Loučná nad Desnou

- Sośnicowice, Poland

Louny

- Barendrecht, Netherlands
- Lučenec, Slovakia
- Moret-Loing-et-Orvanne, France
- Susaki, Japan
- Zschopau, Germany

Lovosice

- Coswig, Germany

Luby

- Bubenreuth, Germany
- Markneukirchen, Germany

Ludgeřovice

- Putnok, Hungary
- Tisovec, Slovakia

Luhačovice

- Piešťany, Slovakia
- Topoľčany, Slovakia
- Ustroń, Poland

Luka nad Jihlavou

- Forst, Germany
- Reutigen, Switzerland

Lužice

- Isdes, France

Lysá nad Labem

- Břeclav, Czech Republic
- Głogów Małopolski, Poland
- Kukeziv, Ukraine

== M ==
=== Ma–Me ===
Machov

- Radków, Poland

Malá Morávka

- Kobylnica, Poland
- Walce, Poland

Malá Skála

- Świerzawa, Poland

Malá Úpa

- Kowary, Poland

Mariánské Lázně

- Bad Homburg vor der Höhe, Germany
- Chianciano Terme, Italy
- Kiryat Motzkin, Israel
- Malvern, England, United Kingdom
- Marcoussis, France
- Weiden in der Oberpfalz, Germany

Medlov

- Borów, Poland

Mělník

- Lučenec, Slovakia
- Oranienburg, Germany
- Przeworsk, Poland
- Sandanski, Bulgaria
- Wetzikon, Switzerland

Město Albrechtice

- Biała, Poland
- Głubczyce, Poland
- Komprachcice, Poland
- Precenicco, Italy

Metylovice

- Krásno nad Kysucou, Slovakia

Meziboří

- Sayda, Germany
- Sogliano al Rubicone, Italy

=== Mi–Mn ===
Mikulov

- Bardejov, Slovakia
- Drasenhofen, Austria
- Galanta, Slovakia
- Novalja, Croatia
- Šumperk, Czech Republic
- Tuchów, Poland

Mikulovice

- Głuchołazy, Poland
- Pakosławice, Poland

Milevsko

- Münchenbuchsee, Switzerland

Milíkov

- Milówka, Poland

Milín

- Ledro, Italy

Milovice

- Conegliano, Italy
- Kistarcsa, Hungary
- Vynnyky, Ukraine
- Senec, Slovakia
- Wołów, Poland

Mimoň

- Nová Baňa, Slovakia
- Oelsnitz, Germany
- Złotoryja, Poland

Mirovice

- Bätterkinden, Switzerland

Mladá Boleslav

- Dieburg, Germany
- Pezinok, Slovakia
- Tiachiv, Ukraine
- Vantaa, Finland

Mnichovo Hradiště

- Chojnów, Poland
- Erzhausen, Germany
- Figline e Incisa Valdarno, Italy

=== Mo–My ===
Modrá

- Bojná, Slovakia
- Modra nad Cirochou, Slovakia
- Uhrovec, Slovakia

Mohelnice

- Radlin, Poland

Moravská Třebová

- Banská Štiavnica, Slovakia
- Staufenberg, Germany
- Vlaardingen, Netherlands

Moravské Budějovice

- Kalwaria Zebrzydowska, Poland
- Kautzen, Austria
- Pulkau, Austria
- Šaštín-Stráže, Slovakia

Moravský Beroun

- Bieruń, Poland
- Gundelfingen, Germany
- Meung-sur-Loire, France
- Ostroh, Ukraine
- Scheibenberg, Germany
- Teplička nad Váhom, Slovakia

Moravský Krumlov

- Przeworsk, Poland

Morkovice-Slížany

- Žitavany, Slovakia

Most

- Marienberg, Germany
- Meppel, Netherlands
- Pezinok, Slovakia
- Veszprém, Hungary

Myštice

- Riggisberg, Switzerland

Mýto

- Berga, Germany

== N ==
=== Na–Ni ===
Náchod

- Bauska, Latvia
- Halberstadt, Germany
- Kudowa-Zdrój, Poland
- Kłodzko, Poland
- Partizánske, Slovakia
- Persan, France
- Tiachiv, Ukraine
- Warrington, England, United Kingdom

Náklo

- Nakło nad Notecią, Poland

Náměšť na Hané

- Levice, Slovakia
- Szczytna, Poland

Náměšť nad Oslavou

- Medzilaborce, Slovakia

Napajedla

- Borský Mikuláš, Slovakia
- Kľak, Slovakia
- Ostrý Grúň, Slovakia

Nechanice

- Czarny Bór, Poland

Nejdek

- Johanngeorgenstadt, Germany

Nepomuk

- Anykščiai, Lithuania
- Bušince, Slovakia
- Hukvaldy, Czech Republic
- Kemnath, Germany
- Krupina, Slovakia
- Omiš, Croatia
- Roermond, Netherlands
- São João Nepomuceno, Brazil

Neratovice

- Radeberg, Germany

Netolice

- Ringelai, Germany

Nišovice

- Kallnach, Switzerland

=== No–Ny ===
Nová Bystřice

- Heidenreichstein, Austria

Nová Role

- Breitenbrunn, Germany

Nová Včelnice

- Eggiwil, Switzerland
- Neuötting, Germany

Nové Město na Moravě

- Mizhhiria, Ukraine
- Waalre, Netherlands
- Ziano di Fiemme, Italy

Nové Město nad Metují

- Duszniki-Zdrój, Poland
- Gârnic, Romania
- Hilden, Germany
- Warrington, England, United Kingdom

Nové Město pod Smrkem

- Leśna, Poland
- Mirsk, Poland
- Świeradów-Zdrój, Poland

Nové Sedlo

- Schwarzenberg, Germany

Nové Strašecí

- Welden, Germany

Novosedly nad Nežárkou

- Trub, Switzerland

Nový Bor

- Aniche, France
- Frauenau, Germany
- Zwiesel, Germany

Nový Bydžov

- Brezno, Slovakia
- Cascinette d'Ivrea, Italy
- Nădlac, Romania

Nový Jičín

- Épinal, France
- Görlitz, Germany
- Kremnica, Slovakia
- Ludwigsburg, Germany
- Novellara, Italy
- Świętochłowice, Poland

Nový Knín

- Ledro, Italy

Nový Malín

- Sobótka, Poland

Nymburk

- Neuruppin, Germany
- Porto San Giorgio, Italy
- Vrútky, Slovakia
- Żarów, Poland

Nýřany

- Zeulenroda-Triebes, Germany

== O ==
Odry

- Kuźnia Raciborska, Poland
- Niefern-Öschelbronn, Germany

Okříšky

- San Pier d'Isonzo, Italy

Oldřichov v Hájích

- Gozdnica, Poland

Olomouc

- Antony, France
- Kraków, Poland
- Kunming, China
- Lucerne, Switzerland
- Makarska, Croatia
- Nördlingen, Germany
- Old Town (Bratislava), Slovakia
- Owensboro, United States
- Pécs, Hungary
- Subotica, Serbia
- Tampere, Finland
- Treptow-Köpenick (Berlin), Germany
- Veenendaal, Netherlands

Oloví

- Kastl, Germany

Opatov

- Drezzo (Colverde), Italy

Opava

- Katowice, Poland
- Kearney, United States
- Liptovský Mikuláš, Slovakia
- Racibórz, Poland
- Roth, Germany
- Zugló (Budapest), Hungary
- Żywiec, Poland

Opočno

- Opoczno, Poland
- Puteaux, France
- Radków, Poland

Orlické Záhoří

- Bystrzyca Kłodzka, Poland

Orlová

- Crikvenica, Croatia
- Czechowice-Dziedzice, Poland
- Illnau-Effretikon, Switzerland
- Námestovo, Slovakia
- Rydułtowy, Poland

Osečná

- Krotoszyce, Poland
- Markersdorf, Germany

Oslavany

- Nováky, Slovakia
- Schkeuditz, Germany
- Vir, Croatia

Osoblaha

- Izbicko, Poland

Ostrava

- Abomey, Benin
- Coventry, England, United Kingdom
- Dnipro, Ukraine
- Dresden, Germany
- Gaziantep, Turkey
- Katowice, Poland
- Košice, Slovakia
- Miskolc, Hungary
- Oral, Kazakhstan
- Piraeus, Greece
- Pittsburgh, United States
- Shreveport, United States
- Split, Croatia

Ostrov

- Rastatt, Germany
- Wunsiedel, Germany

Otročiněves

- Laragh, Ireland

Otrokovice

- Dubnica nad Váhom, Slovakia
- Partizánske, Slovakia
- Vác, Hungary
- Zawadzkie, Poland

== P ==
=== Pa–Pl ===
Pacov

- Arni, Switzerland

Pardubice

- Bełchatów, Poland
- Çanakkale, Turkey
- Doetinchem, Netherlands
- Merano, Italy
- Pernik, Bulgaria
- Rosignano Marittimo, Italy
- Selb, Germany
- Skellefteå, Sweden
- Vysoké Tatry, Slovakia
- Zhytomyr, Ukraine

Pec pod Sněžkou

- Karpacz, Poland

Pelhřimov

- Dolný Kubín, Slovakia
- Mukachevo, Ukraine
- St. Valentin, Austria

Petrovice u Karviné

- Godów, Poland
- Zebrzydowice, Poland

Petřvald

- Jasienica, Poland
- Strumień, Poland

Písek

- Caerphilly, Wales, United Kingdom
- Deggendorf, Germany
- Lemvig, Denmark
- Smiltene, Latvia
- Veľký Krtíš, Slovakia
- Wetzlar, Germany

Planá

- Tirschenreuth, Germany

Planá nad Lužnicí

- Gorenja Vas–Poljane, Slovenia
- Hluk, Czech Republic

Plánice

- Rubigen, Switzerland

Plavy

- Paszowice, Poland

Plesná

- Bad Brambach, Germany
- Eichenzell, Germany
- Erbendorf, Germany
- Rosenthal am Rennsteig, Germany

Plzeň

- Birmingham, United States
- Liège, Belgium
- Limoges, France
- Regensburg, Germany
- Takasaki, Japan
- Winterthur, Switzerland
- Žilina, Slovakia

=== Po ===
Poběžovice

- Radelfingen, Switzerland
- Schönsee, Germany

Počátky

- Konolfingen, Switzerland
- Lokca, Slovakia

Podbořany

- Ehrenfriedersdorf, Germany
- Russi, Italy
- Spalt, Germany

Poděbrady

- Celldömölk, Hungary
- Netanya, Israel
- Piešťany, Slovakia
- Tharandt, Germany
- Vertou, France
- Wołomin, Poland

Podolí

- Ay-sur-Moselle, France
- Kuchyňa, Slovakia

Pohořelice

- Brezová pod Bradlom, Slovakia
- Poraj, Poland

Pohoří

- Piława Górna, Poland

Police nad Metují

- Colli al Metauro, Italy
- Świdnica, Poland
- Travnik, Bosnia and Herzegovina

Polička

- Ebes, Hungary
- Hohenems, Austria
- Westerveld, Netherlands

Polná

- Wimmis, Switzerland

Popovice

- Kálnica, Slovakia

Postoloprty

- Wolkenstein, Germany

Postřekov

- Ascha, Germany
- Pakrac, Croatia

Postřelmov

- Kamenec pod Vtáčnikom, Slovakia
- Moyenneville, France
- Willingham by Stow, England, United Kingdom

Potštejn

- Pottenstein, Austria
- Pottenstein, Germany

Pozlovice

- Rajecké Teplice, Slovakia

Pozořice

- Ivanka pri Dunaji, Slovakia

=== Pr–Pt ===
Prachatice

- Akhmeta, Georgia
- Castrocaro Terme e Terra del Sole, Italy
- Grainet, Germany
- Ignalina, Lithuania
- Impruneta, Italy
- Mauthausen, Austria
- Waldkirchen, Germany
- Zvolen, Slovakia

Prague

- Berlin, Germany
- Brussels, Belgium
- Chicago, United States
- Frankfurt am Main, Germany
- Hamburg, Germany
- Kyoto, Japan
- Miami-Dade County, United States
- Nuremberg, Germany
- Phoenix, United States
- Taipei, Taiwan

Prague 1

- Bamberg, Germany
- Batumi, Georgia
- Budavár (Budapest), Hungary
- Chaoyang (Beijing), China
- Ferrara, Italy
- Innere Stadt (Vienna), Austria
- Jongno (Seoul), South Korea
- Monza, Italy
- Nîmes, France
- Old Town (Bratislava), Slovakia
- Orvieto, Italy
- Rosh HaAyin, Israel
- Trento, Italy

Prague 4

- Budva, Montenegro
- Snina, Slovakia
- Trešnjevka (Zagreb), Croatia

Prague 5

- Arad, Romania
- Kallithea, Greece
- Neukölln (Berlin), Germany
- Petržalka (Bratislava), Slovakia
- Saugues, France
- Savski Venac (Belgrade), Serbia
- Trogir, Croatia
- Újbuda (Budapest), Hungary

Prague 6

- Bayreuth, Germany
- Dijon, France
- Drancy, France
- Khmelnytskyi, Ukraine
- Penzing (Vienna), Austria
- Poreč, Croatia
- Roncegno Terme, Italy
- Ružomberok, Slovakia

Prague 7

- Nové Mesto (Bratislava), Slovakia
- Teramo, Italy

Prague 8

- Old Town (Košice), Slovakia

Prague 9

- Anenii Noi District, Moldova

Prague 10

- Jasło, Poland
- Prešov, Slovakia

Prague 15

- Daruvar, Croatia
- Žilina, Slovakia

Prague 16 – Radotín

- Burglengenfeld, Germany

Prague 18 – Letňany

- Beautor, France

Prague 20 – Horní Počernice

- Brunsbüttel, Germany
- Mions, France

Prague – Řeporyje

- Hostomel, Ukraine

Pražmo

- Niemodlin, Poland

Přerov

- Bardejov, Slovakia
- Cuijk, Netherlands
- Děčín, Czech Republic
- Ivano-Frankivsk, Ukraine
- Kedzierzyn-Kozle, Poland
- Kotor, Montenegro
- Ozimek, Poland

Přestanov

- Drebach, Germany

Přeštice

- Chadron, United States
- Krško, Slovenia
- Nittenau, Germany

Příbor

- Przedbórz, Poland

Příbram

- Anor, France
- Freiberg, Germany
- Hoorn, Netherlands
- Kežmarok, Slovakia
- Königs Wusterhausen, Germany
- Ledro, Italy
- Villerupt, France

Přibyslav

- Mook en Middelaar, Netherlands
- Sliač, Slovakia

Přimda

- Pfreimd, Germany

Prostějov

- Środa Wielkopolska, Poland
- Vysoké Tatry, Slovakia

Protivín

- Blackwood, Wales, United Kingdom

Provodov

- Lednické Rovne, Slovakia

Ptice

- Ledro, Italy

== R ==
=== Ra–Ri ===
Radomyšl

- Montoggio, Italy

Radslavice

- Raslavice, Slovakia

Rakovice

- Rakovice, Slovakia

Rakovník

- Dietzenbach, Germany
- Kościan, Poland
- Kráľovský Chlmec, Slovakia

Rapotín

- Opatovce nad Nitrou, Slovakia
- Paszowice, Poland

Raspenava

- Bischofswerda, Germany
- Gryfów Śląski, Poland

Ratíškovice

- Vouziers, France

Řeka

- Nová Bystrica, Slovakia
- Stará Bystrica, Slovakia

Říčany

- Albertslund, Denmark
- Borken, Germany
- Dainville, France
- Grabow, Germany
- Opatówek, Poland
- Whitstable, England, United Kingdom

=== Ro ===
Ročov

- Reichenbach im Vogtland, Germany

Rokycany

- Greiz, Germany
- Pfinztal, Germany

Rokytnice nad Jizerou

- Wojcieszów, Poland

Ropice

- Jaworze, Poland
- Pribylina, Slovakia

Rosice

- Lainate, Italy
- Rimóc, Hungary
- Strenči, Latvia

Rotava

- Veitshöchheim, Germany

Roudnice nad Labem

- Dessau-Roßlau, Germany
- Ruelle-sur-Touvre, France

Rousínov

- Dervio, Italy
- Halásztelek, Hungary
- Podbranč, Slovakia

Rožmberk nad Vltavou

- Freistadt, Austria

Rožnov pod Radhoštěm

- Bergen, Germany
- Körmend, Hungary
- Považská Bystrica, Slovakia
- Śrem, Poland

Roztoky

- Skawina, Poland

=== Rt–Ry ===
Rtyně v Podkrkonoší

- Elstra, Germany
- Jelcz-Laskowice, Poland

Ruda nad Moravou

- Kanianka, Slovakia

Rudolfov

- Sandl, Austria

Rusín

- Głubczyce, Poland

Rychnov nad Kněžnou

- Kłodzko, Poland

Rýmařov

- Arco, Italy
- Belœil, Belgium
- Crosne, France
- Krompachy, Slovakia
- Ozimek, Poland
- Rajec, Slovakia
- Schotten, Germany
- Zeil am Main, Germany

== S ==
=== Sa–Sk ===
Šatov

- Semerovo, Slovakia

Sebranice

- Zlatá Baňa, Slovakia

Seč

- Radzovce, Slovakia

Sedlčany

- Taverny, France
- Wągrowiec County, Poland

Semily

- Kolochava, Ukraine
- Schauenburg, Germany

Šenov

- Strumień, Poland

Sezemice

- Neuville-Saint-Vaast, France

Sezimovo Ústí

- Thierachern, Switzerland

Skalice u České Lípy

- Bertsdorf-Hörnitz, Germany

Skalná

- Neusorg, Germany

=== Sl–Sp ===
Slaný

- Pegnitz, Germany
- Skalica, Slovakia

Šlapanice

- Braine-l'Alleud, Belgium

Slatiňany

- Freienstein-Teufen, Switzerland
- Likavka, Slovakia
- Rorbas, Switzerland

Slavičín

- Horná Súča, Slovakia
- Horné Srnie, Slovakia
- Nová Dubnica, Slovakia
- Uhrovec, Slovakia

Slavkov u Brna

- Darney, France
- Horn, Austria
- Pag, Croatia
- Sławków, Poland
- Zeist, Netherlands

Slavonice

- Bogen, Germany
- Dobersberg, Austria
- Stakčín, Slovakia

Slopné

- Slopná, Slovakia

Sloup v Čechách

- Stolpen, Germany

Smiřice

- Boguszów-Gorce, Poland

Smržovka

- Rammenau, Germany
- Weidenberg, Germany

Soběslav

- Sabinov, Slovakia

Sobotka

- Sobótka, Poland
- Wadern, Germany

Sokolov

- Saalfeld, Germany
- Schwandorf, Germany

Spálené Poříčí

- Ralbitz-Rosenthal, Germany

Špindlerův Mlýn

- Alanya, Turkey
- Podgórzyn, Poland

=== St ===
Stará Ves nad Ondřejnicí

- Lipowa, Poland
- Raková, Slovakia

Staré Město (Šumperk District)

- Stronie Śląskie, Poland

Staré Město (Uherské Hradiště District)

- Sées, France
- Tönisvorst, Germany

Staré Město pod Landštejnem

- Rača (Bratislava), Slovakia

Starý Hrozenkov

- Darłowo, Poland

Starý Poddvorov is a member of the Charter of European Rural Communities, a town twinning association across the European Union, alongside with:

- Bienvenida, Spain
- Bièvre, Belgium
- Bucine, Italy
- Cashel, Ireland
- Cissé, France
- Desborough, England, United Kingdom
- Esch (Haaren), Netherlands
- Hepstedt, Germany
- Ibănești, Romania
- Kandava (Tukums), Latvia
- Kannus, Finland
- Kolindros, Greece
- Lassee, Austria
- Medzev, Slovakia
- Næstved, Denmark
- Nagycenk, Hungary
- Nadur, Malta
- Ockelbo, Sweden
- Pano Lefkara, Cyprus
- Põlva, Estonia
- Samuel (Soure), Portugal
- Strzyżów, Poland
- Svoge, Bulgaria
- Tisno, Croatia
- Troisvierges, Luxembourg
- Žagarė (Joniškis), Lithuania

Štěchovice

- Kalmthout, Belgium
- San Juan Nepomuceno, Paraguay

Štěpánkovice

- Štrba, Slovakia

Štěpánov

- Środa Śląska, Poland

Šternberk

- Dobšiná, Slovakia
- Günzburg, Germany
- Kobiór, Poland
- Kungsbacka, Sweden
- Lorsch, Germany

Štítná nad Vláří-Popov

- Košeca, Slovakia

Štíty

- Belvedere Ostrense, Italy
- Niemodlin, Poland

Stochov

- Bourbon-Lancy, France
- Saarwellingen, Germany

Strahovice

- Krzanowice, Poland
- Ruppach-Goldhausen, Germany

Strakonice

- Bad Salzungen, Germany
- Calderdale, England, United Kingdom
- Lengnau, Switzerland

Strání

- Euratsfeld, Austria

Strašice

- Hohenfels, Germany

Strážnice

- Skalica, Slovakia

Střelice

- Assago, Italy
- Nozay, France

Stříbro

- Fano, Italy
- Moncoutant, France
- Oelsnitz, Germany
- Vohenstrauß, Germany

Strmilov

- Trubschachen, Switzerland

Strunkovice nad Blanicí

- Stocken-Höfen, Switzerland
- Verkhnii Bystryi, Ukraine

Studená

- Beemster, Netherlands

Studenec

- Zuberec, Slovakia

Studénka

- Dąbrowa Górnicza, Poland

=== Su–Sv ===
Suchdol nad Lužnicí

- Brand-Nagelberg, Austria

Sudice

- Pietrowice Wielkie, Poland

Šumperk

- Bad Hersfeld, Germany
- Ebreichsdorf, Austria
- Maarssen (Stichtse Vecht), Netherlands
- Mikulov, Czech Republic
- Nysa, Poland
- Prievidza, Slovakia
- Sulmona, Italy
- Vaasa, Finland

Sušice is a member of the Douzelage, a town twinning association of towns across the European Union. Sušice also has two other twin towns.

Douzelage

- Agros, Cyprus
- Altea, Spain
- Asikkala, Finland
- Bad Kötzting, Germany
- Bellagio, Italy
- Bundoran, Ireland
- Chojna, Poland
- Granville, France
- Holstebro, Denmark
- Houffalize, Belgium
- Judenburg, Austria
- Kőszeg, Hungary
- Marsaskala, Malta
- Meerssen, Netherlands
- Niederanven, Luxembourg
- Oxelösund, Sweden
- Preveza, Greece
- Rokiškis, Lithuania
- Rovinj, Croatia
- Sesimbra, Portugal
- Sherborne, England, United Kingdom
- Sigulda, Latvia
- Siret, Romania
- Škofja Loka, Slovenia
- Tryavna, Bulgaria
- Türi, Estonia
- Zvolen, Slovakia

Other

- Uetendorf, Switzerland
- Wenzenbach, Germany

Svatý Jan nad Malší

- Grünbach, Austria

Světlá Hora

- Polska Cerekiew, Poland
- Rieste, Germany

Svitavy

- Lądek-Zdrój, Poland
- Perechyn, Ukraine
- Stendal, Germany
- Strzelin, Poland
- Žiar nad Hronom, Slovakia

== T ==
Tábor

- Dole, France
- Konstanz, Germany
- Nové Zámky, Slovakia
- Orinda, United States
- Škofja Loka, Slovenia
- Wels, Austria

Tanvald

- Burbach, Germany
- Lubomierz, Poland
- Marcinowice, Poland
- Wittichenau, Germany

Telč

- Belp, Switzerland
- Figeac, France
- Rothenburg ob der Tauber, Germany
- Šaľa, Slovakia
- Waidhofen an der Thaya, Austria
- Wilber, United States

Teplá

- Konnersreuth, Germany

Teplice nad Bečvou

- Šmarješke Toplice, Slovenia

Teplice nad Metují

- Jaworzyna Śląska, Poland

Terezín

- Dębno, Poland
- Komárno, Slovakia
- Strausberg, Germany

Těrlicko

- Chybie, Poland

Těšany

- Ruše, Slovenia

Tišnov

- Moldava nad Bodvou, Slovakia
- Sereď, Slovakia
- Sulejów, Poland

Tlučná

- Floß, Germany

Třebechovice pod Orebem

- Bethlehem, Palestine

Třebíč

- Humenné, Slovakia
- Lilienfeld, Austria
- Oschatz, Germany
- Rakhiv, Ukraine
- Yichang, China

Třeboň

- Freyung-Grafenau (district), Germany
- Interlaken, Switzerland
- Schrems, Austria
- Utena, Lithuania

Třešť

- Obergünzburg, Germany

Třinec

- Bielsko-Biała, Poland
- Žilina, Slovakia

Trmice

- Königstein, Germany

Trpín

- Palkonya, Hungary

Trutnov

- Kamienna Góra, Poland
- Kępno, Poland
- Lohfelden, Germany
- Senica, Slovakia
- Strzelin, Poland
- Świdnica, Poland
- Würzburg, Germany

Tupesy

- Nedašovce, Slovakia

Turnov

- Alvesta, Sweden
- Idar-Oberstein, Germany
- Jawor, Poland
- Keszthely, Hungary
- Murska Sobota, Slovenia
- Niesky, Germany

Týniště nad Orlicí

- Čierny Balog, Slovakia

== U ==
Uherské Hradiště

- Bridgwater, England, United Kingdom
- Krosno, Poland
- Mayen, Germany
- Sárvár, Hungary
- Skalica, Slovakia

Uherský Brod

- Nové Mesto nad Váhom, Slovakia
- Šamorín, Slovakia

Uherský Ostroh

- Trenčianska Teplá, Slovakia

Uničov

- Bieruń-Lędziny County, Poland
- Dubno, Ukraine
- Jelšava, Slovakia
- Lędziny, Poland
- Roccagorga, Italy

Úpice

- Piechowice, Poland

Úsov

- Lazany, Slovakia

Ústí nad Labem

- Chemnitz, Germany
- Halton, England, United Kingdom

Ústí nad Orlicí

- Amberg, Germany
- Bystrzyca Kłodzka, Poland
- Massa Martana, Italy
- Neukölln (Berlin), Germany
- Poprad, Slovakia

Úvalno

- Branice, Poland

== V ==
=== Va–Ve ===
Valašské Klobouky

- Zelów, Poland

Valašské Meziříčí

- Balchik, Bulgaria
- Budva, Montenegro
- Čačak, Serbia
- Čadca, Slovakia
- Gooise Meren, Netherlands
- Konin, Poland
- Partizánske, Slovakia
- Sevlievo, Bulgaria
- Velké Meziříčí, Czech Republic

Valeč

- Drebach, Germany

Vejprty

- Bärenstein, Germany

Velichovky

- Jedlina-Zdrój, Poland

Velká Bíteš

- Hanušovce nad Topľou, Slovakia

Velká Kraš

- Neuburg an der Donau, Germany

Velká nad Veličkou

- Nowy Dwór Gdański, Poland

Velká Polom

- Dlhá nad Oravou, Slovakia

Velké Bílovice

- Presidencia Roque Sáenz Peña, Argentina
- Šenkvice, Slovakia

Velké Meziříčí

- České Meziříčí, Czech Republic
- Tisno, Croatia
- Valašské Meziříčí, Czech Republic
- Vansbro, Sweden

Velké Opatovice

- Elbingerode, Germany
- Stari Grad, Croatia

Velké Pavlovice

- Senica, Slovakia
- Ždírec nad Doubravou, Czech Republic

Velké Přílepy

- Zlaté Moravce, Slovakia

Velký Šenov

- Lwówek Śląski, Poland

Vendryně

- Goleszów, Poland

Veřovice

- Hendungen, Germany
- Lampertswalde, Germany

Veselí nad Lužnicí

- Diemtigen, Switzerland
- Yspertal, Austria

Veselí nad Moravou

- Crespellano (Valsamoggia), Italy
- Malacky, Slovakia
- Żnin, Poland

Větřní

- Lotzwil, Switzerland

=== Vi–Vy ===
Vidnava

- Neuburg an der Donau, Germany

Vigantice

- Ludrová, Slovakia

Vimperk

- Freyung, Germany

Vítkov

- Kalety, Poland
- Vrbové, Slovakia

Vlachovo Březí

- Sankt Oswald-Riedlhütte, Germany

Vlčice

- Biała, Poland

Vodňany

- Oravský Podzámok, Slovakia
- Sieraków, Poland
- Wartberg ob der Aist, Austria
- Zlaté Hory, Czech Republic

Volary

- Grainet, Germany
- Waldkirchen, Germany
- Wallern an der Trattnach, Austria

Volyně

- Aidenbach, Germany
- Kováčová, Slovakia

Vratimov

- Senj, Croatia

Vrbno pod Pradědem

- Głogówek, Poland

Vrchlabí

- Baunatal, Germany
- Kowary, Poland
- Trouville-sur-Mer, France

Vřesina

- Kornowac, Poland

Všeň

- Ledro, Italy

Všeradice

- Gârnic, Romania

Vsetín

- Bytom, Poland
- Mödling, Austria
- Stará Ľubovňa, Slovakia
- Trenčianske Teplice, Slovakia
- Vrgorac, Croatia

Vyškov

- Cognac, France
- Döbeln, Germany
- Jarosław, Poland
- Michalovce, Slovakia
- Virovitica, Croatia

Vysoké Mýto

- Dolni Chiflik, Bulgaria
- Korbach, Germany
- Odessos District (Varna), Bulgaria
- Ozorków, Poland
- Pyrzyce, Poland
- Spišská Belá, Slovakia

== Z ==
Zábřeh

- Handlová, Slovakia
- Ochsenfurt, Germany

Žacléř

- Goldkronach, Germany
- Kowary, Poland
- Lubawka, Poland

Žamberk

- Fresagrandinaria, Italy
- Nowa Sól, Poland
- Püttlingen, Germany
- Rice Lake, United States
- Saint-Michel-sur-Orge, France
- Senftenberg, Germany
- Senftenberg, Austria
- Veszprém, Hungary

Žarošice

- Snina, Slovakia

Zašová

- Nová Ľubovňa, Slovakia

Žatec

- Krasnystaw, Poland
- Poperinge, Belgium
- Thum, Germany
- Žalec, Slovenia

Žďár nad Sázavou

- Cairanne, France
- Flobecq, Belgium
- Khust, Ukraine
- Leszno, Poland
- Schmölln, Germany

Ždírec nad Doubravou

- Michelhausen, Austria
- Velké Pavlovice, Czech Republic

Zdobnice

- Bystrzyca Kłodzka, Poland

Železná Ruda

- Aldeno, Italy
- Bayerisch Eisenstein, Germany
- Zernez, Switzerland

Železnice

- Revò, Italy

Železný Brod

- Lauscha, Germany
- Olszyna, Poland

Želiv

- Kiesen, Switzerland

Židlochovice

- Gbely, Slovakia
- Montevago, Italy

Žinkovy

- Großheringen, Germany

Žirovnice

- Grosshöchstetten, Switzerland
- Trstená, Slovakia

Zlaté Hory

- Głuchołazy, Poland
- Kętrzyn, Poland
- Vodňany, Czech Republic

Zlín

- Altenburg, Germany
- Chorzów, Poland
- Groningen, Netherlands
- Izegem, Belgium
- Limbach-Oberfrohna, Germany
- Möhlin, Switzerland
- Partizánske, Slovakia
- Romans-sur-Isère, France
- Sesto San Giovanni, Italy
- Trenčín, Slovakia

Žlutice

- Hurbanovo, Slovakia
- Warmensteinach, Germany

Znojmo

- Chrudim, Czech Republic
- Nové Zámky, Slovakia
- Pontassieve, Italy
- Povo (Trento), Italy
- Retz, Austria
- Ružinov (Bratislava), Slovakia
- Strzegom, Poland
- Torgau, Germany
- Villazzano (Trento), Italy

Zubří

- Furth an der Triesting, Austria
- Palárikovo, Slovakia
- Považská Bystrica, Slovakia
- Rosdorf, Germany
