= Králova Lhota =

Králova Lhota may refer to places in the Czech Republic:

- Králova Lhota (Písek District), a municipality and village in the South Bohemian Region
- Králova Lhota (Rychnov nad Kněžnou District), a municipality and village in the Hradec Králové Region

== See also ==
- Kráľova Lehota in Slovakia
- Lhota
