= Střelice =

Střelice may refer to places in the Czech Republic:

- Střelice (Brno-Country District), a municipality and village in the South Moravian Region
- Střelice (Plzeň-South District), a municipality and village in the Plzeň Region
- Střelice (Znojmo District), a municipality and village in the South Moravian Region
- Střelice, a village and part of Uničov in the Olomouc Region
