= Strelitz =

Strelitz refers to:

- Duchy of Mecklenburg-Strelitz, former German duchy
- Grand Duchy of Mecklenburg-Strelitz, successor to the duchy
- Free State of Mecklenburg-Strelitz, state of Weimar Germany
- Mecklenburg-Strelitz (district), former district in Mecklenburg-Vorpommern, Germany
- Neustrelitz, city in Mecklenburg-Vorpommern, Germany
- Strelitz-Alt, part of Neustrelitz
- Strelitz, the German name of Střelice u Stoda, Czech Republic
- Strelitz, the German name of Strzelce, Greater Poland Voivodeship, Poland
- Strelitz, a camp at Cargill, Perthshire, Scotland, for soldiers after the Seven Years' War, in 1763
- Johannes Strelitz (1912–1991), German jurist

== See also ==
- Streltsy
