= Tupesy =

- Municipality
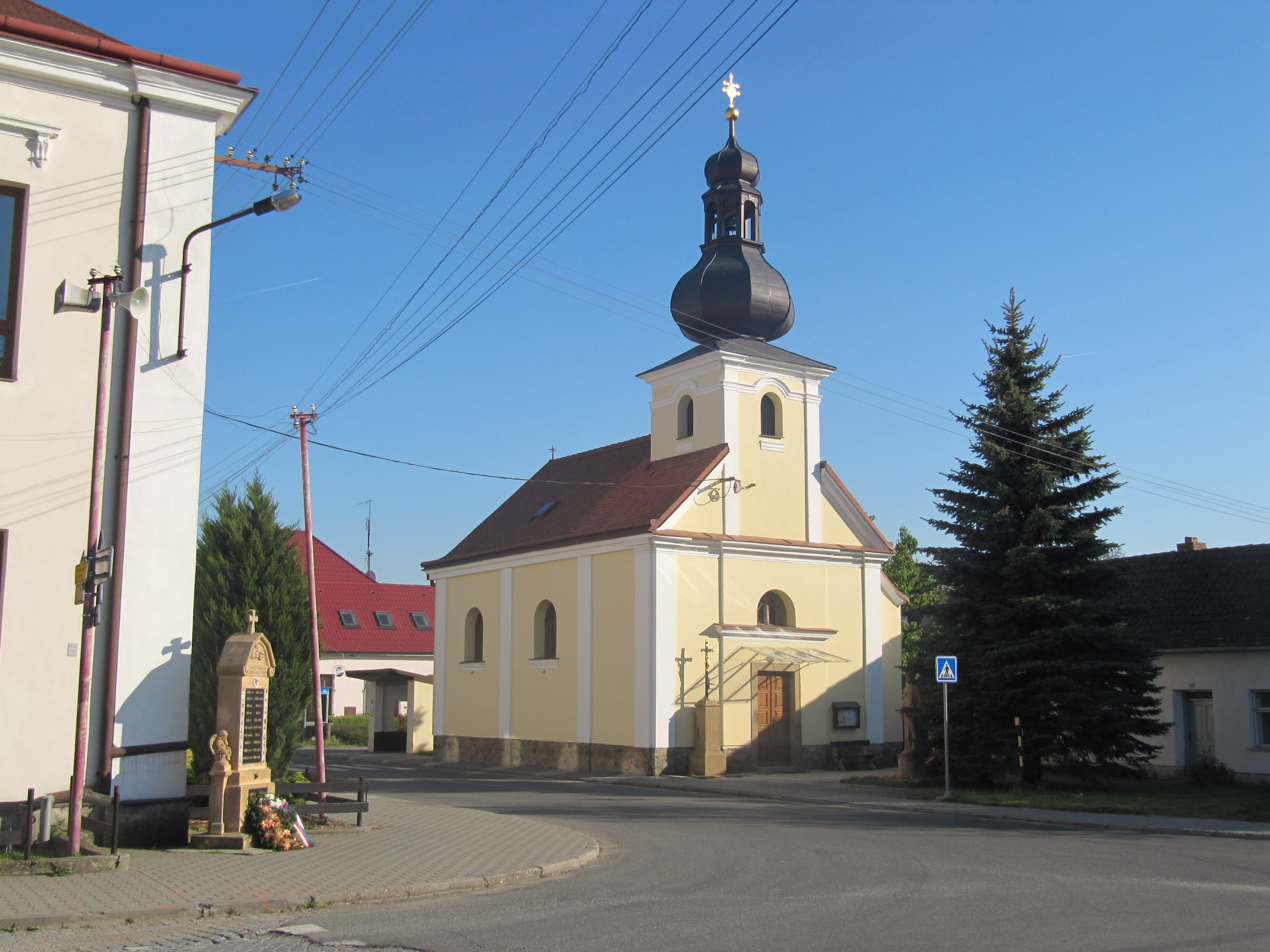
- Chapel of the Visitation of the Virgin Mary

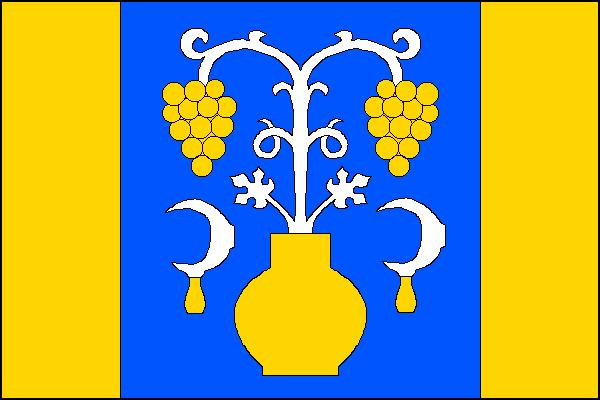
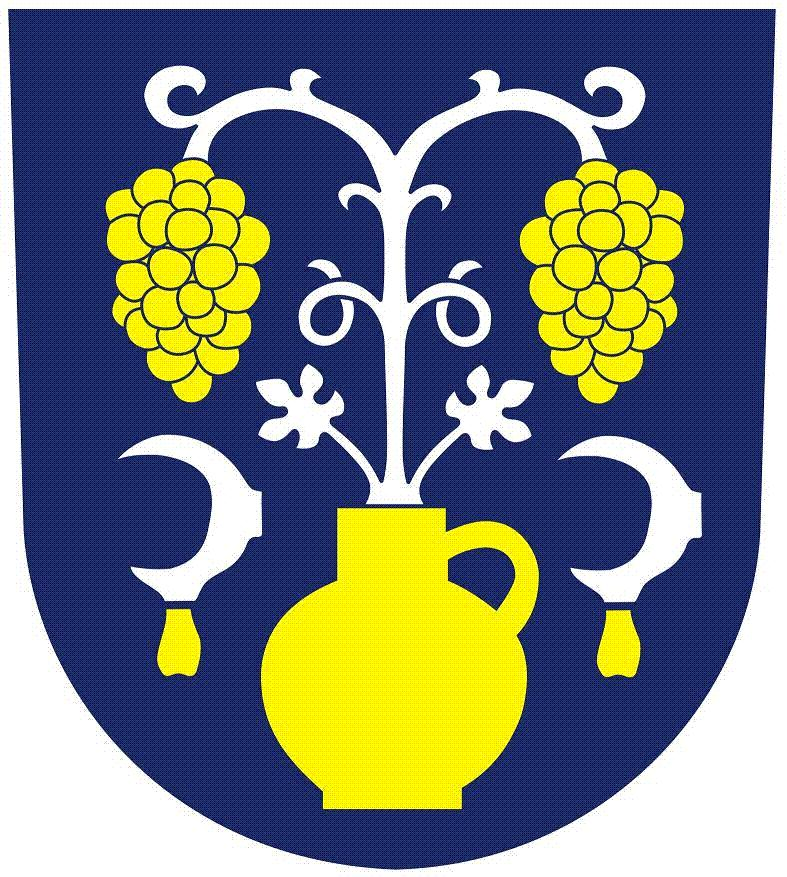
- Flag Coat of arms

- Location in the Czech Republic
- Coordinates: 49°5′3″N 17°22′11″E
- Country: Czech Republic
- Region: Zlín
- District: Uherské Hradiště
- First mentioned: 1220

Area
  - Total: 5.83 km^{2} (2.25 sq mi)
- Elevation: 219 m (719 ft)

Population (2026-01-01)
  - Total: 1,096
  - Density: 188/km^{2} (487/sq mi)
- Time zone: UTC+1 (CET)
  - Summer (DST): UTC+2 (CEST)
- Postal code: 687 07
- Website: www.tupesy.cz

Tupesy is a municipality and village in Uherské Hradiště District in the Zlín Region of the Czech Republic. It has about 1,100 inhabitants.

Tupesy lies approximately 7 kilometres (4 mi) west of Uherské Hradiště, 27 km (17 mi) south-west of Zlín, and 241 km (150 mi) south-east of Prague.

== Demographics ==
Historical population
Year	Pop.	±%
1869	1,128	—
1880	1,185	+5.1%
1890	1,297	+9.5%
1900	1,362	+5.0%
1910	1,338	−1.8%
1921	1,412	+5.5%
1930	1,328	−5.9%
1950	1,352	+1.8%
1961	1,474	+9.0%
1970	1,260	−14.5%
1980	1,123	−10.9%
1991	1,074	−4.4%
2001	1,087	+1.2%
2011	1,080	−0.6%
2021	1,095	+1.4%
Source: Censuses

== Twin towns – sister cities ==
Tupesy is twinned with:

- Nedašovce, Slovakia
