= Sebranice (Svitavy District) =

- Municipality
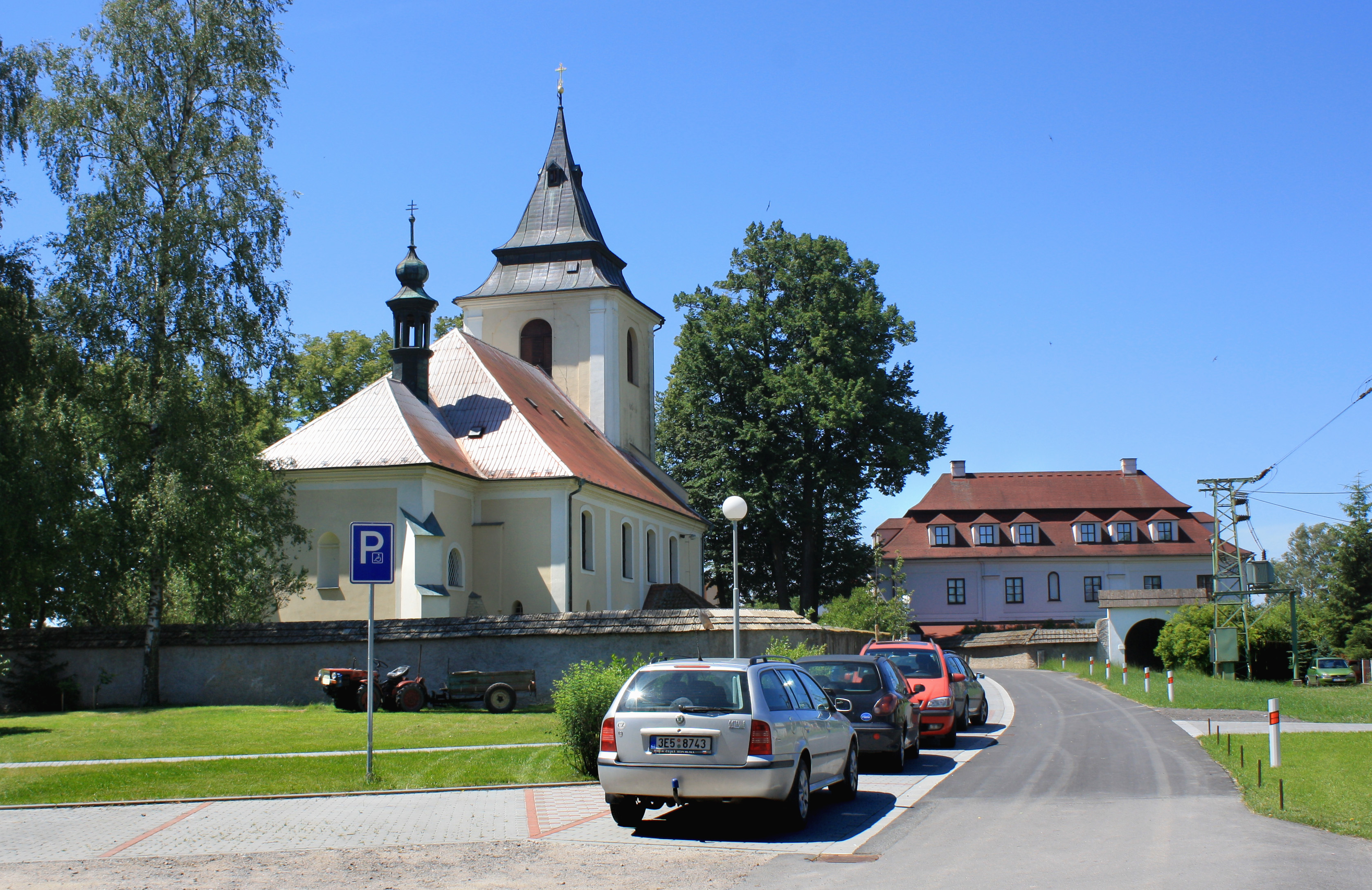
- Church of Saint Nicolas and presbytery

- Flag Coat of arms

- Location in the Czech Republic
- Coordinates: 49°46′17″N 16°14′57″E
- Country: Czech Republic
- Region: Pardubice
- District: Svitavy
- First mentioned: 1347

Area
  - Total: 11.69 km^{2} (4.51 sq mi)
- Elevation: 482 m (1,581 ft)

Population (2026-01-01)
  - Total: 959
  - Density: 82.0/km^{2} (212/sq mi)
- Time zone: UTC+1 (CET)
  - Summer (DST): UTC+2 (CEST)
- Postal codes: 569 62, 572 01
- Website: www.sebranice.cz

Sebranice is a municipality and village in Svitavy District in the Pardubice Region of the Czech Republic. It has about 1,000 inhabitants.

== Administrative division ==
Sebranice consists of two municipal parts (in brackets population according to the 2021 census):

- Sebranice (913)
- Vysoký Les (13)

== Etymology ==
The name is derived from the Czech word sebrán ('gathered', 'collected'). The name meant that people gathered from all over the surrounding area lived here.

== Geography ==
Sebranice is located about 15 kilometres (9 mi) west of Svitavy and 44 km (27 mi) southeast of Pardubice. It lies in the Svitavy Uplands. The highest point is at 567 m (1,860 ft) above sea level. The village lies in the valley of the stream Jalový potok.

== History ==
The first written mention of Sebranice is from 1347. The municipality was created by merger of the villages of Sebranice, Pohora and Kaliště and the hamlets of Vysoký Les and Třemošná in 1950.

== Demographics ==
Historical population

Year	Pop.	±%
1869	1,314	—
1880	1,277	−2.8%
1890	1,183	−7.4%
1900	1,214	+2.6%
1910	1,256	+3.5%

Year	Pop.	±%
1921	1,192	−5.1%
1930	1,202	+0.8%
1950	851	−29.2%
1961	836	−1.8%
1970	772	−7.7%

Year	Pop.	±%
1980	757	−1.9%
1991	812	+7.3%
2001	861	+6.0%
2011	950	+10.3%
2021	926	−2.5%

Source: Censuses

== Transport ==
There are no railways or major roads passing through the municipality.

== Sights ==
The main landmark of Sebranice is the Church of Saint Nicholas. It was originally a late Gothic church from the second half of the 13th century, baroque rebuilt in the late 17th and early 18th centuries. The tower was added in 1768.

== Twin towns – sister cities ==
Sebranice is twinned with:

- Zlatá Baňa, Slovakia
