= Grainet =

- Municipality
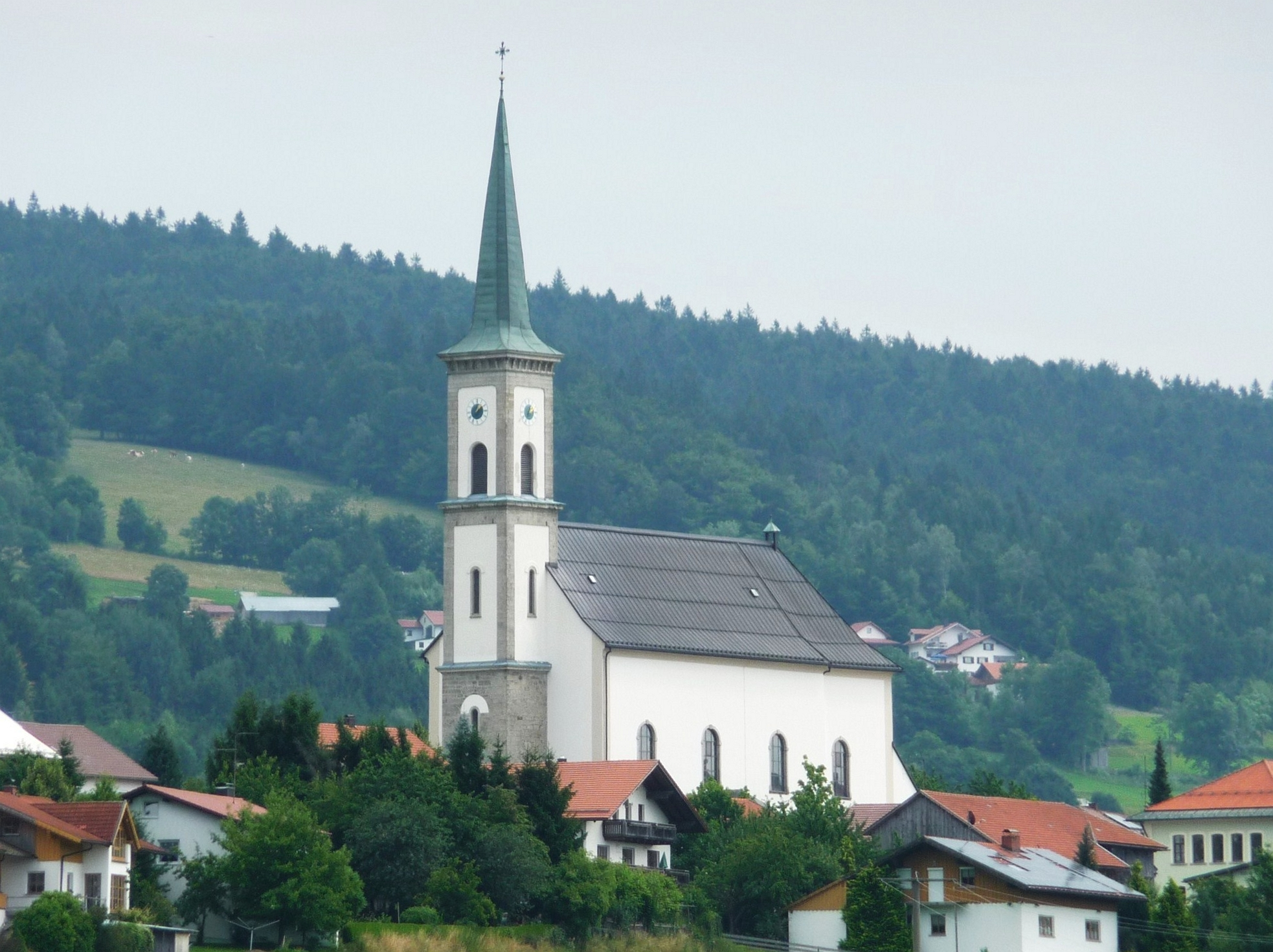
- Church in Grainet

- Coat of arms

- Location of Grainet within Freyung-Grafenau district
- Interactive map of Grainet
- Location within Germany Location within Bavaria
- Coordinates: 48°48′N 13°39′E
- Country: Germany
- State: Bavaria
- Admin. region: Niederbayern
- District: Freyung-Grafenau

Government
  - Mayor (2020–26): Jürgen Schano (CSU)

Area
  - Total: 36.16 km^{2} (13.96 sq mi)
- Elevation: 582–1,015 m (1,909–3,330 ft)

Population (2025-12-31)
  - Total: 2,475
  - Density: 68.45/km^{2} (177.3/sq mi)
- Time zone: UTC+01:00 (CET)
  - Summer (DST): UTC+02:00 (CEST)
- Postal codes: 94143
- Dialling codes: 08585
- Vehicle registration: FRG
- Website: www.grainet.de

Grainet is a municipality in the district of Freyung-Grafenau in Bavaria in Germany.
