= Králova Lhota (Písek District) =

- Municipality
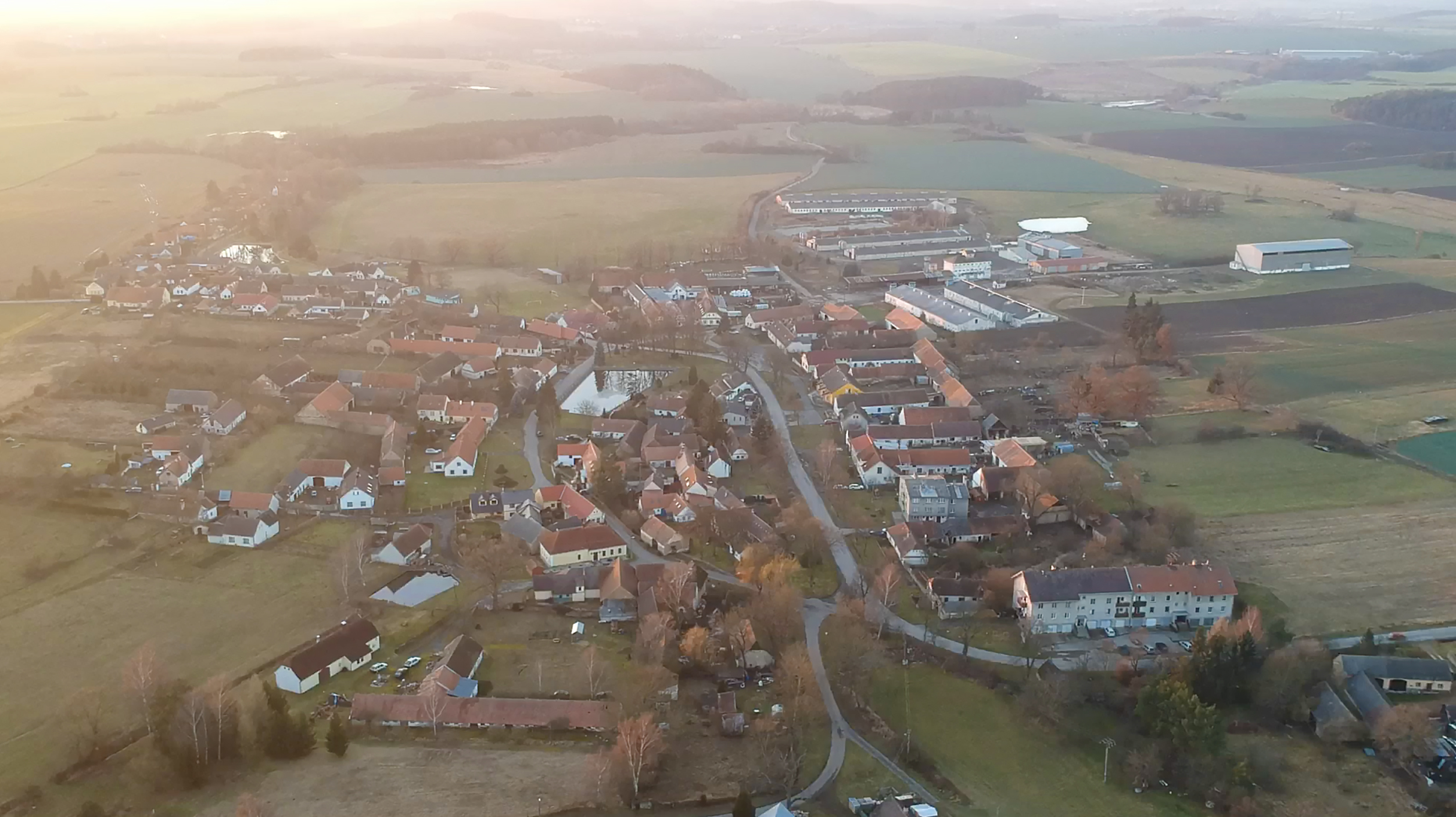
- Aerial view

- Location in the Czech Republic
- Coordinates: 49°29′45″N 14°6′38″E
- Country: Czech Republic
- Region: South Bohemian
- District: Písek
- First mentioned: 1361

Area
  - Total: 10.82 km^{2} (4.18 sq mi)
- Elevation: 444 m (1,457 ft)

Population (2026-01-01)
  - Total: 194
  - Density: 17.9/km^{2} (46.4/sq mi)
- Time zone: UTC+1 (CET)
  - Summer (DST): UTC+2 (CEST)
- Postal code: 398 04
- Website: kralovalhota.eu

Králova Lhota is a municipality and village in Písek District in the South Bohemian Region of the Czech Republic. It has about 200 inhabitants.

Králova Lhota lies approximately 22 kilometres (14 mi) north of Písek, 64 km (40 mi) north-west of České Budějovice, and 70 km (43 mi) south of Prague.

== Administrative division ==
Králova Lhota consists of two municipal parts (in brackets population according to the 2021 census):

- Králova Lhota (136)
- Laziště (66)

== Demographics ==
Historical population
Year	Pop.	±%
1869	723	—
1880	706	−2.4%
1890	674	−4.5%
1900	667	−1.0%
1910	643	−3.6%
1921	617	−4.0%
1930	567	−8.1%
1950	399	−29.6%
1961	393	−1.5%
1970	332	−15.5%
1980	301	−9.3%
1991	261	−13.3%
2001	209	−19.9%
2011	205	−1.9%
2021	202	−1.5%
Source: Censuses
