= Kanianka =

- Municipality
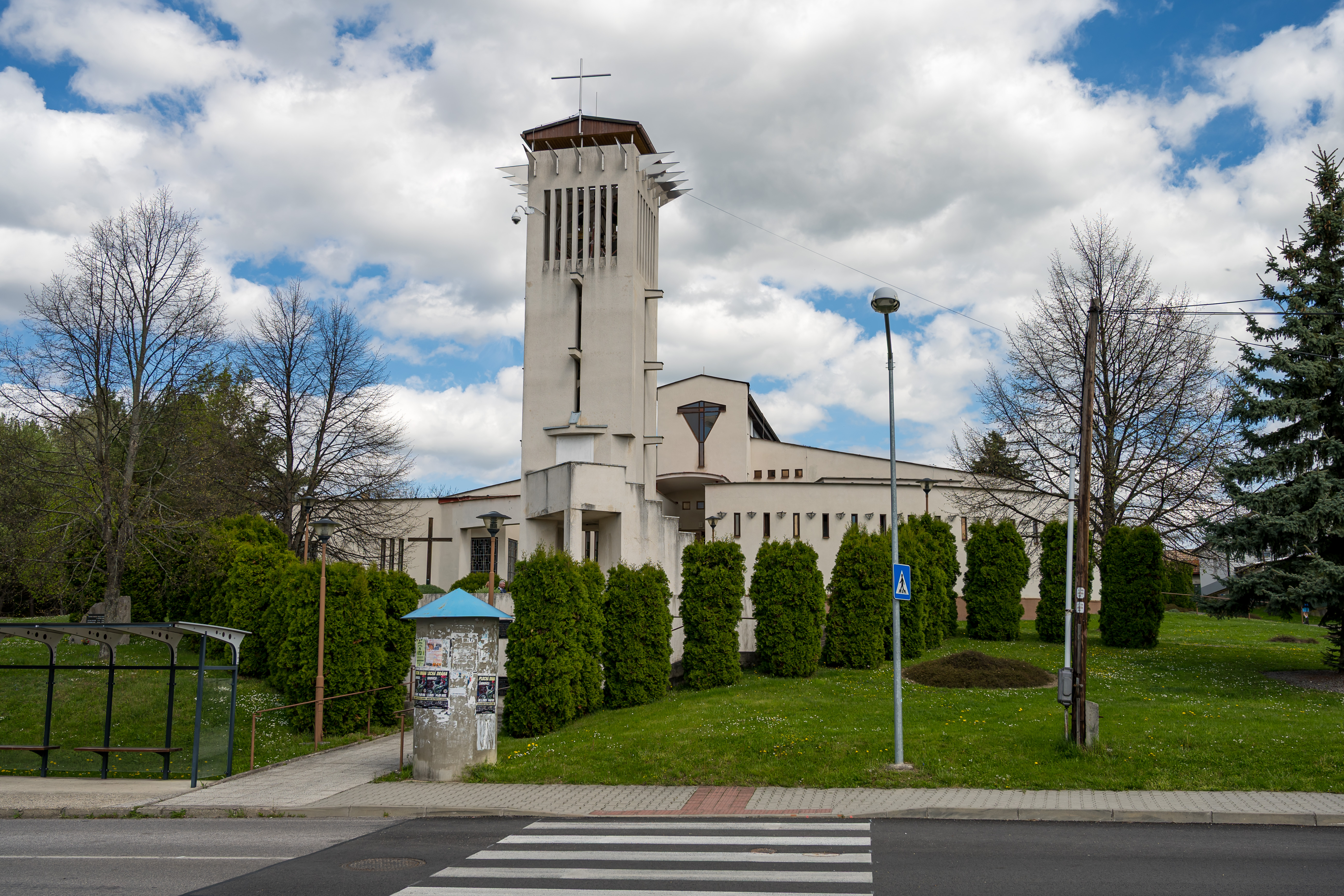

- Flag Coat of arms

- Location of Kanianka in the Trenčín Region Location of Kanianka in Slovakia
- Coordinates: 48.82°N 18.58°E
- Country: Slovakia
- Region: Trenčín Region
- District: Prievidza District
- First mentioned: 1479

Area
  - Total: 7.93 km^{2} (3.06 sq mi)
- Elevation: 372 m (1,220 ft)

Population (2025)
  - Total: 3,748
- Time zone: UTC+1 (CET)
  - Summer (DST): UTC+2 (CEST)
- Postal code: 972 17
- Area code: +421 46
- Vehicle registration plate (until 2022): PD
- Website: kanianka.sk

Kanianka (Hungarian: Kányahegy) is a village and municipality in Prievidza District in the Trenčín Region of western Slovakia.

== History ==
In historical records the village was first mentioned in 1479.

== Geography ==
The municipality lies at an altitude of 372 metres (1,220 ft) and covers an area of 7.93 km^{2} (3.06 sq mi) (2025).

== Population ==
Population statistic (10 years)
Year	1995	2005	2015	2025
Count	3679	3996	4124	3748
Difference		+8.61%	+3.20%	−9.11%

Population statistic
Year	2024	2025
Count	3802	3748
Difference		−1.42%

It has a population of 3748 people (31 December 2025).

=== Ethnicity ===
Census 2021 (1+ %)
Ethnicity	Number	Fraction
Slovak	3853	96.95%
Not found out	108	2.71%
Total	3974	

In year 2021 was 3974 people by ethnicity 3853 as Slovak, 108 as Not found out, 23 as Czech, 9 as Other, 7 as Hungarian, 4 as Russian, 2 as Ukrainian, 2 as Polish, 2 as German, 2 as English, 1 as Jewish, 1 as Vietnamese, 1 as Turkish, 1 as Rusyn and 1 as Moravian.

Note on population: The difference values of population numbers in the table "Population statistic" and in the sections "Ethnicity" & "Religion" is caused by the use of various statistical methods.

=== Religion ===
Census 2021 (1+ %)
Religion	Number	Fraction
Roman Catholic Church	2466	62.05%
None	1204	30.3%
Not found out	176	4.43%
Total	3974	

In year 2021 was 3974 people by religion 2466 from Roman Catholic Church, 1204 from None, 176 from Not found out, 26 from Evangelical Church, 19 from Ad hoc movements, 18 from Greek Catholic Church, 17 from Other and not ascertained christian church, 16 from Christian Congregations in Slovakia, 8 from Other, 5 from Buddhism, 4 from Calvinist Church, 4 from Paganism and natural spirituality, 4 from Jehovah's Witnesses, 3 from Seventh-day Adventist Church, 1 from Old Catholic Church, 1 from Islam, 1 from Church of Jesus Christ of Latter-day Saints and 1 from Bahá'i Community.

== Genealogical resources ==
The records for genealogical research are available at the state archive "Statny Archiv in Nitra, Slovakia"

- Roman Catholic church records (births/marriages/deaths): 1668-1909 (parish B)

== See also ==
- List of municipalities and towns in Slovakia
