= Králova Lhota (Rychnov nad Kněžnou District) =

- Municipality
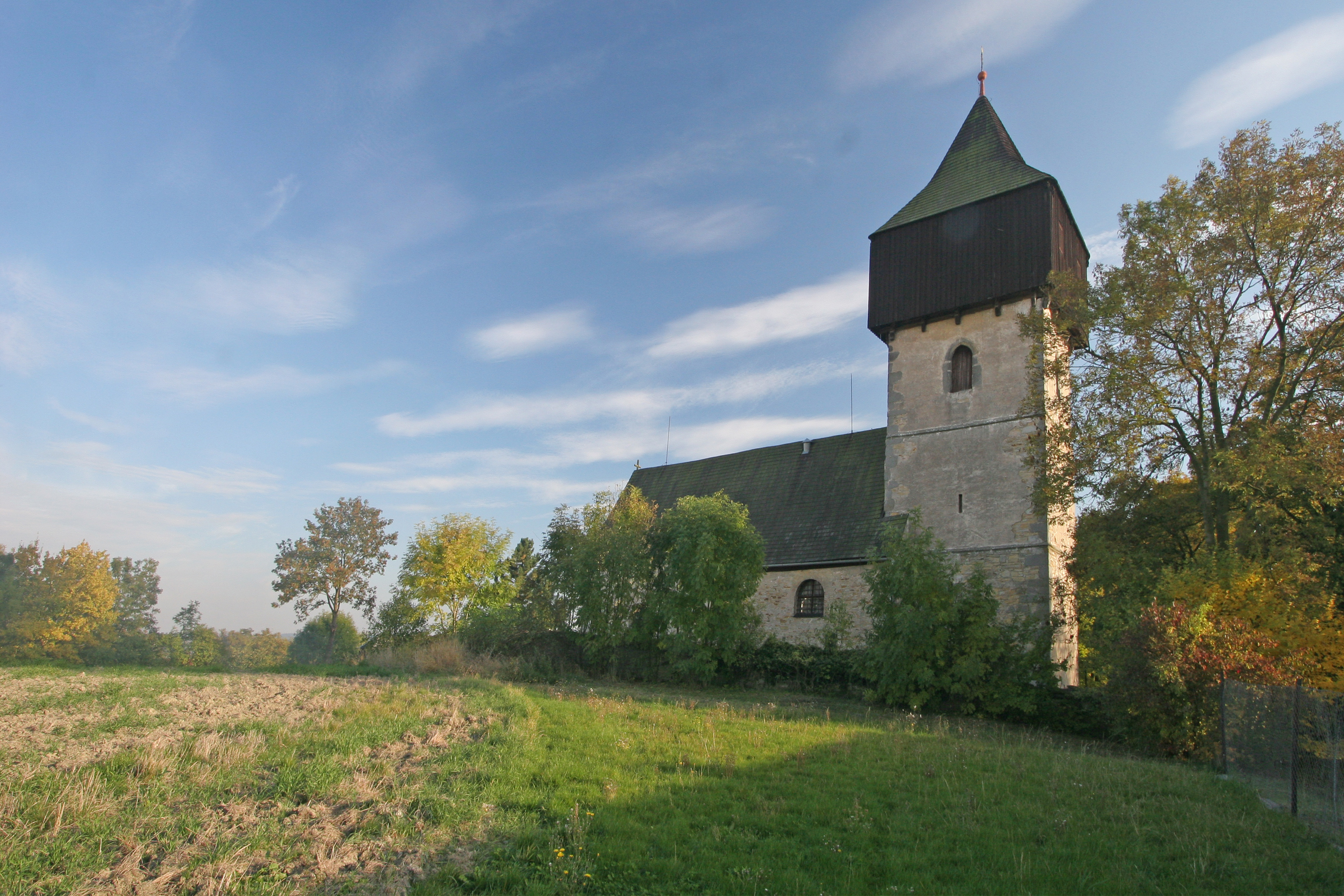
- Church of Saint Sigismund

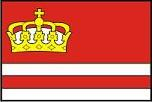
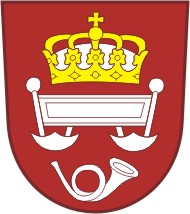
- Flag Coat of arms

- Location in the Czech Republic
- Coordinates: 50°17′40″N 15°59′57″E
- Country: Czech Republic
- Region: Hradec Králové
- District: Rychnov nad Kněžnou
- First mentioned: 1356

Area
  - Total: 5.25 km^{2} (2.03 sq mi)
- Elevation: 265 m (869 ft)

Population (2026-01-01)
  - Total: 279
  - Density: 53.1/km^{2} (138/sq mi)
- Time zone: UTC+1 (CET)
  - Summer (DST): UTC+2 (CEST)
- Postal code: 517 71
- Website: www.kralovalhota.cz

Králova Lhota is a municipality and village in Rychnov nad Kněžnou District in the Hradec Králové Region of the Czech Republic. It has about 300 inhabitants.

== Demographics ==
Historical population
Year	Pop.	±%
1869	514	—
1880	573	+11.5%
1890	614	+7.2%
1900	602	−2.0%
1910	578	−4.0%
1921	571	−1.2%
1930	488	−14.5%
1950	351	−28.1%
1961	319	−9.1%
1970	275	−13.8%
1980	222	−19.3%
1991	196	−11.7%
2001	198	+1.0%
2011	231	+16.7%
2021	260	+12.6%
Source: Censuses

== Twin towns – sister cities ==
Králova Lhota is twinned with:

- Kráľova Lehota, Slovakia
