= Kamenec pod Vtáčnikom =

- Municipality
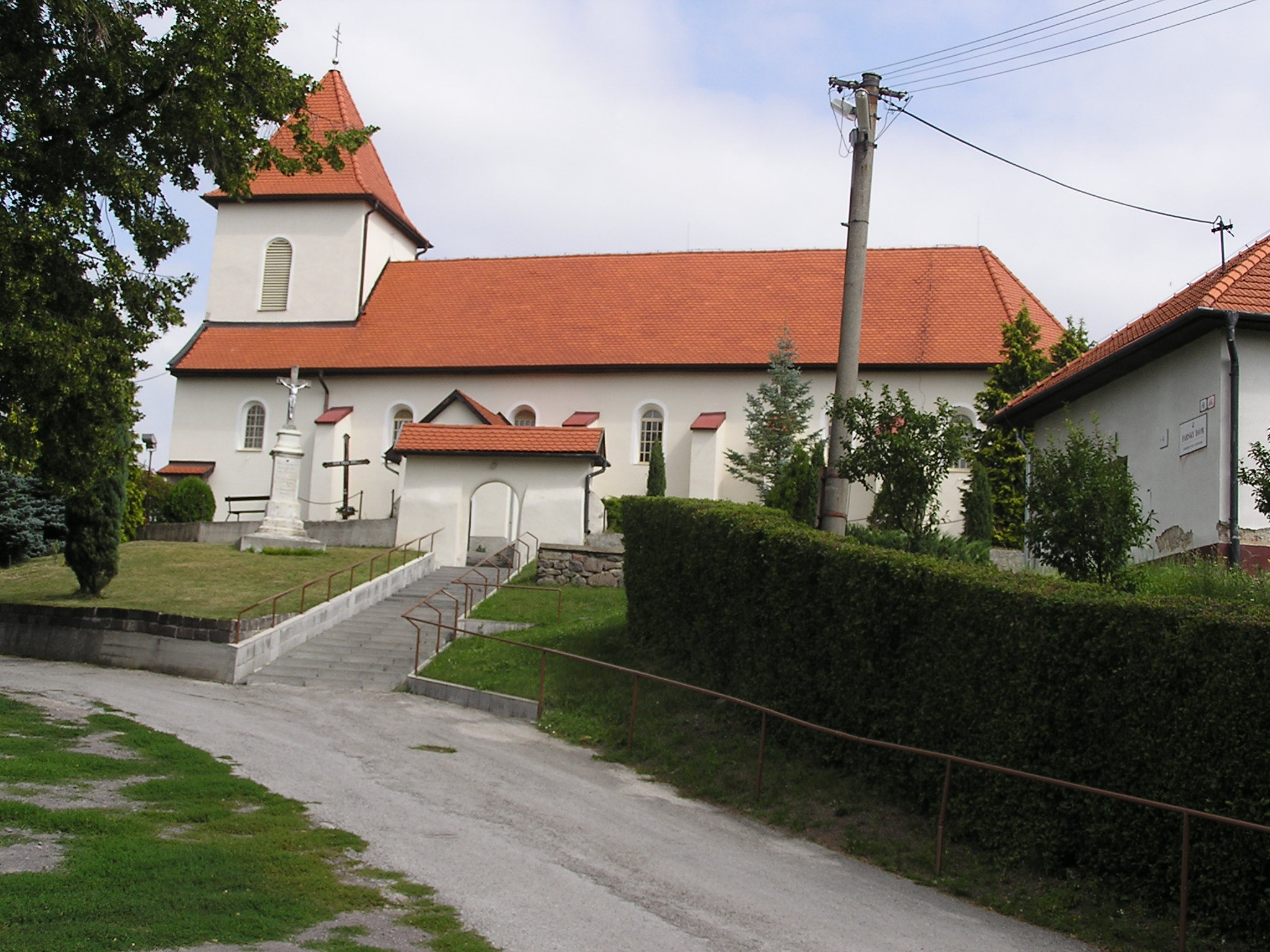
- All Saints' Church

- Flag Coat of arms

- Location of Kamenec pod Vtáčnikom in the Trenčín Region Location of Kamenec pod Vtáčnikom in Slovakia
- Coordinates: 48.67°N 18.55°E
- Country: Slovakia
- Region: Trenčín Region
- District: Prievidza District
- First mentioned: 1355

Area
  - Total: 25.29 km^{2} (9.76 sq mi)
- Elevation: 276 m (906 ft)

Population (2025)
  - Total: 1,751
- Time zone: UTC+1 (CET)
  - Summer (DST): UTC+2 (CEST)
- Postal code: 972 44
- Area code: +421 46
- Vehicle registration plate (until 2022): PD
- Website: kamenec.sk

Kamenec pod Vtáčnikom (Hungarian: Kemenec) is a village and municipality in Prievidza District in the Trenčín Region of western Slovakia. It includes the former separate villages Horny Kamenec and Dolny Kamenec.

== History ==
In historical records the village was first mentioned in 1355.

== Geography ==
The municipality lies at an altitude of 276 metres (906 ft) and covers an area of 25.29 km^{2} (9.76 sq mi) (2025).

== Population ==
Population statistic (10 years)
Year	1995	2005	2015	2025
Count	1849	1857	1788	1751
Difference		+0.43%	−3.71%	−2.06%

Population statistic
Year	2024	2025
Count	1760	1751
Difference		−0.51%

It has a population of 1751 people (31 December 2025).

=== Ethnicity ===
Census 2021 (1+ %)
Ethnicity	Number	Fraction
Slovak	1721	98.68%
Not found out	20	1.14%
Total	1744	

In year 2021 was 1744 people by ethnicity 1721 as Slovak, 20 as Not found out, 9 as Czech, 6 as Romani, 4 as German, 2 as Other, 1 as Jewish, 1 as Rusyn, 1 as Russian, 1 as Moravian, 1 as Hungarian, 1 as English and 1 as Albanian.

Note on population: The difference values of population numbers in the table "Population statistic" and in the sections "Ethnicity" & "Religion" is caused by the use of various statistical methods.

=== Religion ===
Census 2021 (1+ %)
Religion	Number	Fraction
Roman Catholic Church	1332	76.38%
None	328	18.81%
Not found out	36	2.06%
Total	1744	

In year 2021 was 1744 people by religion 1332 from Roman Catholic Church, 328 from None, 36 from Not found out, 16 from Evangelical Church, 12 from Ad hoc movements, 8 from Greek Catholic Church, 3 from Christian Congregations in Slovakia, 3 from Other, 2 from Islam, 1 from Jewish community, 1 from Eastern Orthodox Church, 1 from Jehovah's Witnesses and 1 from Buddhism.

== Genealogical resources ==
The records for genealogical research are available at the state archive "Statny Archiv in Nitra, Slovakia"

- Roman Catholic church records (births/marriages/deaths): 1777-1905 (parish A)
- Lutheran church records (births/marriages/deaths): 1735-1950 (parish B)

== See also ==
- List of municipalities and towns in Slovakia
