= Otročiněves =

- Municipality
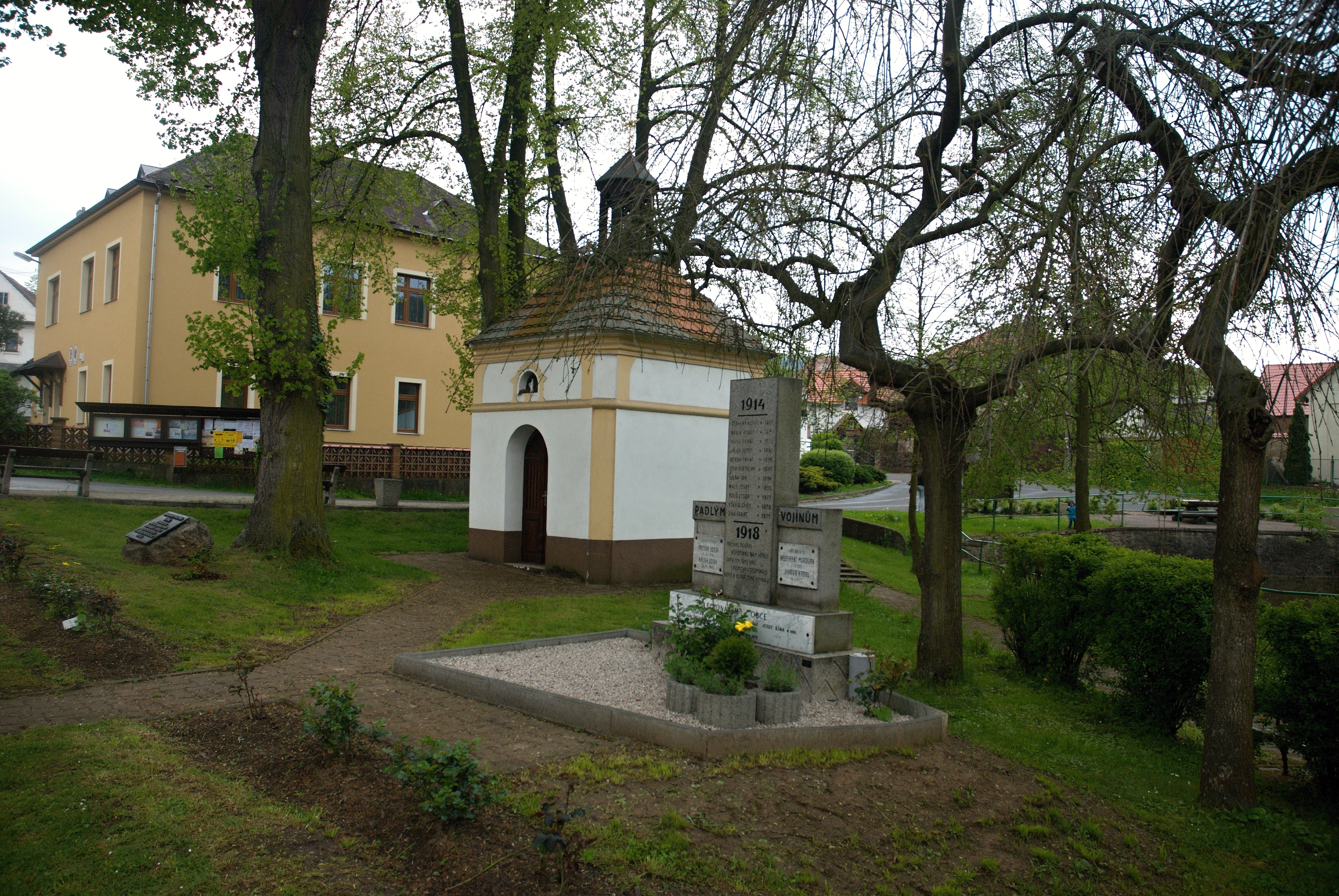
- Common with a chapel

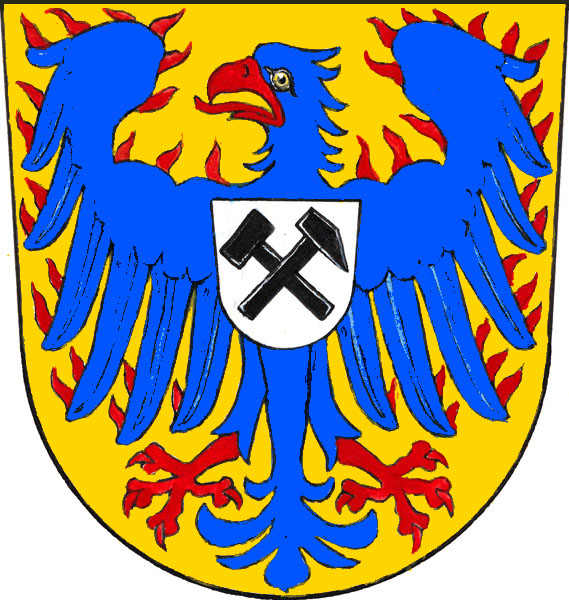
- Flag Coat of arms

- Location in the Czech Republic
- Coordinates: 49°58′50″N 13°58′44″E
- Country: Czech Republic
- Region: Central Bohemian
- District: Beroun
- First mentioned: 1005

Area
  - Total: 4.27 km^{2} (1.65 sq mi)
- Elevation: 312 m (1,024 ft)

Population (2026-01-01)
  - Total: 502
  - Density: 118/km^{2} (304/sq mi)
- Time zone: UTC+1 (CET)
  - Summer (DST): UTC+2 (CEST)
- Postal code: 267 03
- Website: www.otrocineves.cz

Otročiněves is a municipality and village in Beroun District in the Central Bohemian Region of the Czech Republic. It has about 500 inhabitants.

== Demographics ==
Historical population
Year	Pop.	±%
1869	649	—
1880	566	−12.8%
1890	391	−30.9%
1900	389	−0.5%
1910	394	+1.3%
1921	574	+45.7%
1930	658	+14.6%
1950	560	−14.9%
1961	591	+5.5%
1970	509	−13.9%
1980	491	−3.5%
1991	444	−9.6%
2001	434	−2.3%
2011	484	+11.5%
2021	492	+1.7%
Source: Censuses

== Twin towns – sister cities ==
Otročiněves is twinned with:

- (Republic of Ireland) Laragh, Ireland
