= Nedašovce =

- Municipality
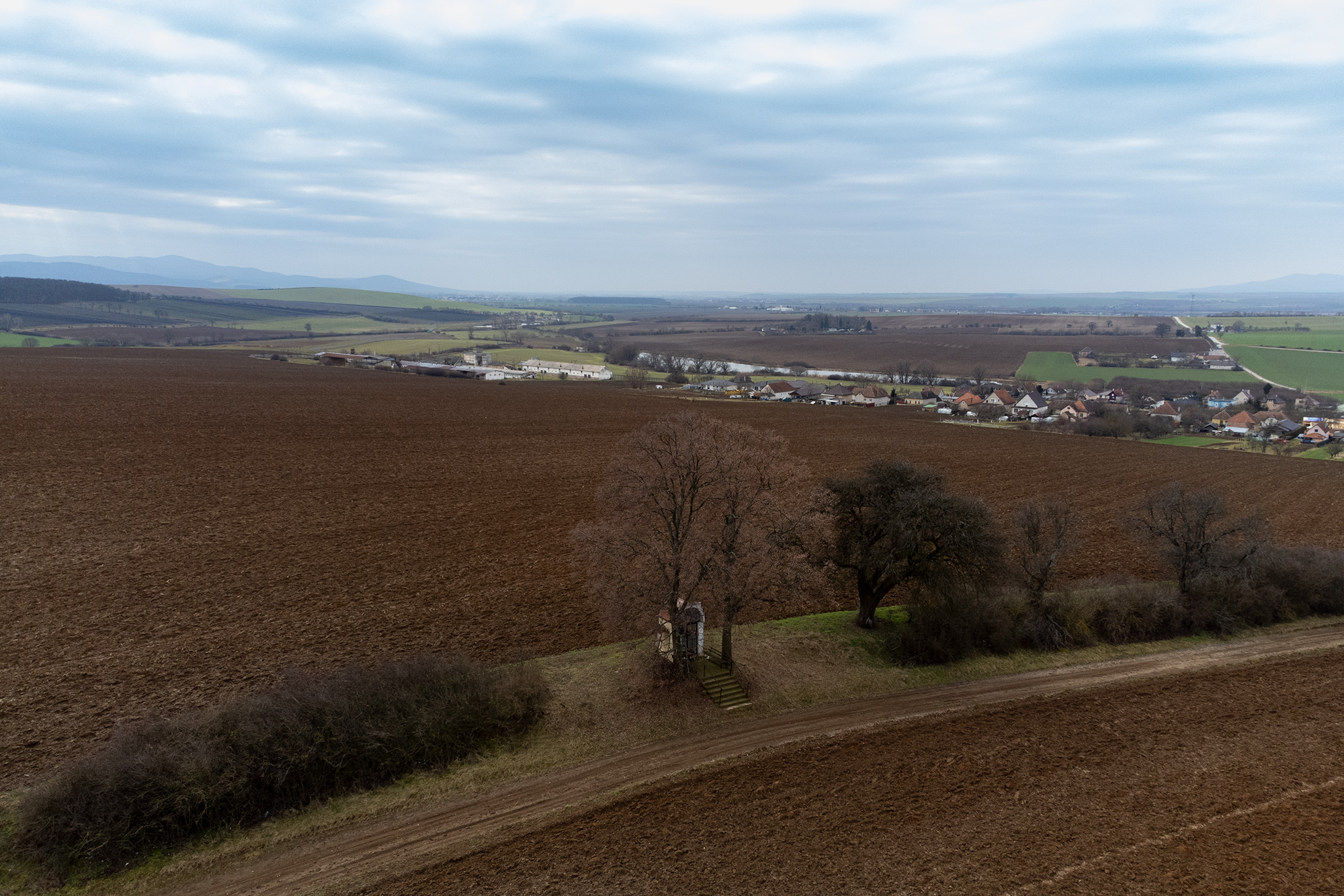

- Flag

- Location of Nedašovce in the Trenčín Region Location of Nedašovce in Slovakia
- Coordinates: 48.67°N 18.32°E
- Country: Slovakia
- Region: Trenčín Region
- District: Bánovce nad Bebravou District
- First mentioned: 1232

Area
  - Total: 6.91 km^{2} (2.67 sq mi)
- Elevation: 202 m (663 ft)

Population (2025)
  - Total: 419
- Time zone: UTC+1 (CET)
  - Summer (DST): UTC+2 (CEST)
- Postal code: 956 35
- Area code: +421 38
- Vehicle registration plate (until 2022): BN
- Website: www.nedasovce.sk

Nedašovce (Hungarian: Nitranádas) is a village and municipality in Bánovce nad Bebravou District in the Trenčín Region of north-western Slovakia.

== History ==
In historical records, the village was first mentioned in 1232.

== Geography ==
The municipality lies at an altitude of 202 metres (663 ft) and covers an area of 6.91 km^{2} (2.67 sq mi) (2025).

== Population ==
Population statistic (10 years)
Year	1995	2005	2015	2025
Count	438	442	431	419
Difference		+0.91%	−2.48%	−2.78%

Population statistic
Year	2024	2025
Count	427	419
Difference		−1.87%

It has a population of 419 people (31 December 2025).

=== Ethnicity ===
Census 2021 (1+ %)
Ethnicity	Number	Fraction
Slovak	425	97.7%
Not found out	10	2.29%
Total	435	

In year 2021 was 435 people by ethnicity 425 as Slovak, 10 as Not found out, 2 as Czech, 1 as Russian, 1 as Romanian, 1 as Moravian and 1 as Hungarian.

Note on population: The difference values of population numbers in the table "Population statistic" and in the sections "Ethnicity" & "Religion" is caused by the use of various statistical methods.

=== Religion ===
Census 2021 (1+ %)
Religion	Number	Fraction
Roman Catholic Church	360	82.76%
None	51	11.72%
Not found out	10	2.3%
Evangelical Church	8	1.84%
Total	435	

In year 2021 was 435 people by religion 360 from Roman Catholic Church, 51 from None, 10 from Not found out, 8 from Evangelical Church, 2 from Calvinist Church, 2 from Christian Congregations in Slovakia and 2 from Greek Catholic Church.
