= Zlatá Baňa =

- Municipality
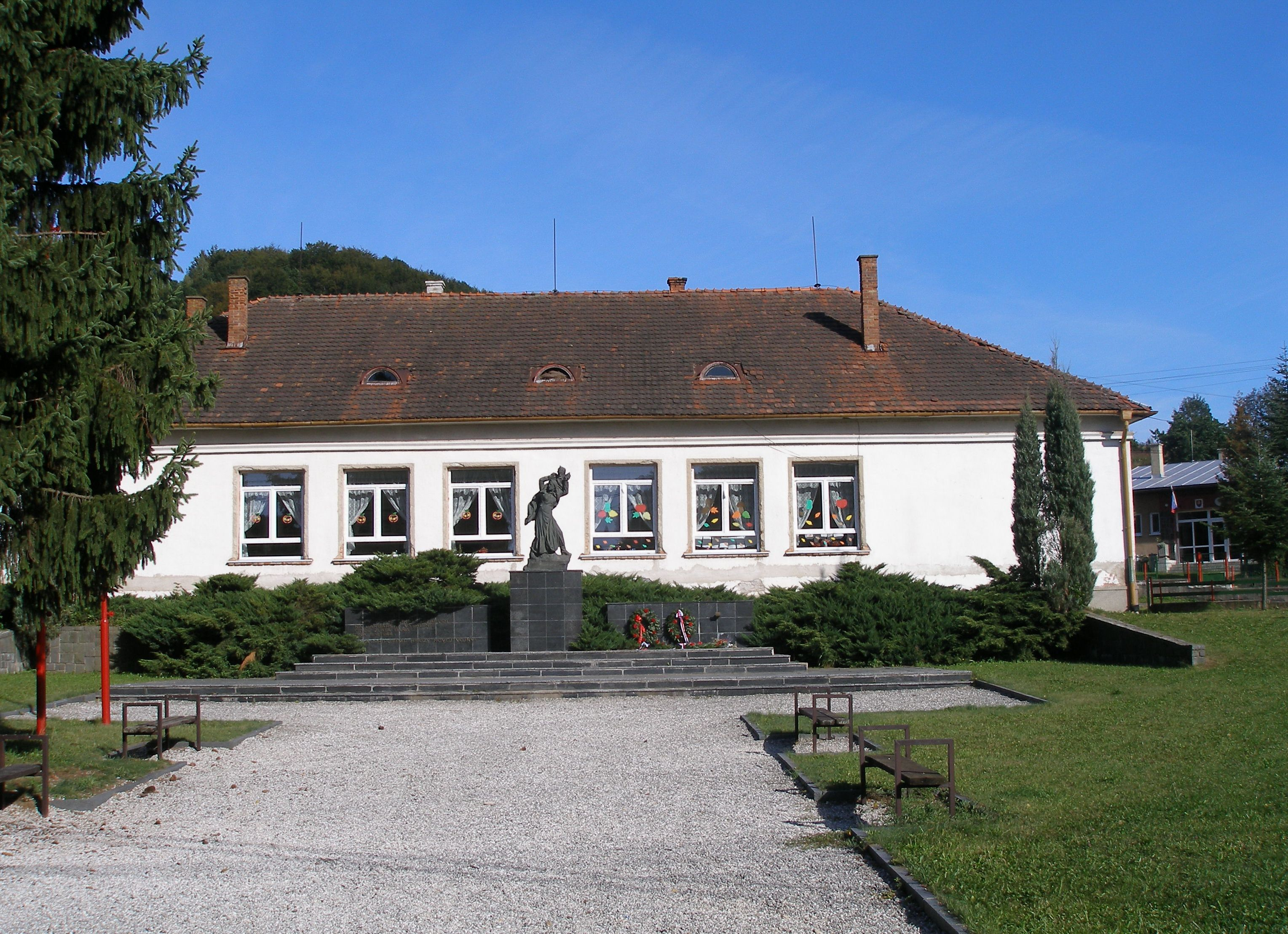

- Flag

- Location of Zlatá Baňa in the Prešov Region Location of Zlatá Baňa in Slovakia
- Coordinates: 48.95°N 21.43°E
- Country: Slovakia
- Region: Prešov Region
- District: Prešov District
- First mentioned: 1567

Area
  - Total: 31.73 km^{2} (12.25 sq mi)
- Elevation: 544 m (1,785 ft)

Population (2025)
  - Total: 439
- Time zone: UTC+1 (CET)
  - Summer (DST): UTC+2 (CEST)
- Postal code: 825 2
- Area code: +421 51
- Vehicle registration plate (until 2022): PO
- Website: zlatabana.sk

Zlatá Baňa (Hungarian: Aranybánya) is a village and municipality in Prešov District in the Prešov Region of eastern Slovakia.

== Name ==
The name of the village means literally the "Gold Mine".

== History ==
In historical records the village was first mentioned in 1550.

== Geography ==
The municipality lies at an altitude of 544 metres (1,785 ft) and covers an area of 31.73 km^{2} (12.25 sq mi) (2025).

== Population ==
Population statistic (10 years)
Year	1995	2005	2015	2025
Count	407	419	452	439
Difference		+2.94%	+7.87%	−2.87%

Population statistic
Year	2024	2025
Count	431	439
Difference		+1.85%

It has a population of 439 people (31 December 2025).

=== Ethnicity ===
Census 2021 (1+ %)
Ethnicity	Number	Fraction
Slovak	445	97.58%
Not found out	8	1.75%
Rusyn	7	1.53%
Total	456	

In year 2021 was 456 people by ethnicity 445 as Slovak, 8 as Not found out, 7 as Rusyn, 3 as Romani, 3 as German, 2 as Other, 1 as Czech and 1 as Hungarian.

Note on population: The difference values of population numbers in the table "Population statistic" and in the sections "Ethnicity" & "Religion" is caused by the use of various statistical methods.

=== Religion ===
Census 2021 (1+ %)
Religion	Number	Fraction
Roman Catholic Church	380	83.33%
None	32	7.02%
Greek Catholic Church	27	5.92%
Not found out	8	1.75%
Evangelical Church	5	1.1%
Total	456	

In year 2021 was 456 people by religion 380 from Roman Catholic Church, 32 from None, 27 from Greek Catholic Church, 8 from Not found out, 5 from Evangelical Church, 3 from Eastern Orthodox Church and 1 from Ad hoc movements.
