= Střelice (Brno-Country District) =

- Municipality
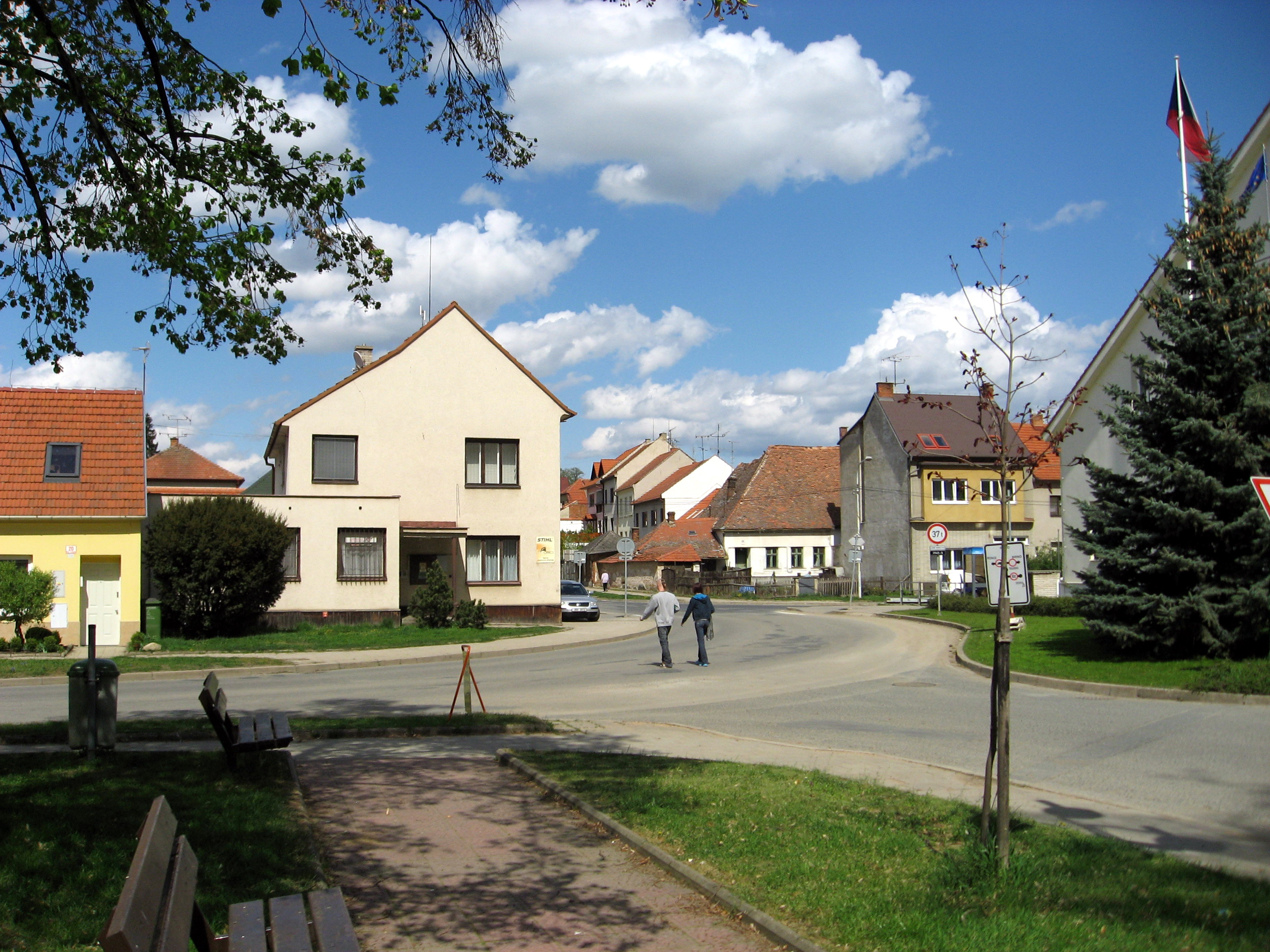
- Centre of Střelice

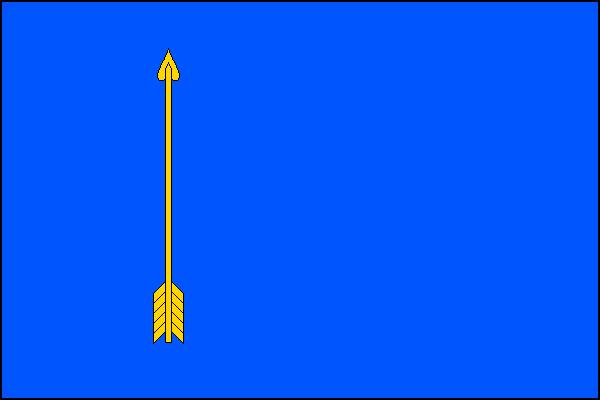
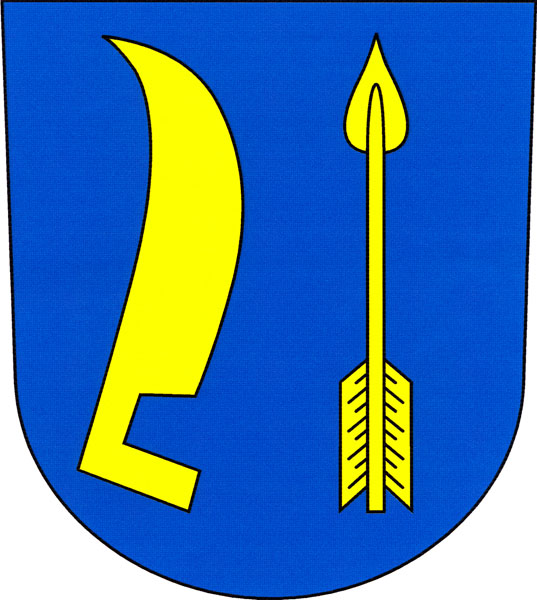
- Flag Coat of arms

- Location in the Czech Republic
- Coordinates: 49°9′8″N 16°30′14″E
- Country: Czech Republic
- Region: South Moravian
- District: Brno-Country
- First mentioned: 1375

Area
  - Total: 14.67 km^{2} (5.66 sq mi)
- Elevation: 278 m (912 ft)

Population (2026-01-01)
  - Total: 3,249
  - Density: 221.5/km^{2} (573.6/sq mi)
- Time zone: UTC+1 (CET)
  - Summer (DST): UTC+2 (CEST)
- Postal code: 664 47
- Website: www.streliceubrna.cz

Střelice (Czech pronunciation: [ˈstr̝̊ɛlɪtsɛ]) is a municipality and village in Brno-Country District in the South Moravian Region of the Czech Republic. It has about 3,200 inhabitants.

== Etymology ==
The name of the village is derived from the Czech words střelec ('shooter') and střílet ('to shoot'). According to legend, the village was originally the seat of the land's archers.

== Geography ==
Střelice is located about 8 kilometres (5 mi) southwest of Brno. It lies in the Bobrava Highlands. The highest point is at 385 m (1,263 ft) above sea level. The municipality is situated on the left bank of the Bobrava River, which flows along the southern municipal border.

== History ==
The first written mention of Střelice is from 1375, when Moravian margrave John Henry founded the Carthusian monastery in Královo Pole and donated it several villages, including Střelice.

== Demographics ==
Historical population

Year	Pop.	±%
1869	1,052	—
1880	1,037	−1.4%
1890	1,177	+13.5%
1900	1,261	+7.1%
1910	1,517	+20.3%

Year	Pop.	±%
1921	1,840	+21.3%
1930	2,266	+23.2%
1950	2,432	+7.3%
1961	2,661	+9.4%
1970	2,542	−4.5%

Year	Pop.	±%
1980	2,697	+6.1%
1991	2,453	−9.0%
2001	2,537	+3.4%
2011	2,801	+10.4%
2021	3,046	+8.7%

Source: Censuses

== Transport ==
Střelice is located on the railway line Brno–Třebíč.

== Sights ==
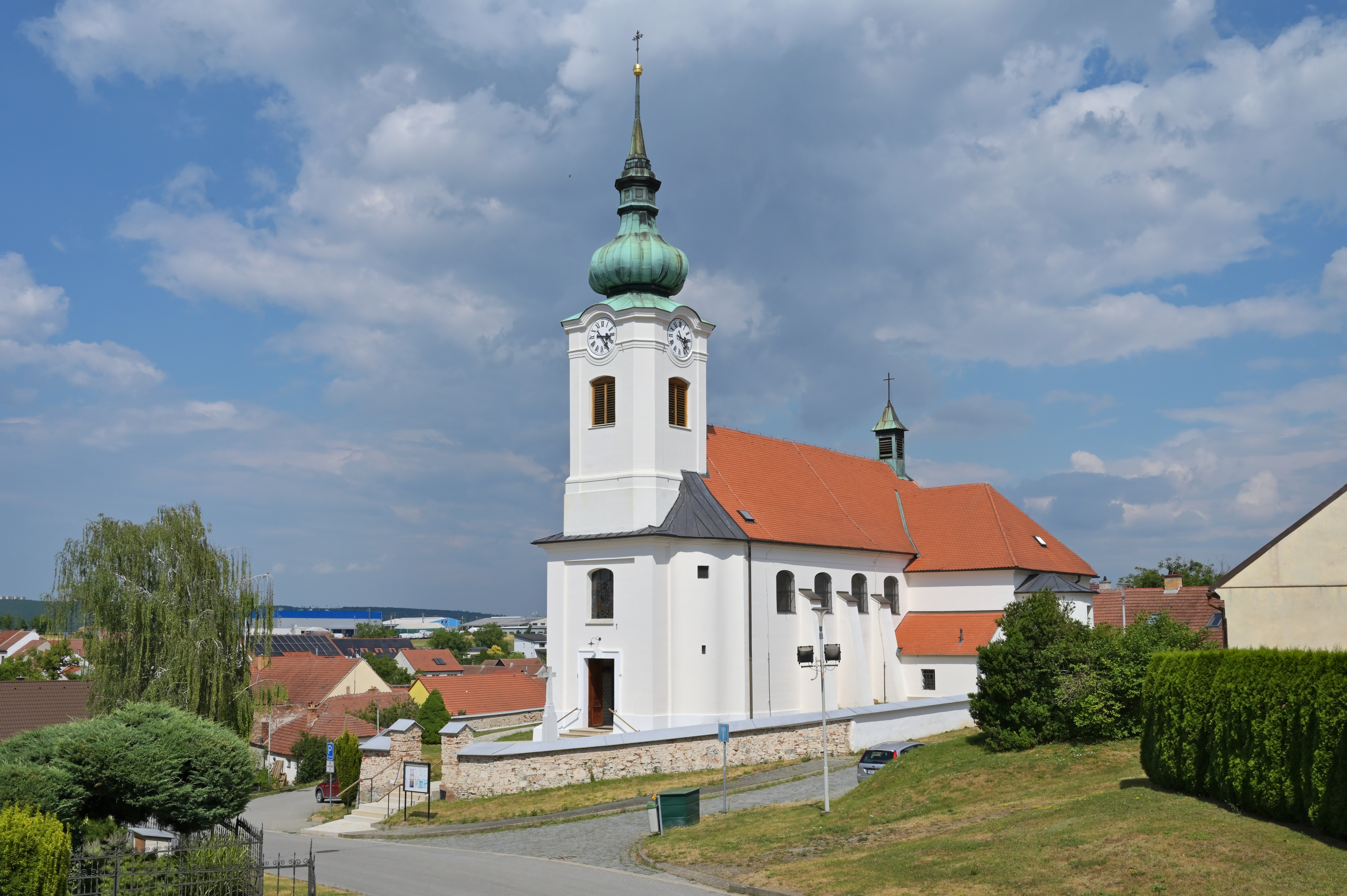
Church of the Holy Trinity

The main landmark of Střelice is the Church of the Holy Trinity. It was built in the late Baroque style, but it has a medieval core. Its present form is the result of the reconstruction in 1932.

== Twin towns – sister cities ==
Střelice is twinned with:

- Assago, Italy
- Nozay, France
