= Střelice (Plzeň-South District) =

- Municipality
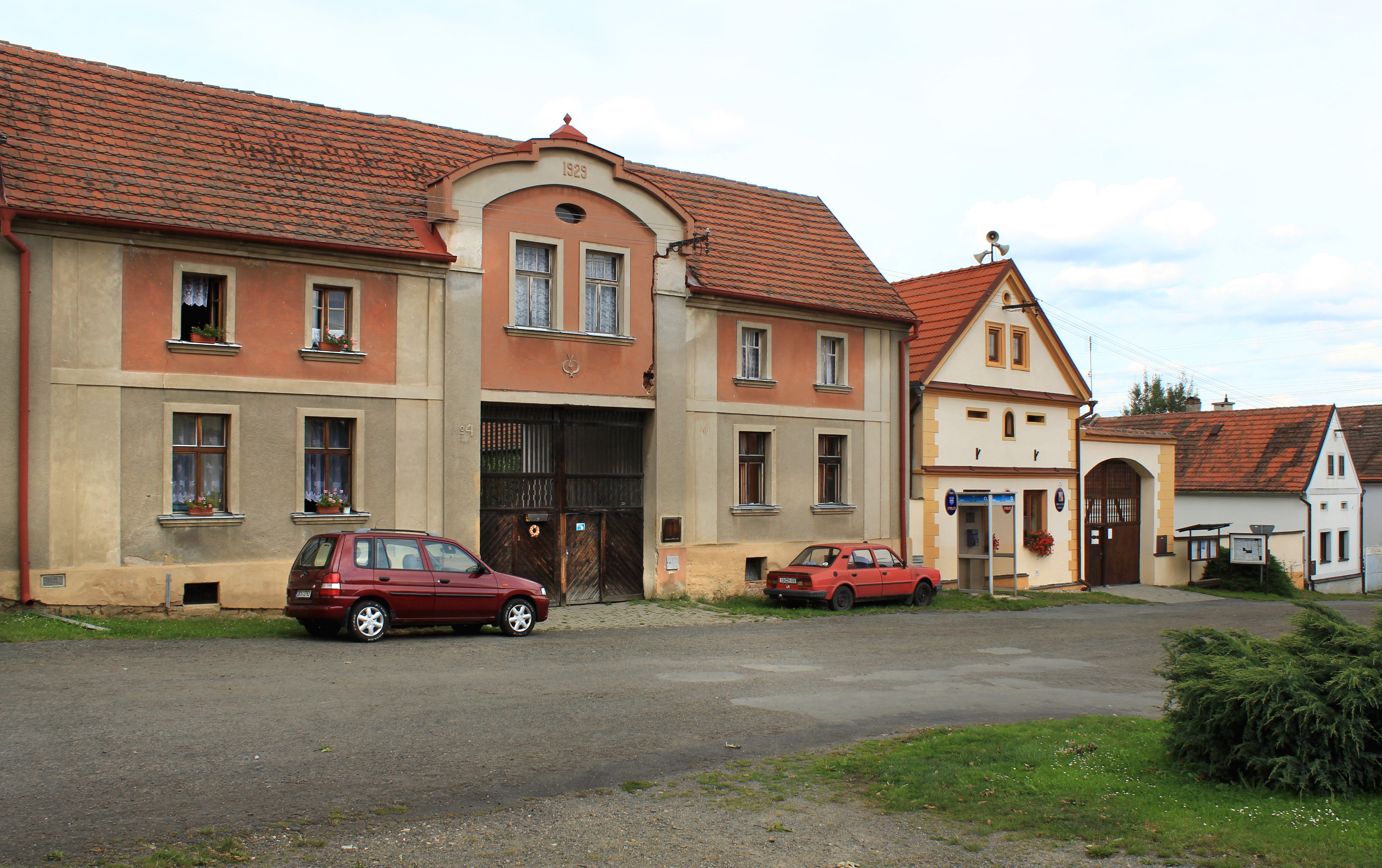
- Centre of Střelice

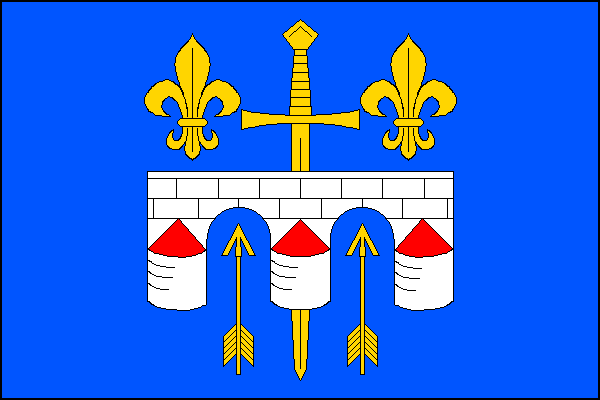
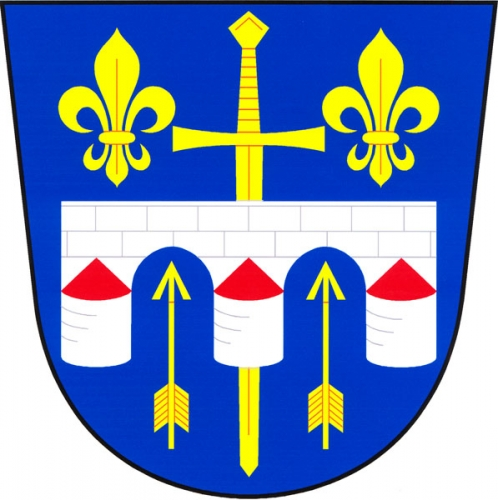
- Flag Coat of arms

- Location in the Czech Republic
- Coordinates: 49°37′50″N 13°8′5″E
- Country: Czech Republic
- Region: Plzeň
- District: Plzeň-South
- First mentioned: 1248

Area
  - Total: 5.09 km^{2} (1.97 sq mi)
- Elevation: 352 m (1,155 ft)

Population (2026-01-01)
  - Total: 151
  - Density: 29.7/km^{2} (76.8/sq mi)
- Time zone: UTC+1 (CET)
  - Summer (DST): UTC+2 (CEST)
- Postal code: 333 01
- Website: www.obec-strelice.cz

Střelice is a municipality and village in Plzeň-South District in the Plzeň Region of the Czech Republic. It has about 200 inhabitants.

Střelice lies approximately 23 kilometres (14 mi) south-west of Plzeň and 107 km (66 mi) south-west of Prague.

== Demographics ==
Historical population
Year	Pop.	±%
1869	178	—
1880	157	−11.8%
1890	165	+5.1%
1900	151	−8.5%
1910	153	+1.3%
1921	183	+19.6%
1930	193	+5.5%
1950	133	−31.1%
1961	127	−4.5%
1970	112	−11.8%
1980	108	−3.6%
1991	106	−1.9%
2001	118	+11.3%
2011	144	+22.0%
2021	147	+2.1%
Source: Censuses
