= Kráľova Lehota =

Village and municipality in Slovakia

- Municipality
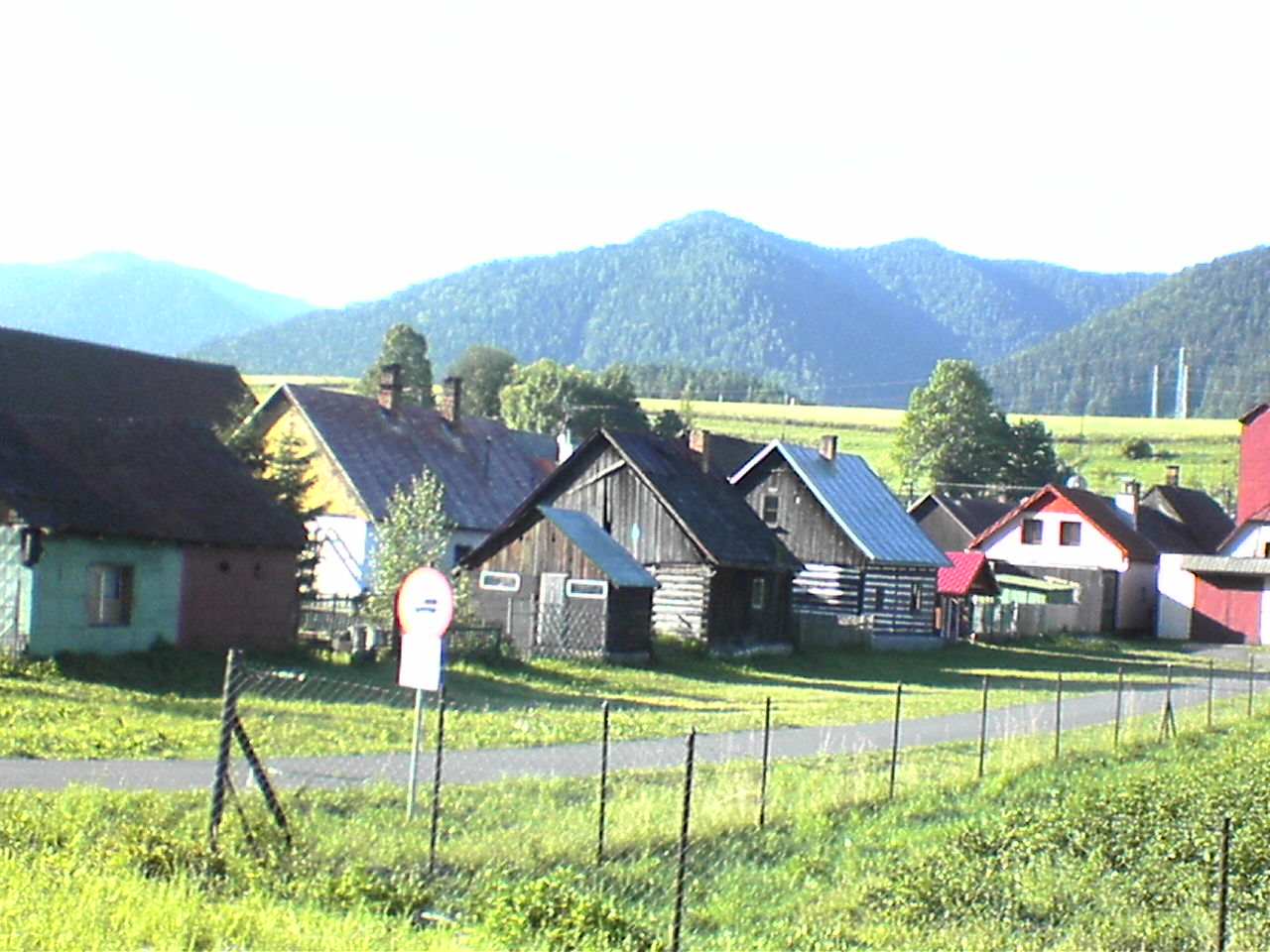

- Flag

- Location of Kráľova Lehota in the Žilina Region Location of Kráľova Lehota in Slovakia
- Coordinates: 49.02°N 19.79°E
- Country: Slovakia
- Region: Žilina Region
- District: Liptovský Mikuláš District
- First mentioned: 1361

Area
  - Total: 165.33 km^{2} (63.83 sq mi)
- Elevation: 674 m (2,211 ft)

Population (2025)
  - Total: 598
- Time zone: UTC+1 (CET)
  - Summer (DST): UTC+2 (CEST)
- Postal code: 323 3
- Area code: +421 44
- Vehicle registration plate (until 2022): LM
- Website: www.kralovalehota.sk

Kráľova Lehota (Hungarian: Királylehota) is a village and municipality in Liptovský Mikuláš District in the Žilina Region of northern Slovakia.

== History ==
In historical records the village was first mentioned in 1361. Before the establishment of independent Czechoslovakia in 1918, it was part of Liptó County within the Kingdom of Hungary. From 1939 to 1945, it was part of the Slovak Republic.

== Geography ==
The municipality lies at an altitude of 674 metres (2,211 ft) and covers an area of 165.33 km^{2} (63.83 sq mi) (2025).

== Population ==
Population statistic (10 years)
Year	1995	2005	2015	2025
Count	720	625	586	598
Difference		−13.19%	−6.24%	+2.04%

Population statistic
Year	2024	2025
Count	602	598
Difference		−0.66%

It has a population of 598 people (31 December 2025).

=== Ethnicity ===
Census 2021 (1+ %)
Ethnicity	Number	Fraction
Slovak	563	94.14%
Romani	22	3.67%
Czech	8	1.33%
Polish	6	1%
Total	598	

In year 2021 was 598 people by ethnicity 563 as Slovak, 22 as Romani, 8 as Czech, 6 as Polish, 3 as Not found out, 2 as Rusyn, 2 as Other, 1 as Serbian, 1 as French and 1 as Albanian.

Note on population: The difference values of population numbers in the table "Population statistic" and in the sections "Ethnicity" & "Religion" is caused by the use of various statistical methods.

=== Religion ===
Census 2021 (1+ %)
Religion	Number	Fraction
Evangelical Church	255	42.64%
Roman Catholic Church	184	30.77%
None	124	20.74%
Church of the Brethren	11	1.84%
Greek Catholic Church	9	1.51%
Not found out	6	1%
Total	598	

In year 2021 was 598 people by religion 255 from Evangelical Church, 184 from Roman Catholic Church, 124 from None, 11 from Church of the Brethren, 9 from Greek Catholic Church, 6 from Not found out, 2 from Eastern Orthodox Church, 2 from Other, 2 from Ad hoc movements, 1 from Jehovah's Witnesses, 1 from Buddhism and 1 from Apostolic Church.

== Genealogical resources ==
The records for genealogical research are available at the state archive "Statny Archiv in Bytca, Slovakia"

- Roman Catholic church records (births/marriages/deaths): 1675-1923 (parish B)
- Lutheran church records (births/marriages/deaths): 1784-1897 (parish A)

== See also ==
- List of municipalities and towns in Slovakia
