= Ellguth =

Ellguth or Ellgoth is a German variant name for several Central European villages that derive their names from the medieval Slavic lhóta meaning "free or grace period", referring to the medieval custom of village founders being exempt from paying duties to their lords for a period of 5–8 years.

== See also ==
- Lehota
- Ligota (disambiguation)
- Lgota
- Lhota
- Ligotka, Opole_Voivodeship, Poland
- Wola (settlement)
