= Ligota =

Location of villages named Ligota listed in this page

Ligota is a common name for villages in Western Poland. The word, related to Czech: lhóta (free or grace period), refers to the medieval custom of village founders being exempt from paying duties to their lords for a period of 5–8 years.

Villages throughout Poland and other parts of Central Europe have variants of this name.

See: for a list of locations that include "Ligota" as part of their name.

The Official Polish Register of Territorial Divisions (TERYT, Krajowy Rejestr Urzędowy Podziału Terytorialnego Kraju) lists 8 primary places with the name Ligota:

- Ligota, Silesian Voivodeship (south Poland)
- Ligota, Góra County in Lower Silesian Voivodeship (south-west Poland)
- Ligota, Trzebnica County in Lower Silesian Voivodeship (south-west Poland)
- Ligota, Łask County in Łódź Voivodeship (central Poland)
- Ligota, Sieradz County in Łódź Voivodeship (central Poland)
- Ligota, Gmina Raszków, Ostrów County in Greater Poland Voivodeship (west-central Poland)
- Ligota, Ostrzeszów County in Greater Poland Voivodeship (west-central Poland)
- Ligota, Opole Voivodeship (south-west Poland)

and 3 parts of places with the name Ligota:

- Ligota (colony in Sieradz County) in Łódź Voivodeship (central Poland)
- Ligota (Biskupice), part of the village of Biskupice, Miechów County in Lesser Poland Voivodeship (south Poland)
- Ligota (Kępiński county) a hamlet in Greater Poland Voivodeship (west-central Poland)

In addition, there are a number of places not included in the TERYT:

- Ligota (Katowice) part of Katowice in Silesian Voivodeship (south Poland)
- Ligota - Ligocka Kuźnia part of Rybnik in Silesian Voivodeship (south Poland)
- Ligota (Wrocław) a housing estate in Wrocław in Lower Silesian Voivodeship (south-west Poland)

== See also ==
- Ellguth (disambiguation)
- Lehota
- Lgota
- Lhota
- Wola (settlement)
- Sloboda (settlement), a similar concept in Russian history
