= Wola (settlement) =

Type of Polish agricultural settlement

Wola ([ˈvɔ.la], plural wole, Latin: libera villa, libertas Ukrainian: Воля, Volia) was a name given to agricultural villages in the Polish–Lithuanian Commonwealth that appeared as early as the first half of the 13th century and historically constituted a separate category of settlements in Poland, by comparison to others, in terms of the populace that settled them and of the freedoms that were granted. These settlers were given plots of land and exemption for a certain number of years (up to 20) from all rents, fees, and taxes, and in most cases separate institutions and charters based on either the Magdeburg law, or its local variants.

The names Wola and Wolka ("Little Wola"), usually qualified by an adjective, form the names of hundreds of villages in Poland.

The practice of establishing wole is known as Wolnizna in Polish and used to be known as lgota or 'ligota", which in Old Polish means "relief", referring to tax reliefs for settlers. Accordingly, quite a few Polish settlements are called Ligota, Ligotka, Lhota, Lgota etc.

Volia is related to settlements that existed in the lands of the Crown of the Kingdom of Poland. Following the partitions of Poland in 18th century, certain of those settlements kept the status as the populated places' names.

== See also ==
- Lhota, a similar concept in Czech history
- Sloboda, a similar concept in Russian history
- Wola, now a borough of Warsaw
- Wola (disambiguation)
