= Zábřeh (disambiguation) =

Zábřeh is a town in the Olomouc Region, Czech Republic.

Zábřeh may also refer to:

- Zábřeh, a village and part of Dolní Benešov, Czech Republic
- Zábřeh (Ostrava), a part of Ostrava, Czech Republic

== See also ==
- Zabrzeg
