= Czechowice-Dziedzice =

Town in Silesian Voivodeship, Poland

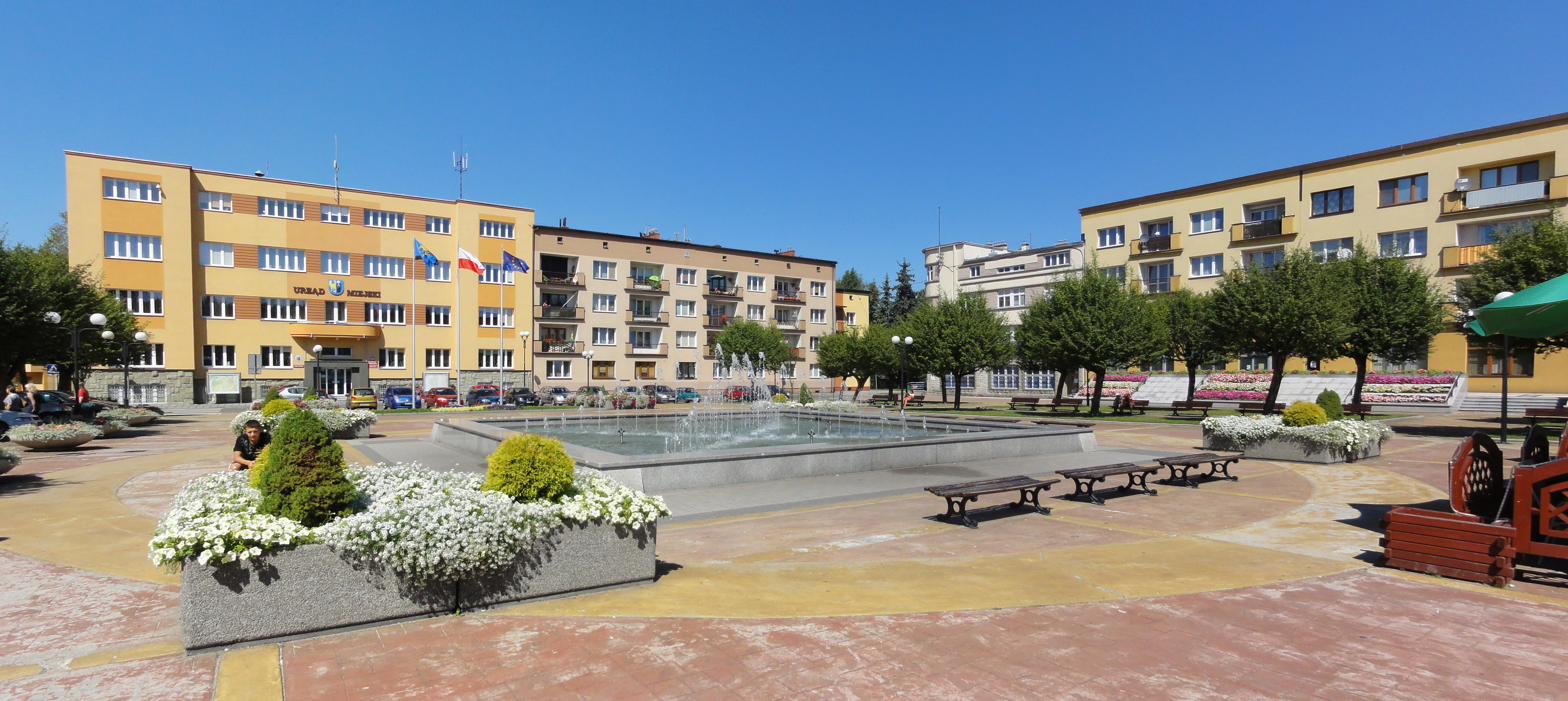
- John Paul II Square

- Flag Coat of arms Logo

- Location within Poland
- Coordinates: 49°54′47″N 19°0′23″E
- Country: Poland
- Voivodeship: Silesian
- County: Bielsko
- Gmina: Czechowice-Dziedzice

Government
  - Mayor: Marian Błachut (PB)

Area
  - Total: 32.98 km^{2} (12.73 sq mi)

Population (31 December 2021)
  - Total: 35,684
  - Density: 1,082/km^{2} (2,802/sq mi)
- Time zone: UTC+1 (CET)
  - Summer (DST): UTC+2 (CEST)
- Postal code: 43-500, 43-502, 43-503
- Area code: +48 32
- Car plates: SBI
- Website: http://www.czechowice-dziedzice.pl

Czechowice-Dziedzice [t͡ʂɛxɔˈvit͡sɛ d͡ʑɛˈd͡ʑit͡sɛ], (Note: Silesian: Czechowice-Dziydzice) known until 1958 as Czechowice, is a town in Bielsko County, Silesian Voivodeship, southern Poland. The town has 35,684 inhabitants, as of December 2021. It lies on the northeastern edge of the historical region of Cieszyn Silesia. It is a large rail junction with four stations, located at the intersection of two major lines – east-west (Trzebinia – Zebrzydowice), and north–south (Katowice – Bielsko-Biala).

== History ==
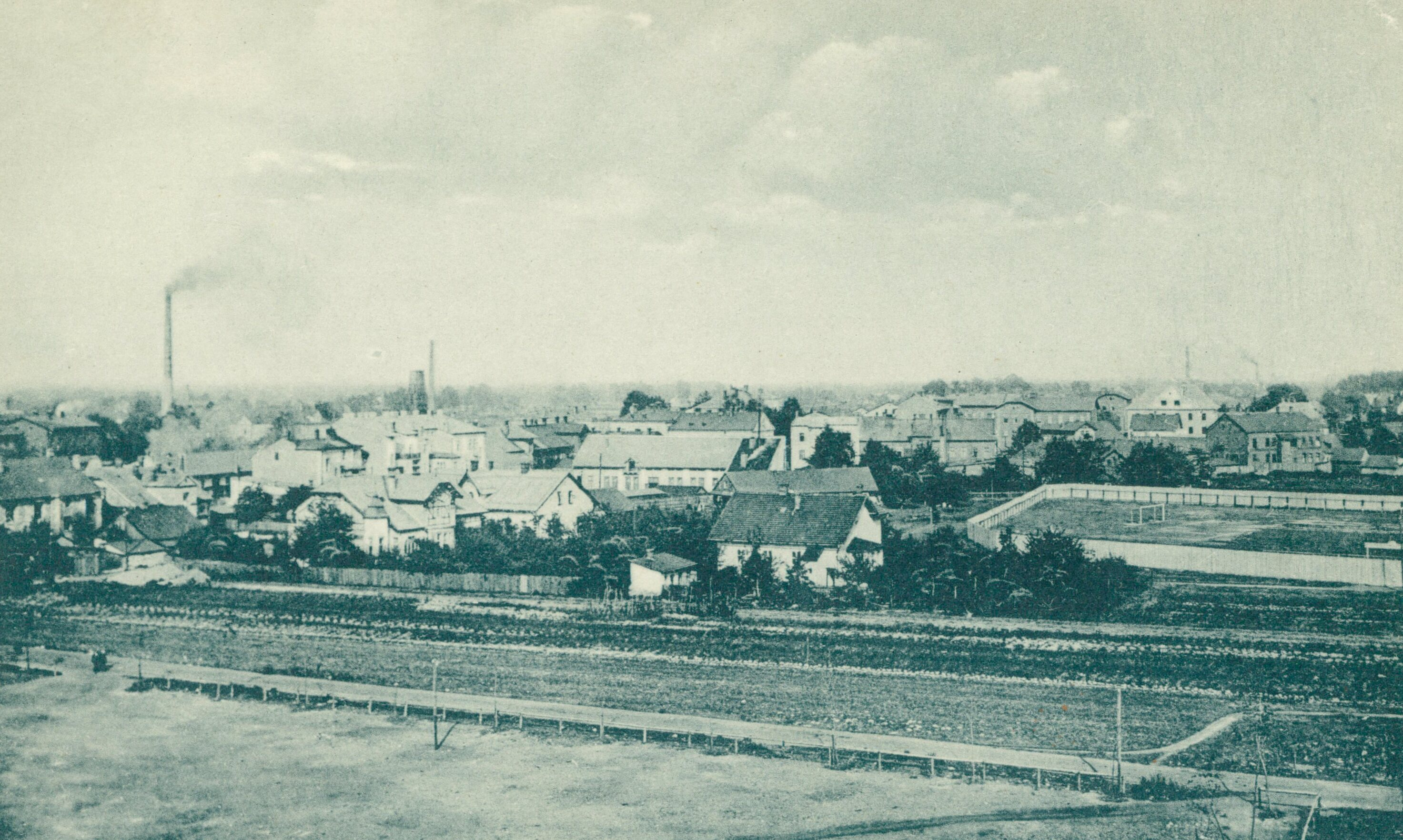
General view of Dziedzice in the 1920s.

The area inhabited by the Golensizi tribe probably became part of Poland under Mieszko I of Poland, but the first certain historical mentions pertaining to the region appeared much later. The village of Czechowice was first mentioned in a Latin document of the Diocese of Wrocław called Liber fundationis episcopatus Vratislaviensis from around 1305 as two settlements:

Item in Chothowitz theutonico fertones
Item in Chothowitz polonico decima more polonico, valet I marcam

Chotowitz theutonico (German Czechowice) was presumably established under German rights (iure theuthonico) on the ground of the older Chotowitz polonico, which was continuously ruling itself under Polish traditional rights (iure polonico). The declared size of a tithe paid by villagers was also suggesting that it was an old and quite developed community. It belonged then to the Duchy of Cieszyn, formed in 1290 within fragmented Piast-ruled Poland. In 1327 the duchy passed under the suzerainty of the Kingdom of Bohemia as a fee, although it remained ruled by the Polish Piast dynasty until 1653, when it passed to the House of Habsburg. In 1430 the village was first mentioned under the current name of Czechowice rather than Chatowice. Dziedzice were first mentioned in 1465. The other medieval village that was later absorbed by Czechowice was Żebracz, first mentioned in 1443.

The village of Czechowice became a seat of a Catholic parish, mentioned in the register of Peter's Pence payment from 1447 among 50 parishes of Teschen deanery as Czechowicz. In the time of Protestant Reformation, the parish of Czechowice stayed Roman Catholic, conversely to the nearby town of Bielsko and the rest of the Duchy of Cieszyn.

=== 19th and early 20th centuries ===
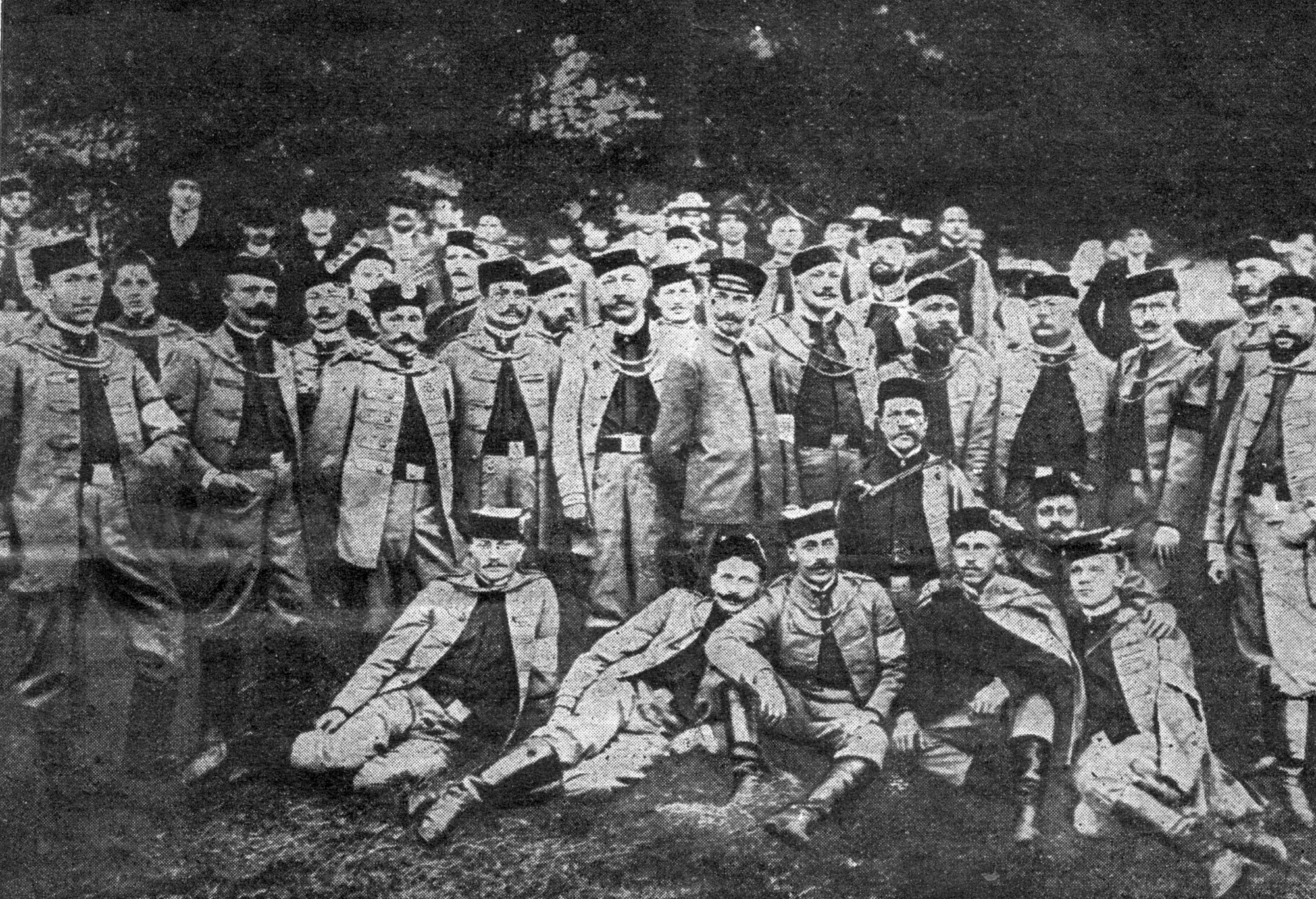
Members of the "Sokół" Polish Gymnastic Society in Dziedzice after its founding in 1905

After Revolutions of 1848 in the Austrian Empire, a modern municipal division was introduced in the re-established Austrian Silesia. The villages as two separate municipalities were subscribed to the political and legal district of Bielsko. In 1855, a local line of the important Emperor Ferdinand Northern Railway was opened to traffic with a station in Dziedzice. This led to a rapid industrialization of Dziedzice and Czechowice, especially in the late 19th century. At that time, Czechowice and Dziedzice became strong centers of the Polish national movement in stark contrast to German-dominated town of Bielsko, whose inhabitants used to call the area of Czechowice and Dziedzice verfluchte polnische Winkel (cursed Polish corner). Polish school, pedagogical, sports and other organizations were established here.

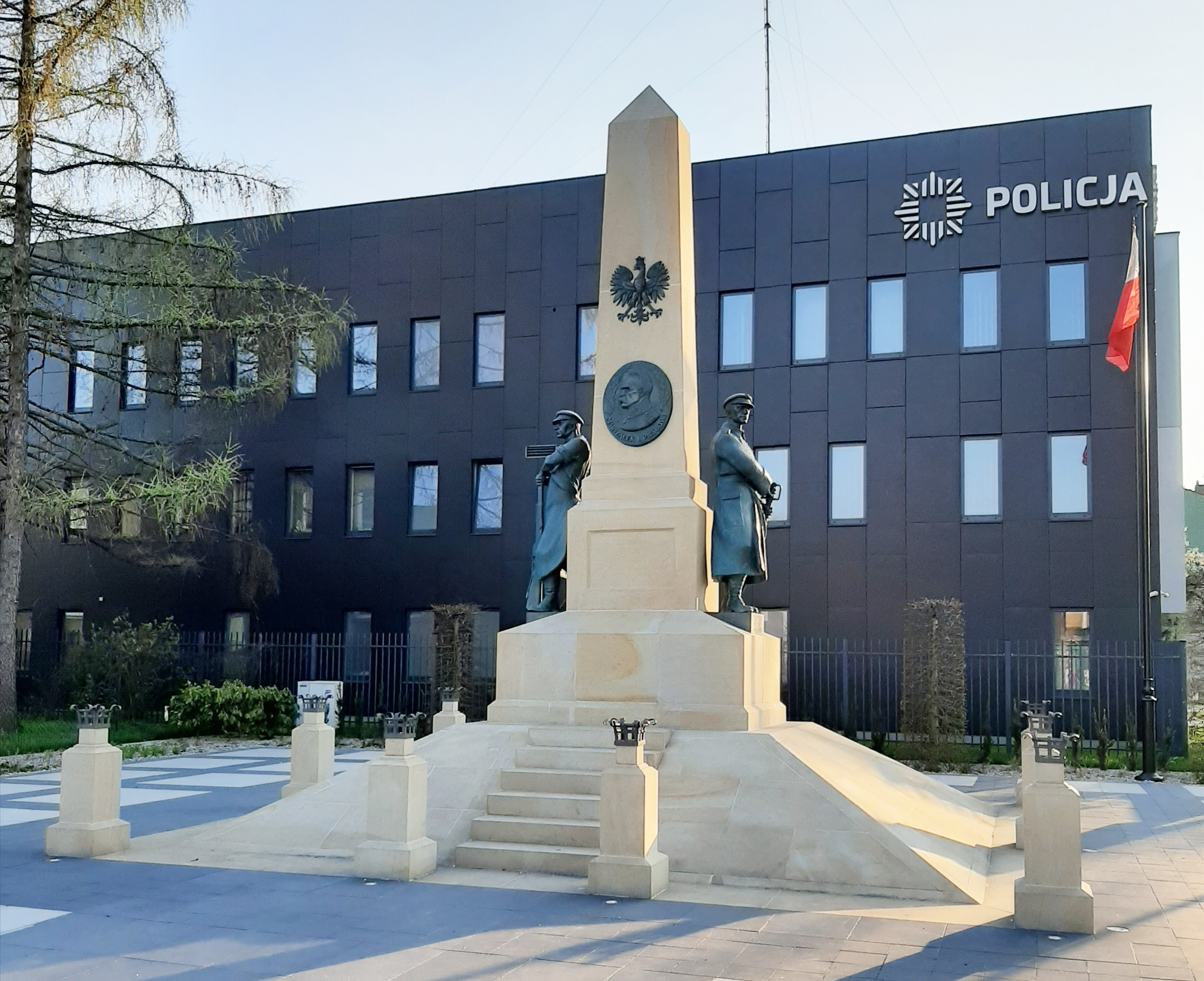
Freedom Monument (Pomnik Wolności) with the police station in the background

After World War I, fall of Austria-Hungary, the reestablishment of independent Poland, the Polish–Czechoslovak War and the division of Cieszyn Silesia in 1920, Czechowice and Dziedzice became a part of Poland. In the interwar period, the industry continued to expand. New factories were founded, which produced machines, bicycles, matches, paper, cables etc. New culture centers, amateur theaters, cinemas, choirs and sports clubs were founded. In 1924, the Freedom Monument (Pomnik Wolności) was unveiled, financed by voluntary contributions. Patriotic celebrations take place at the monument.

=== World War II ===
Czechowice and Dziedzice were annexed by Nazi Germany at the beginning of World War II in September 1939. The local population was subjected to deportations for forced labor into Germany and to concentration camps, expropriations, street round-ups, death sentences and public executions (see Nazi crimes against the Polish nation). Polish social and political life, as well as Polish education were being destroyed.

Six Poles from Czechowice and Dziedzice, including four policemen, were murdered by the Russians in the Katyn massacre in 1940.

In 1942, the Germans established two forced labor camps in the town: one for Poles (Polenlager) and one for Jewish men. The Polish resistance stole weapons from a Reich Labour Service camp in Czechowice. During the Oil Campaign of World War II, the oil refinery at Czechowice was bombed on August 20, 1944. In 1944, the occupiers established the Tschechowitz I and II subcamps of Auschwitz in Czechowice-Dziedzice, which provided forced labor for the SOCONY-Vacuum oil plant and housed over 600 prisoners. There were cases of prisoners being killed by SS guards while trying to accept food from Poles outside the camps or during escape attempts. On 18 January 1945, some 450 prisoners were sent on a death march towards Wodzisław Śląski. On 21 January 1945, the SS and SD massacred the remaining prisoners at the subcamp, with only several surviving the massacre. In 1945, German occupation ended and Czechowice and Dziedzice were restored to Poland.

=== Post-war period ===
In 1951, Dziedzice were merged with Czechowice, concurrently the expanded gmina was given town rights. However, the name of the new town was Czechowice, which disappointed the citizens of Dziedzice. After complaints in 1958, the town was renamed Czechowice-Dziedzice.

From 1975 to 1998, it was attached to the Katowice Voivodeship, and since 1999 to Silesian Voivodeship.

In 1993, a new Freedom Monument was erected in place of the former, destroyed by the Germans in 1939.

== Landmarks ==
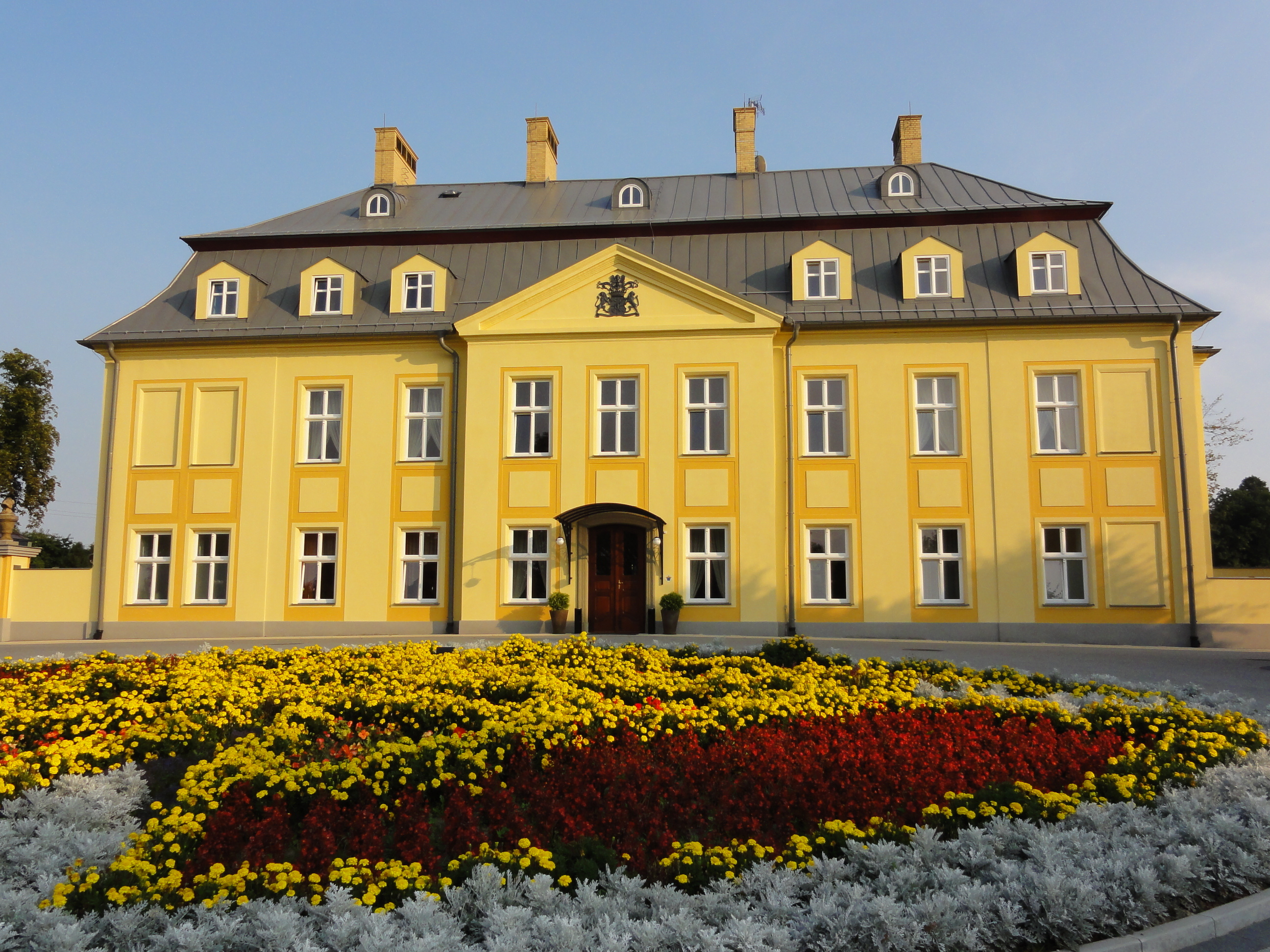
Kotuliński Palace

Among the town's landmarks are the Rococo Kotuliński Palace, the Baroque Saint Catherine Church and the Gothic Revival Saint Mary of Help church.

== Demographics ==
According to the censuses conducted in 1880, 1890, 1900 and 1910, the population of Czechowice grew from 2,804 in 1880 to 7,056 in 1910 with a dwindling majority being native Polish-speakers (from 96.6% in 1880 to 86.7% in 1910) accompanied by a growing German-speaking minority (from 95 or 3.4% in 1880 to 611 or 8.9% in 1910) and Czech-speaking (from 33 or 1.1% in 1890 to 290 or 4.3% in 1910), in terms of religion in 1910 majority were Roman Catholics (94.1%), followed by Protestants (231 or 3.3%), Jews (176 or 2.5%) and 9 people adhering to yet another faith.

In case of Dziedzice, the population of the municipality grew from 1,011 in 1880 to 2,436 in 1910 with a majority being native Polish-speakers (between 748 or 78% in 1880 and 1,994 or 85.1% in 1910, at most 938 or 92.1% in 1890) accompanied by a German-speaking minority (189 or 19.7% in 1880, then at most 266 or 11.4% in 1910) and Czech-speaking (at most 81 or 3.5% in 1910), in terms of religion in 1910 majority were Roman Catholics (88.6%), followed by Jews (185 or 7.6%) and Protestants (93 or 3.8%).

After Poland regained independence, the population of Czechowice and the Dziedzice municipality further grew to 8,436 and 2,906, with Poles forming 95.9% and 97.4% of the population, and the German minority dwindling to 3.4% and 2.0%, respectively, according to the 1921 Polish census.

== Sports ==
The local football team is MRKS Czechowice-Dziedzice. It competes in the lower leagues.

== Twin towns – sister cities ==
See twin towns of Gmina Czechowice-Dziedzice.

== Notable people ==
- Piotr Beczała (born 1966), operatic tenor
- Ludwik Maciej (1915–2007), Polish World War II military pilot
- Łukasz Piszczek (born 1985), footballer

== Gallery ==
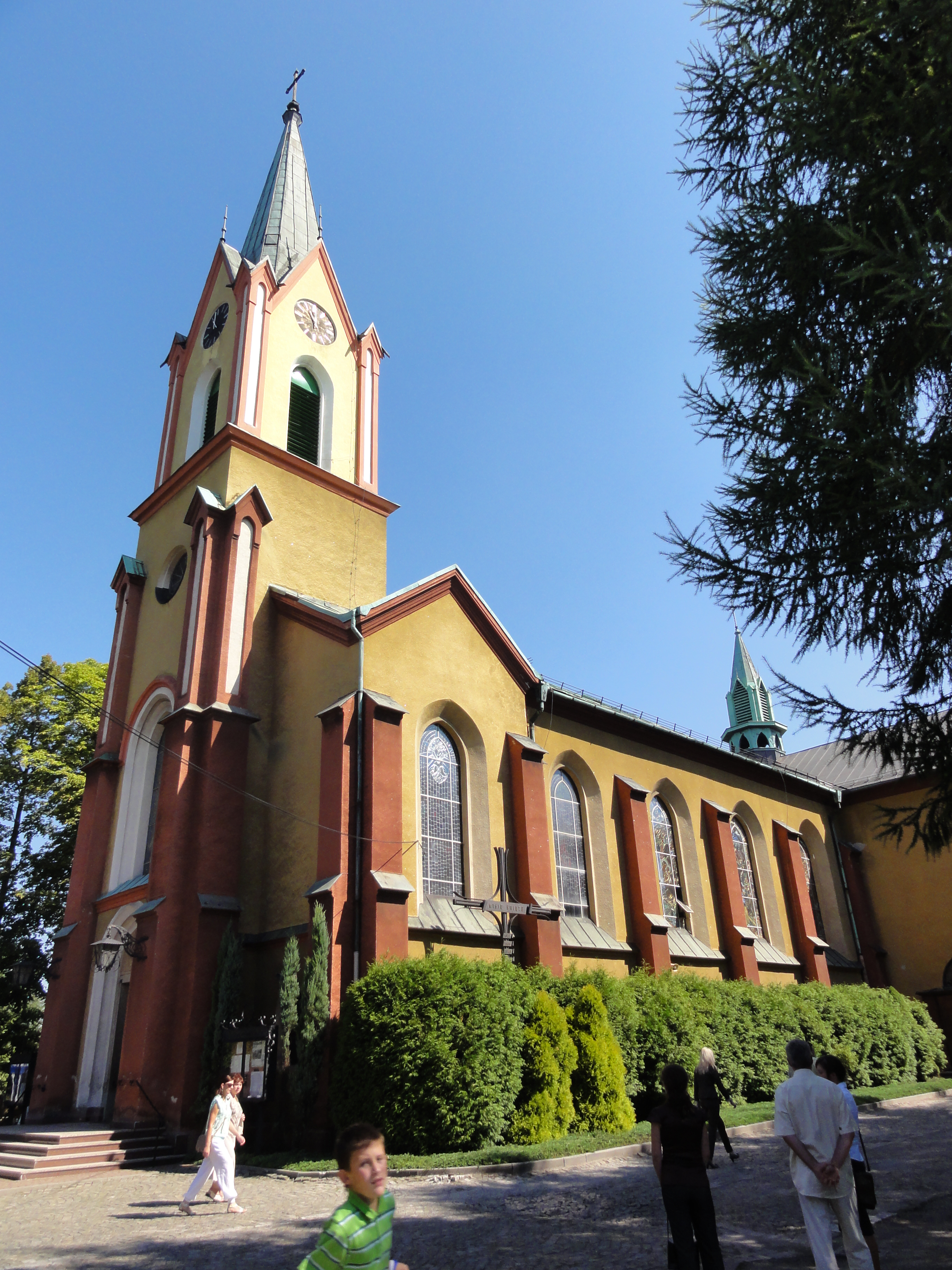
Saint Mary of Help church

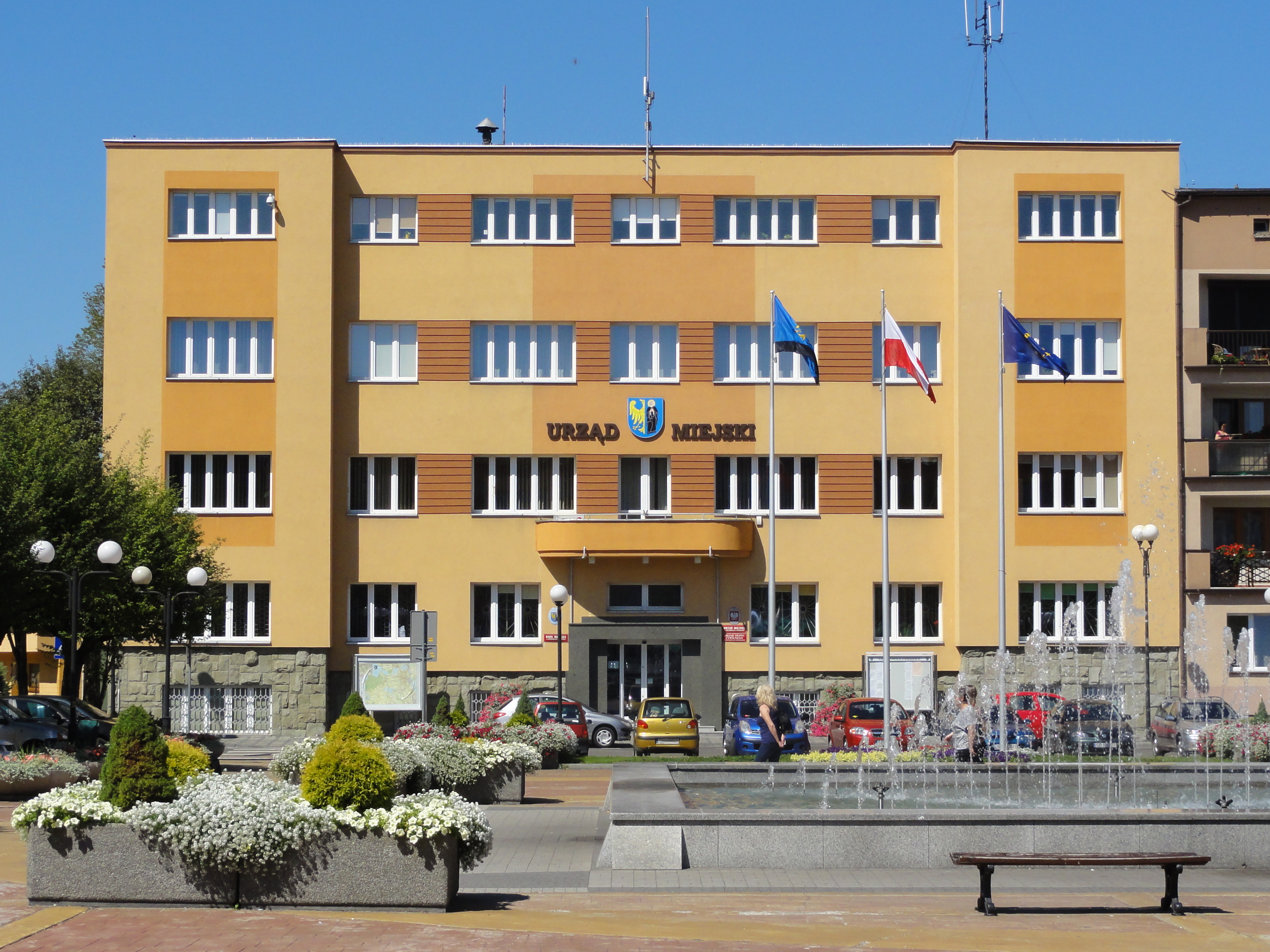
Town hall

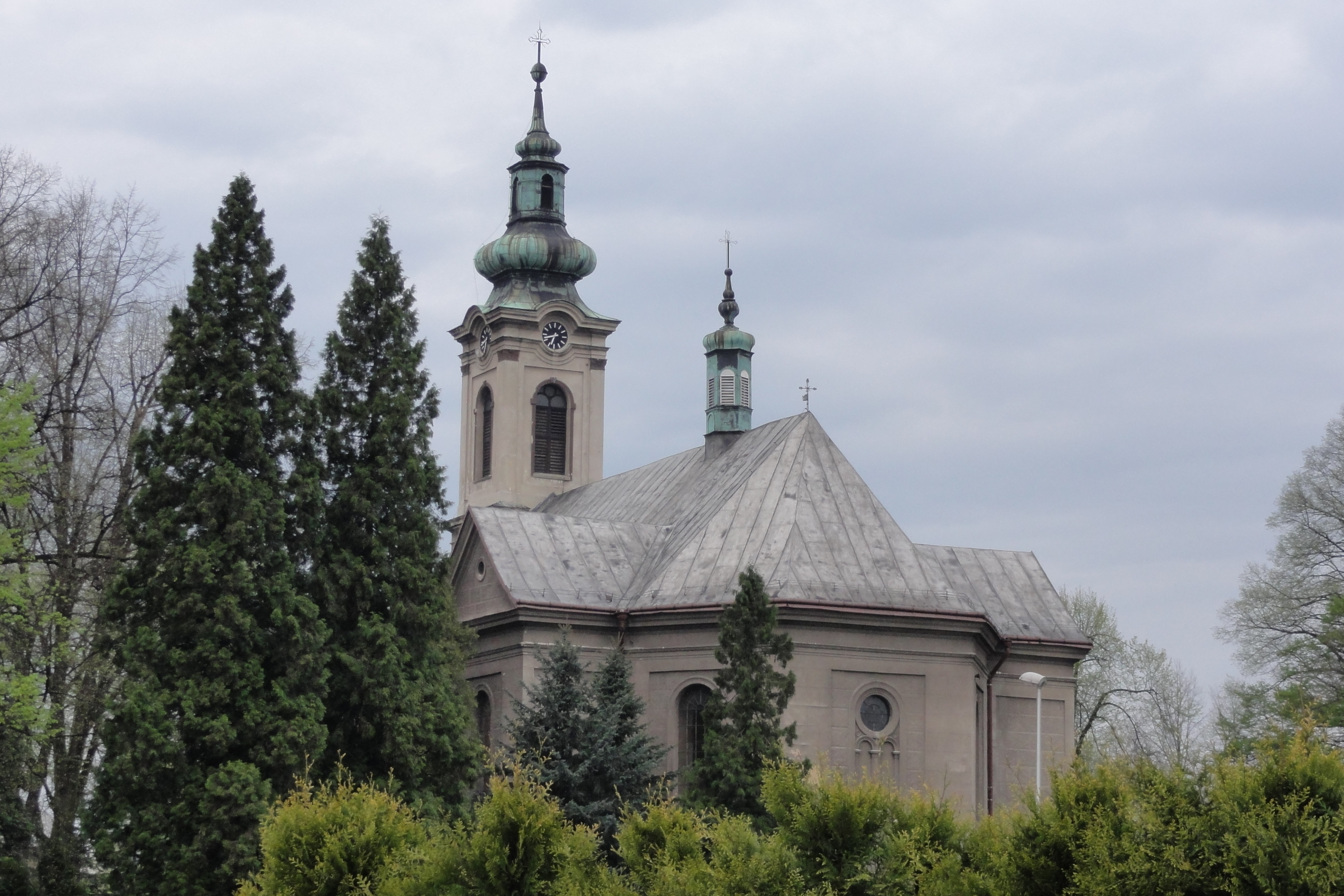
The oldest church of St. Catherine

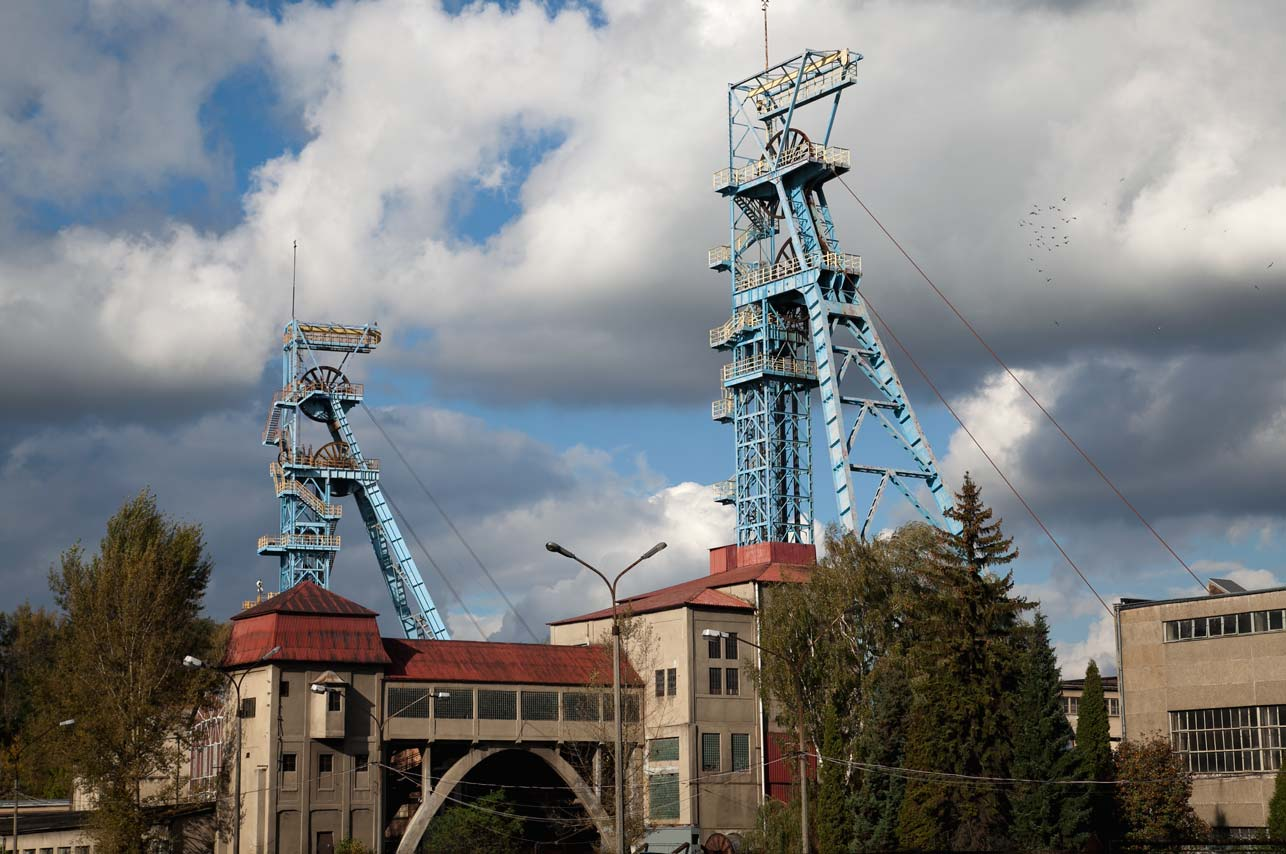
Silesia coal mine

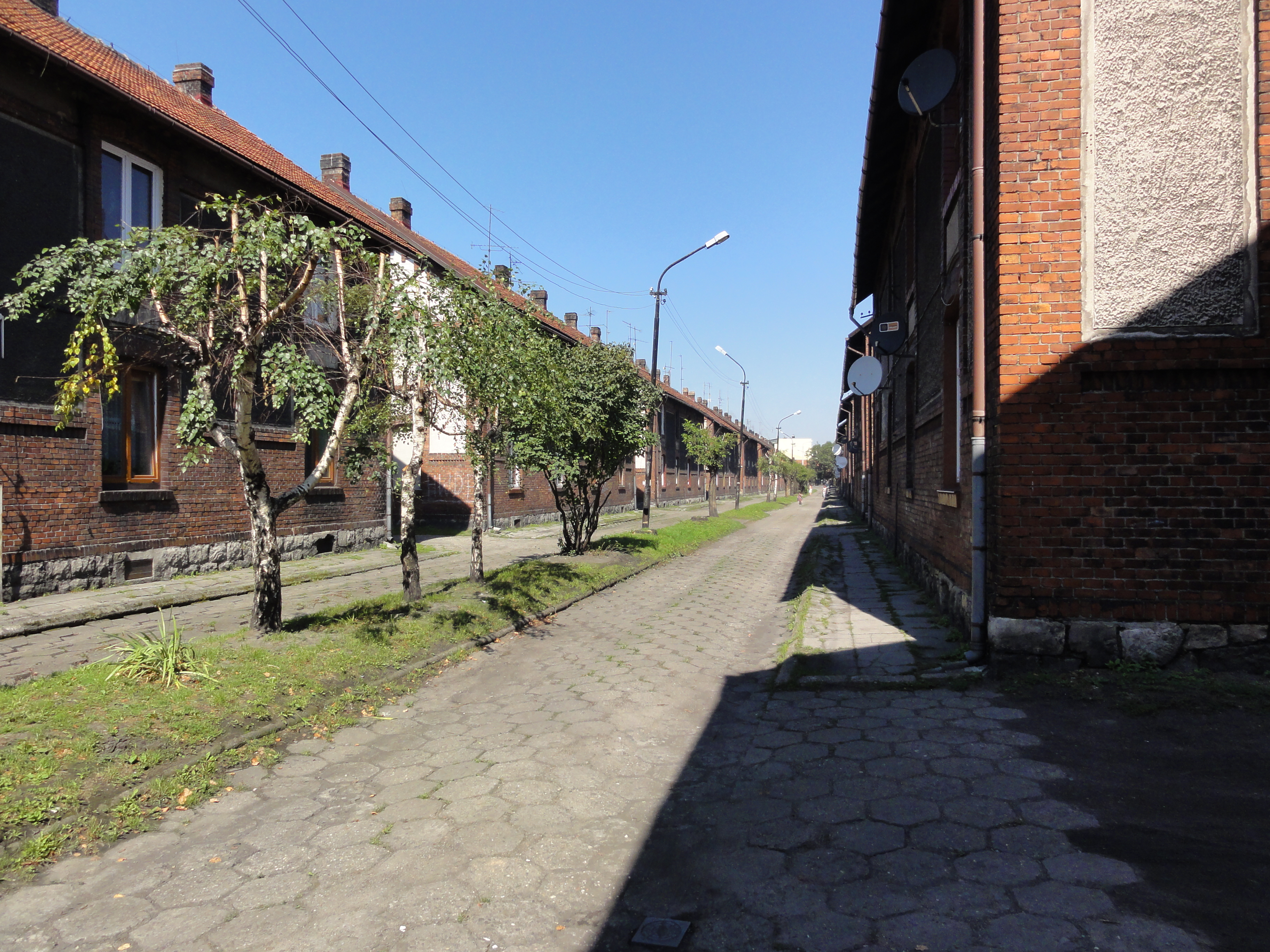
Workers' houses in Żebracz

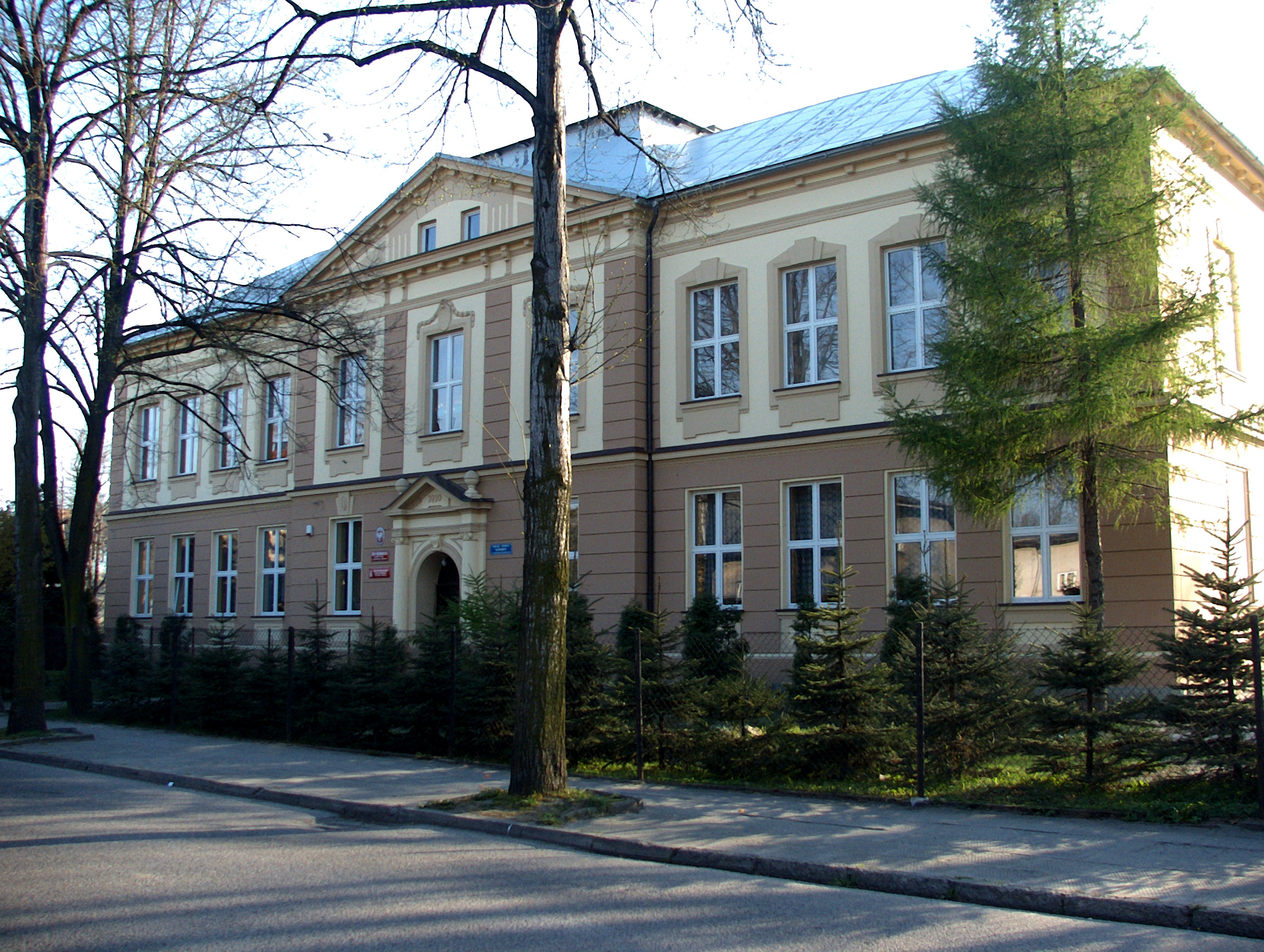
Primary school
