= Ligota, Silesian Voivodeship =

Ligota
- Village
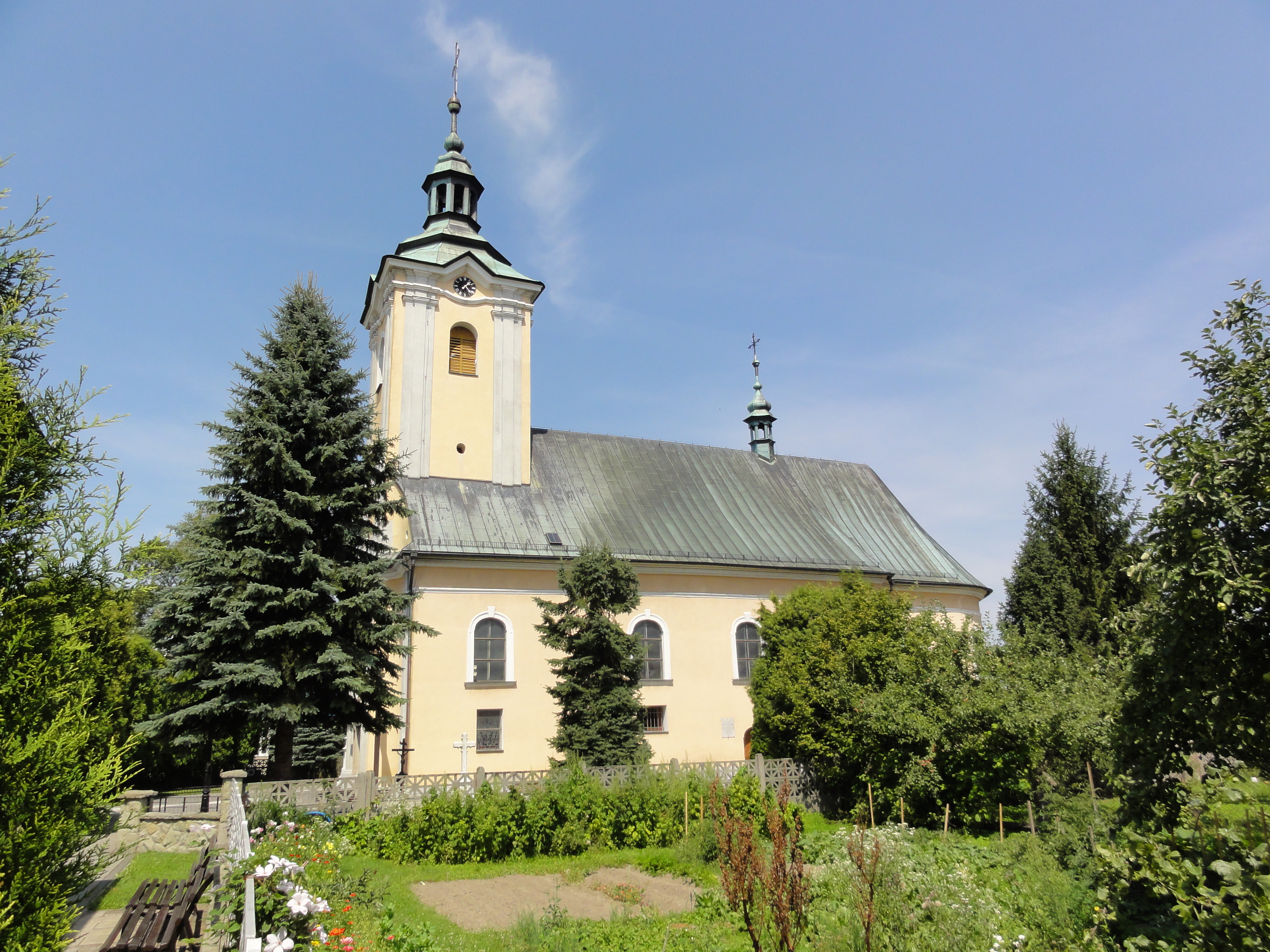
- Church of the Divine Providence

- Location within Poland
- Coordinates: 49°52′50″N 18°56′54″E
- Country: Poland
- Voivodeship: Silesian
- County: Bielsko
- Gmina: Czechowice-Dziedzice
- First mentioned: 1452

Government
  - Mayor: Stanisław Słowik

Area
  - Total: 14.0 km^{2} (5.4 sq mi)

Population (2008)
  - Total: 4,454
  - Density: 318/km^{2} (824/sq mi)
- Time zone: UTC+1 (CET)
  - Summer (DST): UTC+2 (CEST)
- Postal code: 43-518
- Car plates: SBI

Ligota is a village in Gmina Czechowice-Dziedzice, Bielsko County, Silesian Voivodeship, southern Poland. It lies on the edge of the historical region of Cieszyn Silesia.

Ligota is a common name for villages in Western Poland. The word refers to the medieval custom of village founders being exempt from paying duties to their lords for a period of 5–8 years.

== History ==
The village was first mentioned in 1452 as Elgot. Politically the village belonged initially to the Duchy of Teschen, a fee of the Kingdom of Bohemia, which after 1526 became part of the Habsburg monarchy.

After Revolutions of 1848 in the Austrian Empire a modern municipal division was introduced in the re-established Austrian Silesia. The village as a municipality was subscribed to the political and legal district of Bielsko. According to the censuses conducted in 1880, 1890, 1900 and 1910 the population of the municipality grew from 1651 in 1880 to 1791 in 1910 with a majority being native Polish-speakers (at least 94.1% in 1880, at most 99.4% in 1890) accompanied by a small German-speaking minority (at most 96 or 5.9% in 1880). In terms of religion in 1910 the majority were Roman Catholics (90.4%), followed by Protestants (142 or 7.9%), Jews (31 or 1.7%).

After World War I, fall of Austria-Hungary, Polish–Czechoslovak War and the division of Cieszyn Silesia in 1920, it became a part of Poland. It was then annexed by Nazi Germany at the beginning of World War II. After the war it was restored to Poland.

== Landmarks ==
There are several landmarks in the village including Catholic Church of the Divine Providence from 1801 to 1806 and old dwór (manor house).
