= Lhota =

Lhota is a Czech geographical name. It is the most common name for villages in the Czech Republic.

== Geography ==
There are 309 villages that contain Lhota or Lhotka (which is a diminutive of Lhota) in their name, which makes it the most common name of villages in the Czech Republic. In addition, there are dozens of villages with derivations of those names (Lhotice, Lhoty, Lhůta and Lhůty in the Czech Republic, Lehota and Lehôtka in Slovakia). The largest Lhotas are Dolní Lhota and Komorní Lhotka in the Moravian-Silesian Region, and Francova Lhota and Ostrožská Lhota in the Zlín Region, all of which have about 1,500 inhabitants.

== History and etymology ==
Lhotas were founded during the Middle Ages colonization in Bohemia, Moravia and Slovakia. Most of them were founded in the 13th century and the first half of the 14th century. The name was first mentioned in 1199, but this first documented Lhota was later renamed Svatý Jiří.

The inhabitants of newly-founded villages had obligations towards suzerains, but those duties were usually suspended for a certain period (such as 5–8 years) as a compensation for felling of forests and making the land available for agriculture. The period used to be called "lhóta" (i.e. 'grace period') and often became a part of the village name.

The villages were usually established by local inhabitants: lower noblemen close to their own village. The name of the founder, usually of a Slavic origin, became sometimes a part of village name such as Vlachova Lhota ("Vlach's Lhota"). In other cases, the adjective in village name relates to its size (Dlouhá Lhota = "Long Lhota") or other characteristics (Dolní Lhota = "Lower Lhota", Písková Lhota = "Sandy Lhota").

== See also ==
- Wola (settlement), a similar concept in Polish history
- Sloboda, a similar concept in Russian history
