= Ludwik Maciej =

Recipient of the Cross of Valour

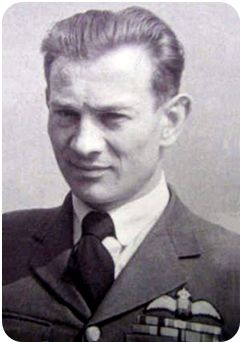
- Born: May 16, 1915
- Died: March 12, 2007 (aged 91); Los Angeles, California, United States
- Burial place: Church of the Blessed Virgin Mary cemetery
- Military career
- Unit: No. 300 'Land of Masovia' Bomber Squadron
- Conflicts: World War II
- Awards: War Order of Virtuti Militari, Cross of Valor (three times), September Campaign Cross, 'Poland to Her Defender' Medal, 1939-1945 Star, Air Crew Europe Star, France and Germany Star, War Medal 1939-1945, International Prisoners Of War, Croix de Guerre, and other

Ludwik Maciej (May 16, 1915 – March 12, 2007) was a Polish military pilot, who participated in World War II.

== Early life ==
Son of Jan and Anna (née Donocik), Ludwik Maciej graduated from Primary School in his hometown of Dziedzice and continued his education in a Grammar School in Bielsko (presently Nicolas Copernicus High School in Bielsko-Biała). During his school years he played football for 'Grażyna', which was part of the 'Sokół' ("Falcon") Polish Gymnastic Society.

== Military service ==
Having voluntarily joined the military forces in 1935, he took his military oath and after becoming a qualified pilot, he joined the 2nd Air Force Regiment in Rakowice-Czyżyny, Kraków as a member of the 24th Combat Squadron.

=== September 1939 ===
During the invasion of Poland, the Luftwaffe destroyed his military base and although Maciej was a trained pilot, he did not take part in combat at this stage.:

In September 1938, thanks to flying officer Tadeusz Nowierski, I was temporarily transferred from the 24th Combat Squadron to a training unit in order to become a piloting instructor. As the PWS 26 piloting course had finished right before the war broke out, both myself and my students were, as an exception, told to take some time off. It was in my hometown of Dziedzice where I received an urgent cable to immediately report for duty at my Regiment. Airplanes stationed at our base were to be evacuated. I had to fly to Lviv twice – the second time in a PWS 26. I finally arrived back at the base, checked out my parachute at the guardhouse and, exhausted, crawled to the barracks – all at the last night before our airport was bombed. At dawn, the bombing started. The barracks were also under heavy fire from strafing planes, as a result of which the hangars caught fire. Some people were killed, others – wounded. After the second airstrike, all was lost, leaving our command helpless. I was then ordered to check a shot-down German plane in the Olkusz area. I took a RWD 8, but I couldn't find anything. That turned out to be my last flight during the September Campaign. The 24th Squadron and its 'Karaś' planes were grouped at that time at Wołyń airfield. Czyżyny was evacuated by rail. My personal belongings were also destroyed due to a German airstrike in Jarosław. All I had now was my Vis gun, 1,000 złotys, and some rusks. On September 17–18, 1939, together with other training unit members, I arrived by bus at the border and, as internees, we all entered the territory of Romania.

=== French campaign ===
Equipped with new documents, Ludwik Maciej managed to get from Romania to France. There he was trained to fly light bombers, most of which represented the older type of aircraft, 'Amiot 143', 'Farman F.220' and 'Bloch MB.210' to name a few, with the exception of 'Potez 63-11', which was a relatively new aircraft. The training course, originally took place in Rennes, later transferred to Clermont-Ferrand due to the German advancement towards Brittany. At the beginning of June 1940, Ludwik Maciej was again transferred to Toulouse, where the training was concluded.

=== Battle of Britain ===
When France capitulated, he boarded the ship SS Arandora Star at the port of Saint Jean de Luz and arrived in Liverpool. Eventually he travelled to the Bramcote Royal Air Force station, where he was trained to undertake night-time flights on Vickers Wellington bombers. Later, under the command of Lt Col Wacław Makowski, Ludwik Maciej became a bomber pilot in No. 300 'Land of Masovia' Bomber Squadron, which remained part of the Royal Air Force until the end of the war. He took part in various missions of the squadron between August 1940 and June 12, 1941. It was during the night on the return flight from a bombing mission of the Ruhr industrial area, that his aircraft was shot over Düsseldorf. With a damaged engine, he managed to get as far as the English Channel, where he was forced to ditch into the North Sea. With an injured leg, he and the remaining members of his crew were taken prisoner by a German crew aboard a Blohm & Voss BV 138 flying boat.

=== Captivity ===
Having undergone treatment at the hospital in Amsterdam, as Prisoner 39140, Ludwik Maciej was later held captive in a number of pilots' prisoner-of-war camps – in Frankfurt am Main, at Bad Sulza in Thuringia, at Stalag Luft III in Żagań, at Stalag Luft VII in Bąków near Częstochowa and at Stalag Luft IV in Tychowo. As a result of mass executions and inhuman conditions, each of these camps were responsible for the death of thousands of people. At the beginning of 1945, surviving prisoners were evacuated and three months later, having travelled via Kołobrzeg, Świnoujście, Schwerin, Luneburg and Celle, they reached Lutov, where they were liberated by the British army.

== Orders and military awards ==
Ludwik Maciej was awarded the following orders and military awards: The War Order of Virtuti Militari, The Cross of Valor (three times), The September Campaign Cross, The 'Poland to Her Defender' Medal, as well as a number of international medals, including 1939-1945 Star, Air Crew Europe Star, France and Germany Star, War Medal 1939-1945, International Prisoners Of War, and the Croix de Guerre.

On December 5, 2005, Warrant Officer Ludwik Maciej was awarded the title of The Honorary Citizen of Czechowice-Dziedzice by the City Council of Czechowice-Dziedzice.

== Personal life ==
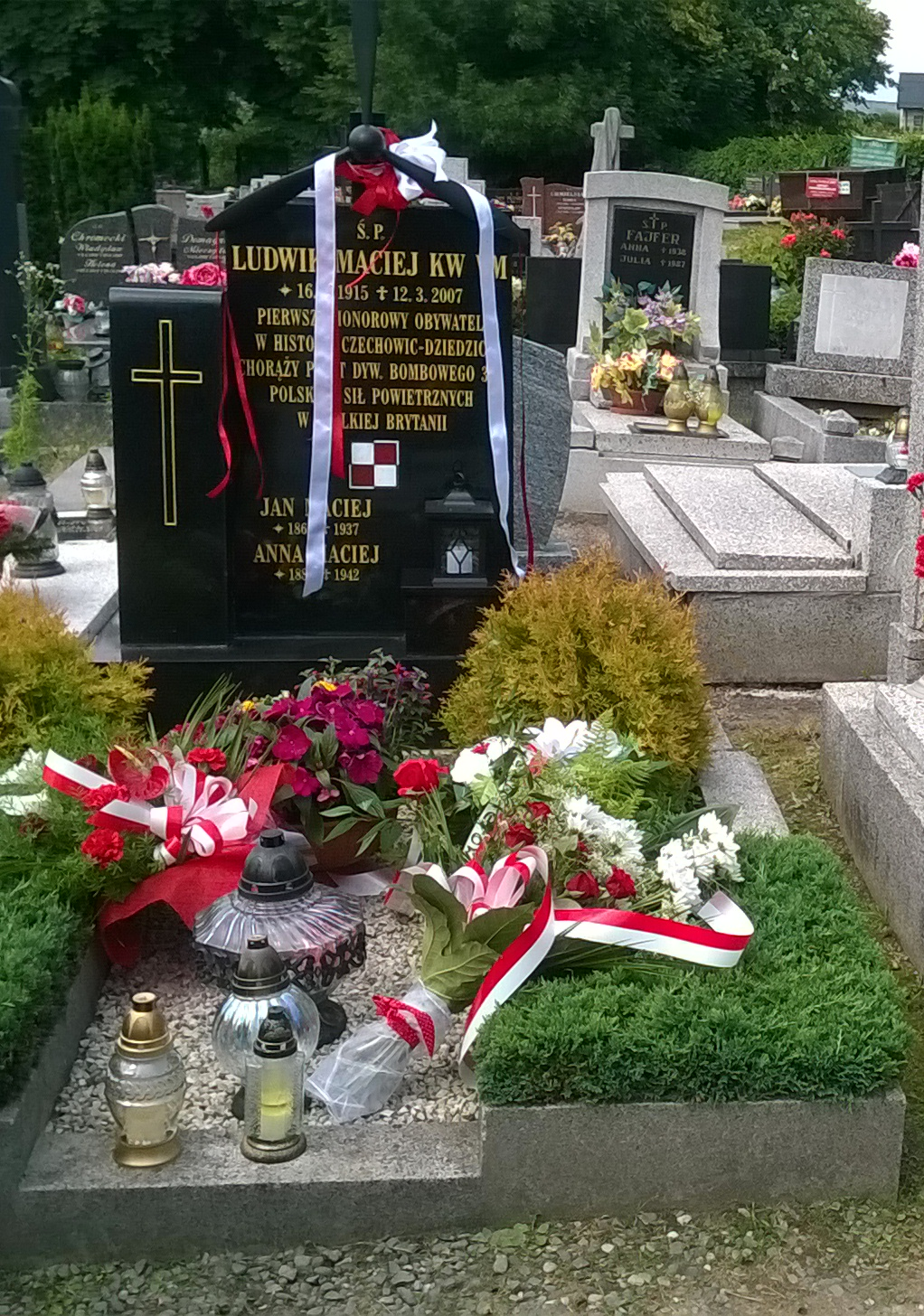
Grave of Ludwik Maciej in Czechowice-Dziedzice

After the war, Ludwik Maciej stayed in England and settled in the city of Lincoln. Whilst in Blackpool, he met Janina Gwizdak, his future wife. On April 14, 1946, they got married and remained in Lincoln together. In 1949, Ludwik Maciej and his family emigrated to Argentina. They firstly settled in the vicinity of Buenos Aires. Later they relocated to the north of the country, Cordoba and Salta Provinces and to the southern city of San Carlos de Bariloche. Ludwik Maciej worked as a welder at a power plant and as a car factory worker. In March 1961, he and his family emigrated to the USA, where they settled in Los Angeles, California. Ludwik Maciej had two sons, Sylwester and Luis, neither of whom were born in Poland.

== Death ==
Ludwik Maciej died on March 12, 2007, in Los Angeles, California, and was buried on April 10, 2007, at the cemetery at Church of the Blessed Virgin Mary. With the help of Christians in Czechowice-Dziedzice, his ashes were brought from the US by his son and buried in Ludwik Maciej's family grave at the cemetery.
