= Kotuliński Palace =

Historic palace in Czechowice-Dziedzice, Silesian Voivodeship, Poland

- Pałac Kotulińskich
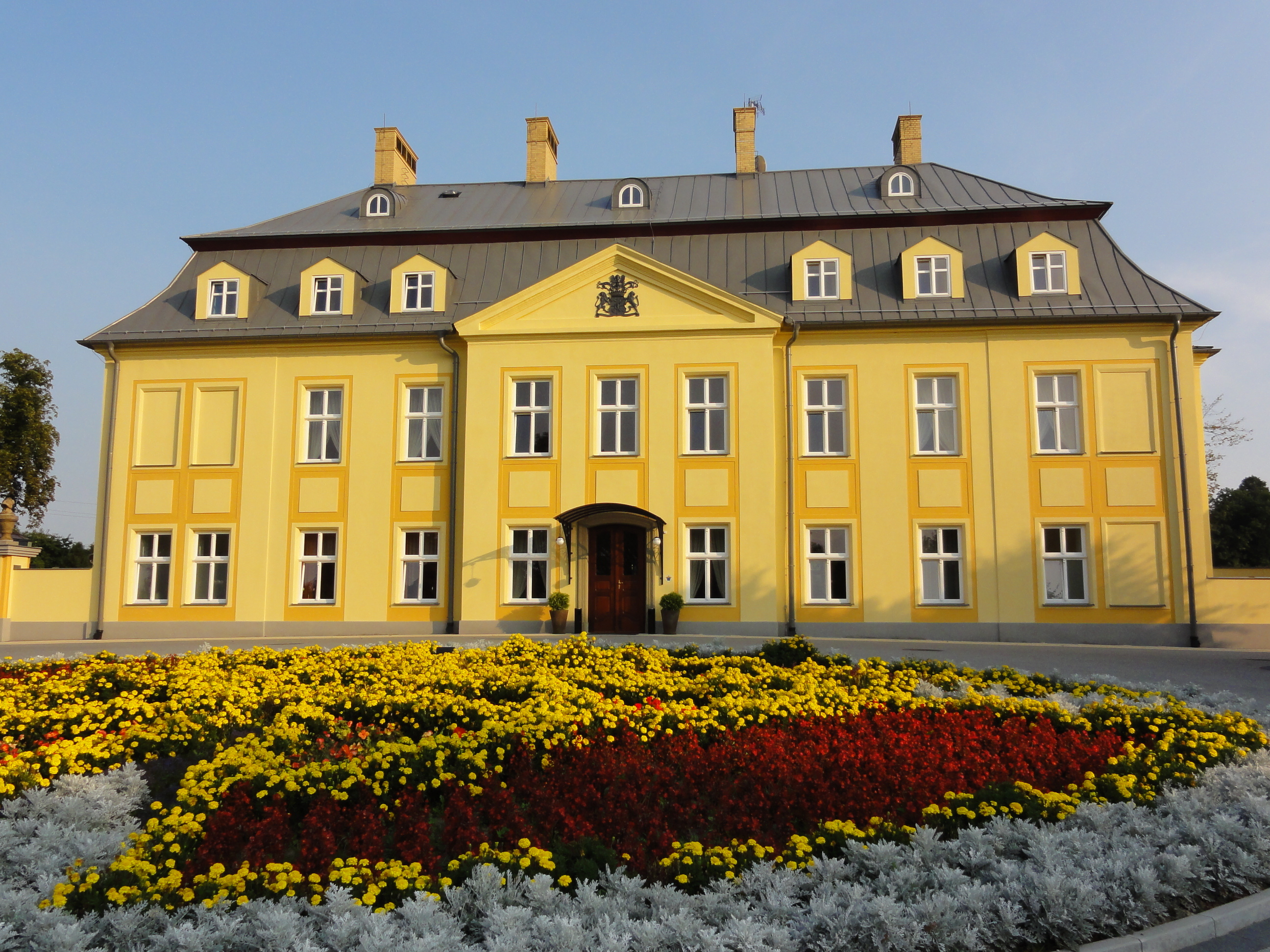
- Interactive map of the Kotuliński Palace area

General information
- Architectural style: Rococo
- Location: Czechowice-Dziedzice, Poland
- Completed: 1730s
- Owner: Piotr Londzin

Kotuliński Palace (Polish: Pałac Kotulińskich) is a palace located in Czechowice-Dziedzice at Zamkowa Street.

== History ==
Czechowice was acquired by Fryderyk Aleksander, baron Kotuliński of Kotulin, in 1675. His son and successor Franciszek Karol Kotuliński became the archchancellor of Lower and Upper Silesia, starosta of the Duchy of Głogów and around 1730 he decided to build a residence befitting this position. In 1765, Count Andrzej Renard became the new owner of Czechowice and the palace after buying it for 62,000 Rhine guilders. The Renard family owned it until 1856, and by then they had beautified the palace, established a flower garden and a fruit orchard. they also built a gardener's house. The coat of arms of the Renard family, supported by two lions, was suspended in the triangular tympanum topping the avant-corps. Over the next years, the owners of the palace and the Czechowice estate were Baron Bernhard Heldreich, Joseph Heiser and Ödenburger Allgemeine Bank from Sopron in Hungary. The last private owners were the Zipser family, factory owners from nearby Bielsko. At the beginning of the 20th century, at the back of the palace, a three-sided glass veranda was added on the ground floor, housing a winter garden. In 1945, the palace was nationalized and an agricultural school was established there. The palace was entered into the register of monuments on February 24, 1960. In the early 1990s, the palace became the property of the city of Czechowice-Dziedzice and a professional development center operated there.

In 2001, the palace was bought by Pascal Polska with the intention of establishing a luxury hotel there. However, it was not implemented due to the company's financial problems. In October 2006, the palace was bought by Polplast, which started protecting the facility against further devastation. The Rococo palace has been thoroughly restored, the interior and the park have been restored to their former glory. The facility has been transformed into a four-star hotel. The renovation of the monument was co-financed by the Provincial Conservator of Monuments in Katowice.

On September 4, 2017, the District Court in Bielsko-Biała announced the bankruptcy of Polplast, the owner of the Palace. The facility was put up for sale. Due to the lack of interest in the first auction, when the starting price of the Palace was 5.2 million złoty, the historic equipment of the facility was excluded from the second round of sale. In this way, the Kotuliński Palace was purchased by a private entrepreneur.

== Gallery ==
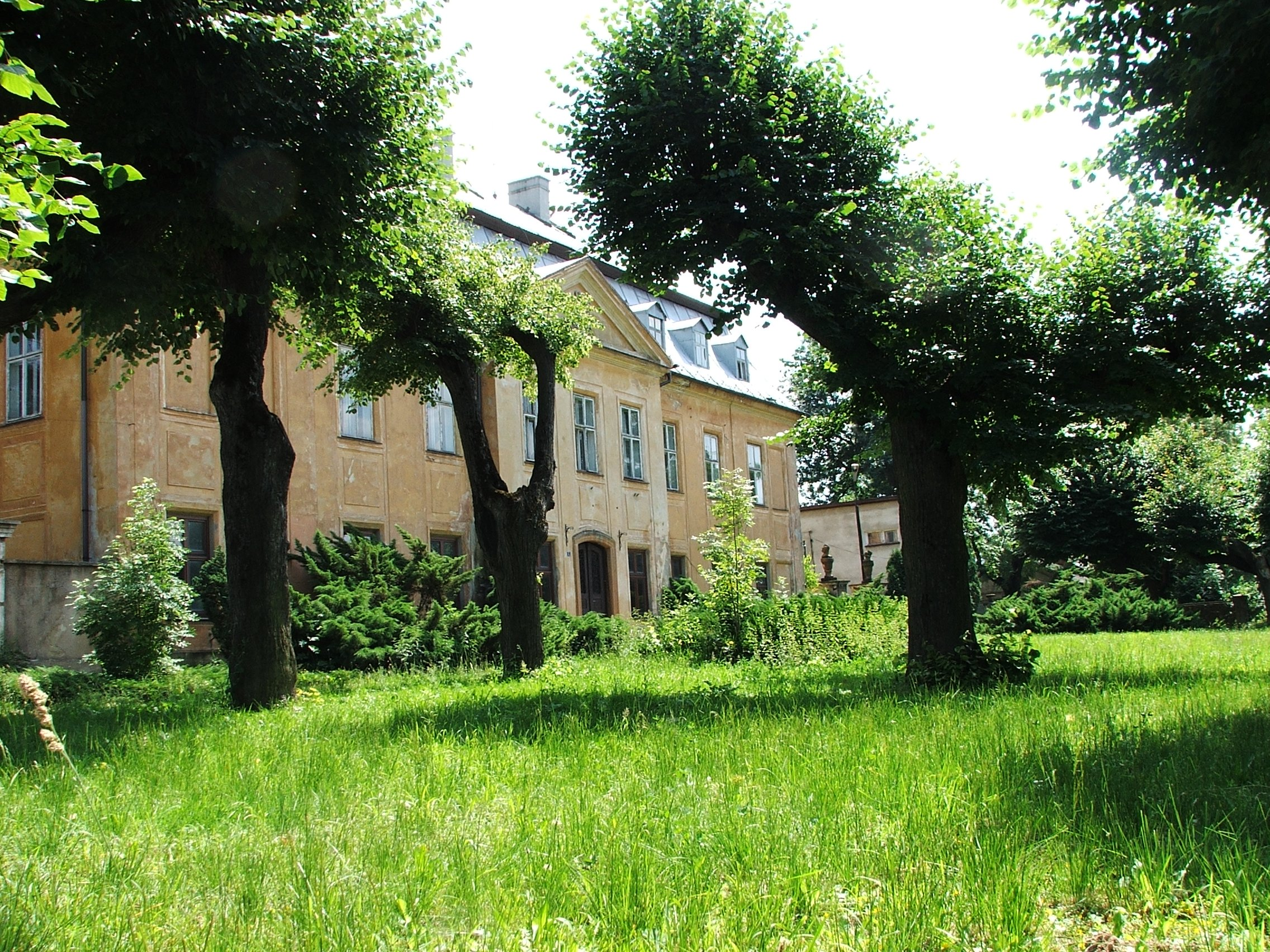
The palace before renovation

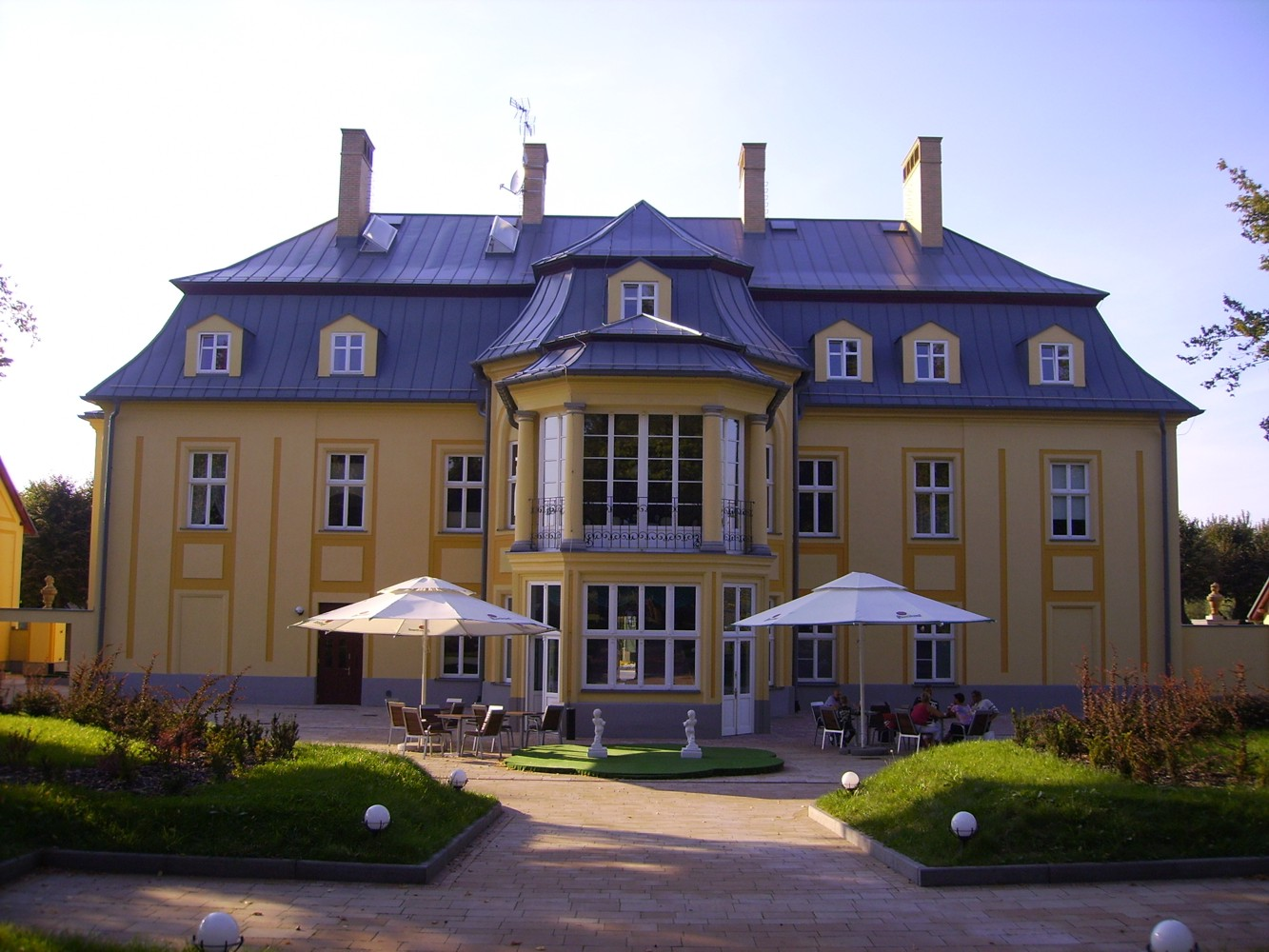
The palace after renovation

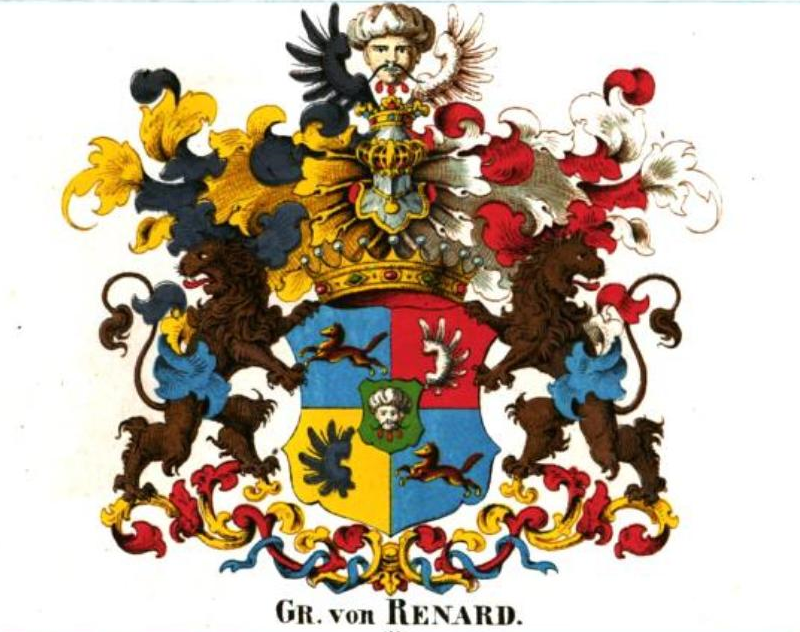
Coat of arms of von Renard

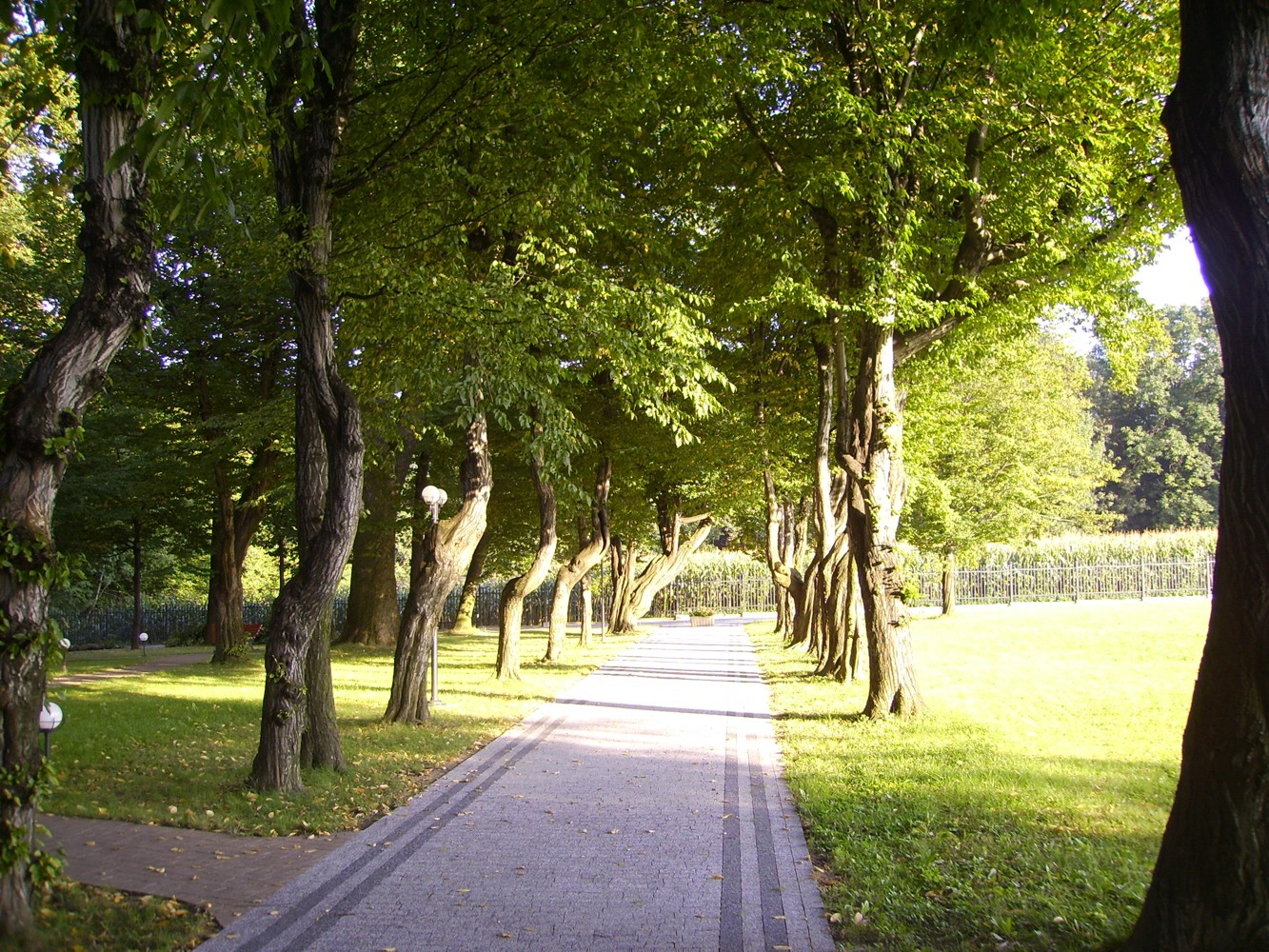
Park

== Bibliography ==
- Makowski, Mariusz (2005). Szlacheckie siedziby na Śląsku Cieszyńskim. Cieszyn: Regio/Muzeum Śląska Cieszyńskiego. pp. 292–295. ISBN 80-239-6051-2.
