= Gmina Czechowice-Dziedzice =

Gmina Czechowice-Dziedzice Czechowice-Dziedzice Commune
- Gmina
- Flag Coat of arms

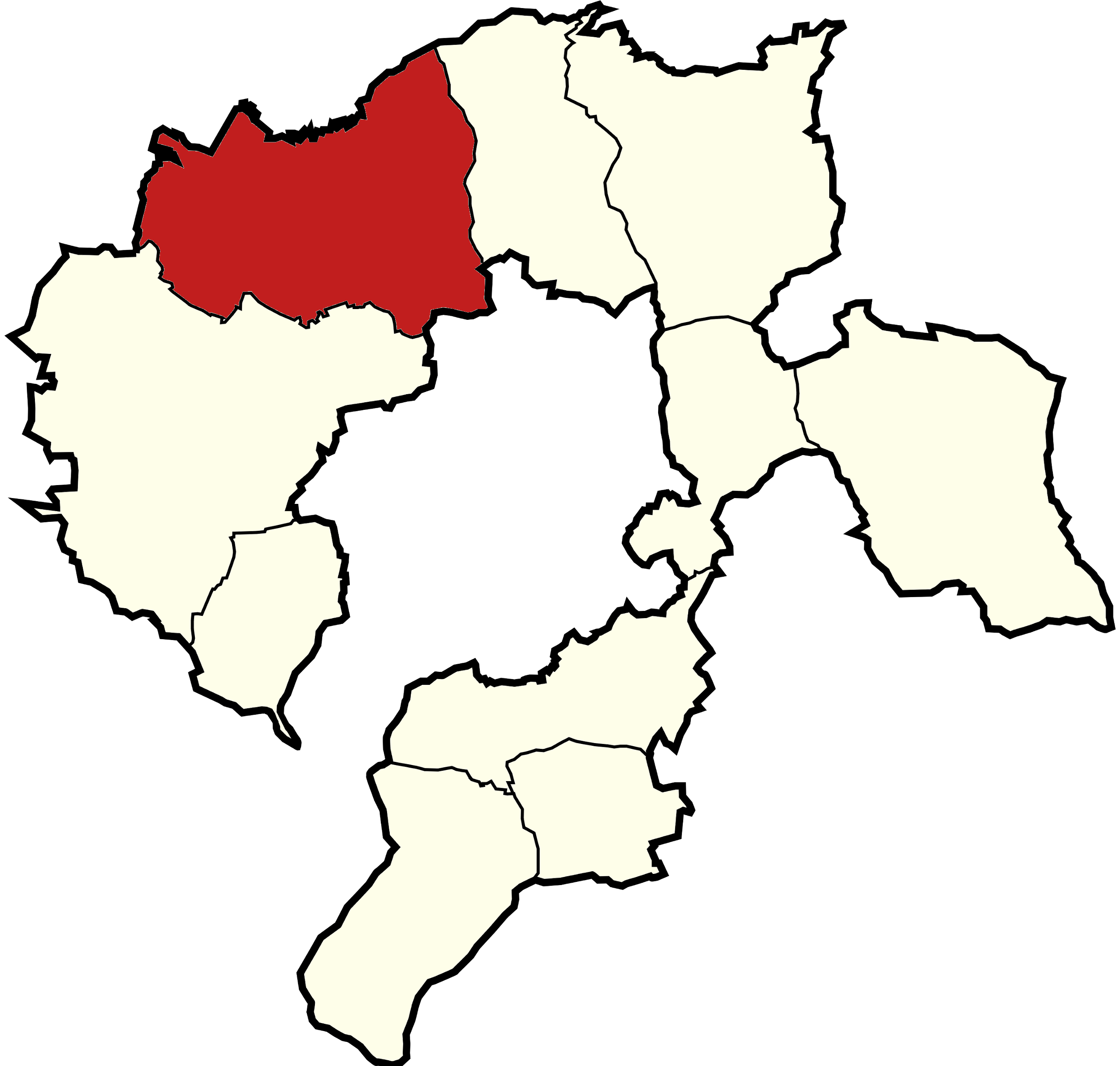
- Gmina Czechowice-Dziedzice within the Bielsko County
- Coordinates (Czechowice-Dziedzice): 49°54′47″N 19°0′23″E
- Country: Poland
- Voivodeship: Silesian
- County: Bielsko
- Seat: Czechowice-Dziedzice

Area
  - Total: 66.28 km^{2} (25.59 sq mi)

Population (2019-06-30)
  - Total: 45,451
  - Density: 685.7/km^{2} (1,776/sq mi)
  - Urban: 35,926
  - Rural: 9,525
- Website: http://www.czechowice-dziedzice.pl

Gmina Czechowice-Dziedzice is an urban-rural gmina (administrative district) in Bielsko County, Silesian Voivodeship, in southern Poland. Its seat is the town of Czechowice-Dziedzice, which lies approximately 13 kilometres (8 mi) north-west of Bielsko-Biała and 36 km (22 mi) south of the regional capital Katowice.

The gmina covers an area of 66.28 square kilometres (25.6 sq mi), and as of 2019 its total population is 45,451.

== Villages ==
Apart from the town of Czechowice-Dziedzice, the gmina contains the villages of Bronów, Ligota and Zabrzeg.

== Neighbouring gminas ==
Gmina Czechowice-Dziedzice is bordered by the city of Bielsko-Biała and by the gminas of Bestwina, Chybie, Goczałkowice-Zdrój, Jasienica and Pszczyna.

== Twin towns – sister cities ==
Gmina Czechowice-Dziedzice is twinned with:

- Cortona, Italy
- Hiddenhausen, Germany
- Łomża, Poland
- Orlová, Czech Republic
- Rajec, Slovakia
- Slonim, Belarus
