= Bronów, Silesian Voivodeship =

Bronów
- Village
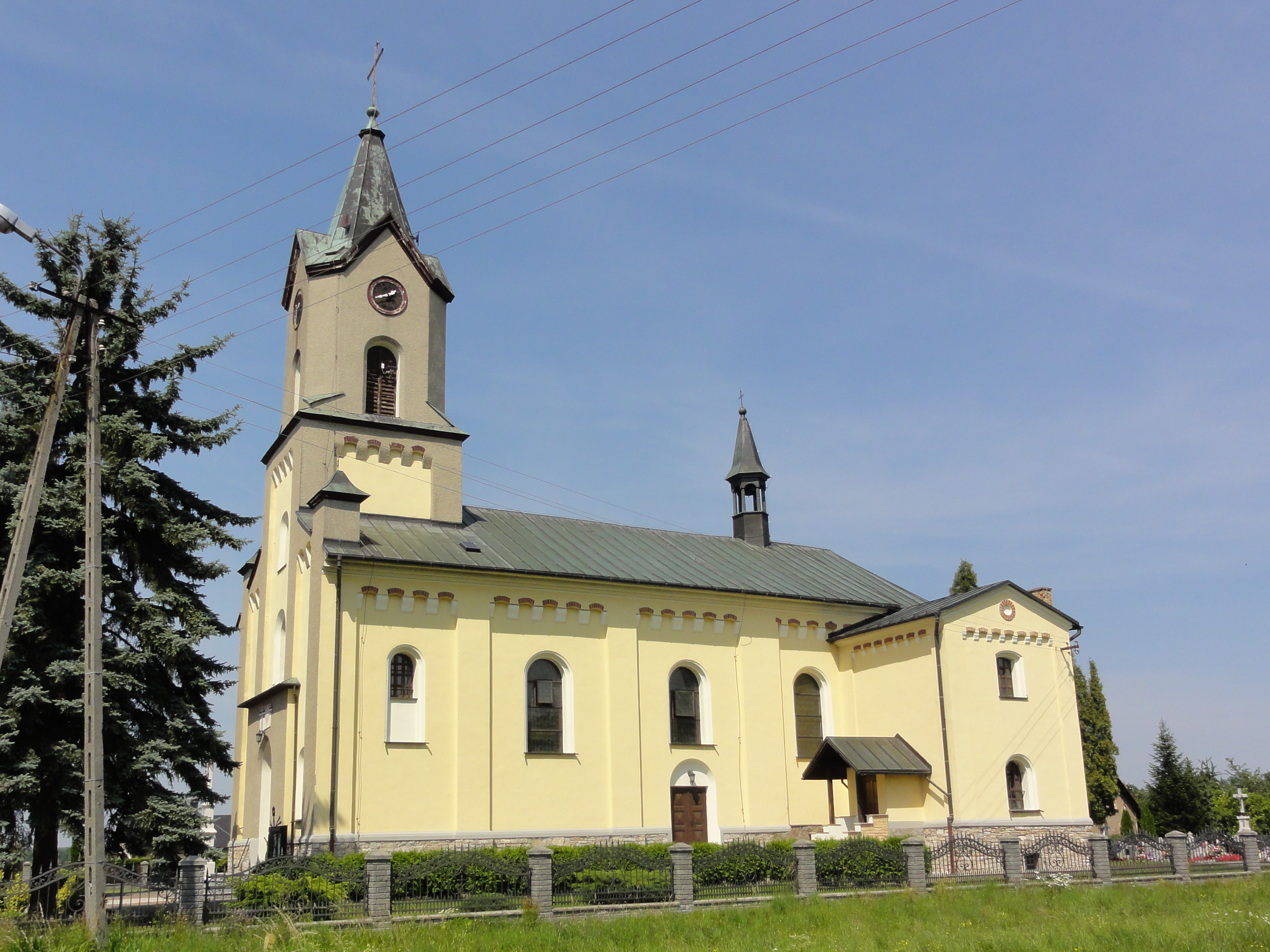
- Church of the Holiest Heart of Christ

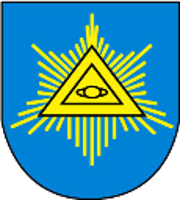
- Coat of arms

- Location within Poland
- Coordinates: 49°52′40.75″N 18°55′17.9″E
- Country: Poland
- Voivodeship: Silesian
- County: Bielsko
- Gmina: Czechowice-Dziedzice
- First mentioned: 1566

Government
  - Mayor: Marian Derlich

Area
  - Total: 6.0 km^{2} (2.3 sq mi)

Population (2011)
  - Total: 1,063
  - Density: 180/km^{2} (460/sq mi)
- Time zone: UTC+1 (CET)
  - Summer (DST): UTC+2 (CEST)
- Postal code: 43-502
- Car plates: SBI

Bronów is a village in Gmina Czechowice-Dziedzice, Bielsko County, Silesian Voivodeship, southern Poland. The village lies on the edge of the historical region of Cieszyn Silesia.

The name of the village is derived from German personal name Bruno.

== History ==
It was first mentioned in a written document in 1566 as Braune. Politically the village belonged then to the Duchy of Teschen, a fee of the Kingdom of Bohemia, which after 1526 became part of the Habsburg monarchy. In 1572, it was sold together with Bielsko and a dozen surrounding villages by dukes of Cieszyn and split from their duchy to form Bielsko state country (since 1754 Duchy of Bielsko).

After Revolutions of 1848 in the Austrian Empire a modern municipal division was introduced in the re-established Austrian Silesia. The village as a municipality was subscribed to the political and legal district of Bielsko. According to the censuses conducted in 1880, 1890, 1900 and 1910, the population of the municipality grew from 731 in 1880 to 749 in 1910 with a majority being native Polish-speakers (98.1%–100%) accompanied by a small German-speaking minority (at most 14 or 1.9% in 1880), in terms of religion in 1910 majority were Roman Catholics (92.9%), followed by Protestants (6.4%) and Jews (5 people).

After World War I, the fall of Austria-Hungary, Polish–Czechoslovak War and the division of Cieszyn Silesia in 1920, it became a part of Poland. It was then annexed by Nazi Germany at the beginning of World War II but after the war, it was restored to Poland.

== Landmarks ==
In 1874–1877, the Sacred Heart of Jesus Church was constructed in Bronów. There is also a chapel from 1831 in the village.
