= Ligotka =

Ligotka may refer to the following places in Poland:

- Ligotka, Lower Silesian Voivodeship (south-west Poland)
- Ligotka, Opole Voivodeship (south-west Poland)
