= Ostrožská Lhota =

- Municipality
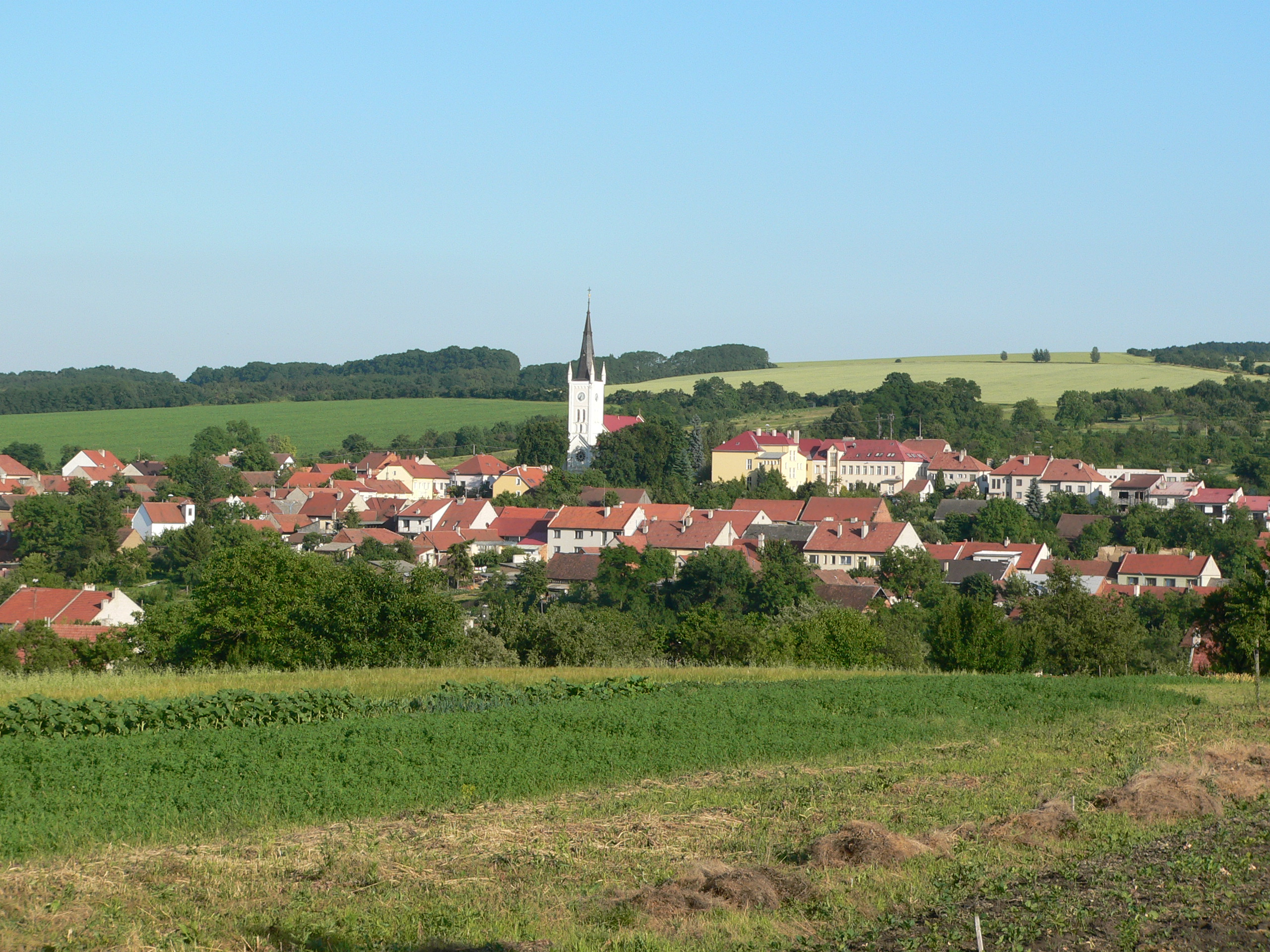
- View from the north

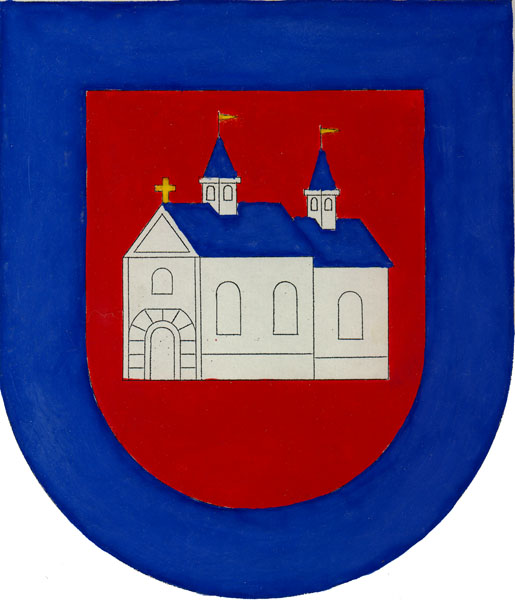
- Flag Coat of arms

- Location in the Czech Republic
- Coordinates: 48°58′32″N 17°28′3″E
- Country: Czech Republic
- Region: Zlín
- District: Uherské Hradiště
- First mentioned: 1371

Area
  - Total: 6.35 km^{2} (2.45 sq mi)
- Elevation: 207 m (679 ft)

Population (2026-01-01)
  - Total: 1,489
  - Density: 234/km^{2} (607/sq mi)
- Time zone: UTC+1 (CET)
  - Summer (DST): UTC+2 (CEST)
- Postal code: 687 23
- Website: www.ostrozskalhota.cz

Ostrožská Lhota (Czech pronunciation: [ˈostroʃskaː ˈlɦota]) is a municipality and village in Uherské Hradiště District in the Zlín Region of the Czech Republic. It has about 1,500 inhabitants.

== Geography ==
Ostrožská Lhota is located about 10 kilometres (6 mi) south of Uherské Hradiště and 30 km (19 mi) southwest of Zlín. It lies in an agricultural landscape in the Vizovice Highlands. The highest point is at 356 m (1,168 ft) above sea level. The village is situated in the valley of the Okluky Stream.

== History ==
The village was founded during the colonisation in the 13th or early 14th century, which indicated its name "Lhota". The first written mention of Ostrožská Lhota is in a deed of Moravian Margrave John Henry from 1371. At that time, the village was called Majori Lhota (Latin for 'great Lhota'). Other old documented names are Velká Lhota, Ostrovská Lhota and Ostrá Lhota.

In 1511, Jan of Kunovice bought the estate. His family held it until the Thirty Years' War.

== Demographics ==
Historical population

Year	Pop.	±%
1869	921	—
1880	1,072	+16.4%
1890	1,192	+11.2%
1900	1,233	+3.4%
1910	1,437	+16.5%

Year	Pop.	±%
1921	1,481	+3.1%
1930	1,379	−6.9%
1950	1,515	+9.9%
1961	1,733	+14.4%
1970	1,763	+1.7%

Year	Pop.	±%
1980	1,741	−1.2%
1991	1,658	−4.8%
2001	1,635	−1.4%
2011	1,495	−8.6%
2021	1,359	−9.1%

Source: Censuses

== Economy ==
In 2007, a photovoltaic power station was installed in Ostrožská Lhota, which in the time of its inauguration was the largest power station of this kind in Central Europe, reaching an output of 702 kWp.

== Transport ==
There are no railways or major roads passing through the municipality.

== Sights ==
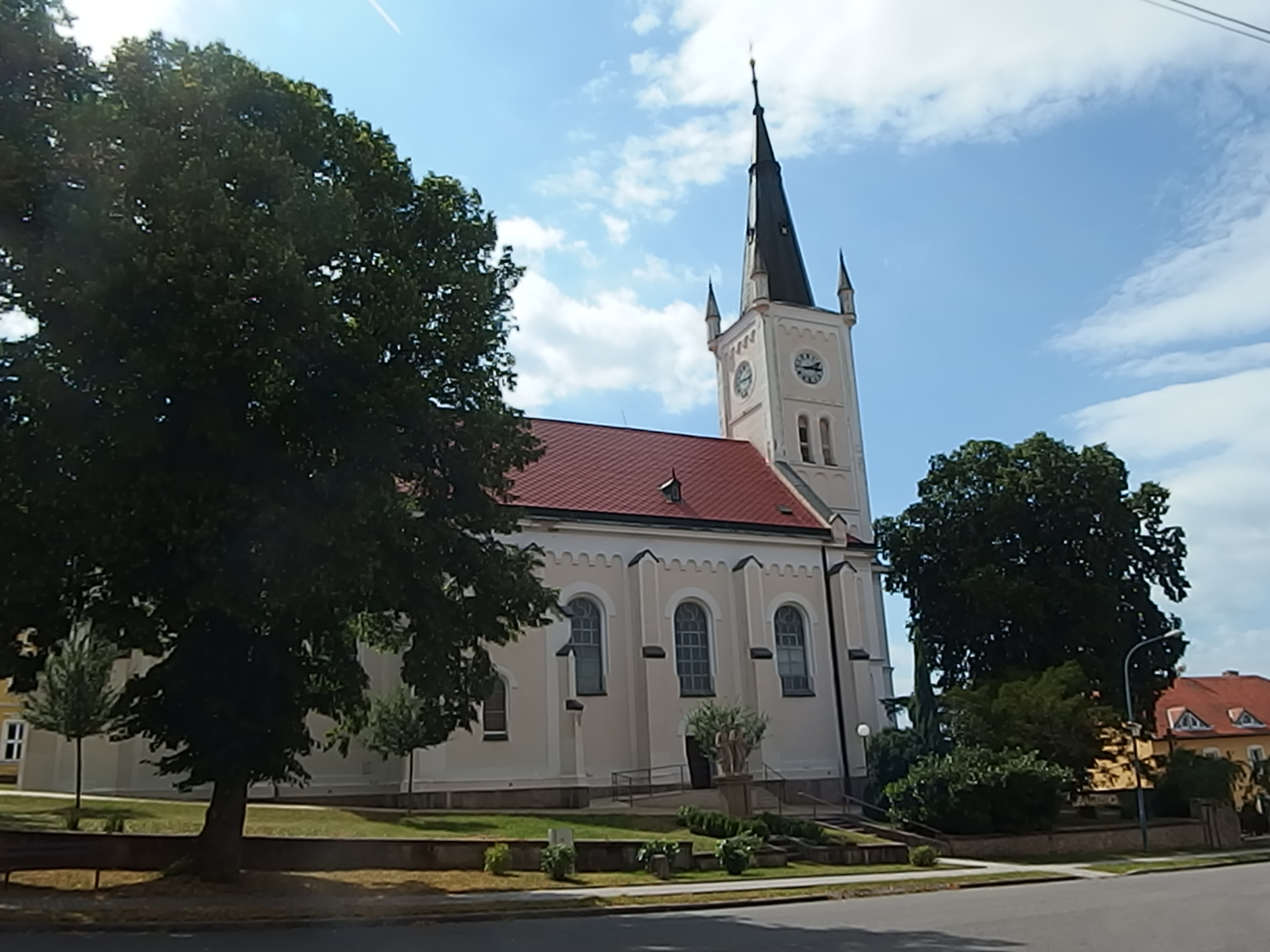
Church of Saint James the Great

The main landmark of Ostrožská Lhota is the Church of Saint James the Great. The current church was built in the late Baroque style in 1908, on the site of a demolished church building from 1832. Its tower originated from the oldest known church, collapsed in 1830.

A cultural monument is the statue of St. John the Baptist, which dates from 1747.
