= Krvavé Šenky =

Coordinates: 48°20′20″N 17°59′11″E

Krvavé Šenky, literally "Bloody Inns", is a settlement of Lehota municipality, Slovakia. It is located on the road from Nitra to Hlohovec and with the municipality is connected with a dirt road.

== History ==
The settlement is connected to the settlement, first mentioned in 1772, but also murders, supernatural phenomenas or bank robbery from 1996 and many car accidents. The name of the settlement was changed after the bloody story which took place around 1848.

In 20th century, the settlement was owned by several owners. Due to the poor economic situation of the settlement, except two people all the inhabitants gone away.

== Mud ==
At a depth of five to ten meters, there is soil in Krvavé Šenky reminiscent of lime, sediment and glei with preservative effects.
