= Svatý Jiří =

- Municipality
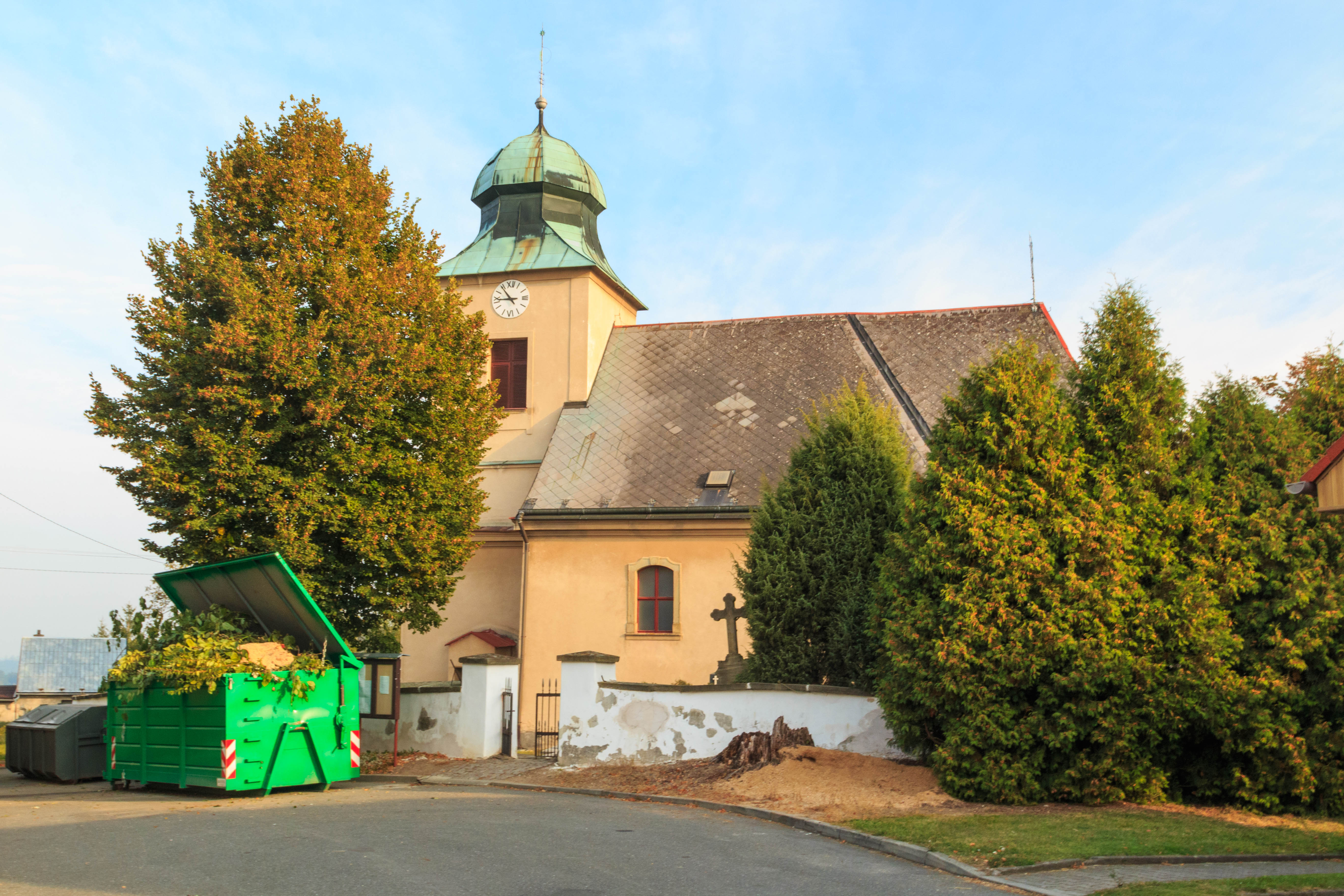
- Church of Saint George

- Flag Coat of arms

- Location in the Czech Republic
- Coordinates: 49°58′19″N 16°16′13″E
- Country: Czech Republic
- Region: Pardubice
- District: Ústí nad Orlicí
- First mentioned: 1199

Area
  - Total: 4.38 km^{2} (1.69 sq mi)
- Elevation: 394 m (1,293 ft)

Population (2026-01-01)
  - Total: 290
  - Density: 66/km^{2} (170/sq mi)
- Time zone: UTC+1 (CET)
  - Summer (DST): UTC+2 (CEST)
- Postal code: 565 01
- Website: www.svaty-jiri.cz

Svatý Jiří is a municipality and village in Ústí nad Orlicí District in the Pardubice Region of the Czech Republic. It has about 300 inhabitants.

Svatý Jiří lies approximately 9 kilometres (6 mi) west of Ústí nad Orlicí, 37 km (23 mi) east of Pardubice, and 134 km (83 mi) east of Prague.

== Administrative division ==
Svatý Jiří consists of three municipal parts (in brackets population according to the 2021 census):

- Svatý Jiří (187)
- Loučky (72)
- Sítiny (13)

== Etymology ==
The name means 'Saint George' in Czech.

== Demographics ==
Historical population
Year	Pop.	±%
1869	413	—
1880	445	+7.7%
1890	416	−6.5%
1900	416	+0.0%
1910	428	+2.9%
1921	394	−7.9%
1930	359	−8.9%
1950	315	−12.3%
1961	300	−4.8%
1970	275	−8.3%
1980	315	+14.5%
1991	292	−7.3%
2001	300	+2.7%
2011	295	−1.7%
2021	272	−7.8%
Source: Censuses
