= Sloboda =

Former type of settlement in East Slavic Eastern Europe

Map showing slobodas in Russia

A sloboda (Note: Russian: слобода, IPA: [sləbɐˈda]; Ukrainian: слобода, IPA: [sloboˈdɑ]; Belarusian: слабада, romanized: slabada.) was a type of settlement in the history of Belarus, Russia and Ukraine. The name is derived from the early Slavic word for 'freedom' and may be loosely translated as 'free settlement'.

== History ==
In the history of Russia, a sloboda was a settlement or a town district of people free of the power of boyars. Often these were settlements of tradesmen and artisans, and were named according to their trade, such as the yamshchiks' sloboda (Russian: ямская слобода, yamskaya sloboda) and smiths' sloboda. The German Quarter (nemetskaya sloboda) in Moscow was set up to house foreigners.

Often a sloboda was a colonization-type settlement in sparsely populated lands, particularly by Cossacks in the Cossack Hetmanate, see "Sloboda Ukraine". Initially, the settlers of such sloboda were freed from various taxes and levies for various reasons, hence the name. Freedom from taxes was an incentive for colonization.

By the first half of the 18th century, this privilege was abolished, and slobodas became ordinary villages, shtetls, townlets, or suburbs.

Some slobodas were suburban settlements, right behind the city wall. Many of them were subsequently incorporated into cities, and the corresponding toponyms indicate their origin.

The Brockhaus and Efron Encyclopedic Dictionary relates that by the end of the 19th century a sloboda was a large village with more than one church, a marketplace, and volost administration, or a village-type settlement of industrial character, where the peasants had little involvement in agriculture.

The term is preserved in the names of various settlements and city quarters. Some settlements were named simply Sloboda, Slobodka (diminutive form), Slabodka, or Slobidka (Ukrainian).

Similar settlements existed in Wallachia and Moldavia, called slobozie or slobozia. The latter term is also the name of the capital city of Ialomița County, Slobozia, in modern Romania.

== See also ==
- Wola, a similar concept in Polish history
- Lhota, a similar concept in Czech history
- Royal free city
