= Zabrzeg =

- Village
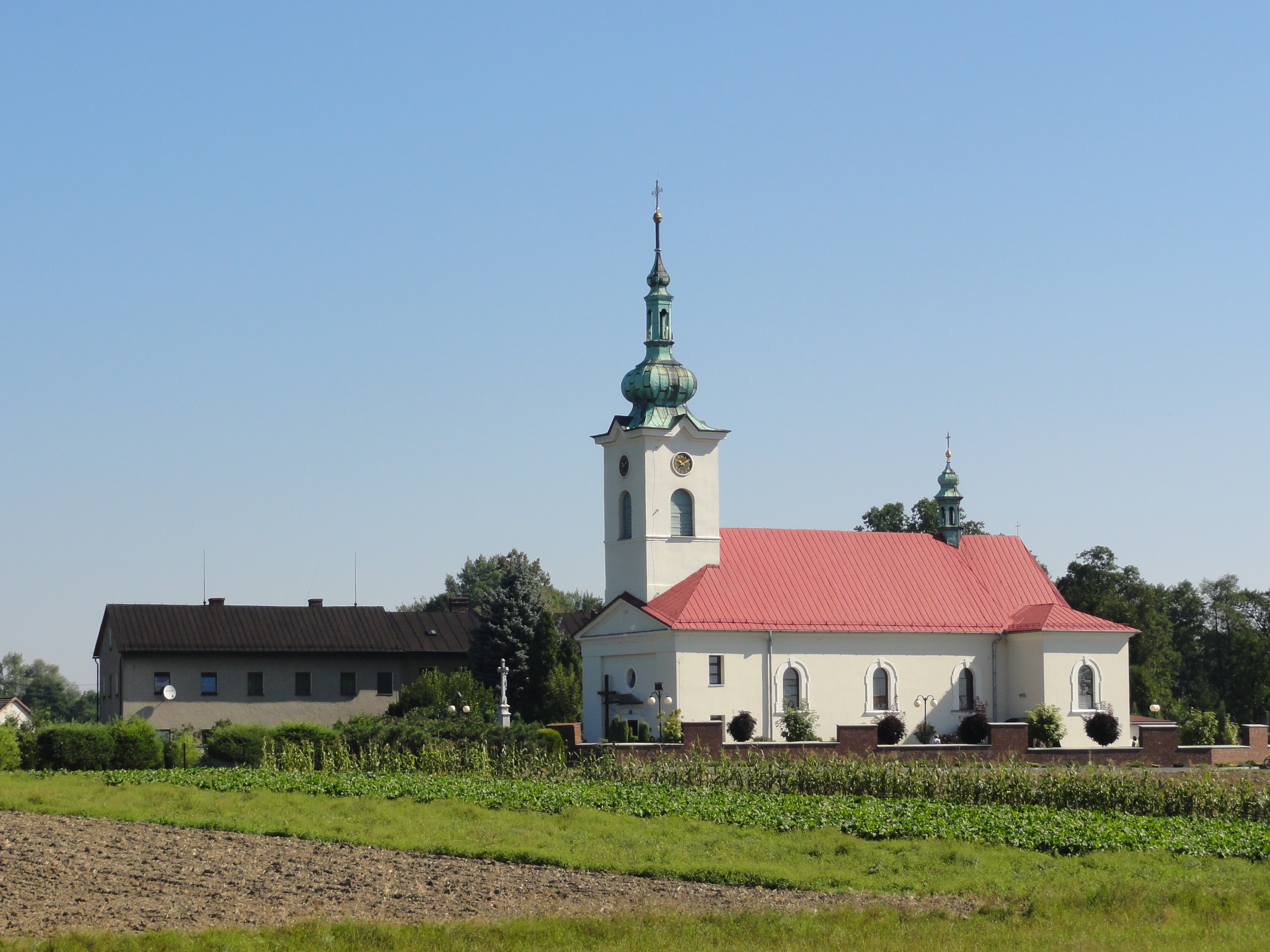
- Church of Saint Joseph

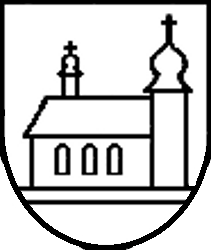
- Coat of arms

- Location within Poland
- Coordinates: 49°54′52″N 18°56′44″E
- Country: Poland
- Voivodeship: Silesian
- County: Bielsko
- Gmina: Czechowice-Dziedzice
- First mentioned: 1525

Government
  - Mayor: Andrzej Puskarczyk

Area
  - Total: 14.0 km^{2} (5.4 sq mi)

Population (2008)
  - Total: 3,107
  - Density: 222/km^{2} (575/sq mi)
- Time zone: UTC+1 (CET)
  - Summer (DST): UTC+2 (CEST)
- Postal code: 43-516
- Car plates: SBI

Zabrzeg is a village in Gmina Czechowice-Dziedzice, Bielsko County, Silesian Voivodeship, southern Poland.

The name is of topographic origin and is a composition of two words: za (behind) and brzeg (coast or bank of the river). The village lies on the right bank of the Vistula river, on the edge of the historical region of Cieszyn Silesia.

== History ==
The village was probably settled in the 14th century, but was first mentioned in a written document in 1525 as Zabrzech. (Note: Others sources state that it was first mentioned in the document issued on 21 February 1517 among villages of Pless circle being then sold, however it could not be Zabrzeg in the Duchy of Teschen.) Politically the village belonged then to the Duchy of Teschen, a fee of the Kingdom of Bohemia, which after 1526 became part of the Habsburg monarchy.

After Revolutions of 1848 in the Austrian Empire a modern municipal division was introduced in the re-established Austrian Silesia. The village as a municipality was subscribed to the political and legal district of Bielsko. According to the censuses conducted in 1880, 1890, 1900 and 1910 the population of the municipality grew from 1277 in 1880 to 1598 in 1910 with a majority being native Polish-speakers (between 96.1% in 1880 and 97.2% in 1910) accompanied by a small German-speaking minority (at most 3.4% in 1880) and Czech-speaking (at most 20 or 1.5% in 1900). In terms of religion in 1910 majority were Roman Catholics (98%), followed by Jews (30 or 1.9%) and 2 Protestants.

After World War I, fall of Austria-Hungary, Polish–Czechoslovak War and the division of Cieszyn Silesia in 1920, it became a part of Poland. It was then annexed by Nazi Germany at the beginning of World War II. On the 27 May 1942 German soldiers executed by hanging 5 Polish civilians: Stefan Górecki, Alojzy Jarczok, Wilhelm Herok, Adolf and Jan Grygierczyk. Zabrzeg was taken over by the Red Army on 9 February 1945 after heavy fighting with Wehrmacht. After the war it was restored to Poland.

== Landmarks ==
There are several landmarks in Zabrzeg, including the Saint Joseph parish church from the 18th century and the statue of Priest Józef Londzin.
