= Vlachova Lhota =

- Municipality
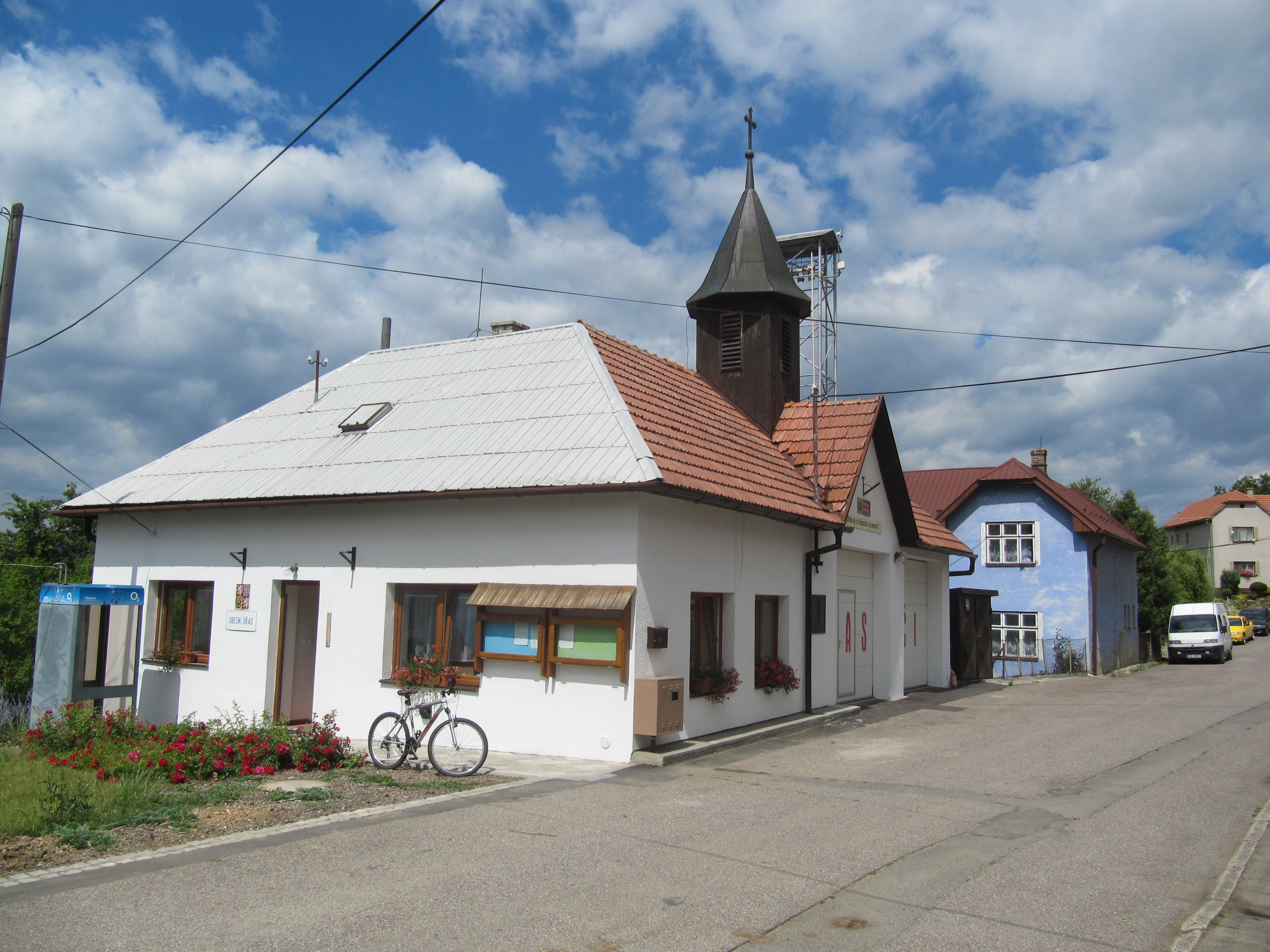
- Municipal office

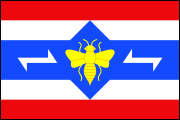
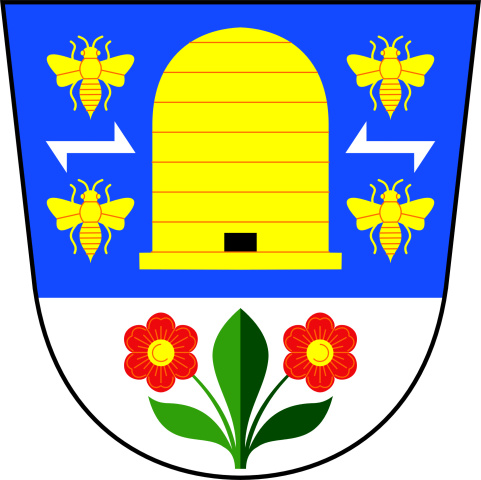
- Flag Coat of arms

- Location in the Czech Republic
- Coordinates: 49°9′0″N 17°57′12″E
- Country: Czech Republic
- Region: Zlín
- District: Zlín
- First mentioned: 1412

Area
  - Total: 3.83 km^{2} (1.48 sq mi)
- Elevation: 452 m (1,483 ft)

Population (2026-01-01)
  - Total: 206
  - Density: 53.8/km^{2} (139/sq mi)
- Time zone: UTC+1 (CET)
  - Summer (DST): UTC+2 (CEST)
- Postal code: 766 01
- Website: www.vlachova-lhota.cz

Vlachova Lhota is a municipality and village in Zlín District in the Zlín Region of the Czech Republic. It has about 200 inhabitants.

Vlachova Lhota lies approximately 23 kilometres (14 mi) south-east of Zlín and 276 km (171 mi) east of Prague.

== Demographics ==
Historical population
| Year | Pop. | ±% |
|---|---|---|
| 1869 | 287 | — |
| 1880 | 329 | +14.6% |
| 1890 | 317 | −3.6% |
| 1900 | 323 | +1.9% |
| 1910 | 344 | +6.5% |
| 1921 | 346 | +0.6% |
| 1930 | 333 | −3.8% |
| 1950 | 336 | +0.9% |
| 1961 | 355 | +5.7% |
| 1970 | 353 | −0.6% |
| 1980 | 310 | −12.2% |
| 1991 | 264 | −14.8% |
| 2001 | 242 | −8.3% |
| 2011 | 225 | −7.0% |
| 2021 | 200 | −11.1% |
Source: Censuses
