= Ligotka, Opole Voivodeship =

Ligotka
- Village
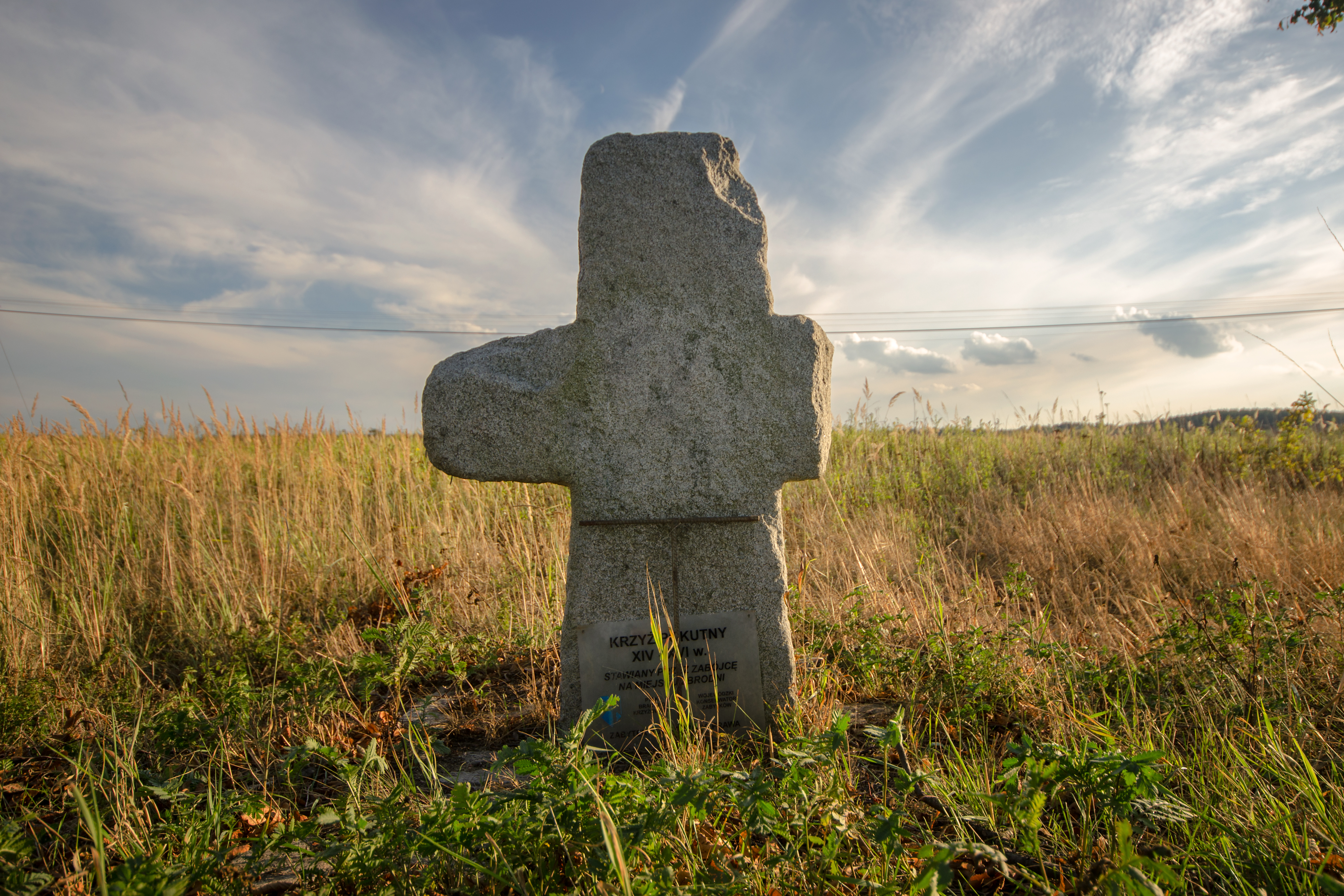

- Location within Poland
- Coordinates: 51°04′49″N 17°40′13″E
- Country: Poland
- Voivodeship: Opole
- County: Namysłów
- Gmina: Namysłów

Ligotka [liˈɡɔtka] (German Ellguth) is a village in the administrative district of Gmina Namysłów, within Namysłów County, Opole Voivodeship, in south-western Poland.
