= Lehota =

Village and municipality in Slovakia

Lehota Abaszállás
- Municipality
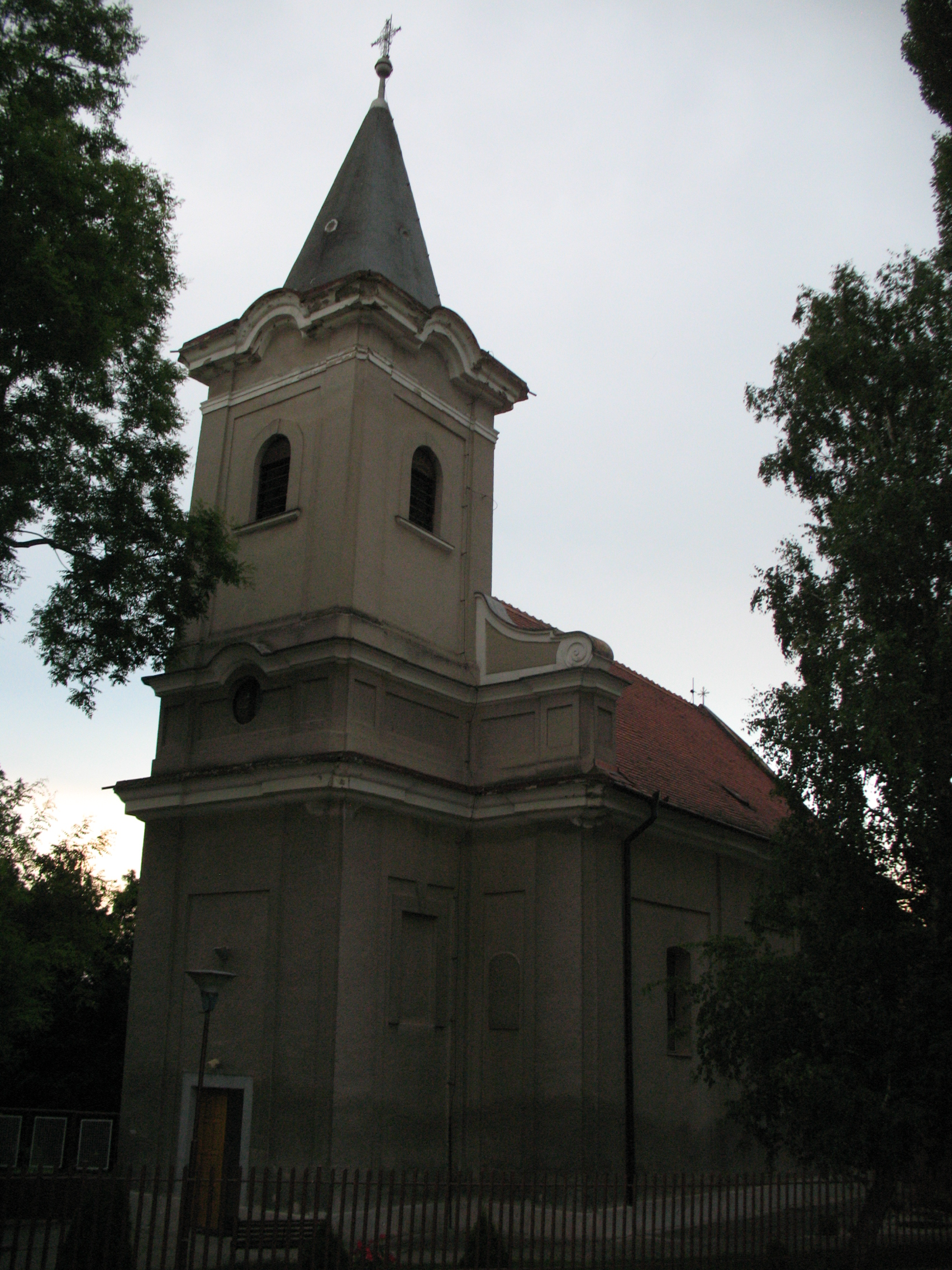

- Flag

- Location of Lehota in the Nitra Region Location of Lehota in Slovakia
- Coordinates: 48.32°N 18.00°E
- Country: Slovakia
- Region: Nitra Region
- District: Nitra District
- First mentioned: 1308

Area
  - Total: 11.00 km^{2} (4.25 sq mi)
- Elevation: 174 m (571 ft)

Population (2025)
  - Total: 2,424
- Time zone: UTC+1 (CET)
  - Summer (DST): UTC+2 (CEST)
- Postal code: 951 36
- Area code: +421 37
- Vehicle registration plate (until 2022): NR
- Website: www.lehota.sk

Lehota (Hungarian: Abaszállás) is a village and municipality in the Nitra District in western central Slovakia, in the Nitra Region.

== History ==
In historical records the village was first mentioned in 1308. Before the establishment of independent Czechoslovakia in 1918, Lehota was part of Nyitra County within the Kingdom of Hungary. From 1939 to 1945, it was part of the Slovak Republic.

== Geography ==
The municipality lies at an altitude of 174 metres (571 ft) and covers an area of 11.00 km^{2} (4.25 sq mi) (2025).

== Population ==
Population statistic (10 years)
Year	1995	2005	2015	2025
Count	1796	1825	2235	2424
Difference		+1.61%	+22.46%	+8.45%

Population statistic
Year	2024	2025
Count	2428	2424
Difference		−0.16%

It has a population of 2424 people (31 December 2025).

=== Ethnicity ===
Census 2021 (1+ %)
Ethnicity	Number	Fraction
Slovak	2253	94.58%
Not found out	110	4.61%
Total	2382	

In year 2021 was 2382 people by ethnicity 2253 as Slovak, 110 as Not found out, 19 as Other, 13 as Hungarian, 9 as Czech, 7 as Russian, 3 as Vietnamese, 3 as Italian, 3 as Polish, 2 as German, 1 as Ukrainian and 1 as Rusyn.

Note on population: The difference values of population numbers in the table "Population statistic" and in the sections "Ethnicity" & "Religion" is caused by the use of various statistical methods.

=== Religion ===
Census 2021 (1+ %)
Religion	Number	Fraction
Roman Catholic Church	1668	70.03%
None	508	21.33%
Not found out	109	4.58%
Total	2382	

In year 2021 was 2382 people by religion 1668 from Roman Catholic Church, 508 from None, 109 from Not found out, 17 from Evangelical Church, 16 from Greek Catholic Church, 13 from Other, 12 from Ad hoc movements, 10 from Buddhism, 8 from Christian Congregations in Slovakia, 6 from Old Catholic Church, 3 from Eastern Orthodox Church, 3 from Paganism and natural spirituality, 3 from Seventh-day Adventist Church, 2 from Other and not ascertained christian church, 1 from Calvinist Church, 1 from Jehovah's Witnesses, 1 from United Methodist Church and 1 from Baptists Church.

== Facilities ==
The village has a public library and football pitch. It also has a multifunctional playground.

== See also ==
- Krvavé Šenky
