= Lgota, Chrzanów County =

Lgota
- Village
- Location within Poland
- Coordinates: 50°12′27″N 19°33′23″E
- Country: Poland
- Voivodeship: Lesser Poland
- County: Chrzanów
- Gmina: Trzebinia

Lgota [ˈlɡɔta] is a village in the administrative district of Gmina Trzebinia, within Chrzanów County, Lesser Poland Voivodeship, in southern Poland. The village is located in the historical region Galicia.
