= Březina (former Blansko District) =

- Municipality
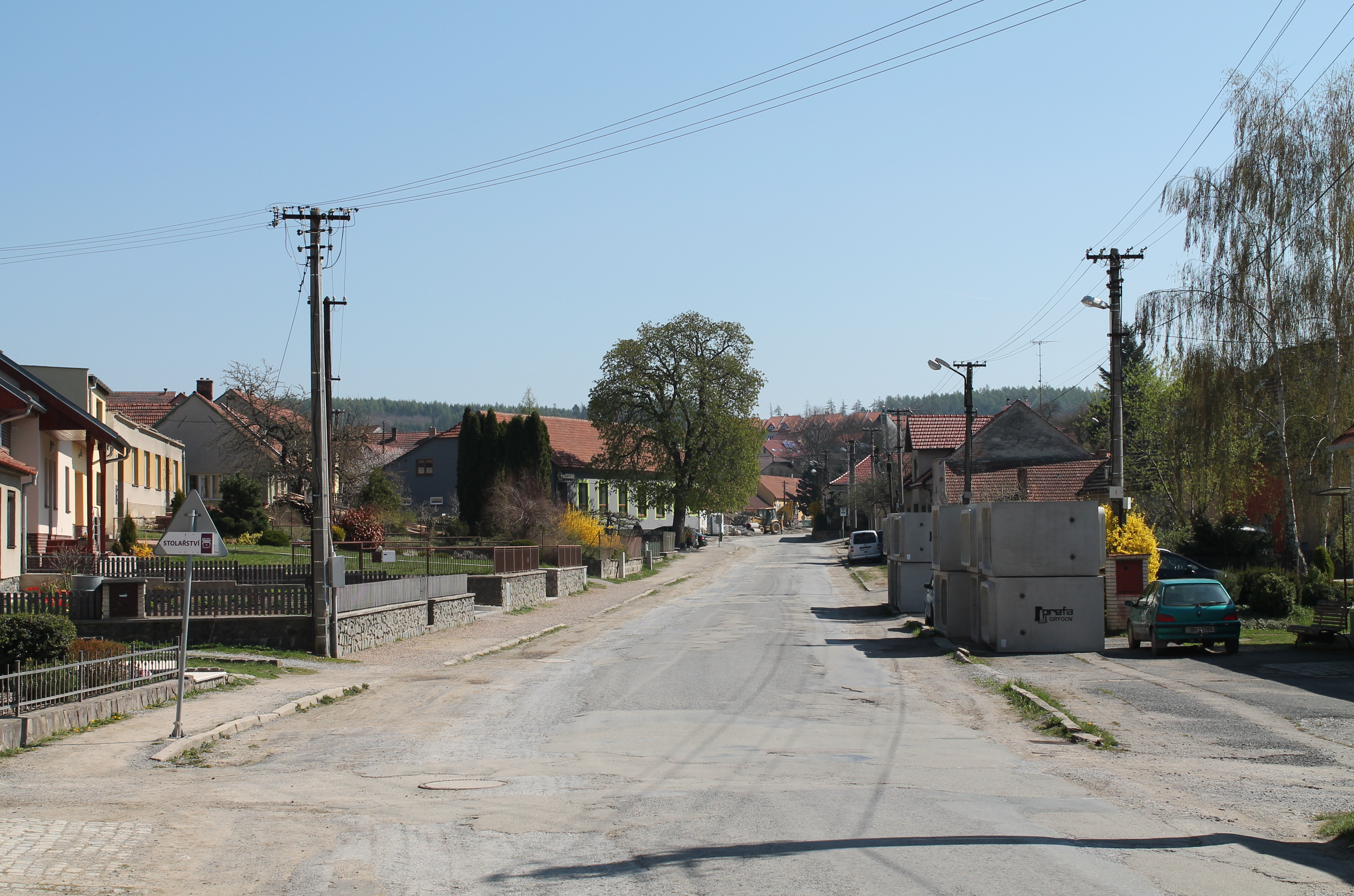
- Centre of Březina

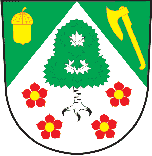
- Flag Coat of arms

- Location in the Czech Republic
- Coordinates: 49°16′54″N 16°44′58″E
- Country: Czech Republic
- Region: South Moravian
- District: Brno-Country
- First mentioned: 1365

Area
  - Total: 6.83 km^{2} (2.64 sq mi)
- Elevation: 440 m (1,440 ft)

Population (2026-01-01)
  - Total: 1,158
  - Density: 170/km^{2} (439/sq mi)
- Time zone: UTC+1 (CET)
  - Summer (DST): UTC+2 (CEST)
- Postal code: 679 05
- Website: www.obec-brezina.cz

Březina is a municipality and village in Brno-Country District in the South Moravian Region of the Czech Republic. It has about 1,200 inhabitants.

Březina lies approximately 13 kilometres (8 mi) north-east of Brno and 192 km (119 mi) south-east of Prague.

== History ==
The first written mention of Březina is from 1365. The village of Proseč was first mentioned in 1395. In 1950, both villages were merged into one municipality. Since 1 January 2007, Březina has been no longer part of Blansko District and became part of Brno-Country District.

== Demographics ==
Historical population
| Year | Pop. | ±% |
|---|---|---|
| 1869 | 560 | — |
| 1880 | 623 | +11.3% |
| 1890 | 639 | +2.6% |
| 1900 | 650 | +1.7% |
| 1910 | 720 | +10.8% |
| 1921 | 672 | −6.7% |
| 1930 | 675 | +0.4% |
| 1950 | 623 | −7.7% |
| 1961 | 684 | +9.8% |
| 1970 | 707 | +3.4% |
| 1980 | 693 | −2.0% |
| 1991 | 628 | −9.4% |
| 2001 | 593 | −5.6% |
| 2011 | 812 | +36.9% |
| 2021 | 1,098 | +35.2% |
Source: Censuses

== Twin towns – sister cities ==
Březina is twinned with:

- Valaská Dubová, Slovakia
