= Liptovská Teplá =

- Municipality
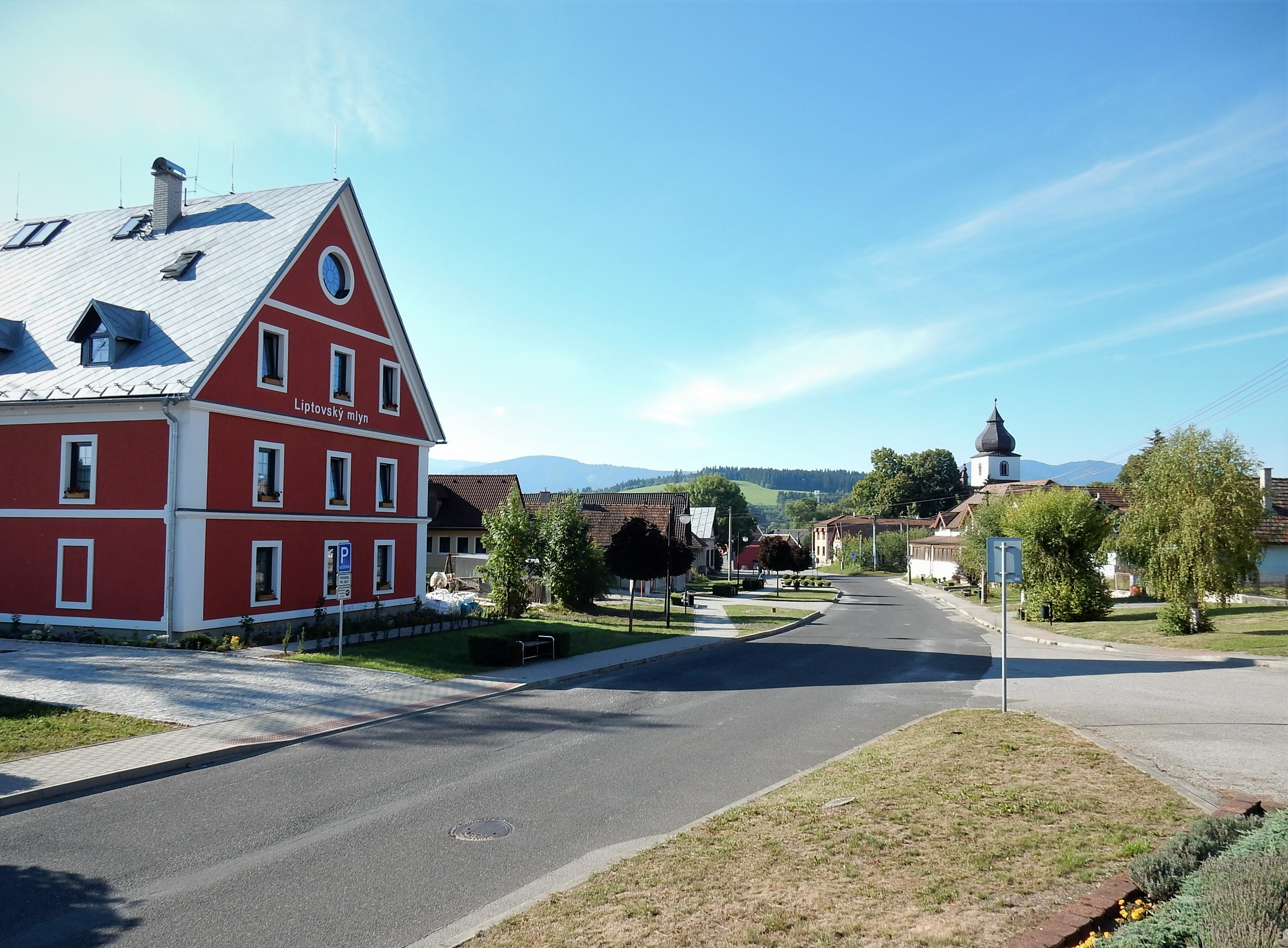

- Flag

- Location of Liptovská Teplá in the Žilina Region Location of Liptovská Teplá in Slovakia
- Coordinates: 49.10°N 19.42°E
- Country: Slovakia
- Region: Žilina Region
- District: Ružomberok District
- First mentioned: 1264

Area
  - Total: 9.43 km^{2} (3.64 sq mi)
- Elevation: 517 m (1,696 ft)

Population (2025)
  - Total: 1,020
- Time zone: UTC+1 (CET)
  - Summer (DST): UTC+2 (CEST)
- Postal code: 348 3
- Area code: +421 44
- Vehicle registration plate (until 2022): RK
- Website: www.liptovskatepla.sk

Liptovská Teplá (Hungarian: Liptótepla) is a village and municipality in Ružomberok District in the Žilina Region of northern Slovakia.

== History ==
In historical records the village was first mentioned in 1264.

== Geography ==
The municipality lies at an altitude of 517 metres (1,696 ft) and covers an area of 9.43 km^{2} (3.64 sq mi) (2025).

== Population ==
Population statistic (10 years)
Year	1995	2005	2015	2025
Count	875	914	1001	1020
Difference		+4.45%	+9.51%	+1.89%

Population statistic
Year	2024	2025
Count	1018	1020
Difference		+0.19%

It has a population of 1020 people (31 December 2025).

=== Ethnicity ===
Census 2021 (1+ %)
Ethnicity	Number	Fraction
Slovak	1010	97.96%
Not found out	25	2.42%
Total	1031	

In year 2021 was 1031 people by ethnicity 1010 as Slovak, 25 as Not found out, 4 as Other, 3 as Czech, 2 as Hungarian, 2 as French, 1 as Rusyn, 1 as Austrian, 1 as Polish and 1 as German.

Note on population: The difference values of population numbers in the table "Population statistic" and in the sections "Ethnicity" & "Religion" is caused by the use of various statistical methods.

=== Religion ===
Census 2021 (1+ %)
Religion	Number	Fraction
Roman Catholic Church	749	72.65%
None	157	15.23%
Evangelical Church	62	6.01%
Not found out	27	2.62%
Greek Catholic Church	15	1.45%
Total	1031	

In year 2021 was 1031 people by religion 749 from Roman Catholic Church, 157 from None, 62 from Evangelical Church, 27 from Not found out, 15 from Greek Catholic Church, 7 from Other, 4 from Eastern Orthodox Church, 3 from Other and not ascertained christian church, 2 from Christian Congregations in Slovakia, 2 from Baptists Church, 1 from Calvinist Church, 1 from Paganism and natural spirituality and 1 from Ad hoc movements.
