= Komjatná =

- Municipality
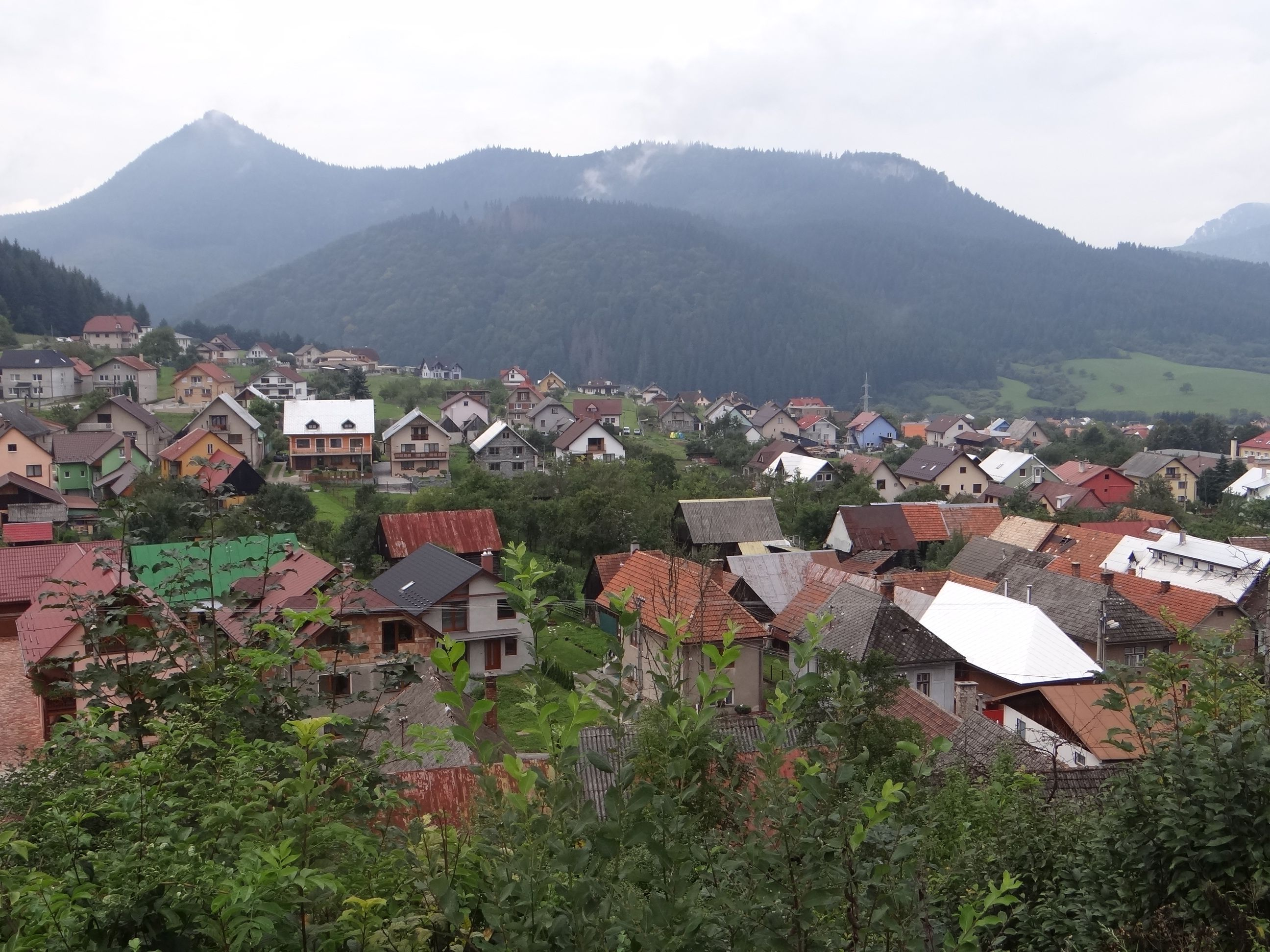

- Flag

- Location of Komjatná in the Žilina Region Location of Komjatná in Slovakia
- Coordinates: 49.15°N 19.25°E
- Country: Slovakia
- Region: Žilina Region
- District: Ružomberok District
- First mentioned: 1330

Area
  - Total: 14.54 km^{2} (5.61 sq mi)
- Elevation: 679 m (2,228 ft)

Population (2025)
  - Total: 1,563
- Time zone: UTC+1 (CET)
  - Summer (DST): UTC+2 (CEST)
- Postal code: 349 6
- Area code: +421 44
- Vehicle registration plate (until 2022): RK
- Website: www.komjatna.sk

Komjatná is a village and municipality in Ružomberok District in the Žilina Region of northern Slovakia.

== Etymology ==
Komňatná → Komjatná. "Something that has a relationship to the chamber" (Slovak komnata: a chamber), "the village with guest chambers".

== History ==
In historical records the village was first mentioned in 1330 (Komnathna).

== Geography ==
The municipality lies at an altitude of 679 metres (2,228 ft) and covers an area of 14.54 km^{2} (5.61 sq mi) (2025).

== Population ==
Population statistic (10 years)
Year	1995	2005	2015	2025
Count	1397	1468	1517	1563
Difference		+5.08%	+3.33%	+3.03%

Population statistic
Year	2024	2025
Count	1574	1563
Difference		−0.69%

It has a population of 1563 people (31 December 2025).

=== Ethnicity ===
Census 2021 (1+ %)
Ethnicity	Number	Fraction
Slovak	1558	98.85%
Not found out	24	1.52%
Total	1576	

In year 2021 was 1576 people by ethnicity 1558 as Slovak, 24 as Not found out, 6 as Czech, 2 as Other, 1 as German and 1 as Hungarian.

Note on population: The difference values of population numbers in the table "Population statistic" and in the sections "Ethnicity" & "Religion" is caused by the use of various statistical methods.

=== Religion ===
Census 2021 (1+ %)
Religion	Number	Fraction
Roman Catholic Church	1487	94.35%
None	52	3.3%
Not found out	20	1.27%
Total	1576	

In year 2021 was 1576 people by religion 1487 from Roman Catholic Church, 52 from None, 20 from Not found out, 6 from Evangelical Church, 3 from Ad hoc movements, 2 from Buddhism, 1 from Calvinist Church, 1 from Paganism and natural spirituality, 1 from Christian Congregations in Slovakia, 1 from Greek Catholic Church, 1 from Seventh-day Adventist Church and 1 from Baptists Church.

== Genealogical resources ==
The records for genealogical research are available at the state archive "Statny Archiv in Bytca, Slovakia"

- Roman Catholic church records (births/marriages/deaths): 1710-1900 (parish A)

== See also ==
- List of municipalities and towns in Slovakia
