= Liptovské Revúce =

- Municipality
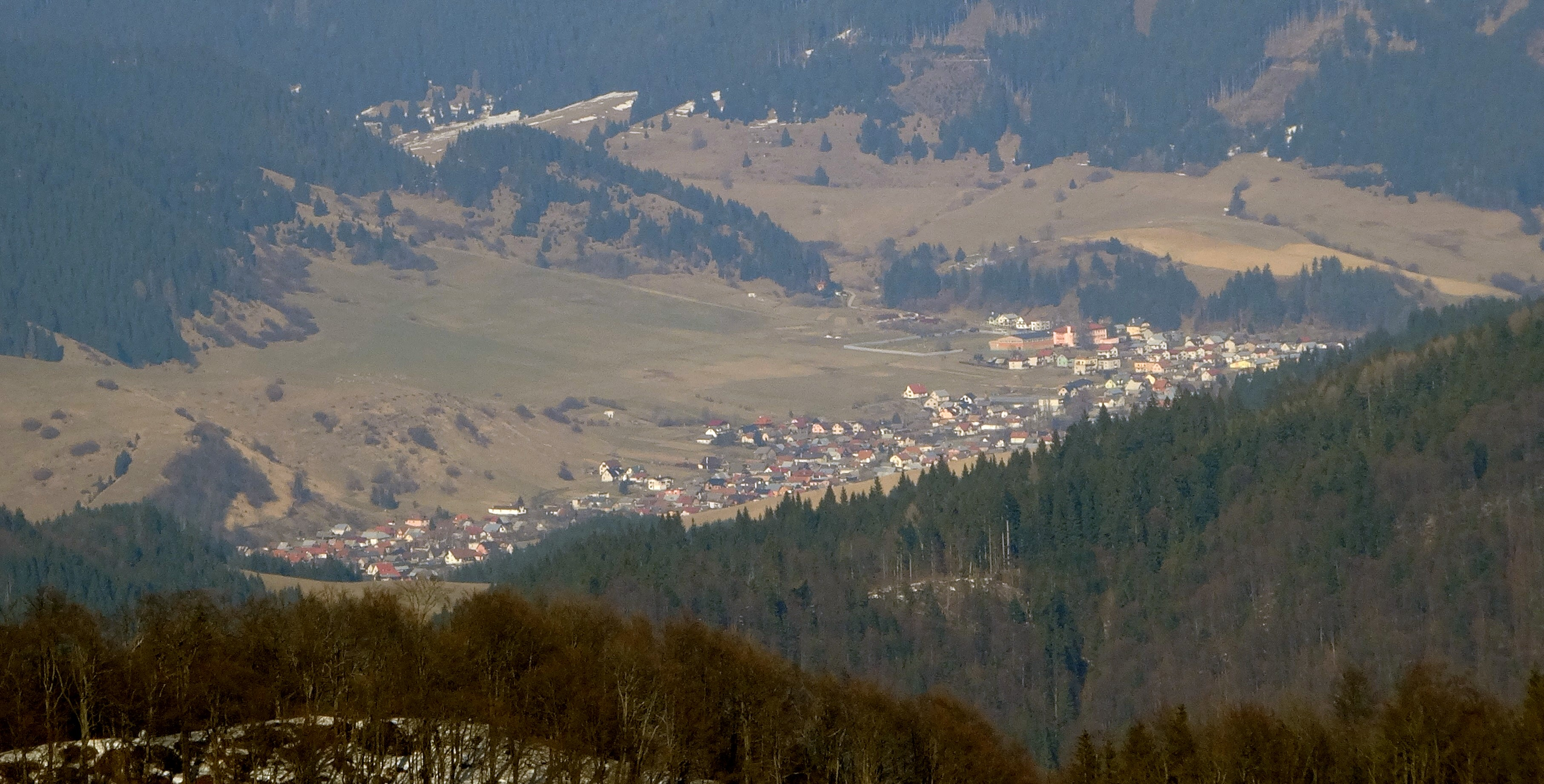

- Flag

- Location of Liptovské Revúce in the Žilina Region Location of Liptovské Revúce in Slovakia
- Coordinates: 48.93°N 19.20°E
- Country: Slovakia
- Region: Žilina Region
- District: Ružomberok District
- First mentioned: 1233

Area
  - Total: 76.91 km^{2} (29.70 sq mi)
- Elevation: 684 m (2,244 ft)

Population (2025)
  - Total: 1,424
- Time zone: UTC+1 (CET)
  - Summer (DST): UTC+2 (CEST)
- Postal code: 347 4
- Area code: +421 44
- Vehicle registration plate (until 2022): RK
- Website: www.liptovskerevuce.sk

Liptovské Revúce (Hungarian: Háromrevuca) is a large village and municipality in Ružomberok District in the Žilina Region of northern Slovakia. It borders Martin District, Dolný Kubín District & Liptovsky Mikuláš District.

== History ==
In historical records the village was first mentioned in 1233.

== Geography ==
The municipality lies at an altitude of 684 metres (2,244 ft) and covers an area of 76.91 km^{2} (29.70 sq mi) (2025).

== Population ==
Population statistic (10 years)
Year	1995	2005	2015	2025
Count	1769	1667	1569	1424
Difference		−5.76%	−5.87%	−9.24%

Population statistic
Year	2024	2025
Count	1442	1424
Difference		−1.24%

It has a population of 1424 people (31 December 2025).

=== Ethnicity ===
Census 2021 (1+ %)
Ethnicity	Number	Fraction
Slovak	1515	98.63%
Total	1536	

In year 2021 was 1536 people by ethnicity 1515 as Slovak, 14 as Not found out, 6 as Hungarian, 5 as Czech, 3 as Russian, 2 as Irish, 2 as Polish, 1 as Ukrainian, 1 as Italian, 1 as Romani and 1 as Other.

Note on population: The difference values of population numbers in the table "Population statistic" and in the sections "Ethnicity" & "Religion" is caused by the use of various statistical methods.

=== Religion ===
Census 2021 (1+ %)
Religion	Number	Fraction
Roman Catholic Church	1352	88.02%
None	123	8.01%
Total	1536	

In year 2021 was 1536 people by religion 1352 from Roman Catholic Church, 123 from None, 14 from Greek Catholic Church, 11 from Not found out, 8 from Jehovah's Witnesses, 8 from Christian Congregations in Slovakia, 8 from Evangelical Church, 4 from Other, 3 from Paganism and natural spirituality, 3 from Ad hoc movements, 1 from Jewish community and 1 from Buddhism.
