= Stankovany =

- Municipality
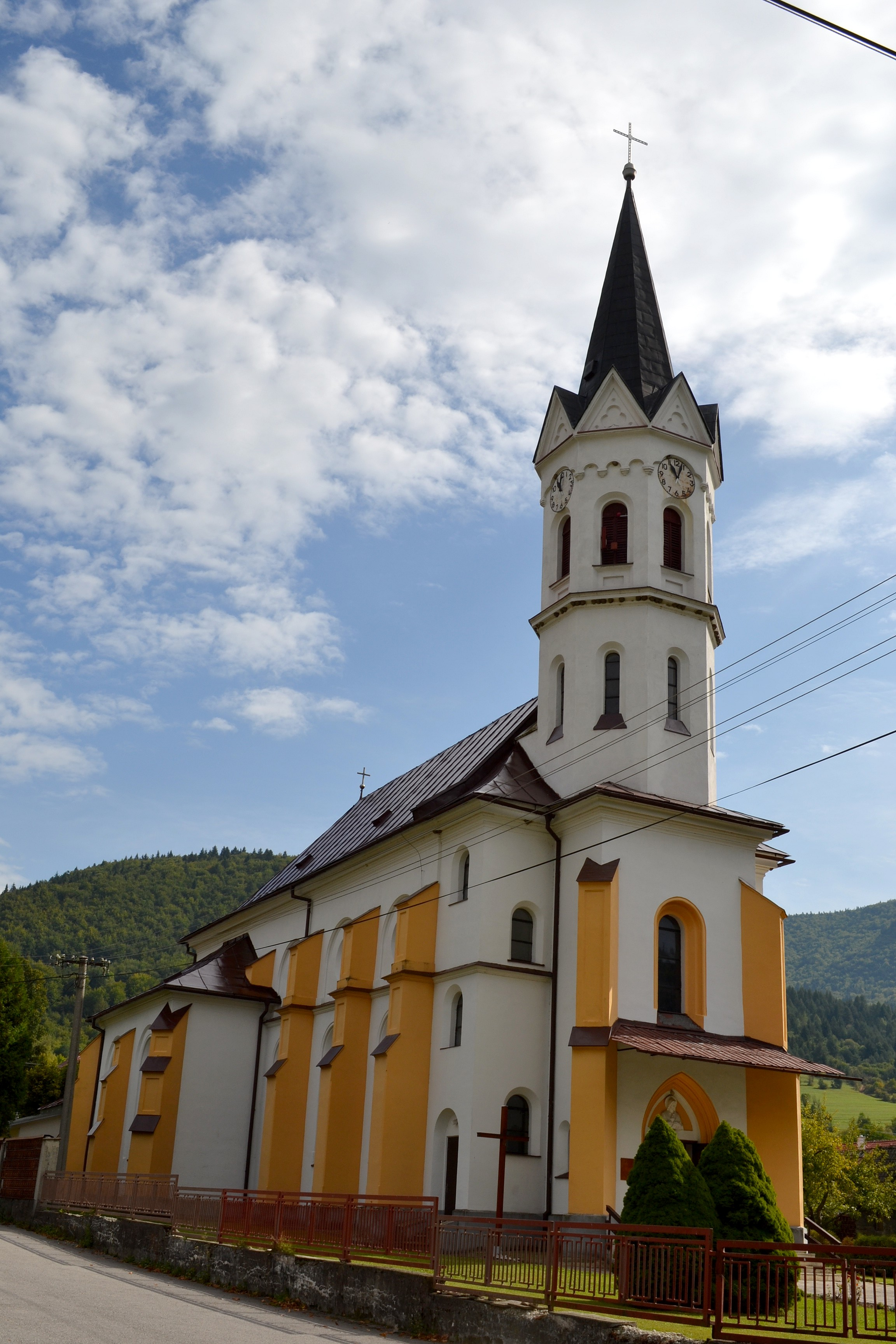

- Flag

- Location of Stankovany in the Žilina Region Location of Stankovany in Slovakia
- Coordinates: 49.15°N 19.18°E
- Country: Slovakia
- Region: Žilina Region
- District: Ružomberok District
- First mentioned: 1425

Area
  - Total: 18.92 km^{2} (7.31 sq mi)
- Elevation: 438 m (1,437 ft)

Population (2025)
  - Total: 1,129
- Time zone: UTC+1 (CET)
  - Summer (DST): UTC+2 (CEST)
- Postal code: 349 1
- Area code: +421 44
- Vehicle registration plate (until 2022): RK
- Website: www.stankovany.sk

Stankovany (Hungarian: Sztankován) is a village and municipality in Ružomberok District in the Žilina Region of northern Slovakia.

== History ==
In historical records the village was first mentioned in 1322.

== Geography ==
The municipality lies at an altitude of 438 metres (1,437 ft) and covers an area of 18.92 km^{2} (7.31 sq mi) (2025).

== Population ==
Population statistic (10 years)
Year	1995	2005	2015	2025
Count	1279	1209	1205	1129
Difference		−5.47%	−0.33%	−6.30%

Population statistic
Year	2024	2025
Count	1121	1129
Difference		+0.71%

It has a population of 1129 people (31 December 2025).

=== Ethnicity ===
Census 2021 (1+ %)
Ethnicity	Number	Fraction
Slovak	1114	96.95%
Not found out	28	2.43%
Total	1149	

In year 2021 was 1149 people by ethnicity 1114 as Slovak, 28 as Not found out, 10 as Czech, 6 as Other, 4 as Jewish, 2 as Ukrainian, 1 as Rusyn and 1 as Austrian.

Note on population: The difference values of population numbers in the table "Population statistic" and in the sections "Ethnicity" & "Religion" is caused by the use of various statistical methods.

=== Religion ===
Census 2021 (1+ %)
Religion	Number	Fraction
Roman Catholic Church	981	85.38%
None	81	7.05%
Not found out	29	2.52%
Evangelical Church	27	2.35%
Total	1149	

In year 2021 was 1149 people by religion 981 from Roman Catholic Church, 81 from None, 29 from Not found out, 27 from Evangelical Church, 11 from Ad hoc movements, 9 from Greek Catholic Church, 2 from Eastern Orthodox Church, 2 from Other and not ascertained christian church, 2 from Other, 1 from Jewish community, 1 from Paganism and natural spirituality, 1 from Islam, 1 from Seventh-day Adventist Church and 1 from Apostolic Church.
