= Kalameny =

Village and municipality in Slovakia

- Municipality
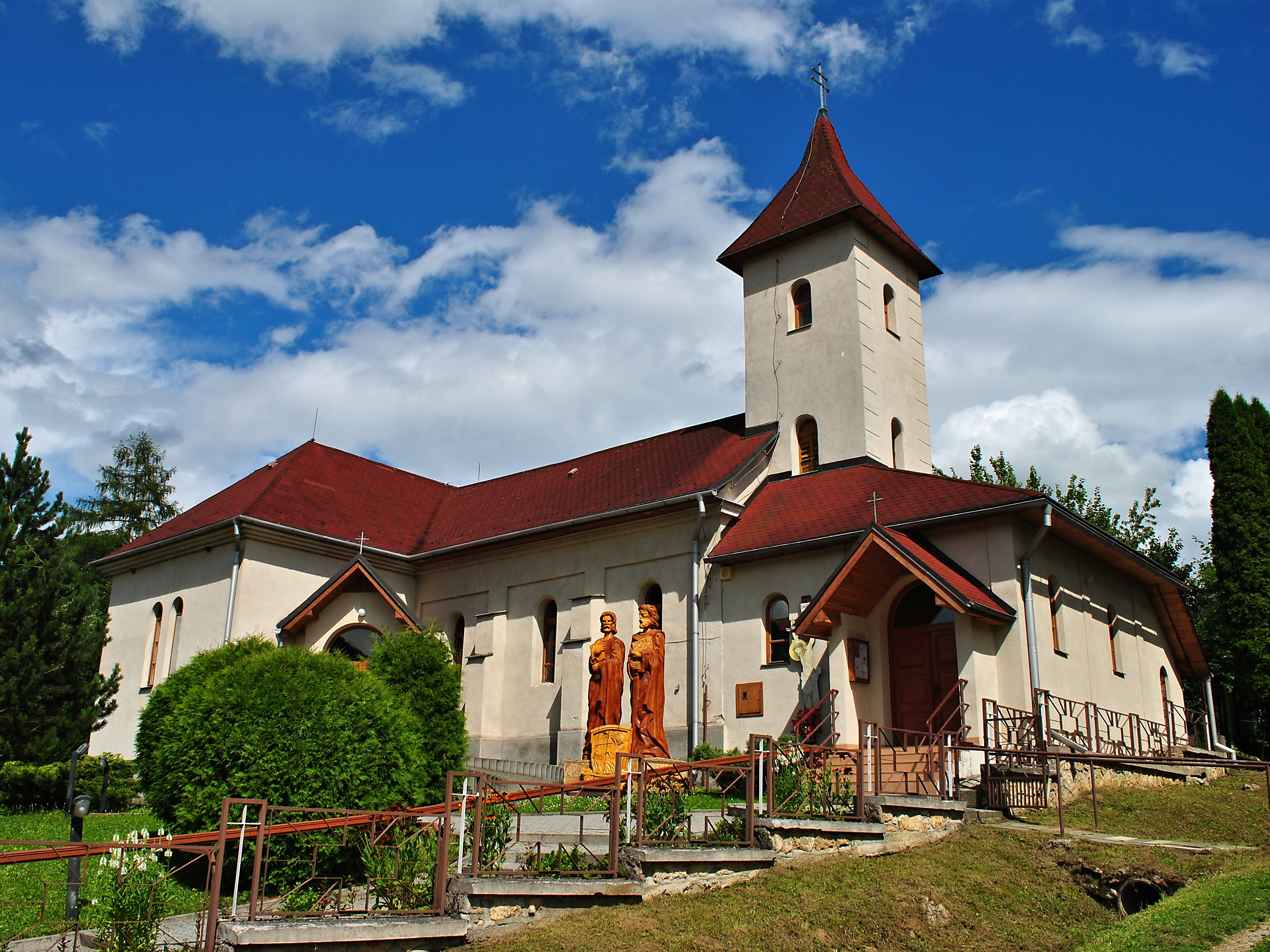

- Flag

- Location of Kalameny in the Žilina Region Location of Kalameny in Slovakia
- Coordinates: 49.13°N 19.42°E
- Country: Slovakia
- Region: Žilina Region
- District: Ružomberok District
- First mentioned: 1375

Area
  - Total: 8.70 km^{2} (3.36 sq mi)
- Elevation: 565 m (1,854 ft)

Population (2025)
  - Total: 413
- Time zone: UTC+1 (CET)
  - Summer (DST): UTC+2 (CEST)
- Postal code: 348 2
- Area code: +421 44
- Vehicle registration plate (until 2022): RK
- Website: www.kalameny.sk

Kalameny (Hungarian: Kelemenfalu) is a village and municipality in Ružomberok District in the Žilina Region of northern Slovakia.

== History ==
In historical records the village was first mentioned in 1264.

== Geography ==
The municipality lies at an altitude of 565 metres (1,854 ft) and covers an area of 8.70 km^{2} (3.36 sq mi) (2025).

== Population ==
Population statistic (10 years)
Year	1995	2005	2015	2025
Count	452	464	474	413
Difference		+2.65%	+2.15%	−12.86%

Population statistic
Year	2024	2025
Count	421	413
Difference		−1.90%

It has a population of 413 people (31 December 2025).

=== Ethnicity ===
Census 2021 (1+ %)
Ethnicity	Number	Fraction
Slovak	444	98.66%
Not found out	5	1.11%
Total	450	

In year 2021 was 450 people by ethnicity 444 as Slovak, 5 as Not found out, 4 as German, 2 as Czech, 2 as Moravian, 2 as Hungarian, 2 as Other, 1 as Romani and 1 as English.

Note on population: The difference values of population numbers in the table "Population statistic" and in the sections "Ethnicity" & "Religion" is caused by the use of various statistical methods.

=== Religion ===
Census 2021 (1+ %)
Religion	Number	Fraction
Roman Catholic Church	383	85.11%
None	49	10.89%
Evangelical Church	9	2%
Total	450	

In year 2021 was 450 people by religion 383 from Roman Catholic Church, 49 from None, 9 from Evangelical Church, 3 from Not found out, 2 from Other, 1 from Old Catholic Church, 1 from Christian Congregations in Slovakia, 1 from Church of Jesus Christ of Latter-day Saints and 1 from Ad hoc movements.

== Genealogical resources ==
The records for genealogical research are available at the state archive "Statny Archiv in Bytca, Slovakia"

- Roman Catholic church records (births/marriages/deaths): 1750-1921 (parish B)
- Lutheran church records (births/marriages/deaths): 1783-1895 (parish B)

== See also ==
- List of municipalities and towns in Slovakia
