= Liptovské Sliače =

- Municipality
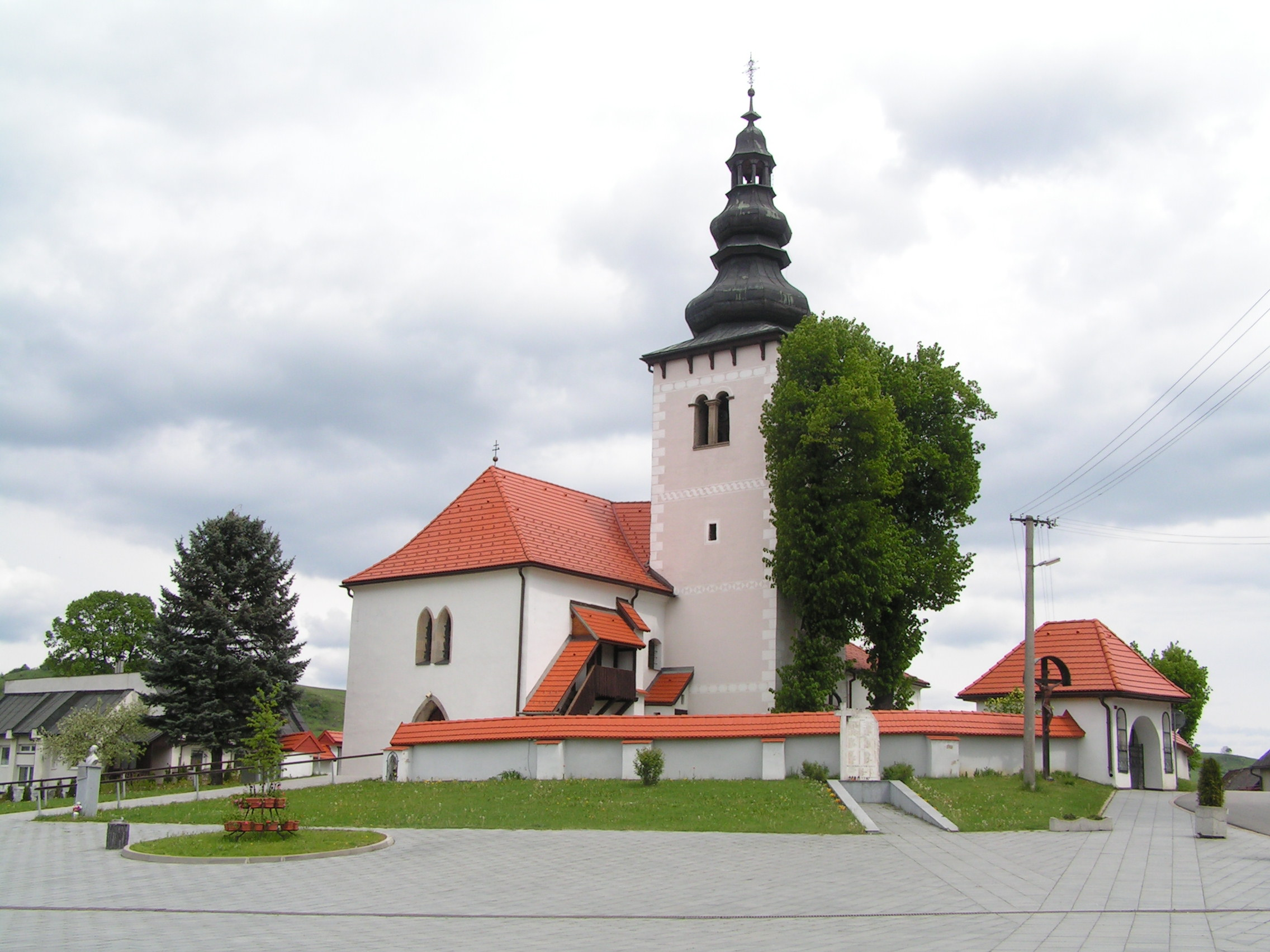
- Church of Saints Simon and Jude

- Flag

- Location of Liptovské Sliače in the Žilina Region Location of Liptovské Sliače in Slovakia
- Coordinates: 49.08°N 19.41°E
- Country: Slovakia
- Region: Žilina Region
- District: Ružomberok District
- First mentioned: 1263

Area
  - Total: 19.59 km^{2} (7.56 sq mi)
- Elevation: 537 m (1,762 ft)

Population (2025)
  - Total: 3,817
- Time zone: UTC+1 (CET)
  - Summer (DST): UTC+2 (CEST)
- Postal code: 343 4
- Area code: +421 44
- Vehicle registration plate (until 2022): RK
- Website: www.liptovskesliace.sk

Liptovské Sliače (until 2001 Sliače, historically also Tri Sliače; Hungarian: Háromszlécs) is a village and municipality in Ružomberok District in the Žilina Region of northern Slovakia.

== History ==
In historical records the village was first mentioned in 1263.

== Geography ==
The municipality lies at an altitude of 537 metres (1,762 ft) and covers an area of 19.59 km^{2} (7.56 sq mi) (2025).

== Population ==
Population statistic (10 years)
| Year | 1995 | 2005 | 2015 | 2025 |
|---|---|---|---|---|
| Count | 3809 | 3817 | 3756 | 3817 |
| Difference | | +0.21% | −1.59% | +1.62% |

Population statistic
| Year | 2024 | 2025 |
|---|---|---|
| Count | 3804 | 3817 |
| Difference | | +0.34% |

It has a population of 3817 people (31 December 2025).

=== Ethnicity ===
Census 2021 (1+ %)
| Ethnicity | Number | Fraction |
|---|---|---|
| Slovak | 3672 | 98.76% |
| Not found out | 44 | 1.18% |
| Total | 3718 | |

In year 2021 was 3718 people by ethnicity 3672 as Slovak, 44 as Not found out, 10 as Czech, 6 as Rusyn, 6 as Other, 4 as Russian, 2 as Jewish, 2 as Romani, 1 as Vietnamese, 1 as Polish and 1 as French.

Note on population: The difference values of population numbers in the table "Population statistic" and in the sections "Ethnicity" & "Religion" is caused by the use of various statistical methods.

=== Religion ===
Census 2021 (1+ %)
| Religion | Number | Fraction |
|---|---|---|
| Roman Catholic Church | 3341 | 89.86% |
| None | 246 | 6.62% |
| Not found out | 40 | 1.08% |
| Total | 3718 | |

In year 2021 was 3718 people by religion 3341 from Roman Catholic Church, 246 from None, 40 from Not found out, 31 from Evangelical Church, 21 from Greek Catholic Church, 11 from Other, 11 from Ad hoc movements, 5 from Other and not ascertained christian church, 3 from Buddhism, 3 from Apostolic Church, 2 from Calvinist Church, 1 from Jewish community, 1 from Old Catholic Church, 1 from Paganism and natural spirituality and 1 from Seventh-day Adventist Church.
