= Švošov =

Village and municipality in Ružomberok, Žilina, Slovakia

- Municipality
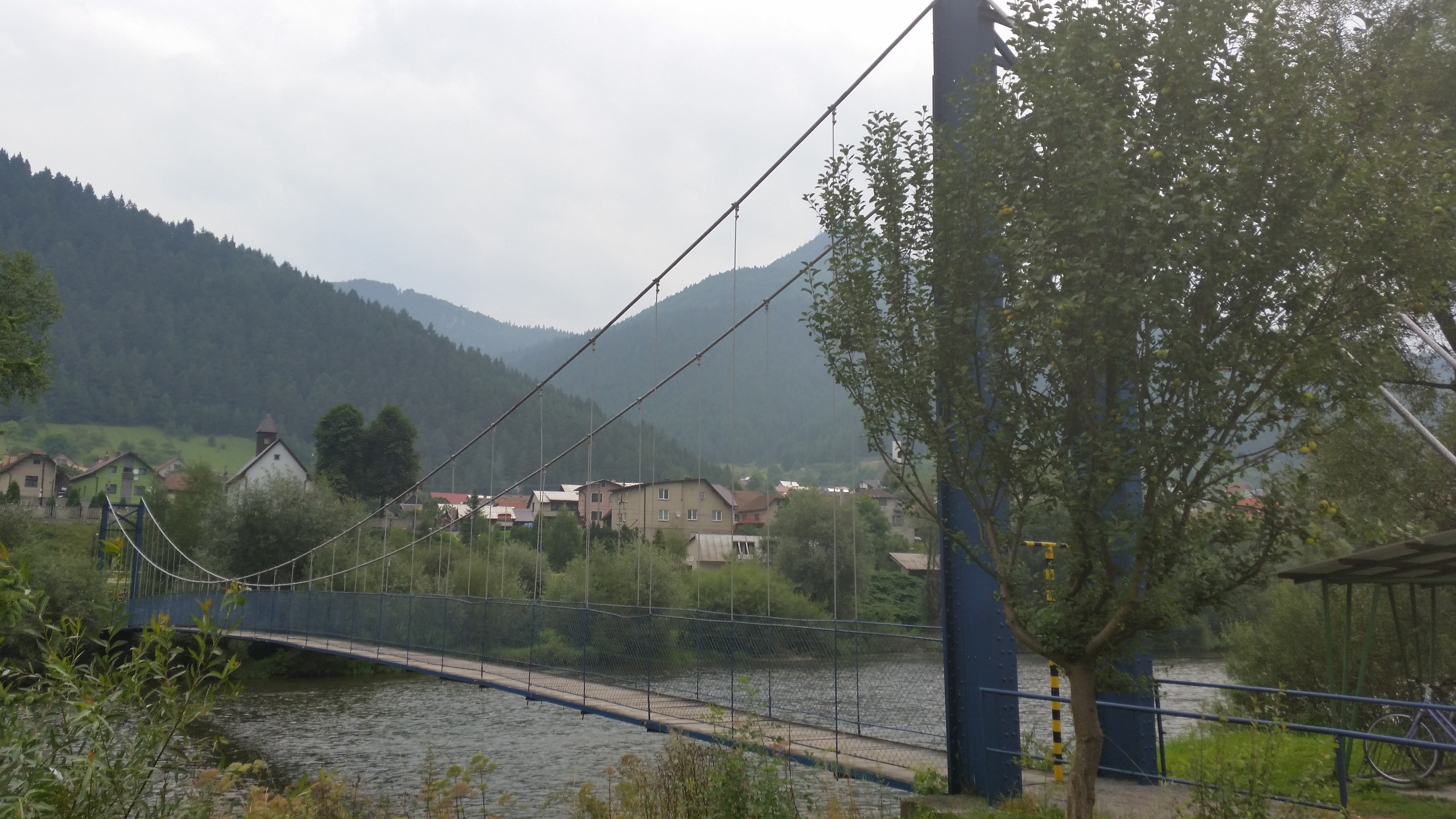

- Flag

- Location of Švošov in the Žilina Region Location of Švošov in Slovakia
- Coordinates: 49.12°N 19.20°E
- Country: Slovakia
- Region: Žilina Region
- District: Ružomberok District
- First mentioned: 1572

Area
  - Total: 4.27 km^{2} (1.65 sq mi)
- Elevation: 483 m (1,585 ft)

Population (2025)
  - Total: 869
- Time zone: UTC+1 (CET)
  - Summer (DST): UTC+2 (CEST)
- Postal code: 349 1
- Area code: +421 44
- Vehicle registration plate (until 2022): RK
- Website: www.svosov.sk

Švošov (Hungarian: Sósó) is a village and municipality in Ružomberok District in the Žilina Region of northern Slovakia. It has a population of about 860 people.

== History ==
The village was formed in the second half of the 15h century. In historical records the village was first mentioned in 1551.

== Geography ==
The municipality lies at an altitude of 483 metres (1,585 ft) and covers an area of 4.27 km^{2} (1.65 sq mi) (2025).

== Population ==
Population statistic (10 years)
Year	1995	2005	2015	2025
Count	773	832	815	869
Difference		+7.63%	−2.04%	+6.62%

Population statistic
Year	2024	2025
Count	864	869
Difference		+0.57%

It has a population of 869 people (31 December 2025).

=== Ethnicity ===
Census 2021 (1+ %)
Ethnicity	Number	Fraction
Slovak	846	98.83%
Not found out	10	1.16%
Total	856	

In year 2021 was 856 people by ethnicity 846 as Slovak, 10 as Not found out, 8 as Czech, 5 as English and 3 as Other.

Note on population: The difference values of population numbers in the table "Population statistic" and in the sections "Ethnicity" & "Religion" is caused by the use of various statistical methods.

=== Religion ===
Census 2021 (1+ %)
Religion	Number	Fraction
Roman Catholic Church	765	89.37%
None	67	7.83%
Evangelical Church	12	1.4%
Total	856	

In year 2021 was 856 people by religion 765 from Roman Catholic Church, 67 from None, 12 from Evangelical Church, 4 from Other and not ascertained christian church, 3 from Greek Catholic Church, 2 from Not found out, 2 from Ad hoc movements and 1 from Old Catholic Church.
