= Potok, Ružomberok District =

Village and municipality in Slovakia

Potok
- Municipality
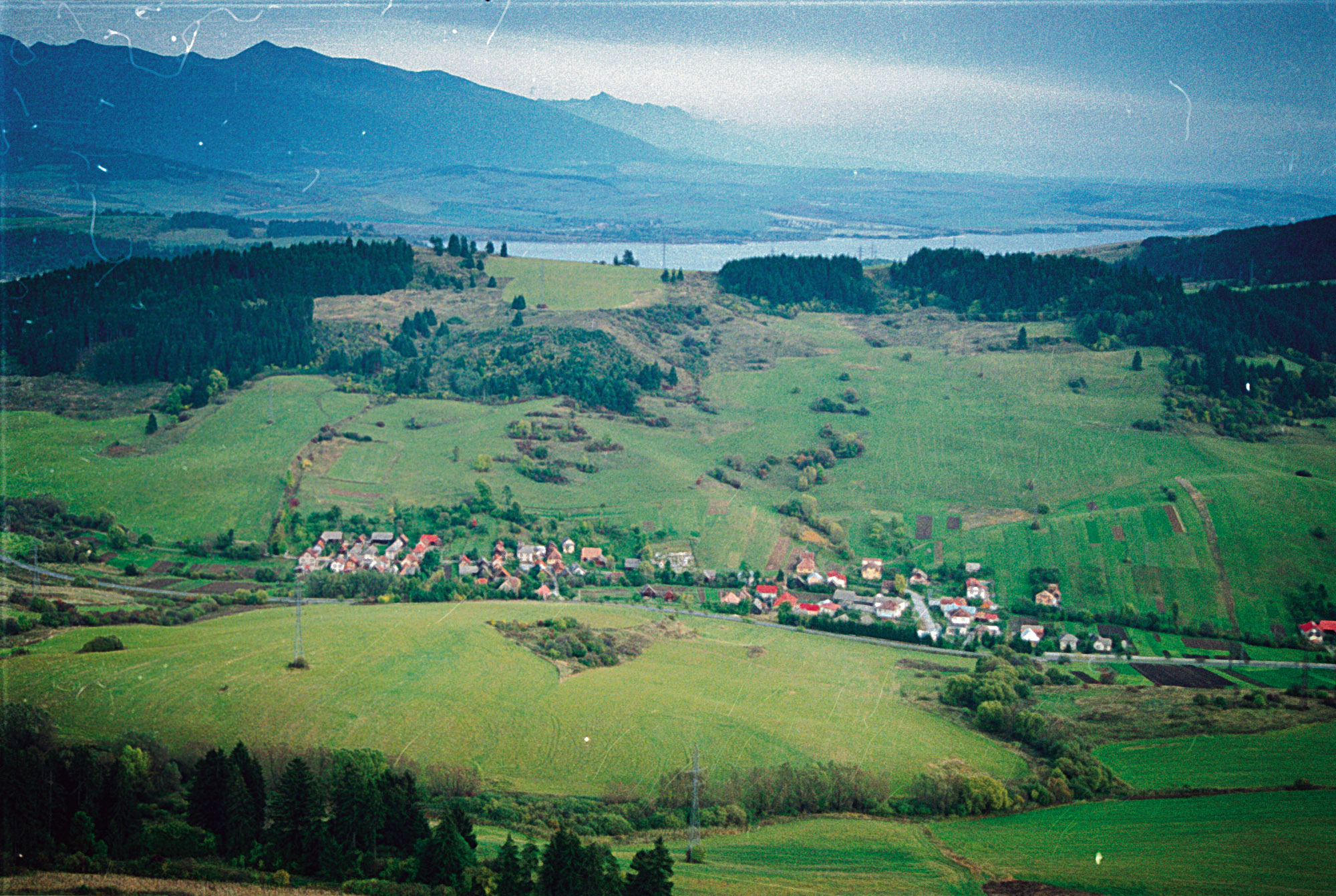

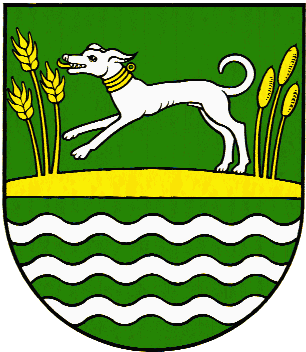
- Flag Coat of arms

- Location of Potok in the Žilina Region Location of Potok in Slovakia
- Coordinates: 49°06′45″N 19°26′50″E
- Country: Slovakia
- Region: Žilina Region
- District: Ružomberok District
- First mentioned: 1286

Area
  - Total: 1.49 km^{2} (0.58 sq mi)
- Elevation: 551 m (1,808 ft)

Population (2025)
  - Total: 104
- Time zone: UTC+1 (CET)
  - Summer (DST): UTC+2 (CEST)
- Postal code: 348 3
- Area code: +421 44
- Vehicle registration plate (until 2022): RK
- Website: www.potok.sk

Potok (Hungarian: Patak) is a village and municipality in Ružomberok District in the Žilina Region of northern Slovakia.

== History ==
In historical records the village was first mentioned in 1286.

== Geography ==
The municipality lies at an altitude of 551 metres (1,808 ft) and covers an area of 1.49 km^{2} (0.58 sq mi) (2025).

== Population ==
Population statistic (10 years)
Year	1995	2005	2015	2025
Count	120	115	104	104
Difference		−4.16%	−9.56%	+0%

Population statistic
Year	2024	2025
Count	104	104
Difference		+0%

It has a population of 104 people (31 December 2025).

=== Ethnicity ===
Census 2021 (1+ %)
Ethnicity	Number	Fraction
Slovak	93	94.89%
Ukrainian	3	3.06%
French	3	3.06%
Not found out	1	1.02%
Total	98	

In year 2021 was 98 people by ethnicity 93 as Slovak, 3 as Ukrainian, 3 as French and 1 as Not found out.

Note on population: The difference values of population numbers in the table "Population statistic" and in the sections "Ethnicity" & "Religion" is caused by the use of various statistical methods.

=== Religion ===
Census 2021 (1+ %)
Religion	Number	Fraction
Evangelical Church	39	39.8%
Roman Catholic Church	37	37.76%
None	18	18.37%
Eastern Orthodox Church	3	3.06%
Not found out	1	1.02%
Total	98	

In year 2021 was 98 people by religion 39 from Evangelical Church, 37 from Roman Catholic Church, 18 from None, 3 from Eastern Orthodox Church and 1 from Not found out.
