= Ružomberok District =

Coordinates: 49°4′54″N 19°18′16″E

- District
- Country: Slovakia
- Region (kraj): Žilina Region
- Cultural region: Liptov
- Seat: Ružomberok

Area
  - Total: 646.79 km^{2} (249.73 sq mi)

Population (2025)
  - Total: 56,022
- Time zone: UTC+1 (CET)
  - Summer (DST): UTC+2 (CEST)
- Telephone prefix: 044
- Vehicle registration plate (until 2022): RK
- Municipalities: 25

Ružomberok District (okres Ružomberok) is a district in the Žilina Region of central Slovakia. Until 1918, the district was part of the county of Kingdom of Hungary of Liptov.

== Population ==
Population statistic (10 years)
Year	1995	2005	2015	2025
Count	59,558	59,067	57,146	56,022
Difference		−0.82%	−3.25%	−1.96%

Population statistic
Year	2024	2025
Count	56,278	56,022
Difference		−0.45%

It has a population of 56,022 people (31 December 2025).

Historical population
Year	Pop.	±%
1970	54,278	—
1980	57,425	+5.8%
1991	58,403	+1.7%
2001	59,420	+1.7%
2011	58,014	−2.4%
2021	57,392	−1.1%
Source: Statistical Office of the Slovak Republic

=== Ethnicity ===
Census 2021 (1+ %)
Ethnicity	Number	Fraction
Slovak	54,624	93.55%
Not found out	2413	4.13%
Total	58,388	

In year 2021 was 58,388 people by ethnicity 54,624 as Slovak, 2413 as Not found out, 356 as Czech, 237 as Romani, 178 as Other, 104 as Hungarian, 85 as Russian, 66 as Ukrainian, 52 as Rusyn, 49 as Polish, 42 as German, 29 as Vietnamese, 17 as English, 16 as Irish, 15 as Italian, 15 as Serbian, 15 as Moravian, 13 as French, 12 as Jewish, 11 as Chinese, 9 as Austrian, 6 as Canadian, 5 as Silesian, 4 as Romanian, 4 as Croatian, 4 as Bulgarian, 3 as Turkish, 2 as Iranian and 2 as Albanian.

Note on population: The difference values of population numbers in the table "Population statistic" and in the sections "Ethnicity" & "Religion" is caused by the use of various statistical methods.

=== Religion ===
Census 2021 (1+ %)
Religion	Number	Fraction
Roman Catholic Church	41,659	72.59%
None	9644	16.8%
Not found out	2622	4.57%
Evangelical Church	1994	3.47%
Total	57,392	

In year 2021 was 57,392 people by religion 41,659 from Roman Catholic Church, 9644 from None, 2622 from Not found out, 1994 from Evangelical Church, 368 from Greek Catholic Church, 221 from Ad hoc movements, 166 from Other, 128 from Christian Congregations in Slovakia, 93 from Eastern Orthodox Church, 93 from Other and not ascertained christian church, 73 from Baptists Church, 70 from Jehovah's Witnesses, 52 from Buddhism, 37 from Paganism and natural spirituality, 32 from Calvinist Church, 28 from Islam, 25 from United Methodist Church, 21 from Old Catholic Church, 21 from Seventh-day Adventist Church, 15 from Jewish community, 11 from Apostolic Church, 7 from Hinduism, 5 from Czechoslovak Hussite Church, 4 from Church of the Brethren, 2 from Church of Jesus Christ of Latter-day Saints and 1 from New Apostolic Church.

== Municipalities ==
Municipality	Area [km^{2}]	Population
Bešeňová	4.29	766
Hubová	16.69	1,089
Ivachnová	5.89	772
Kalameny	8.70	413
Komjatná	14.54	1,563
Likavka	18.26	2,826
Liptovská Lúžna	54.66	2,677
Liptovská Osada	50.19	1,563
Liptovská Štiavnica	32.35	1,461
Liptovská Teplá	9.43	1,020
Liptovské Revúce	76.91	1,424
Liptovské Sliače	19.59	3,817
Liptovský Michal	1.59	312
Lisková	15.53	1,986
Ľubochňa	113.67	1,051
Lúčky	21.84	1,580
Ludrová	5.34	1,002
Martinček	2.47	472
Potok	1.49	104
Ružomberok	127.36	26,099
Stankovany	18.92	1,129
Štiavnička	1.71	923
Švošov	4.27	869
Turík	8.26	319
Valaská Dubová	12.79	785

Population and area values are current for year 2025.
