= Martinček =

Municipality in Ružomberok, Žilina, Slovakia

- Municipality
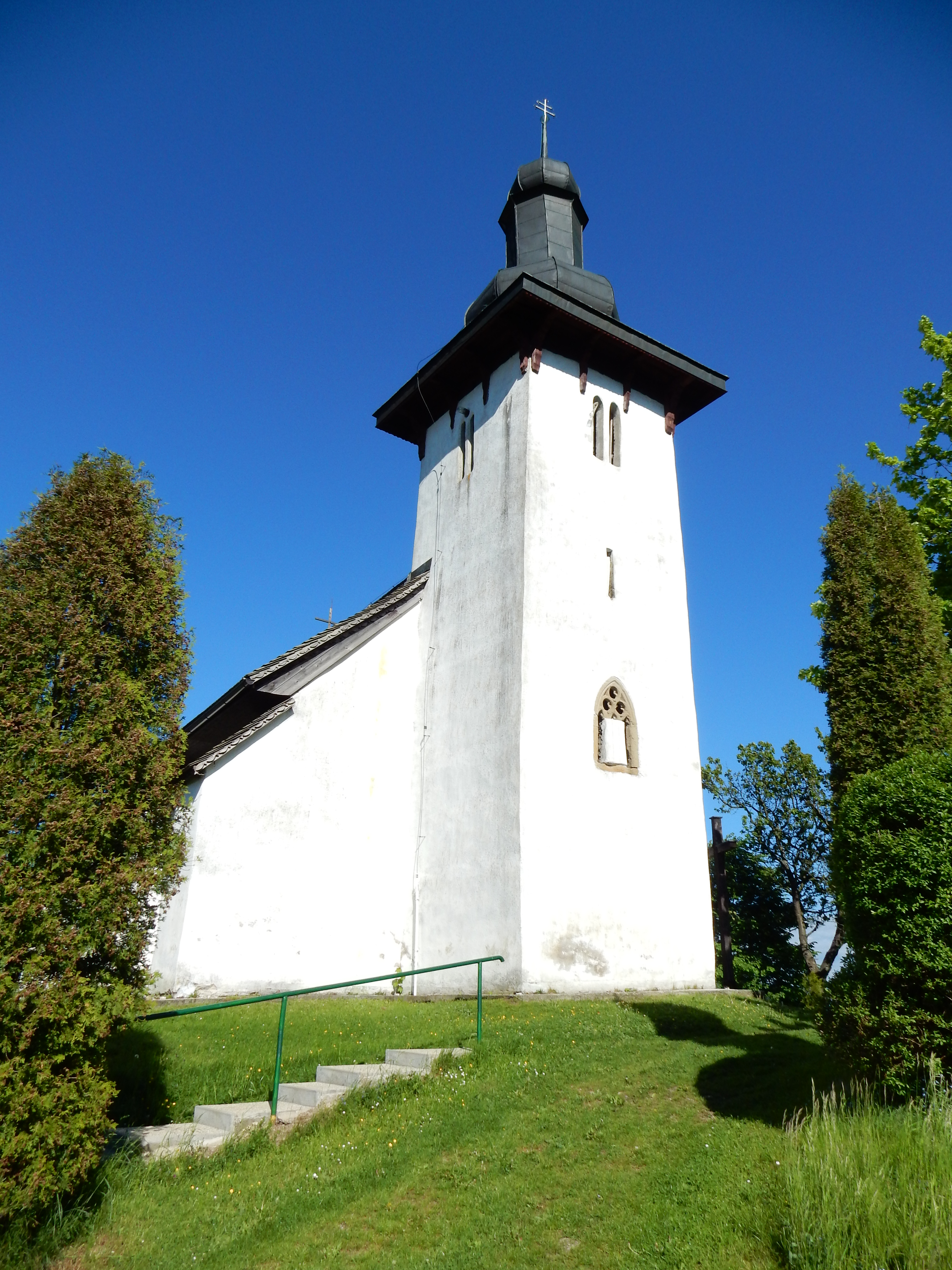

- Flag

- Location of Martinček in the Žilina Region Location of Martinček in Slovakia
- Coordinates: 49.08°N 19.33°E
- Country: Slovakia
- Region: Žilina Region
- District: Ružomberok District
- First mentioned: 1250

Area
  - Total: 2.47 km^{2} (0.95 sq mi)
- Elevation: 583 m (1,913 ft)

Population (2025)
  - Total: 472
- Time zone: UTC+1 (CET)
  - Summer (DST): UTC+2 (CEST)
- Postal code: 349 5
- Area code: +421 44
- Vehicle registration plate (until 2022): RK
- Website: www.martincek.sk

Martinček (Hungarian: Szentmárton) is a village and municipality in Ružomberok District in the Žilina Region of northern Slovakia.

== History ==
In historical records, the village was first mentioned in 1250.

== Geography ==
The municipality lies at an altitude of 583 metres (1,913 ft) and covers an area of 2.47 km^{2} (0.95 sq mi) (2025).

== Population ==
Population statistic (10 years)
Year	1995	2005	2015	2025
Count	380	394	428	472
Difference		+3.68%	+8.62%	+10.28%

Population statistic
Year	2024	2025
Count	466	472
Difference		+1.28%

It has a population of 472 people (31 December 2025).

=== Ethnicity ===
Census 2021 (1+ %)
Ethnicity	Number	Fraction
Slovak	441	97.56%
Not found out	10	2.21%
Total	452	

In year 2021 was 452 people by ethnicity 441 as Slovak, 10 as Not found out, 4 as Czech, 4 as Other, 1 as Italian, 1 as Russian, 1 as German and 1 as Hungarian.

Note on population: The difference values of population numbers in the table "Population statistic" and in the sections "Ethnicity" & "Religion" is caused by the use of various statistical methods.

=== Religion ===
Census 2021 (1+ %)
Religion	Number	Fraction
Roman Catholic Church	389	86.06%
None	31	6.86%
Other	13	2.88%
Not found out	9	1.99%
Total	452	

In year 2021 was 452 people by religion 389 from Roman Catholic Church, 31 from None, 13 from Other, 9 from Not found out, 4 from Greek Catholic Church, 3 from Evangelical Church, 2 from Christian Congregations in Slovakia and 1 from Ad hoc movements.
