= Lúčky, Ružomberok District =

Lúčky
- Municipality
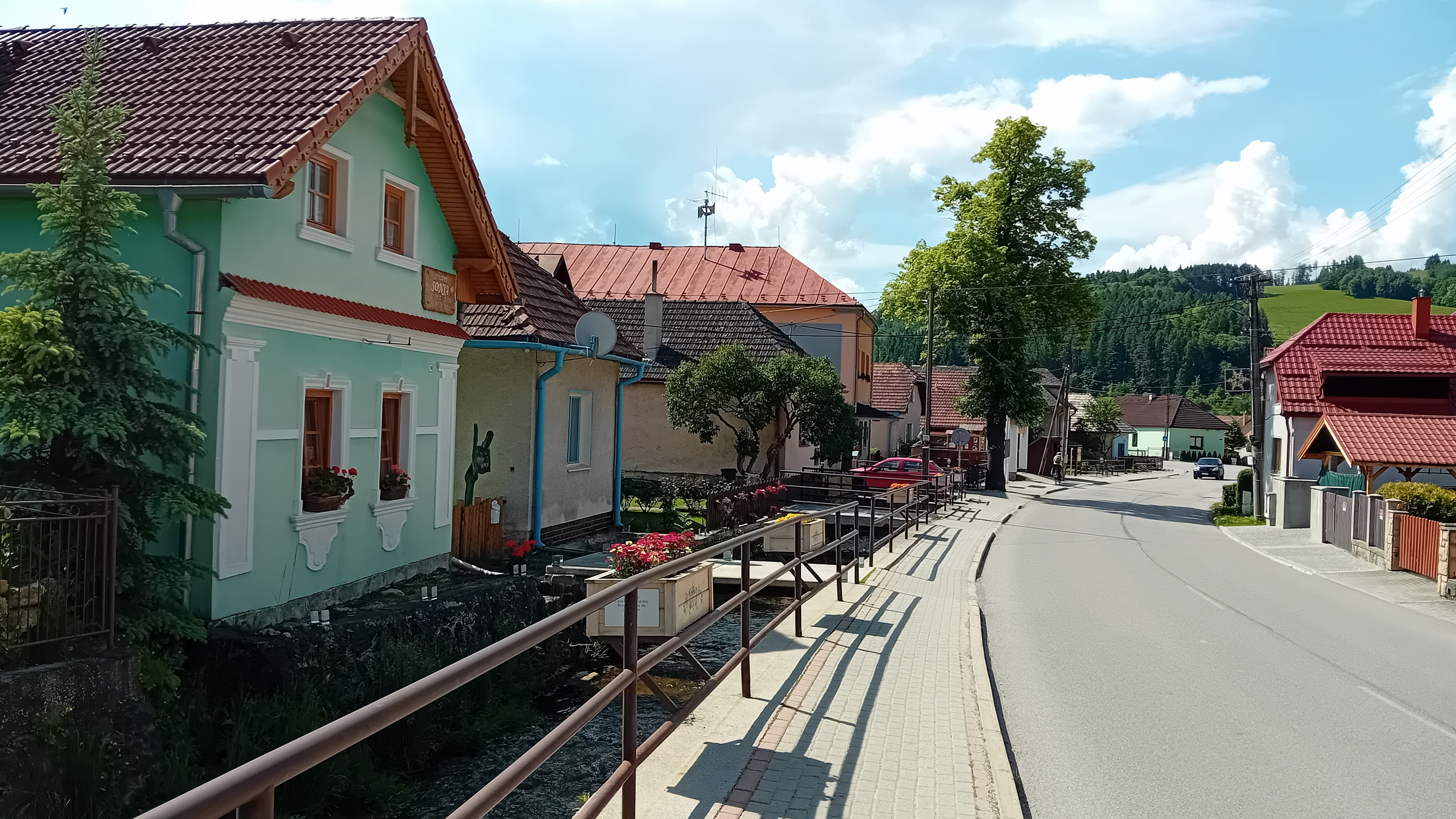

- Flag

- Location of Lúčky in the Žilina Region Location of Lúčky in Slovakia
- Coordinates: 49°7′20″N 19°24′30″E
- Country: Slovakia
- Region: Žilina Region
- District: Ružomberok District
- First mentioned: 1287

Area
  - Total: 21.84 km^{2} (8.43 sq mi)
- Elevation: 596 m (1,955 ft)

Population (2025)
  - Total: 1,580
- Time zone: UTC+1 (CET)
  - Summer (DST): UTC+2 (CEST)
- Postal code: 348 2
- Area code: +421 44
- Vehicle registration plate (until 2022): RK
- Website: www.obec-lucky.sk

Lúčky (Hungarian: Lucski) is a village and municipality in Ružomberok District in the Žilina Region of northern Slovakia.

== History ==
In historical records the village was first mentioned in 1287.

== Geography ==
The municipality lies at an altitude of 596 metres (1,955 ft) and covers an area of 21.84 km^{2} (8.43 sq mi) (2025).

== Population ==
Population statistic (10 years)
Year	1995	2005	2015	2025
Count	1712	1746	1807	1580
Difference		+1.98%	+3.49%	−12.56%

Population statistic
Year	2024	2025
Count	1576	1580
Difference		+0.25%

It has a population of 1580 people (31 December 2025).

=== Ethnicity ===
Census 2021 (1+ %)
Ethnicity	Number	Fraction
Slovak	1619	98.06%
Not found out	31	1.87%
Total	1651	

In year 2021 was 1651 people by ethnicity 1619 as Slovak, 31 as Not found out, 7 as Czech, 4 as Other, 3 as Russian, 3 as Hungarian, 2 as Irish, 2 as Austrian, 2 as German, 1 as Vietnamese, 1 as Ukrainian and 1 as French.

Note on population: The difference values of population numbers in the table "Population statistic" and in the sections "Ethnicity" & "Religion" is caused by the use of various statistical methods.

=== Religion ===
Census 2021 (1+ %)
Religion	Number	Fraction
Roman Catholic Church	1342	81.28%
None	210	12.72%
Evangelical Church	36	2.18%
Not found out	33	2%
Total	1651	

In year 2021 was 1651 people by religion 1342 from Roman Catholic Church, 210 from None, 36 from Evangelical Church, 33 from Not found out, 6 from Christian Congregations in Slovakia, 6 from Other, 6 from Ad hoc movements, 3 from Greek Catholic Church, 3 from Buddhism, 2 from Calvinist Church, 2 from Other and not ascertained christian church, 1 from Old Catholic Church and 1 from Eastern Orthodox Church.
