= Bešeňová =

- Municipality
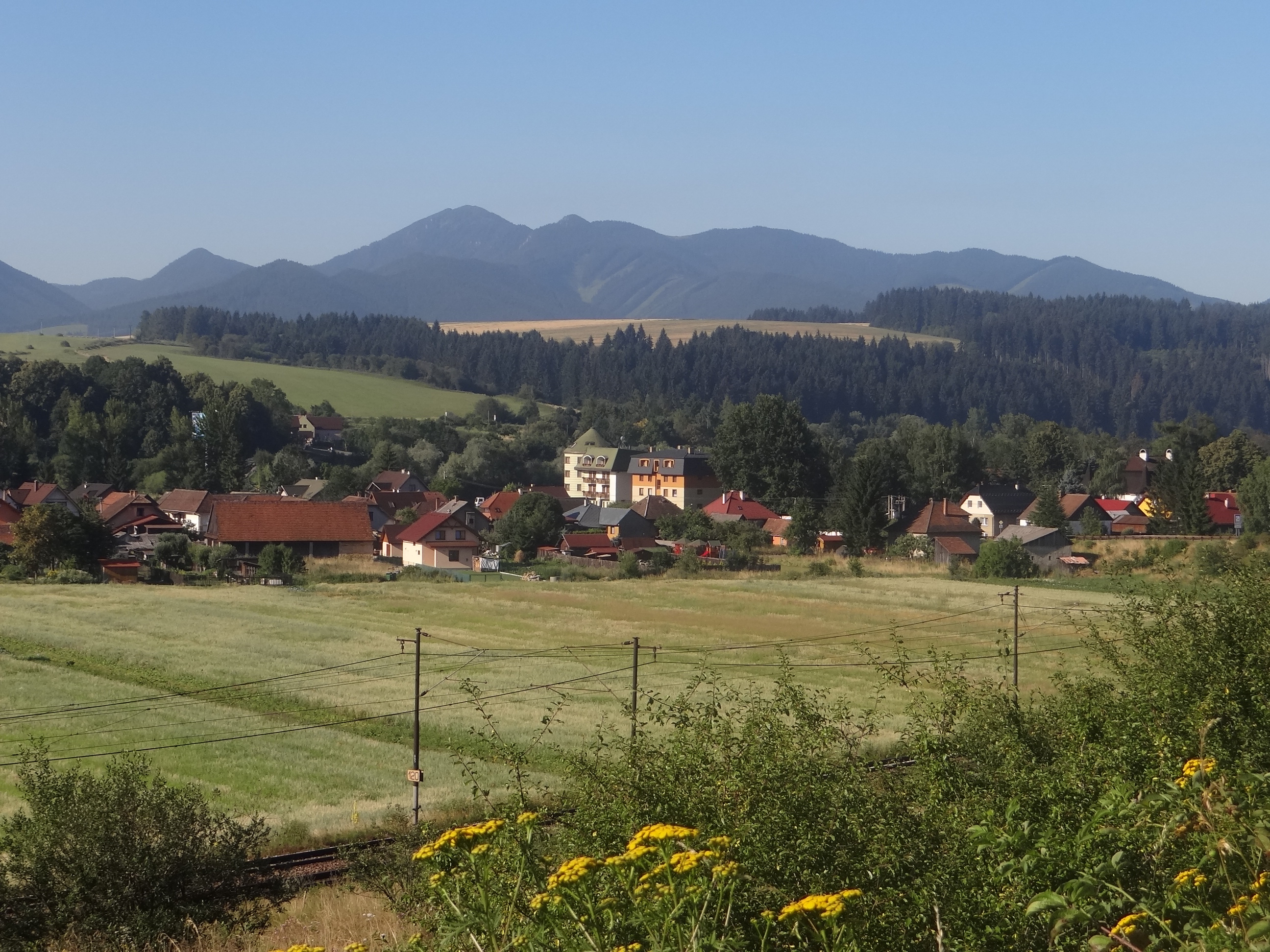

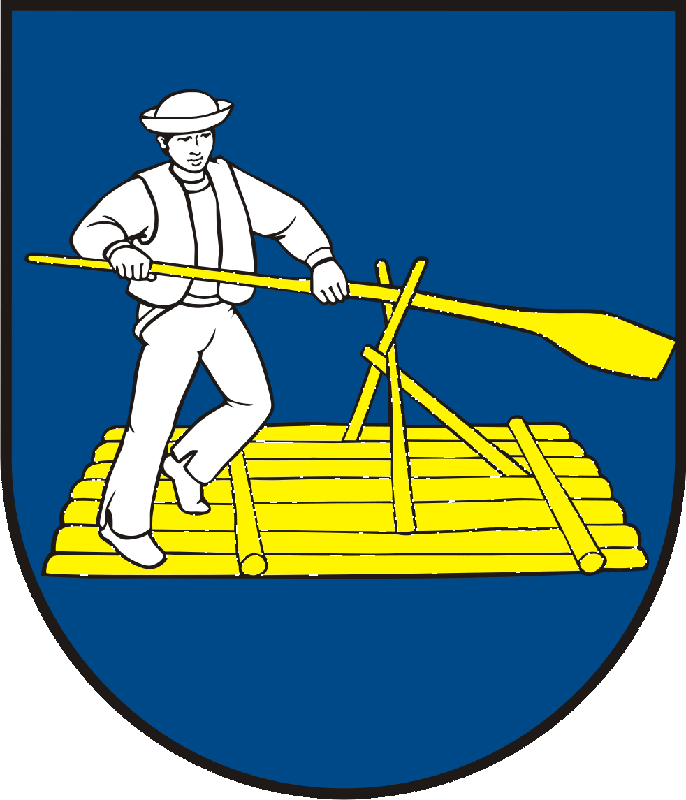
- Flag Coat of arms

- Location of Bešeňová in the Žilina Region Location of Bešeňová in Slovakia
- Coordinates: 49.10°N 19.45°E
- Country: Slovakia
- Region: Žilina Region
- District: Ružomberok District
- First mentioned: 1503

Area
  - Total: 4.29 km^{2} (1.66 sq mi)
- Elevation: 514 m (1,686 ft)

Population (2025)
  - Total: 766
- Time zone: UTC+1 (CET)
  - Summer (DST): UTC+2 (CEST)
- Postal code: 348 3
- Area code: +421 44
- Vehicle registration plate (until 2022): RK
- Website: www.obecbesenova.sk

Bešeňová (Hungarian: Besenyőfalu) is a village and municipality in Ružomberok District in the Žilina Region of northern Slovakia. It is famous for a hot spring water park attracting thousands of visitors all year round.

== History ==
In historical records the village was first mentioned in 1503.

== Geography ==
The municipality lies at an altitude of 514 metres (1,686 ft) and covers an area of 4.29 km^{2} (1.66 sq mi) (2025).

== Population ==
Population statistic (10 years)
Year	1995	2005	2015	2025
Count	403	376	646	766
Difference		−6.69%	+71.80%	+18.57%

Population statistic
Year	2024	2025
Count	772	766
Difference		−0.77%

It has a population of 766 people (31 December 2025).

=== Ethnicity ===
Census 2021 (1+ %)
Ethnicity	Number	Fraction
Slovak	605	92.08%
Not found out	48	7.3%
Total	657	

In year 2021 was 657 people by ethnicity 605 as Slovak, 48 as Not found out, 3 as Czech, 3 as Ukrainian, 3 as Hungarian, 2 as Polish, 2 as Other, 1 as Vietnamese and 1 as Canadian.

Note on population: The difference values of population numbers in the table "Population statistic" and in the sections "Ethnicity" & "Religion" is caused by the use of various statistical methods.

=== Religion ===
Census 2021 (1+ %)
Religion	Number	Fraction
Roman Catholic Church	441	67.12%
None	104	15.83%
Not found out	57	8.68%
Evangelical Church	33	5.02%
Ad hoc movements	7	1.07%
Total	657	

In year 2021 was 657 people by religion 441 from Roman Catholic Church, 104 from None, 57 from Not found out, 33 from Evangelical Church, 7 from Ad hoc movements, 6 from Greek Catholic Church, 3 from Calvinist Church, 2 from Other and not ascertained christian church, 2 from Buddhism, 1 from United Methodist Church and 1 from Seventh-day Adventist Church.
