= Liptovská Lúžna =

- Municipality
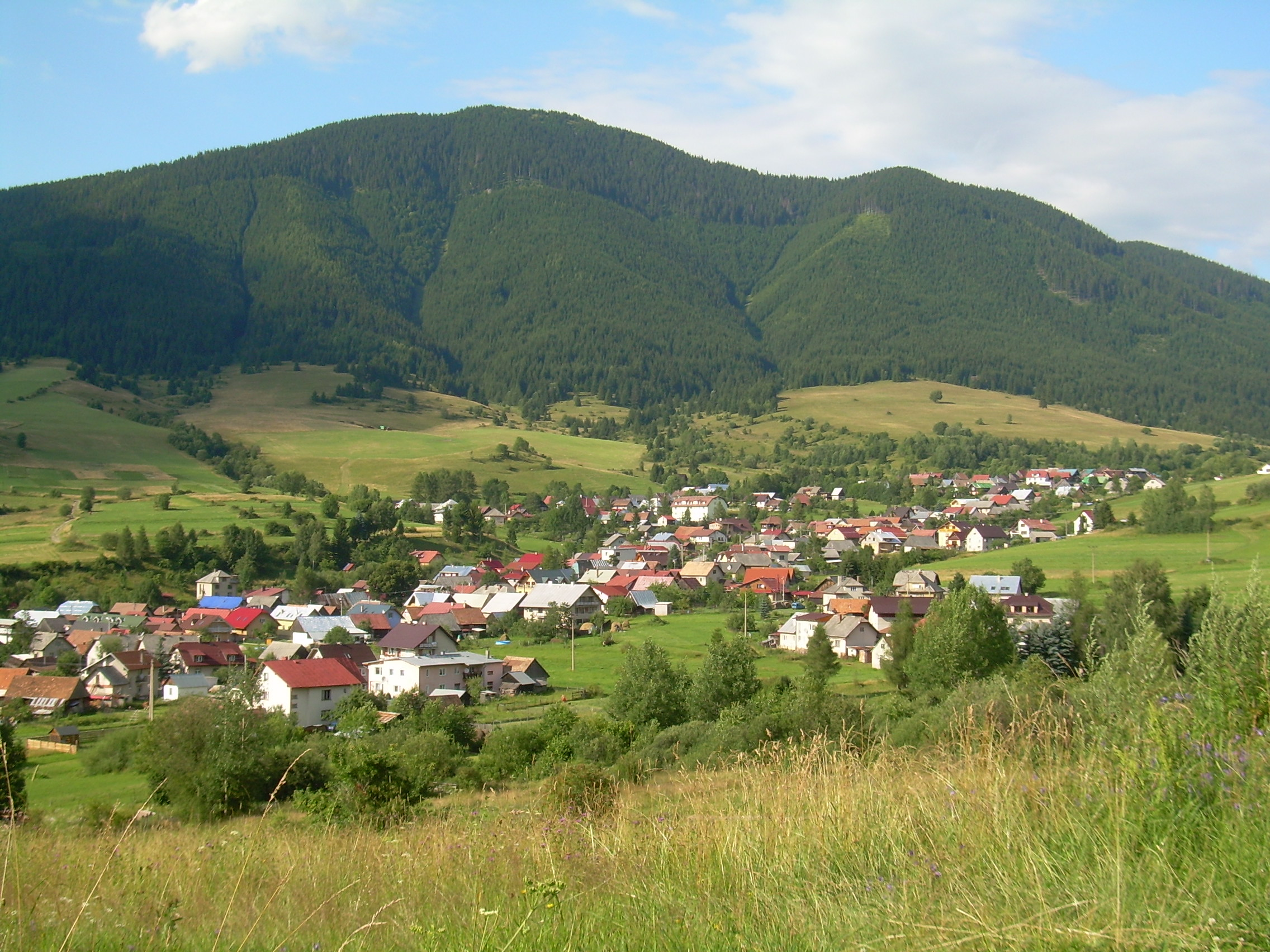

- Flag

- Location of Liptovská Lúžna in the Žilina Region Location of Liptovská Lúžna in Slovakia
- Coordinates: 48.93°N 19.33°E
- Country: Slovakia
- Region: Žilina Region
- District: Ružomberok District
- First mentioned: 1669

Area
  - Total: 54.66 km^{2} (21.10 sq mi)
- Elevation: 738 m (2,421 ft)

Population (2025)
  - Total: 2,677
- Time zone: UTC+1 (CET)
  - Summer (DST): UTC+2 (CEST)
- Postal code: 347 2
- Area code: +421 44
- Vehicle registration plate (until 2022): RK
- Website: www.liptovskaluzna.sk

Liptovská Lúžna (Hungarian: Lúzsna) is a village and municipality in Ružomberok District in the Žilina Region of northern Slovakia.

== History ==
In historical records the village was first mentioned in 1669.

== Geography ==
The municipality lies at an altitude of 738 metres (2,421 ft) and covers an area of 54.66 km^{2} (21.10 sq mi) (2025).

== Population ==
Population statistic (10 years)
Year	1995	2005	2015	2025
Count	3049	2955	2823	2677
Difference		−3.08%	−4.46%	−5.17%

Population statistic
Year	2024	2025
Count	2701	2677
Difference		−0.88%

It has a population of 2677 people (31 December 2025).

=== Ethnicity ===
Census 2021 (1+ %)
Ethnicity	Number	Fraction
Slovak	2716	97.62%
Not found out	62	2.22%
Total	2782	

In year 2021 was 2782 people by ethnicity 2716 as Slovak, 62 as Not found out, 5 as Czech, 4 as Polish, 3 as Canadian, 3 as Other, 2 as Russian, 2 as German, 1 as Ukrainian, 1 as Silesian, 1 as Rusyn and 1 as Hungarian.

Note on population: The difference values of population numbers in the table "Population statistic" and in the sections "Ethnicity" & "Religion" is caused by the use of various statistical methods.

=== Religion ===
Census 2021 (1+ %)
Religion	Number	Fraction
Roman Catholic Church	2396	86.13%
None	261	9.38%
Not found out	64	2.3%
Total	2782	

In year 2021 was 2782 people by religion 2396 from Roman Catholic Church, 261 from None, 64 from Not found out, 12 from Christian Congregations in Slovakia, 12 from Evangelical Church, 7 from Other, 6 from Paganism and natural spirituality, 6 from Other and not ascertained christian church, 5 from Greek Catholic Church, 5 from Ad hoc movements, 2 from Eastern Orthodox Church, 1 from Calvinist Church, 1 from Jehovah's Witnesses, 1 from Czechoslovak Hussite Church, 1 from Church of the Brethren, 1 from Buddhism and 1 from Apostolic Church.
