= Ludrová =

- Municipality
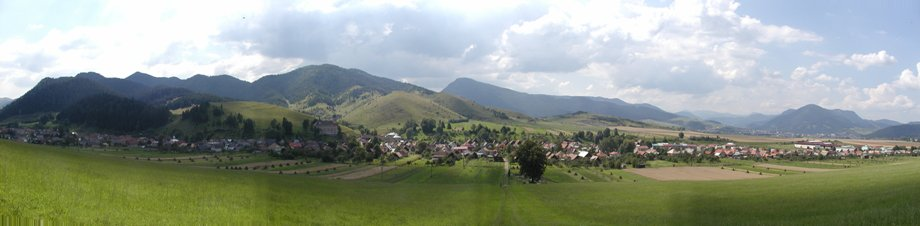

- Flag

- Location of Ludrová in the Žilina Region Location of Ludrová in Slovakia
- Coordinates: 49.05°N 19.33°E
- Country: Slovakia
- Region: Žilina Region
- District: Ružomberok District
- First mentioned: 1461

Area
  - Total: 5.34 km^{2} (2.06 sq mi)
- Elevation: 567 m (1,860 ft)

Population (2025)
  - Total: 1,002
- Time zone: UTC+1 (CET)
  - Summer (DST): UTC+2 (CEST)
- Postal code: 347 1
- Area code: +421 44
- Vehicle registration plate (until 2022): RK
- Website: www.ludrova.sk

Ludrová (Hungarian: Nemesludrova) is a village and municipality in Ružomberok District in the Žilina Region of northern Slovakia.

== History ==
In historical records the village was first mentioned in 1376.

== Geography ==
The municipality lies at an altitude of 567 metres (1,860 ft) and covers an area of 5.34 km^{2} (2.06 sq mi) (2025).

== Population ==
Population statistic (10 years)
Year	1995	2005	2015	2025
Count	964	985	999	1002
Difference		+2.17%	+1.42%	+0.30%

Population statistic
Year	2024	2025
Count	994	1002
Difference		+0.80%

It has a population of 1002 people (31 December 2025).

=== Ethnicity ===
Census 2021 (1+ %)
Ethnicity	Number	Fraction
Slovak	995	99.5%
Total	1000	

In year 2021 was 1000 people by ethnicity 995 as Slovak, 6 as Not found out, 5 as Czech, 1 as Ukrainian, 1 as Russian, 1 as Austrian and 1 as Other.

Note on population: The difference values of population numbers in the table "Population statistic" and in the sections "Ethnicity" & "Religion" is caused by the use of various statistical methods.

=== Religion ===
Census 2021 (1+ %)
Religion	Number	Fraction
Roman Catholic Church	826	82.6%
None	131	13.1%
Evangelical Church	21	2.1%
Total	1000	

In year 2021 was 1000 people by religion 826 from Roman Catholic Church, 131 from None, 21 from Evangelical Church, 9 from Not found out, 5 from Greek Catholic Church, 4 from Other, 1 from Eastern Orthodox Church, 1 from Czechoslovak Hussite Church, 1 from Buddhism and 1 from Ad hoc movements.
