= Turík =

- Municipality
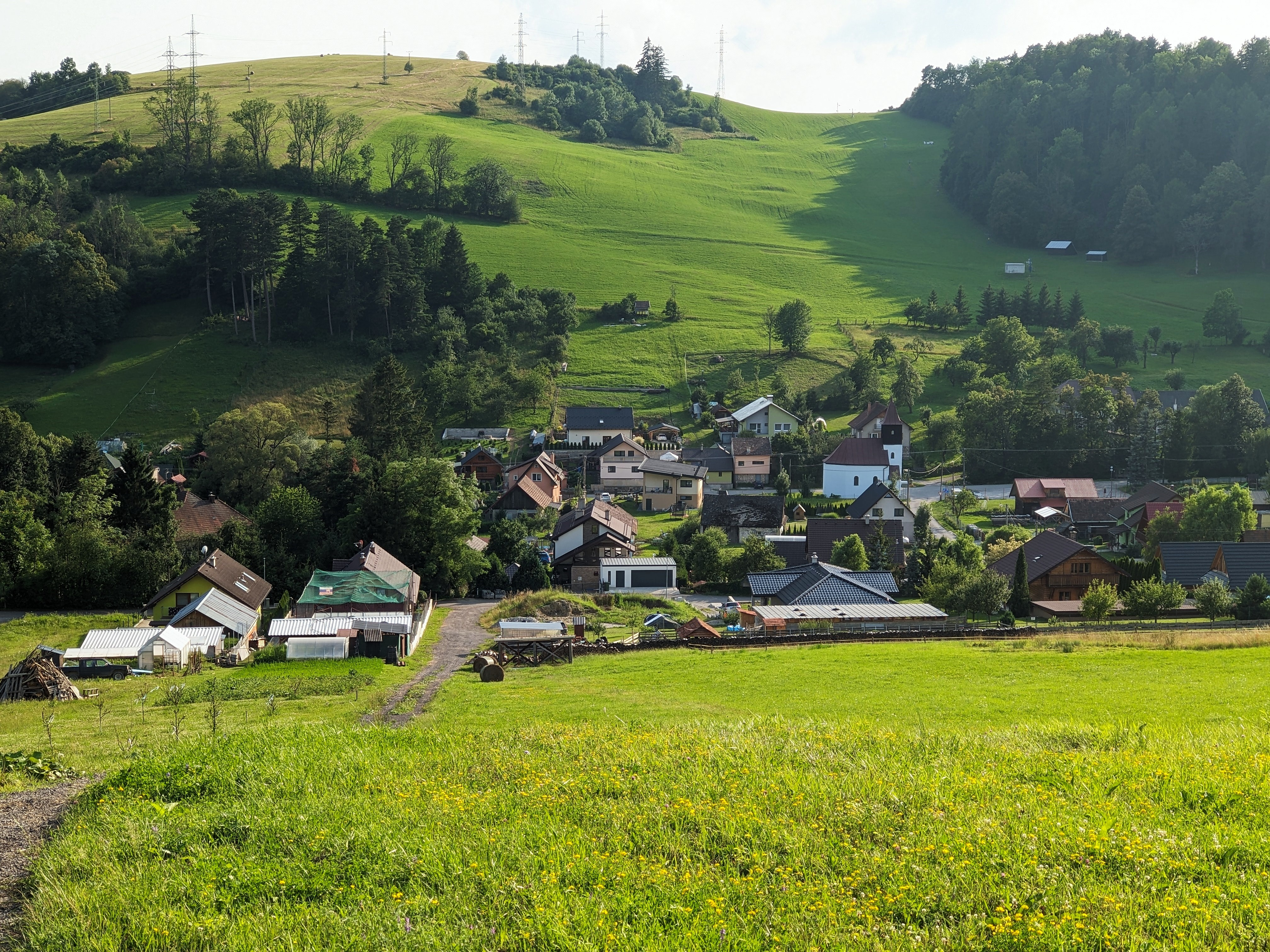

- Flag

- Location of Turík in the Žilina Region Location of Turík in Slovakia
- Coordinates: 49.12°N 19.38°E
- Country: Slovakia
- Region: Žilina Region
- District: Ružomberok District
- First mentioned: 1278

Area
  - Total: 8.26 km^{2} (3.19 sq mi)
- Elevation: 556 m (1,824 ft)

Population (2025)
  - Total: 319
- Time zone: UTC+1 (CET)
  - Summer (DST): UTC+2 (CEST)
- Postal code: 348 1
- Area code: +421 44
- Vehicle registration plate (until 2022): RK
- Website: www.turik.sk

Turík (Hungarian: Turapatak) is a village and municipality in Ružomberok District in the Žilina Region of northern Slovakia.

== History ==
The village was first mentioned in historical records of 1278.

== Geography ==
The municipality lies at an altitude of 556 metres (1,824 ft) and covers an area of 8.26 km^{2} (3.19 sq mi) (2025).

== Population ==
Population statistic (10 years)
Year	1995	2005	2015	2025
Count	215	216	239	319
Difference		+0.46%	+10.64%	+33.47%

Population statistic
Year	2024	2025
Count	300	319
Difference		+6.33%

It has a population of 319 people (31 December 2025).

=== Ethnicity ===
Census 2021 (1+ %)
Ethnicity	Number	Fraction
Slovak	274	98.2%
Not found out	5	1.79%
Total	279	

In year 2021 was 279 people by ethnicity 274 as Slovak, 5 as Not found out and 1 as Czech.

Note on population: The difference values of population numbers in the table "Population statistic" and in the sections "Ethnicity" & "Religion" is caused by the use of various statistical methods.

=== Religion ===
Census 2021 (1+ %)
Religion	Number	Fraction
Roman Catholic Church	200	71.68%
None	53	19%
Evangelical Church	14	5.02%
Jehovah's Witnesses	4	1.43%
Not found out	4	1.43%
Total	279	

In year 2021 was 279 people by religion 200 from Roman Catholic Church, 53 from None, 14 from Evangelical Church, 4 from Jehovah's Witnesses, 4 from Not found out, 2 from Calvinist Church, 1 from Greek Catholic Church and 1 from Ad hoc movements.
