= Liptovský Michal =

- Municipality
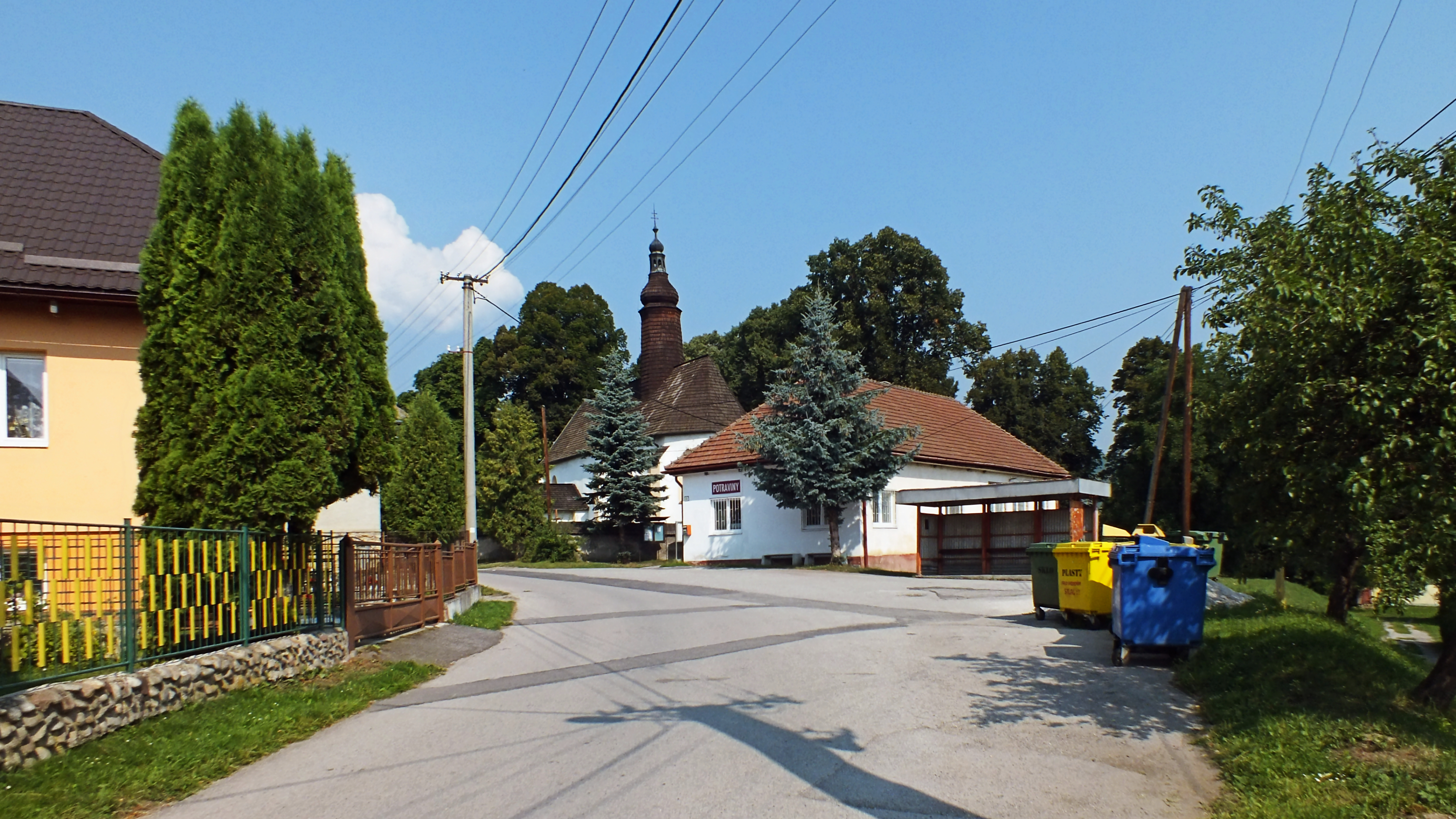

- Flag

- Location of Liptovský Michal in the Žilina Region Location of Liptovský Michal in Slovakia
- Coordinates: 49.10°N 19.43°E
- Country: Slovakia
- Region: Žilina Region
- District: Ružomberok District
- First mentioned: 1331

Area
  - Total: 1.59 km^{2} (0.61 sq mi)
- Elevation: 520 m (1,710 ft)

Population (2025)
  - Total: 312
- Time zone: UTC+1 (CET)
  - Summer (DST): UTC+2 (CEST)
- Postal code: 348 3
- Area code: +421 44
- Vehicle registration plate (until 2022): RK
- Website: www.liptovskymichal.sk

Liptovský Michal (Hungarian: Szentmihály) is a village and municipality in Ružomberok District in the Žilina Region of northern Slovakia.

== History ==
In historical records the village was first mentioned in 1331.

== Geography ==
The municipality lies at an altitude of 520 metres (1,710 ft) and covers an area of 1.59 km^{2} (0.61 sq mi) (2025).

== Population ==
Population statistic (10 years)
Year	1995	2005	2015	2025
Count	235	279	302	312
Difference		+18.72%	+8.24%	+3.31%

Population statistic
Year	2024	2025
Count	306	312
Difference		+1.96%

It has a population of 312 people (31 December 2025).

=== Ethnicity ===
Census 2021 (1+ %)
Ethnicity	Number	Fraction
Slovak	290	96.34%
Not found out	11	3.65%
Total	301	

In year 2021 was 301 people by ethnicity 290 as Slovak, 11 as Not found out and 1 as Rusyn.

Note on population: The difference values of population numbers in the table "Population statistic" and in the sections "Ethnicity" & "Religion" is caused by the use of various statistical methods.

=== Religion ===
Census 2021 (1+ %)
Religion	Number	Fraction
Roman Catholic Church	234	77.74%
None	45	14.95%
Not found out	10	3.32%
Evangelical Church	10	3.32%
Total	301	

In year 2021 was 301 people by religion 234 from Roman Catholic Church, 45 from None, 10 from Not found out, 10 from Evangelical Church and 2 from Greek Catholic Church.
