= Valaská Dubová =

- Municipality
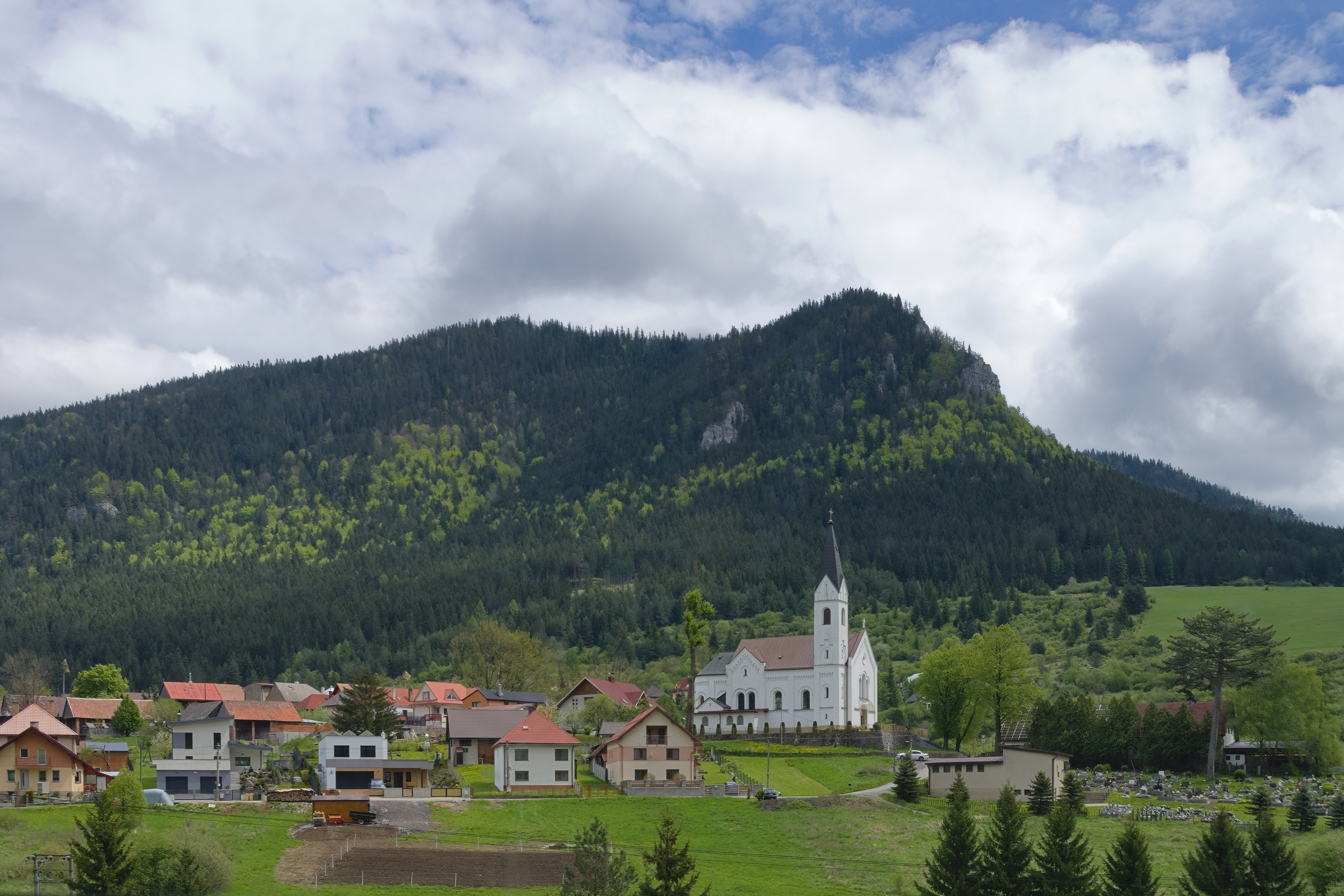

- Flag

- Location of Valaská Dubová in the Žilina Region Location of Valaská Dubová in Slovakia
- Coordinates: 49.13°N 19.30°E
- Country: Slovakia
- Region: Žilina Region
- District: Ružomberok District
- First mentioned: 1322

Area
  - Total: 12.79 km^{2} (4.94 sq mi)
- Elevation: 662 m (2,172 ft)

Population (2025)
  - Total: 785
- Time zone: UTC+1 (CET)
  - Summer (DST): UTC+2 (CEST)
- Postal code: 349 6
- Area code: +421 44
- Vehicle registration plate (until 2022): RK
- Website: www.valaskadubova.sk

Valaská Dubová (Hungarian: Oláhdubova) is a village and municipality in Ružomberok District in the Žilina Region of northern Slovakia.

== History ==
In historical records the village was first mentioned in 1322.

== Geography ==
The municipality lies at an altitude of 662 metres (2,172 ft) and covers an area of 12.79 km^{2} (4.94 sq mi) (2025).

== Population ==
Population statistic (10 years)
Year	1995	2005	2015	2025
Count	769	780	775	785
Difference		+1.43%	−0.64%	+1.29%

Population statistic
Year	2024	2025
Count	775	785
Difference		+1.29%

It has a population of 785 people (31 December 2025).

=== Ethnicity ===
Census 2021 (1+ %)
Ethnicity	Number	Fraction
Slovak	762	97.44%
Not found out	17	2.17%
Total	782	

In year 2021 was 782 people by ethnicity 762 as Slovak, 17 as Not found out, 4 as Ukrainian, 1 as Czech, 1 as Italian, 1 as Polish and 1 as German.

Note on population: The difference values of population numbers in the table "Population statistic" and in the sections "Ethnicity" & "Religion" is caused by the use of various statistical methods.

=== Religion ===
Census 2021 (1+ %)
Religion	Number	Fraction
Roman Catholic Church	692	88.49%
None	60	7.67%
Not found out	21	2.69%
Total	782	

In year 2021 was 782 people by religion 692 from Roman Catholic Church, 60 from None, 21 from Not found out, 4 from Evangelical Church, 3 from Paganism and natural spirituality, 1 from Other and 1 from Ad hoc movements.
