= Hungarian toponyms in Slovakia =

List of Hungarian exonyms for places in Slovakia. These names are used by the Hungarian ethnic minority in Slovakia, and they are also used in Hungary and other countries in the Central Europe, which are home of Hungarian minorities. In communities in Slovakia where the ethnic minority represents 20% or more of the population, it has certain cultural and linguistic rights.

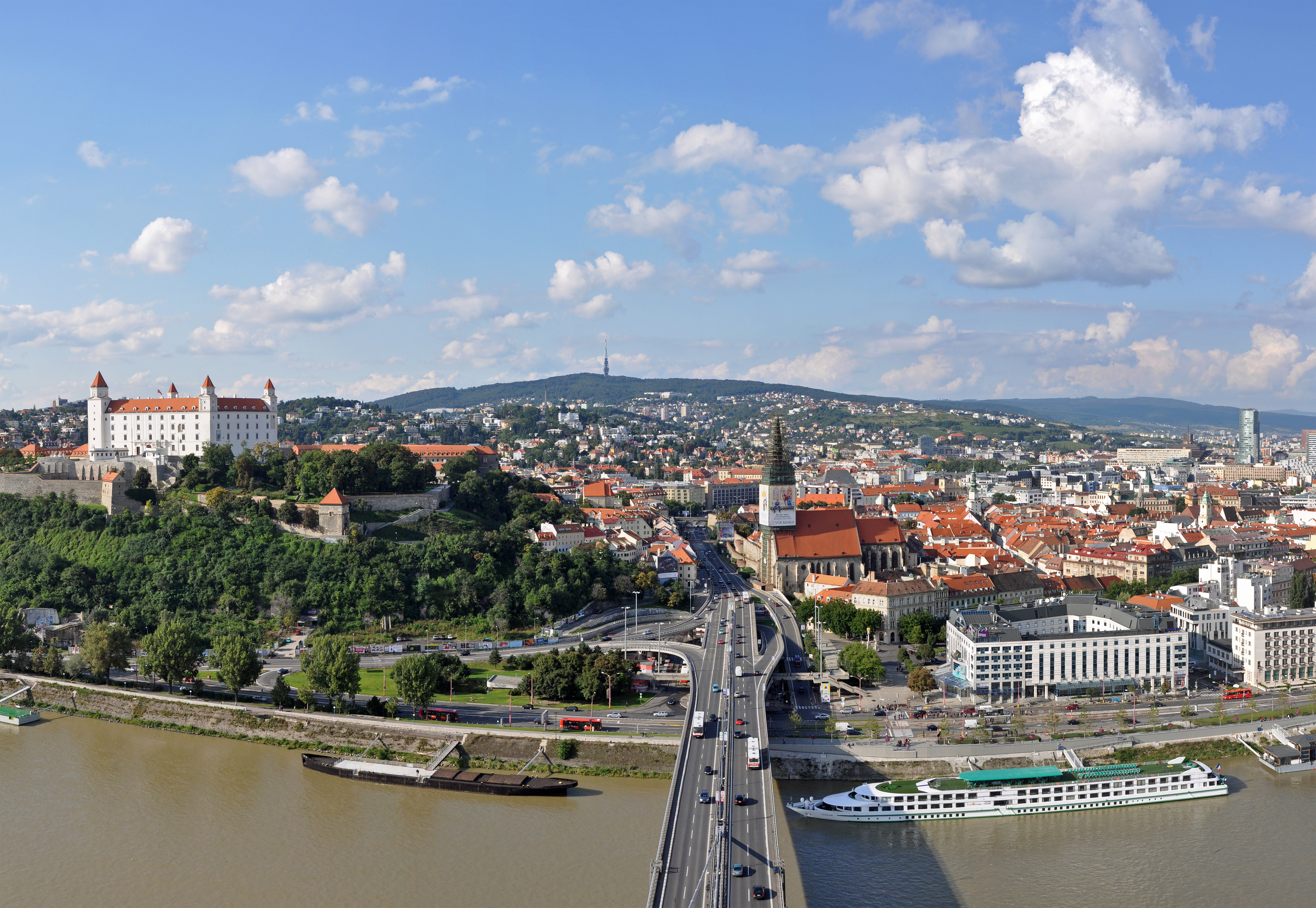
Bratislava

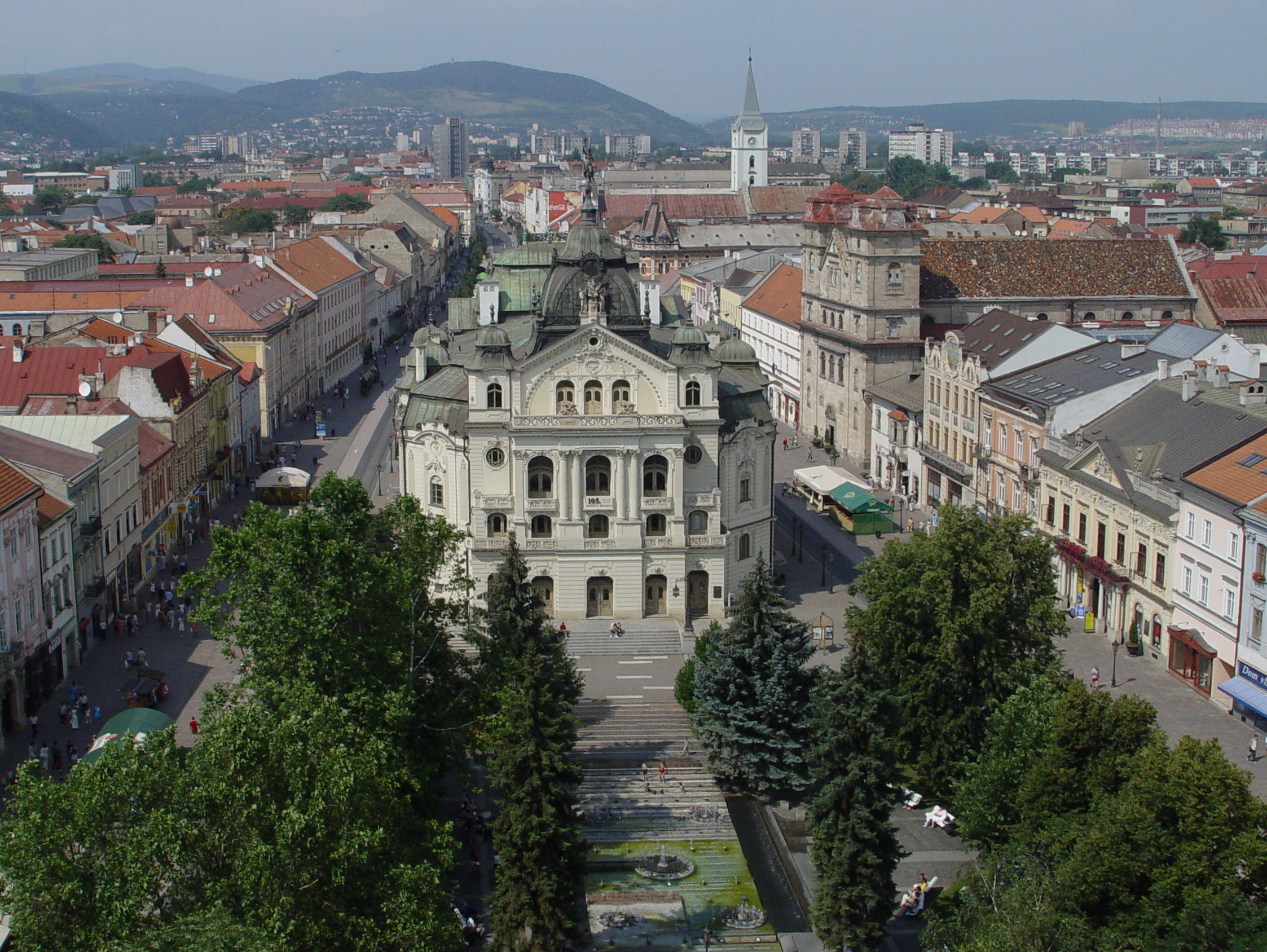
Košice

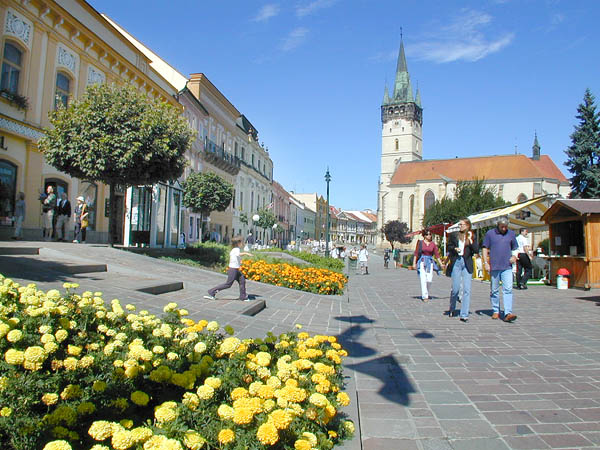
Prešov

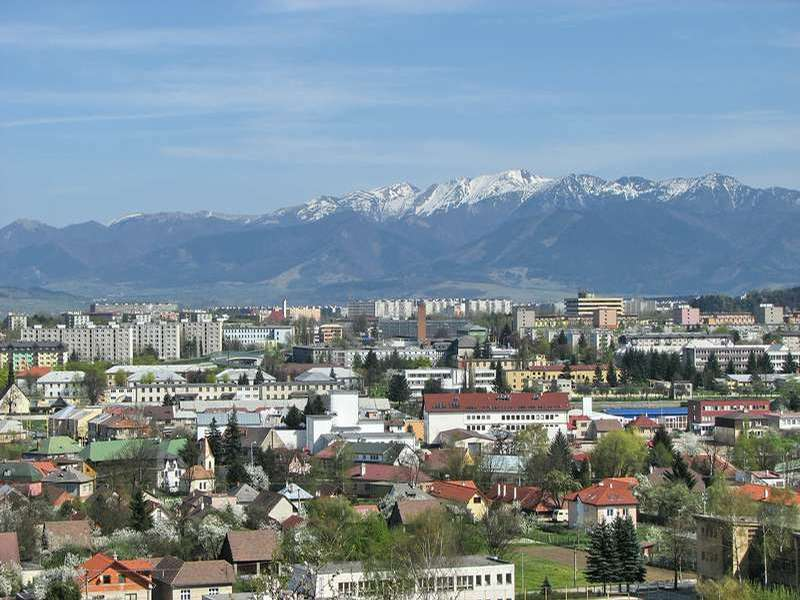
Žilina

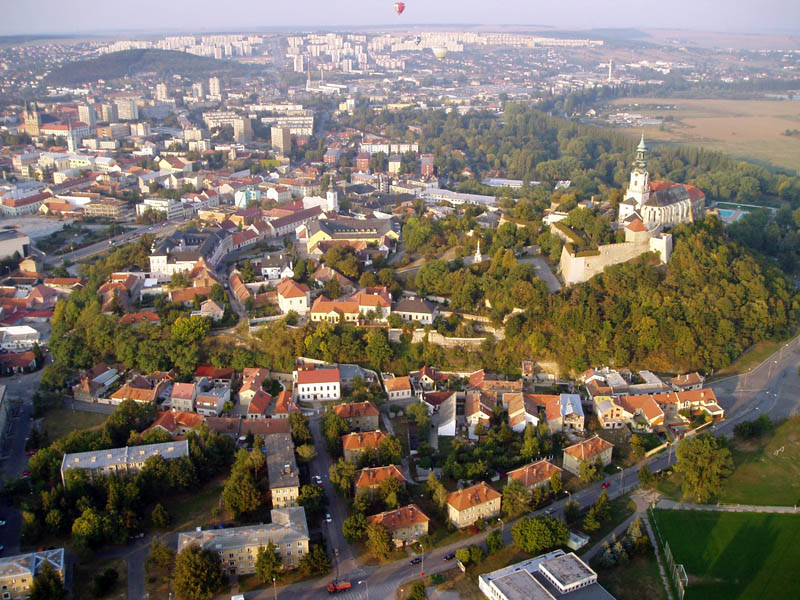
Nitra

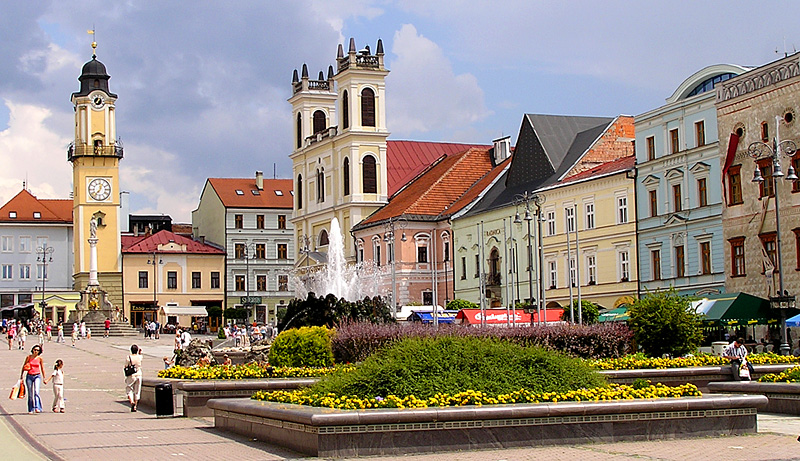
Banská Bystrica

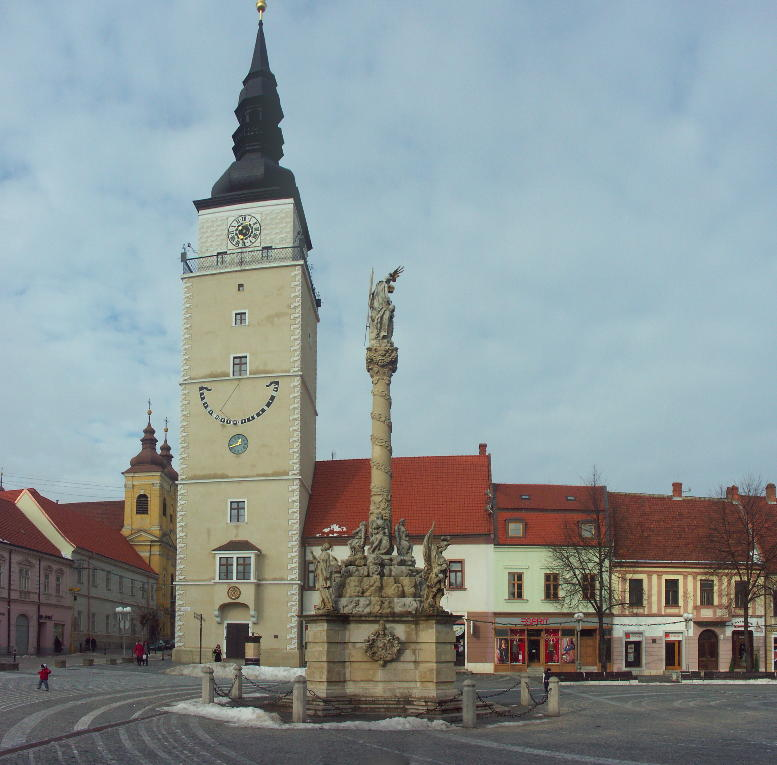
Trnava

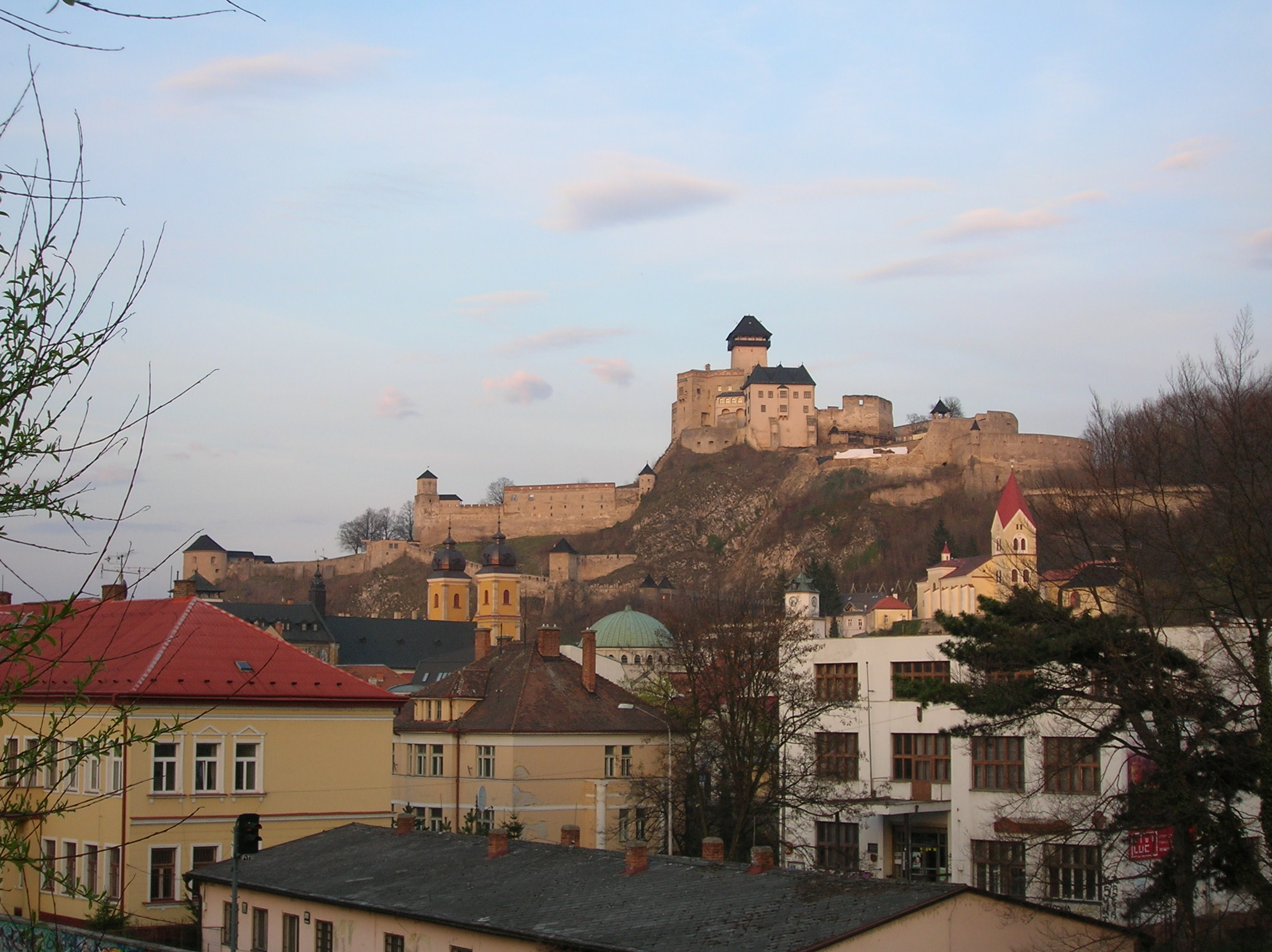
Trenčín

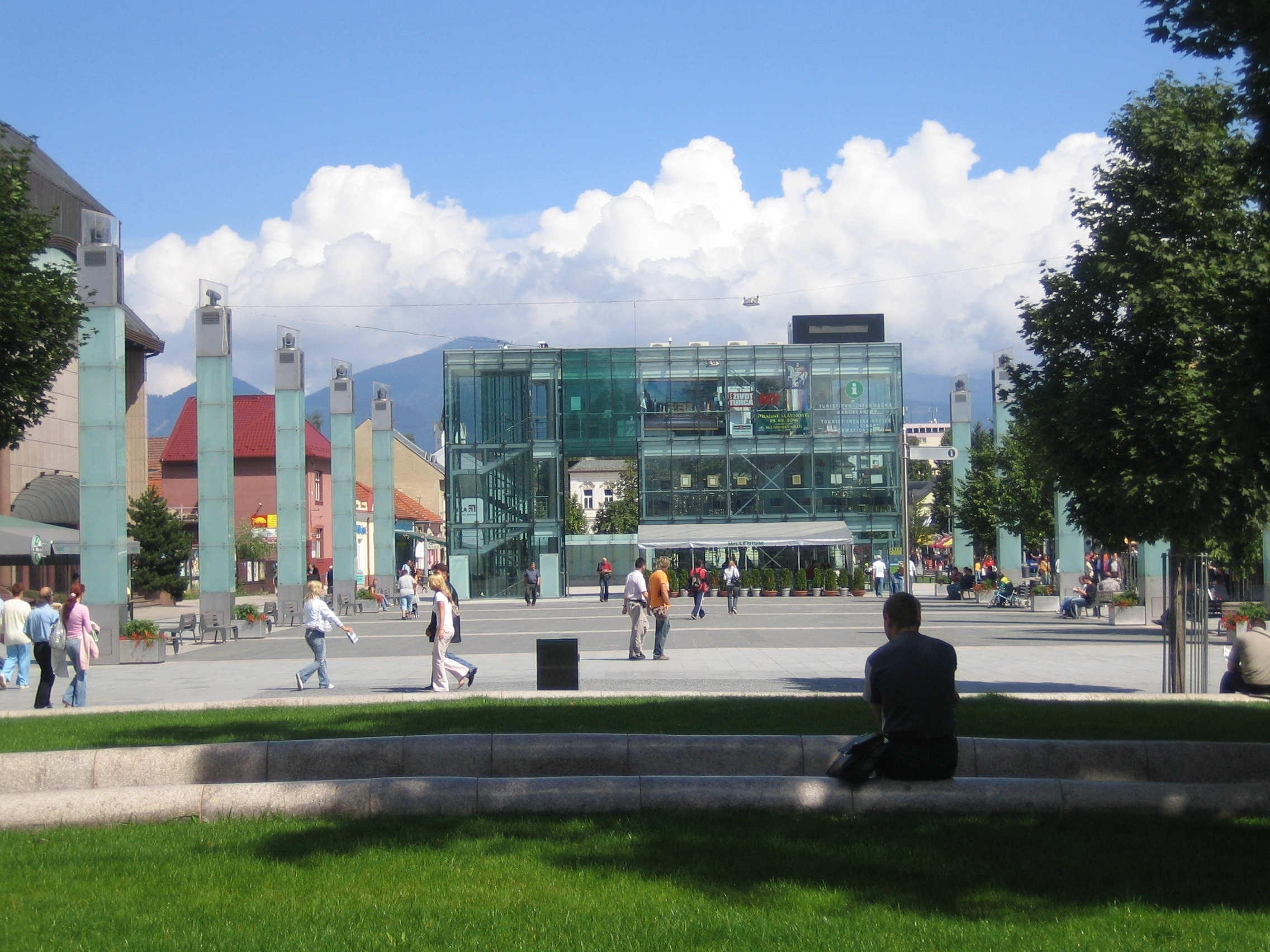
Martin

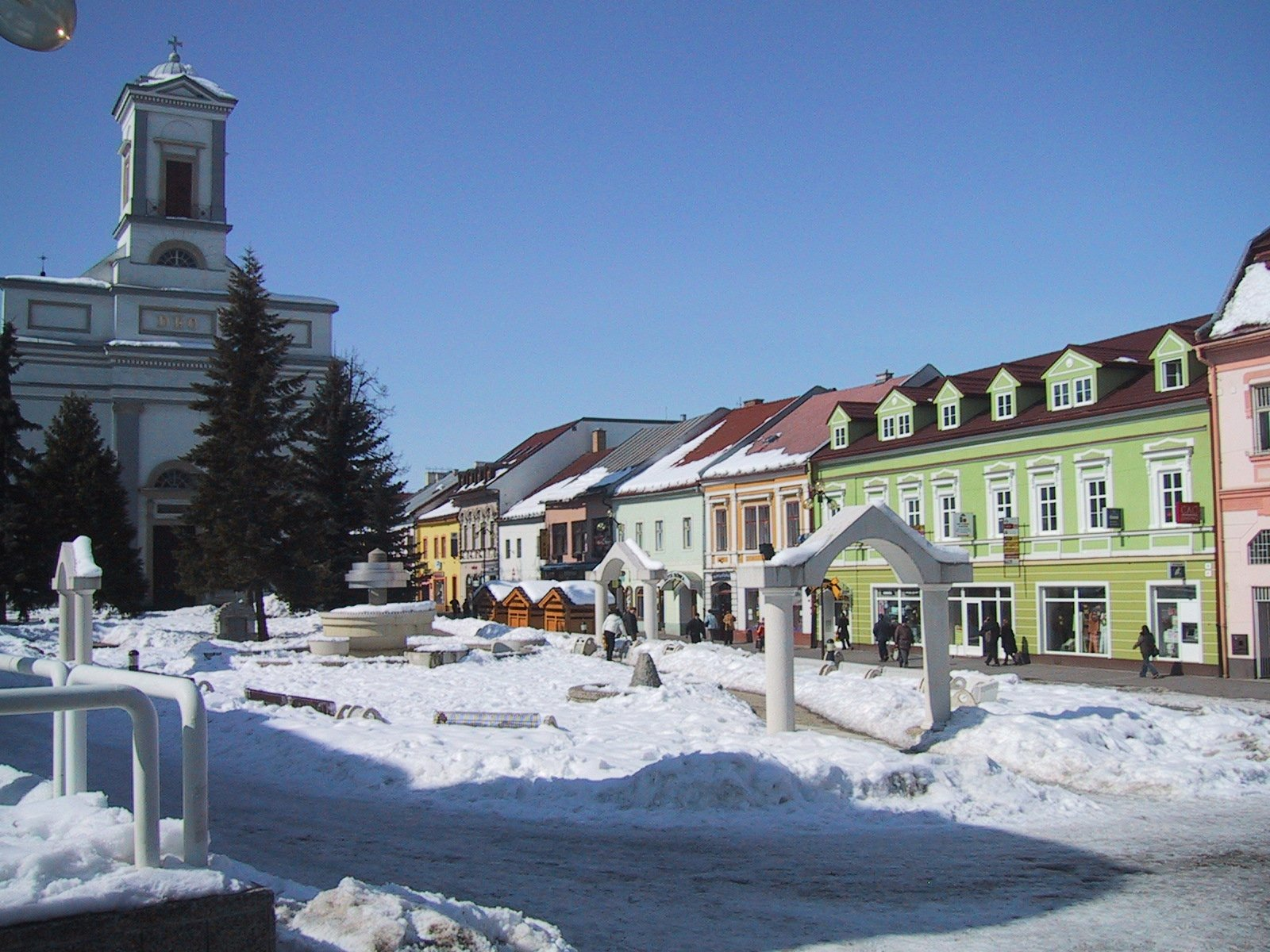
Poprad

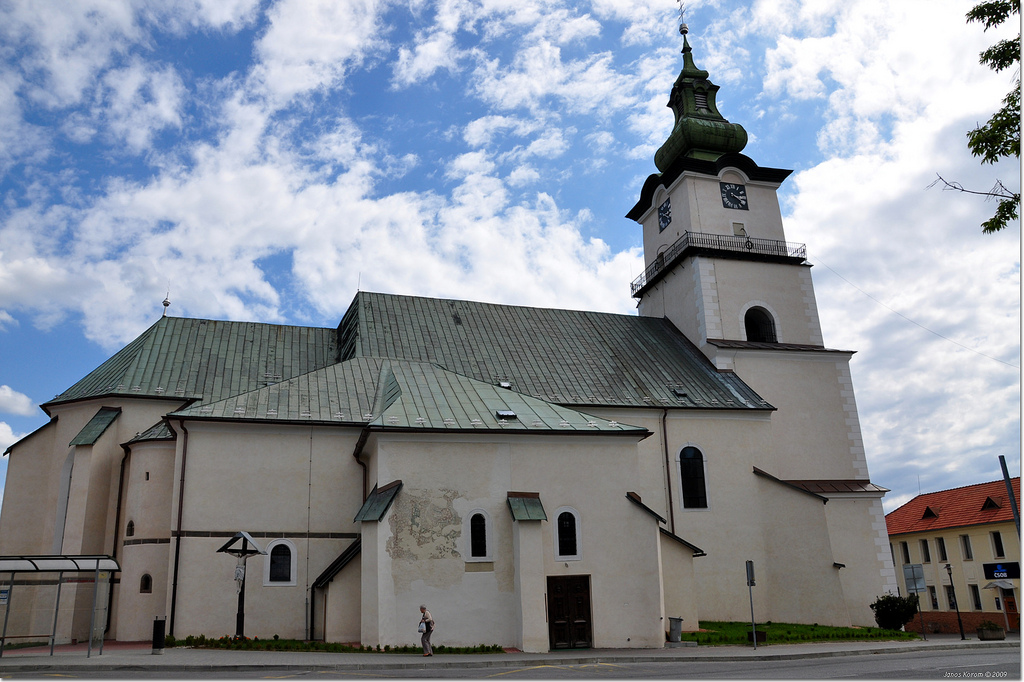
Prievidza

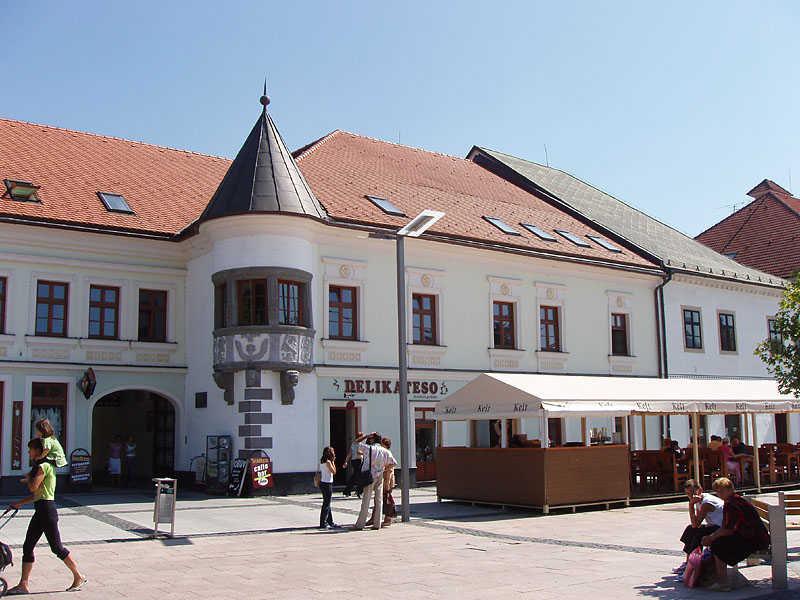
Zvolen

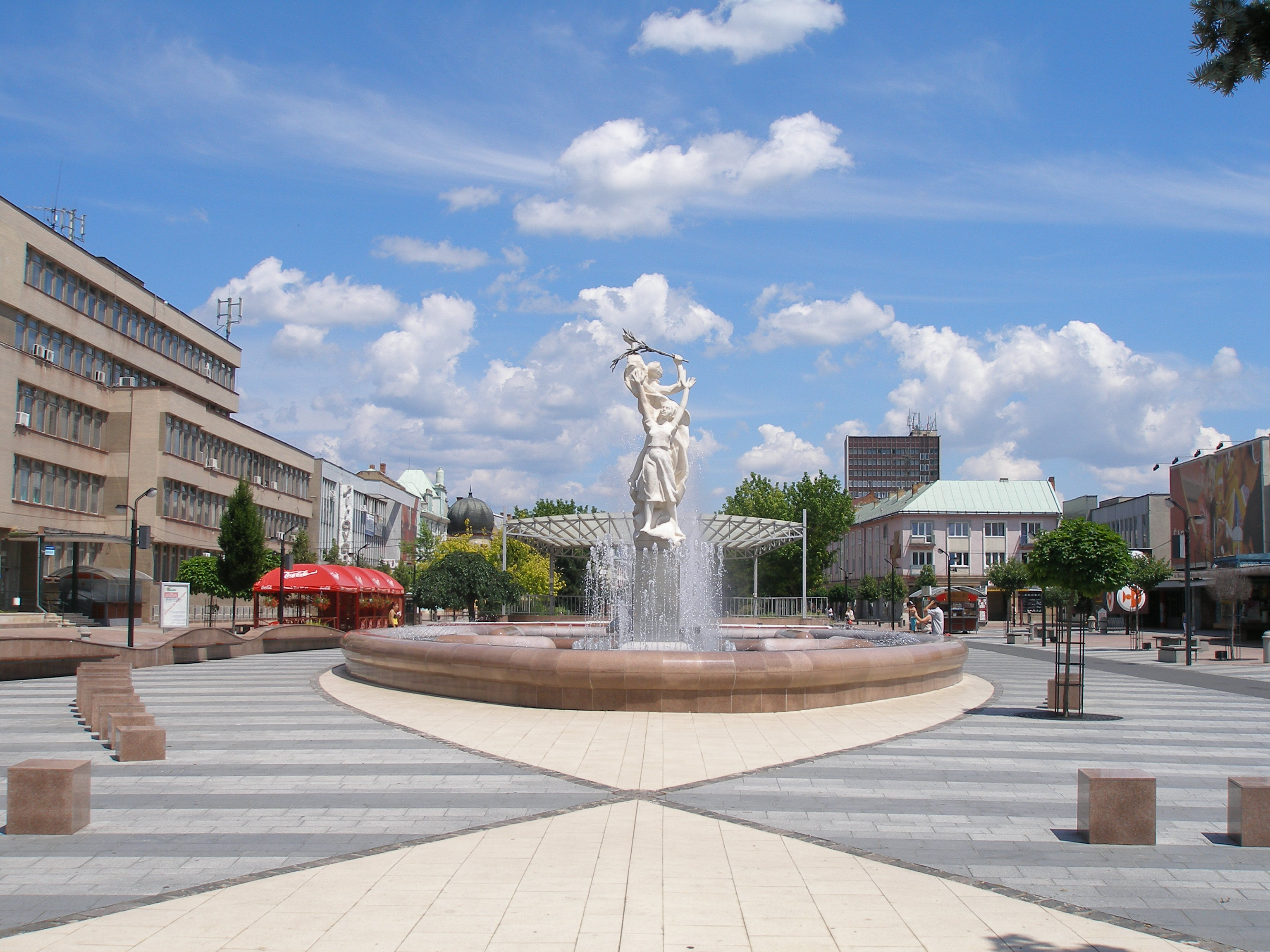
Michalovce

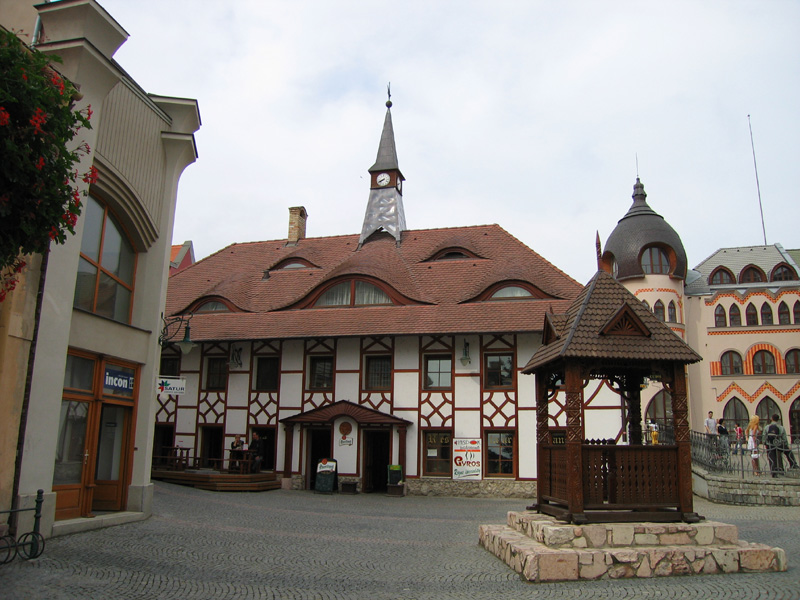
Komárno

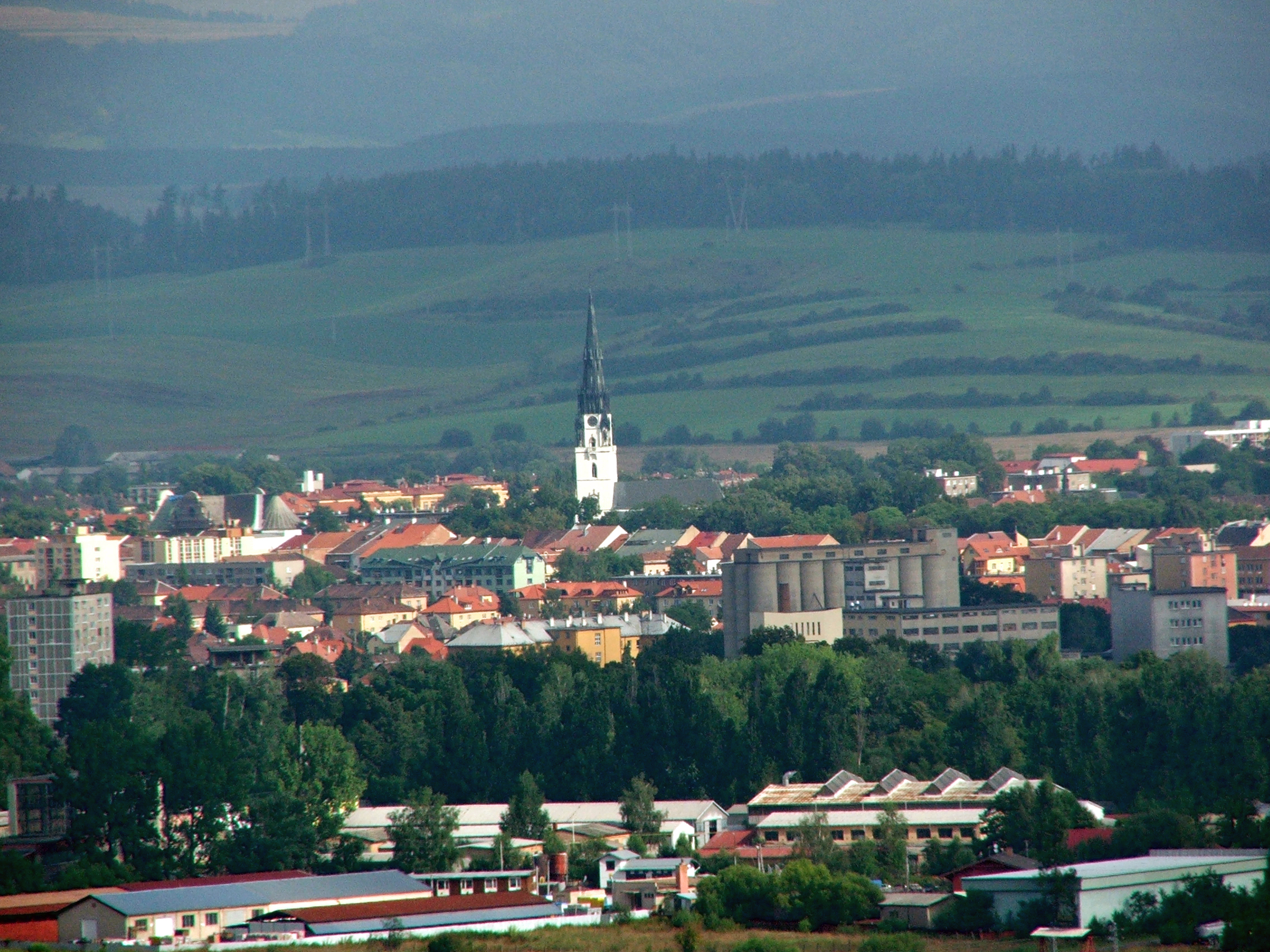
Spišská Nová Ves

Names of towns/cities
Slovak name	Hungarian name	German name
Bratislava	Pozsony	Preßburg/Pressburg
Košice	Kassa	Kaschau
Prešov	Eperjes	Eperies / Preschau
Žilina	Zsolna	Sillein
Banská Bystrica	Besztercebánya	Neusohl
Nitra	Nyitra	Neutra
Trnava	Nagyszombat	Tyrnau
Trenčín	Trencsén	Trentschin
Martin	Turócszentmárton	(Turz-) St. Martin
Poprad	Poprád	Deutschendorf
Prievidza	Privigye	Priwitz
Zvolen	Zólyom	Altsohl
Považská Bystrica	Vágbeszterce	Waagbistritz
Michalovce	Nagymihály	Großmichel
Nové Zámky	Érsekújvár	Neuhäus[e]l
Spišská Nová Ves	Igló	(Zipser) Neudorf / Neuendorf
Komárno	Komárom	Komorn
Humenné	Homonna	Homenau
Levice	Léva	Lewenz
Bardejov	Bártfa	Bartfeld
Liptovský Mikuláš	Liptószentmiklós	Liptau - St. Nikolaus
Lučenec	Losonc	Lizenz
Piešťany	Pöstyén	Pistyan / (rarely:) Püschtin
Ružomberok	Rózsahegy	Rosenberg
Topoľčany	Nagytapolcsány	Topoltschan
Trebišov	Tőketerebes	Trebischau
Čadca	Csaca	Tschadsa (rare)
Rimavská Sobota	Rimaszombat	Großsteffelsdorf
Dubnica nad Váhom	Máriatölgyes	Dubnitz an der Waag
Pezinok	Bazin	Bösing
Dunajská Streda	Dunaszerdahely	Niedermarkt (very rare)
Vranov nad Topľou	Varannó	Frö(h)nel/Vronau an der Töpl
Partizánske	Simony	
Šaľa	Vágsellye	Schelle
Hlohovec	Galgóc	Freistadtl/Freistadt an der Waag
Brezno	Breznóbánya	Bries an der Gran
Senica	Szenice	Senitz
Nové Mesto nad Váhom	Vágújhely	Neustadt an der Waag / (rarely) Neustadtl
Senec	Szenc	Wartberg
Snina	Szinna	Snina
Rožňava	Rozsnyó	Rosenau
Žiar nad Hronom	Garamszentkereszt	Heiligenkreuz
Dolný Kubín	Alsókubin	Unterkubin
Bánovce nad Bebravou	Bán	Banowitz
Púchov	Puhó	Puchau
Malacky	Malacka	Malatzka
Handlová	Nyitrabánya	Krickerhau / Krickerhäu / Kreckerhaj
Kežmarok	Késmárk	Kesmark / Käsmark
Stará Ľubovňa	Ólubló	Altlublau
Sereď	Szered	
Kysucké Nové Mesto	Kiszucaújhely	Kis(s)utz-Neustadtl
Skalica	Szakolca	Skalitz
Galanta	Galánta	Gallandau
Levoča	Lőcse	Leutschau
Detva	Gyetva, Dettva	
Šamorín	Somorja	Sommerein
Sabinov	Kisszeben	Zeben
Revúca	Nagyrőce	Groß-Rauschenbach (rare)
Veľký Krtíš	Nagykürtös	
Stupava	Stomfa	Stampfen
Myjava	Miava	Miawa (rare)
Zlaté Moravce	Aranyosmarót	Goldmorawitz
Bytča	Nagybiccse	Großbitsch
Moldava nad Bodvou	Szepsi	Moldau (an der Bodwa)
Holíč	Holics	Weißkirchen/Holitsch
Nová Dubnica	Újtölgyes	Neudubnitz
Svidník	Felsővízköz	Oberswidnik
Fiľakovo	Fülek	Fülleck
Stropkov	Sztropkó	Stroppkau
Kolárovo	Gúta	
Štúrovo	Párkány	Parkan
Banská Štiavnica	Selmecbánya	Schemnitz
Šurany	Surány	Schuran (rare)
Tvrdošín	Turdossin	Turdoschin
Modra	Modor	Modern
Veľké Kapušany	Nagykapos	
Stará Turá	Ótura	Alt-Turn
Krompachy	Korompa	Krompach
Veľký Meder	Nagymegyer	
Vráble	Verebély	
Sečovce	Gálszécs	
Krupina	Korpona	Karpfen
Námestovo	Námesztó	
Svit	Szvit	Svit
Vrútky	Ruttka	Ruttek (rare)
Turzovka	Turzófalva	
Hriňová	Herencsvölgy	Hrinau
Hurbanovo	Ógyalla	Altdala
Hnúšťa	Nyustya	Nusten
Liptovský Hrádok	Liptóújvár	Neuhäusel in der Liptau
Kráľovský Chlmec	Királyhelmec	
Trstená	Trsztena	B[r]ingenstadt
Nová Baňa	Újbánya	Königsberg an der Gran
Šahy	Ipolyság	Eipelschlag
Tornaľa	Tornalja	
Krásno nad Kysucou	Krasznó	Crassna
Želiezovce	Zselíz	Zelis
Spišská Belá	Szepesbéla	Zipser Bela
Medzilaborce	Mezőlaborc	
Lipany	Héthárs	Siebenlinden
Nemšová	Nemsó	
Turčianske Teplice	Stubnyafürdő	Bad Stuben
Sobrance	Szobránc	Sobranz
Veľký Šariš	Nagysáros	Großscharosch
Žarnovica	Zsarnóca	Scharnowitz
Gelnica	Gölnicbánya	Göllnitz
Vrbové	Verbó	Werbau
Rajec	Rajec	Rajetz
Svätý Jur	Szentgyörgy	St.Georgen
Dobšiná	Dobsina	Dobschau
Poltár	Poltár	
Ilava	Illava	Illau (very rare)
Gabčíkovo	Bős	
Kremnica	Körmöcbánya	Kremnitz
Sládkovičovo	Diószeg	(Klein- + Groß)Diosek
Gbely	Egbell	Egbell
Nesvady	Naszvad	
Sliač	Szliács	
Šaštín-Stráže	Sasvár	Sassin/Ews
Bojnice	Bajmóc	Weinitz
Brezová pod Bradlom	Berezó	Birkenhain
Medzev	Mecenzéf	Metzenseifen
Strážske	Őrmező	Straschke
Turany	Nagyturány	
Nováky	Nyitranovák	
Trenčianske Teplice	Trencsénteplic	Trentschinteplitz
Leopoldov	Újvároska	Leopoldstadt
Tisovec	Tiszolc	Theißholz / (rarely) Theisscholz
Giraltovce	Girált	
Vysoké Tatry	Magastátra	Hohe Tatra
Spišské Podhradie	Szepesváralja	Kirchdrauf
Hanušovce nad Topľou	Tapolyhanusfalva	
Čierna nad Tisou	Tiszacsernyő	
Tlmače	Garamtolmács	
Spišské Vlachy	Szepesolaszi	Wallendorf
Jelšava	Jolsva	Eltsch
Podolínec	Podolin	Pudlein
Rajecké Teplice	Rajecfürdő	Bad Rajetz
Spišská Stará Ves	Szepesófalu	Altendorf
Modrý Kameň	Kékkő	Blauenstein
Vlčany	Vágfarkasd	
Neded	Negyed	
Dudince	Gyűgy	Dudintze

== See also ==
- List of cities and towns in Slovakia
