= List of cities and towns in Slovakia =

Below is a list of towns and cities in Slovakia, called mestá (singular mesto) in Slovak. A municipality can be granted the special status of a town (mesto) by the government, provided it meets certain conditions: a population of over 5,000, good accessibility, cultural or economic significance, and an urban character of the settlement.

As of 2026, Slovakia has 2,890 municipalities, of which 141 hold town status. For German and Hungarian names of these towns, see list of German exonyms for places in Slovakia and list of Hungarian exonyms for places in Slovakia.

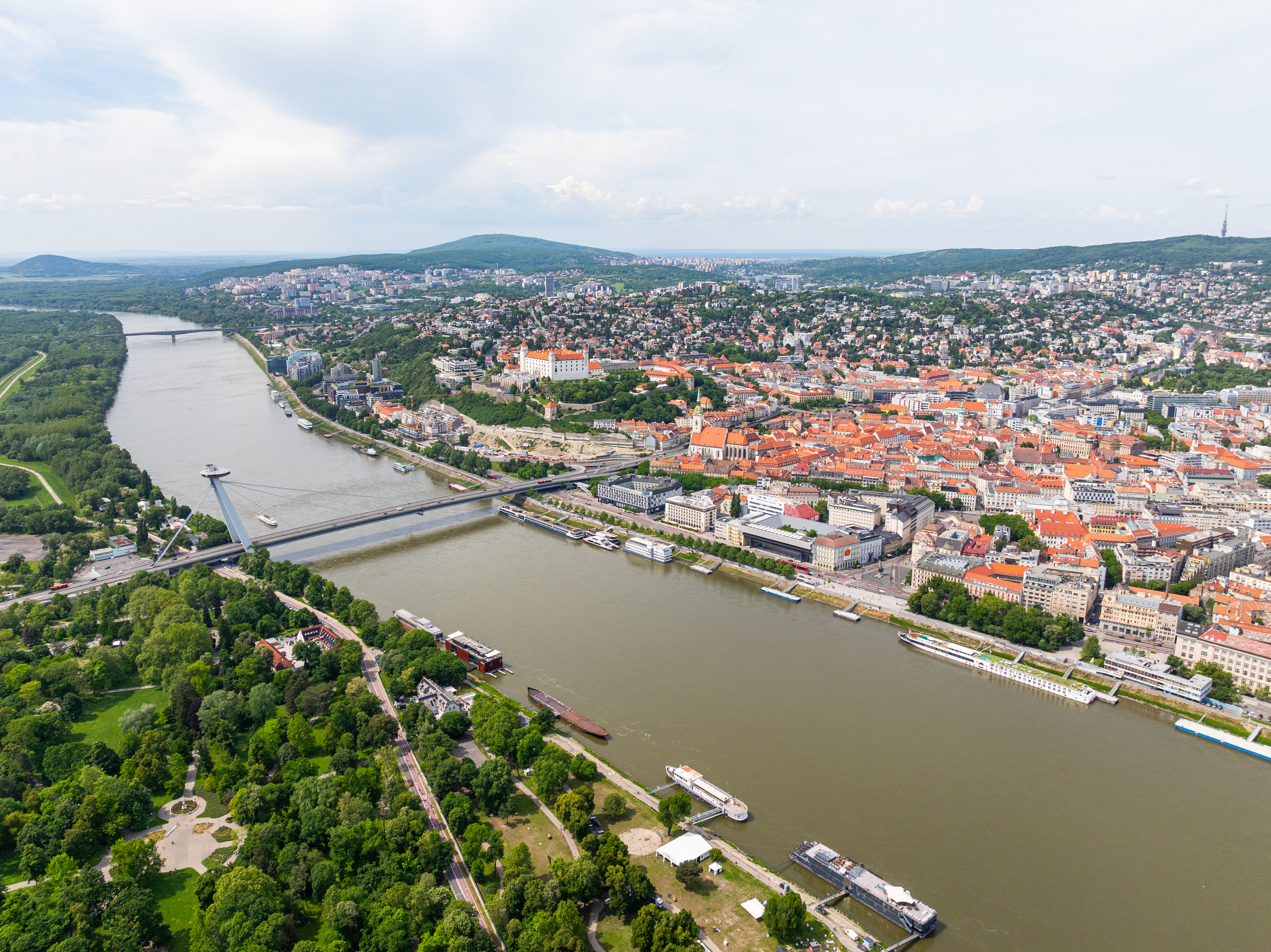
Bratislava

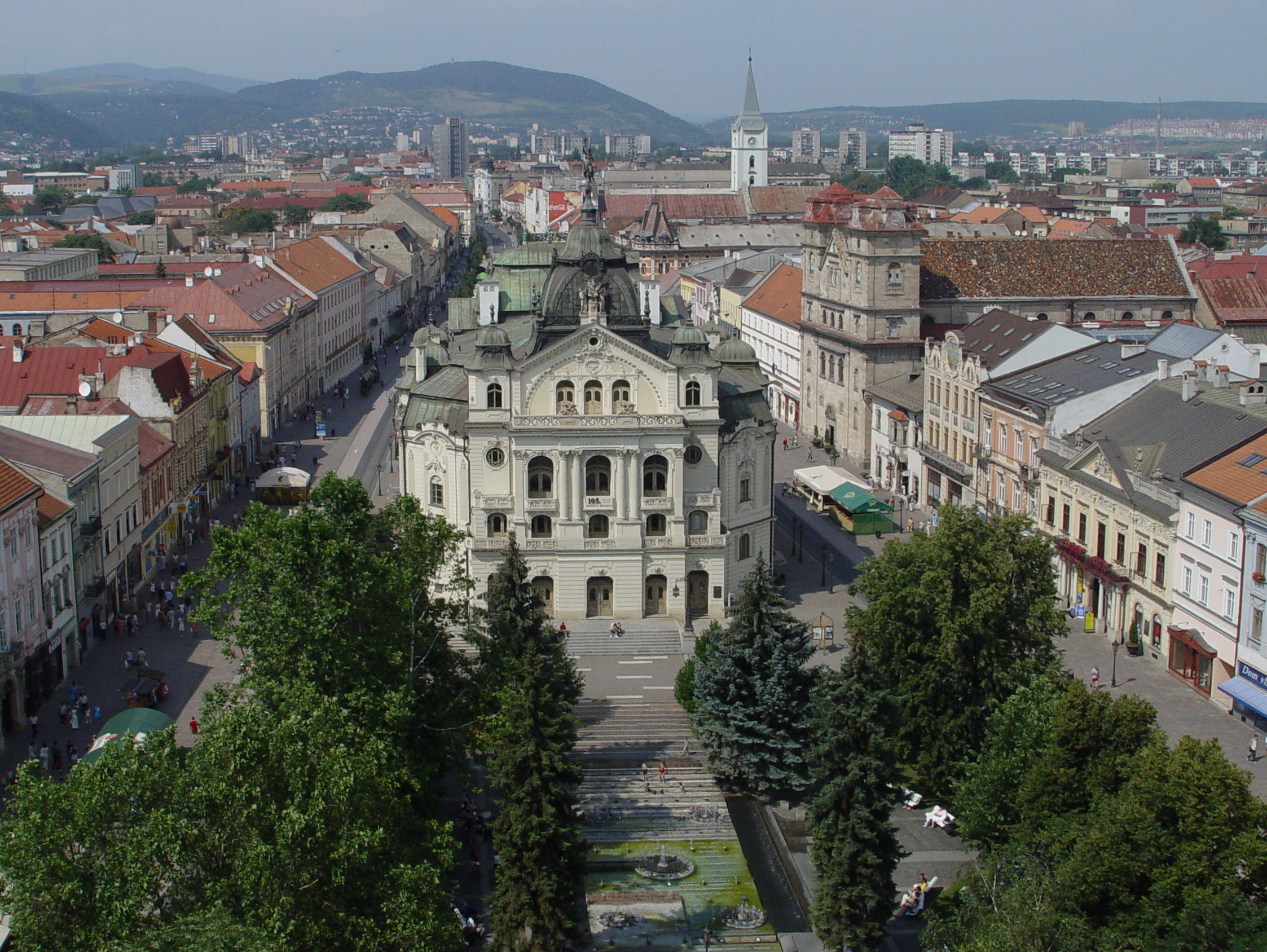
Košice

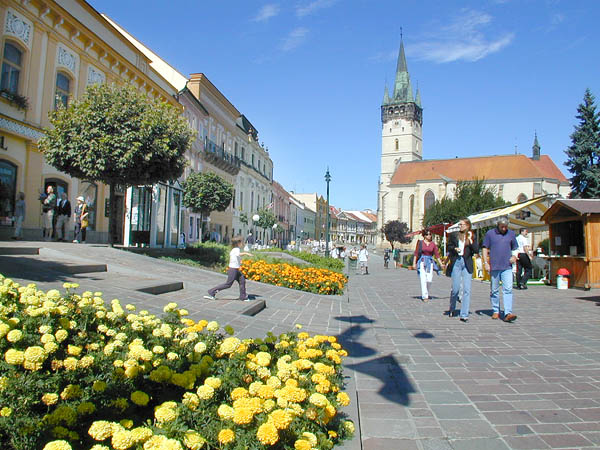
Prešov

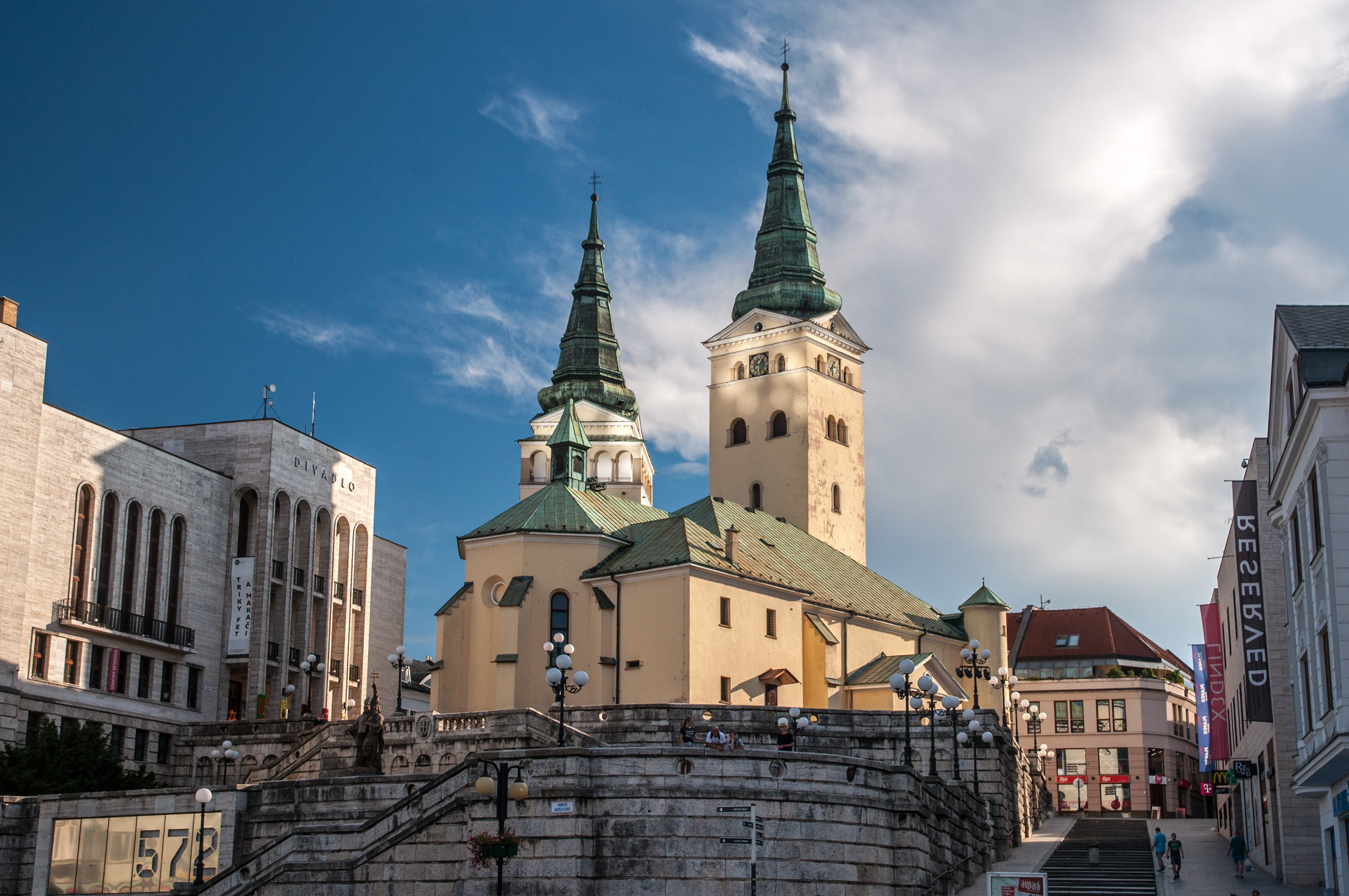
Žilina

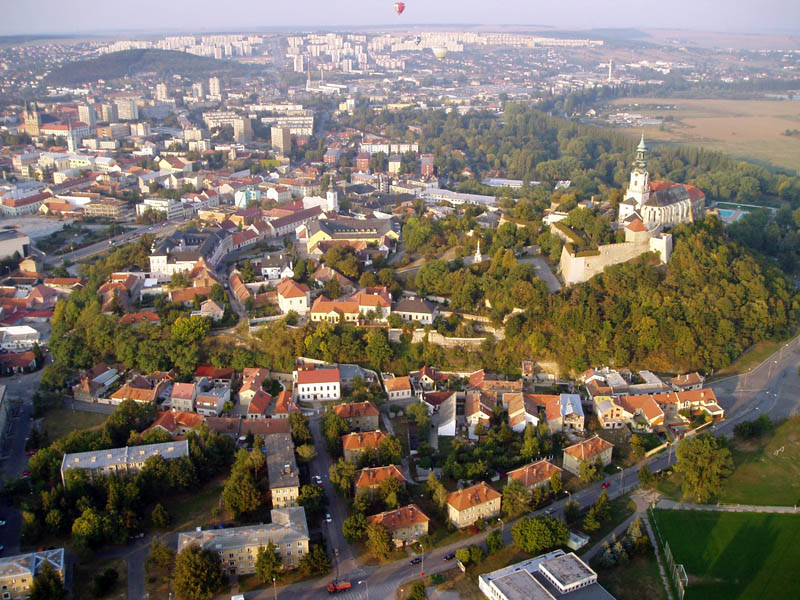
Nitra

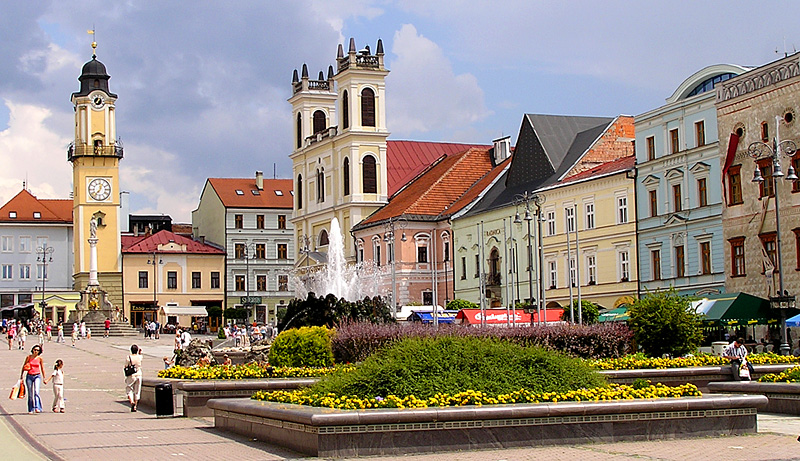
Banská Bystrica

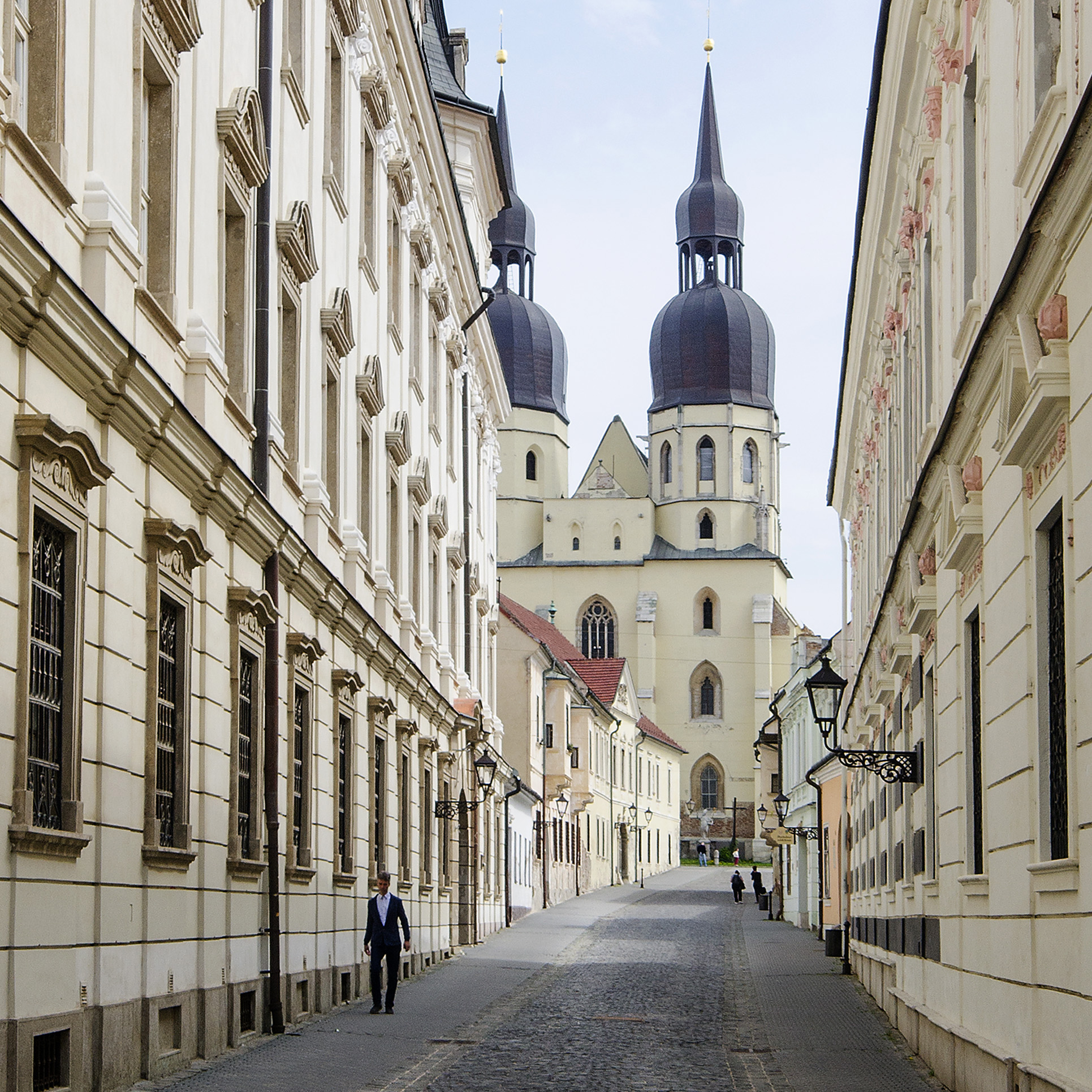
Trnava

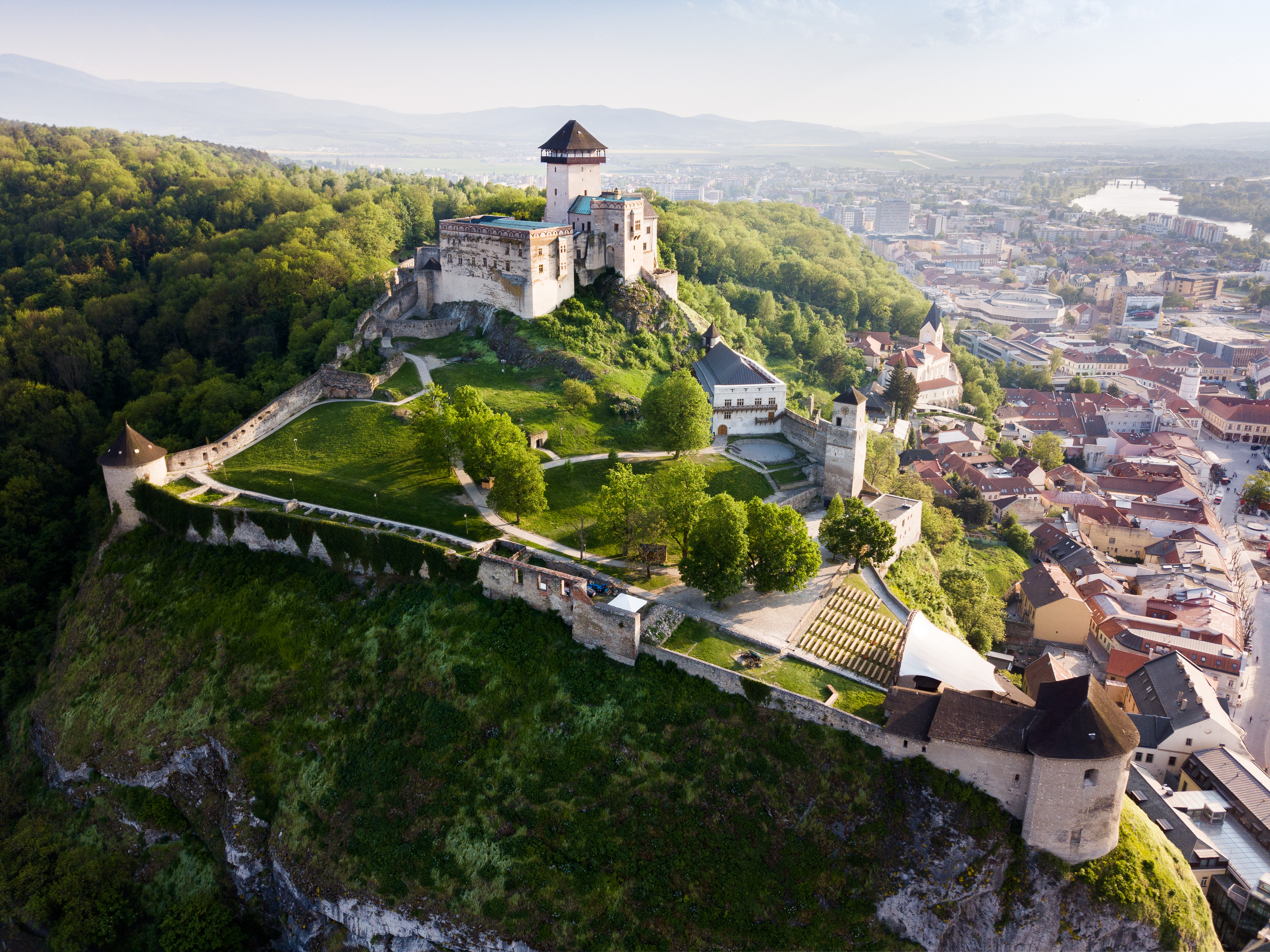
Trenčín

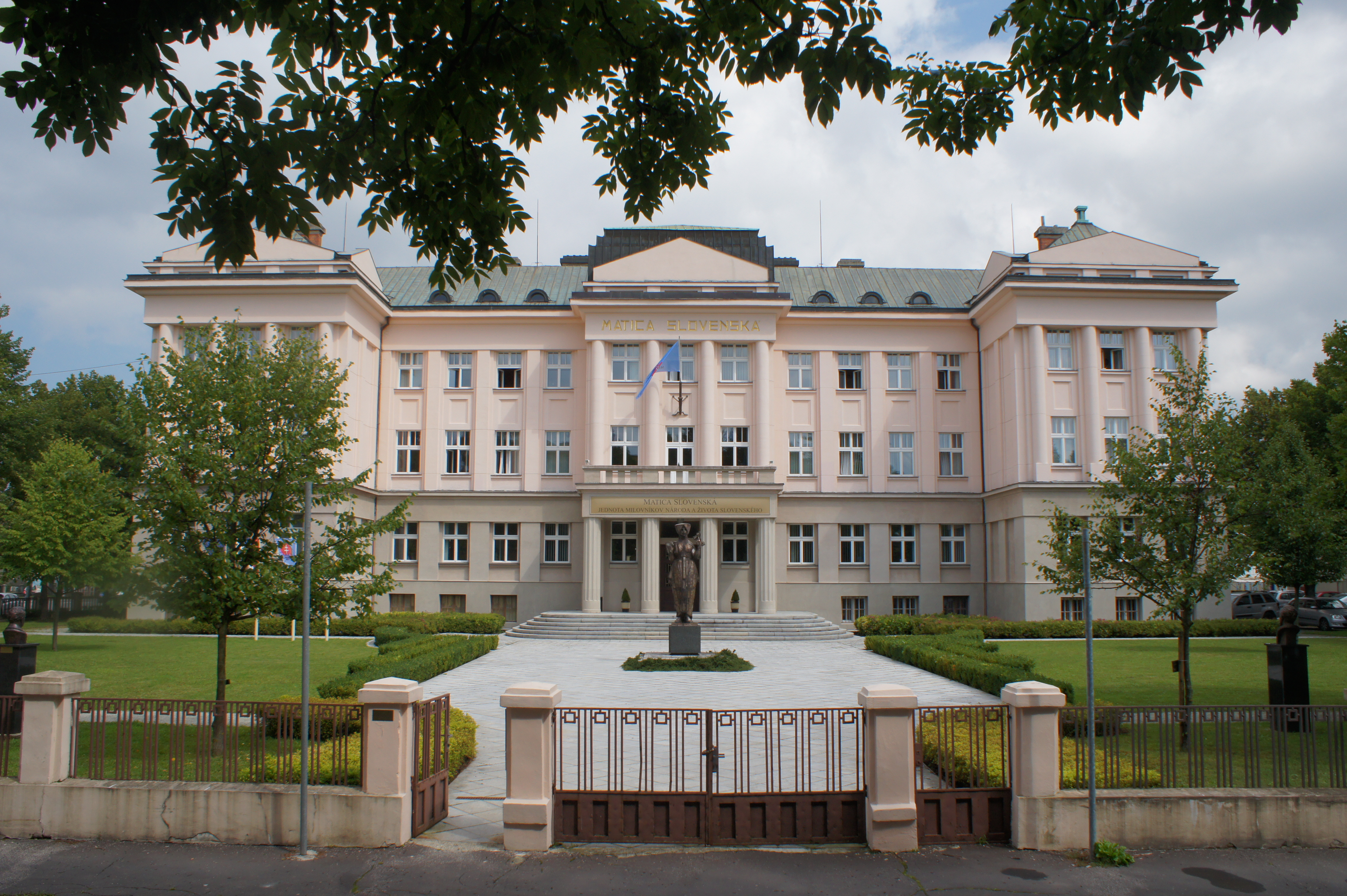
Martin

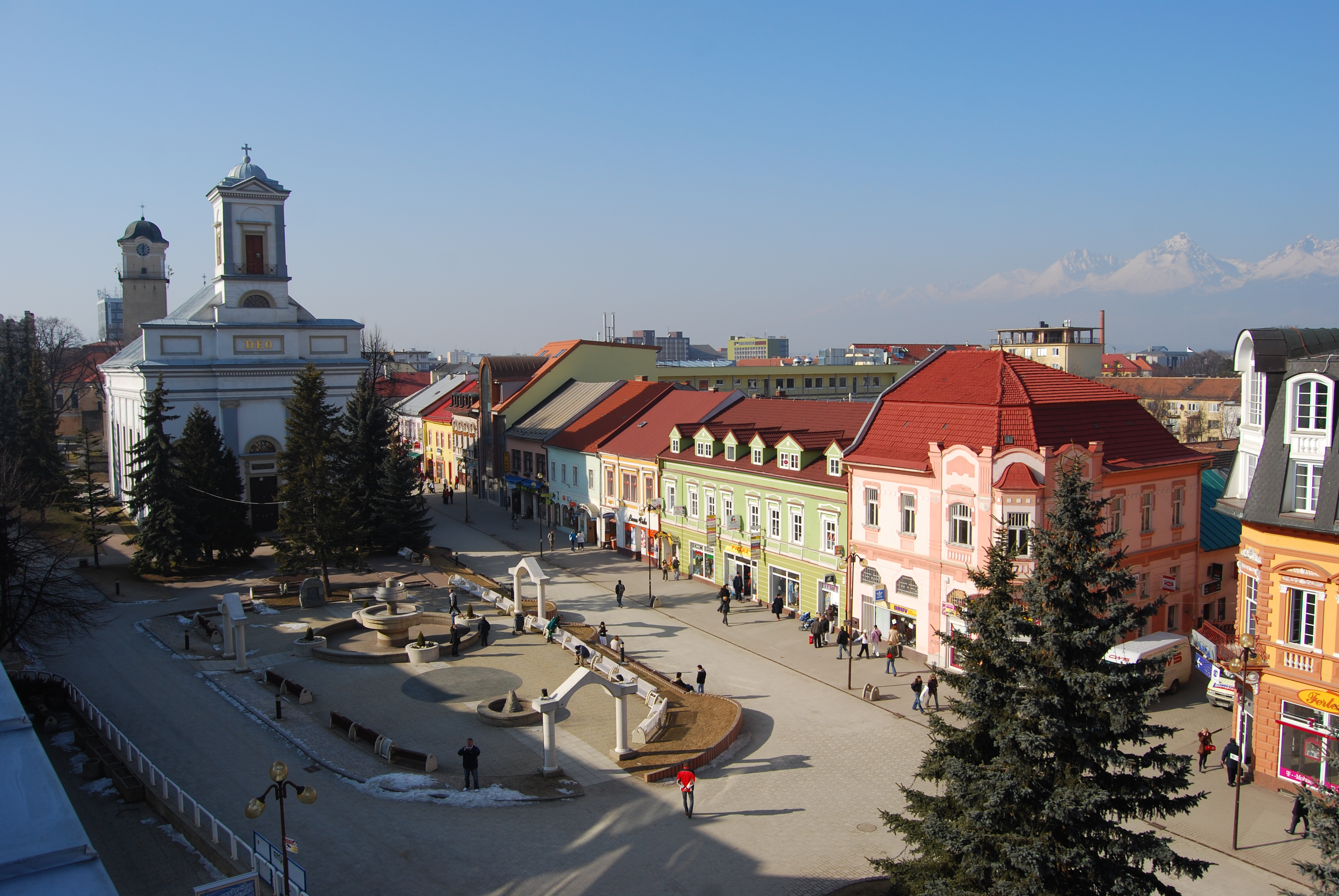
Poprad

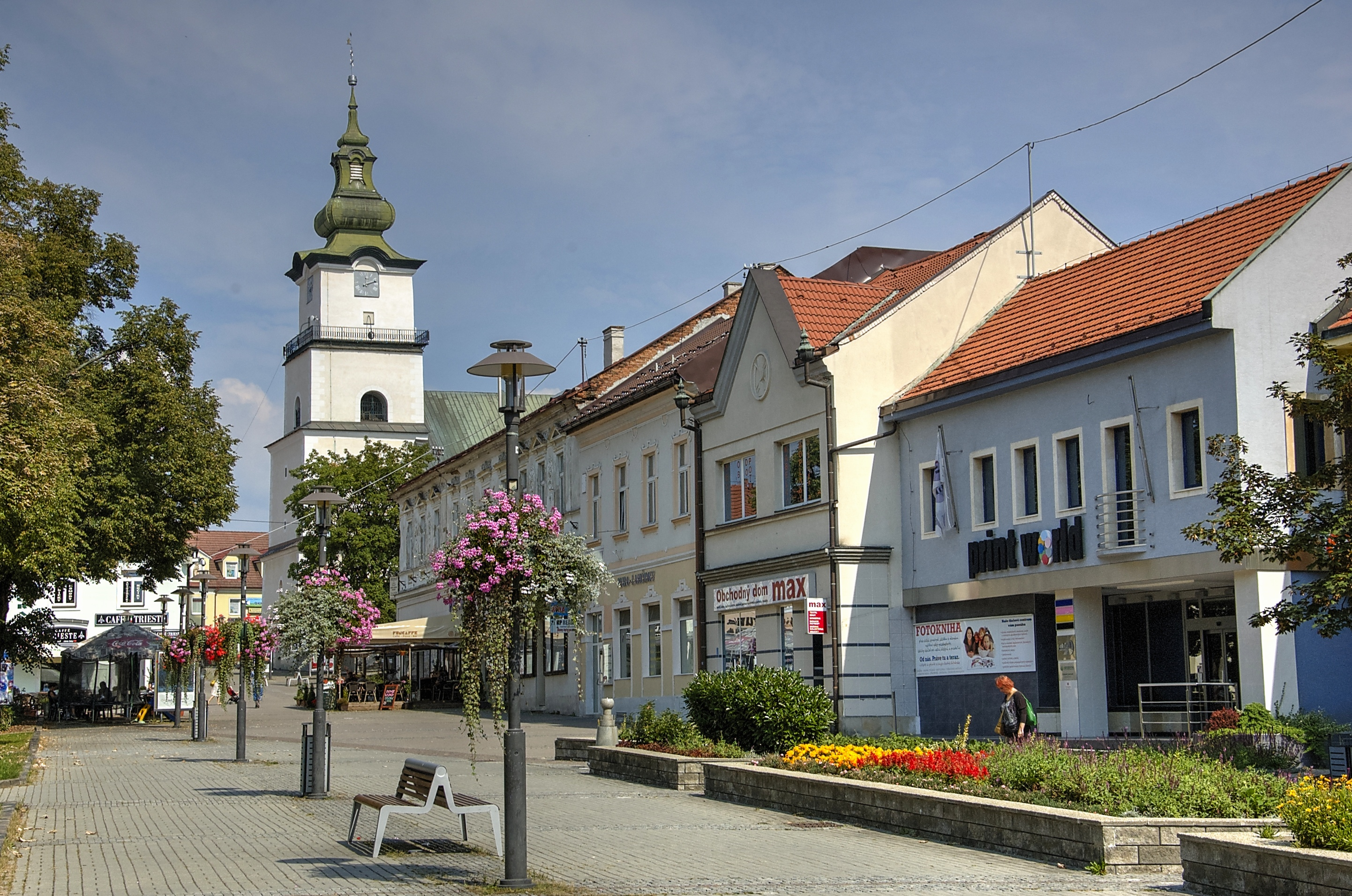
Prievidza

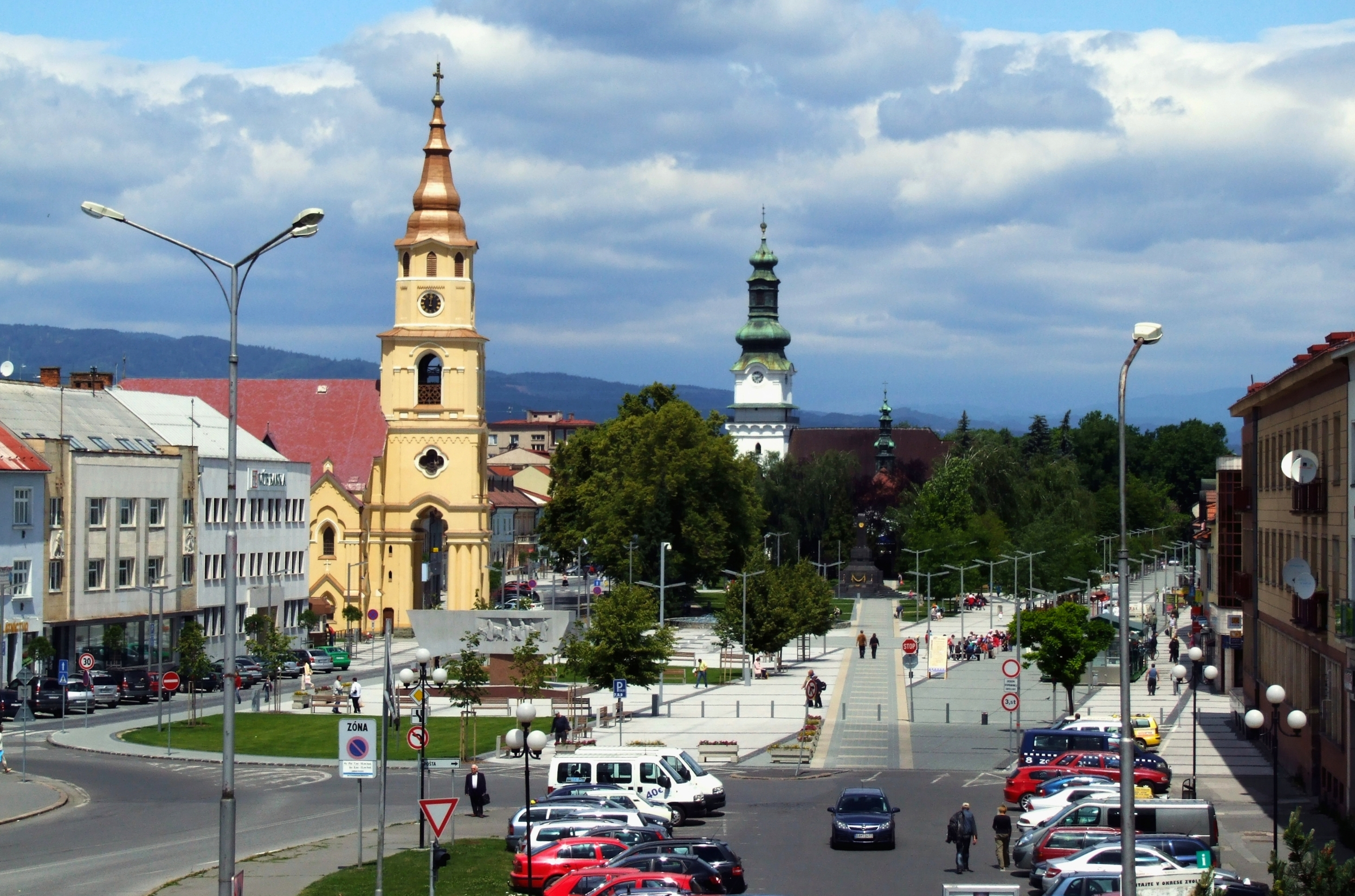
Zvolen

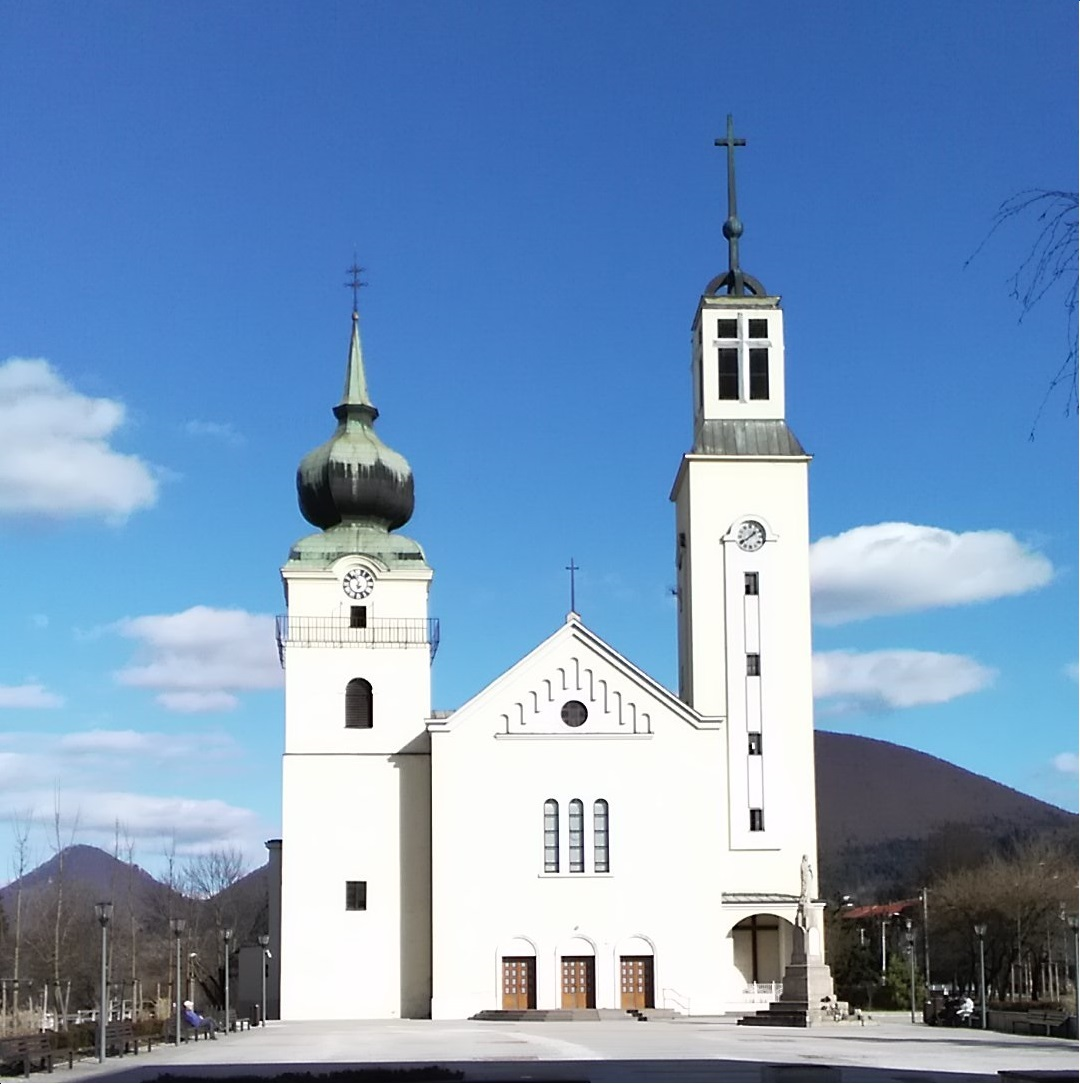
Považská Bystrica

== List of towns and cities ==
This is a list of towns and cities, sorted by population in descending order. Although mesto is variously translated into English as "town" or "city", there is no official differentiation in Slovakia.

City or town	District	Region	Population		
City or town	District	Region	2019	2001	Change
Bratislava	Bratislava I, II, III, IV, V	Bratislava Region	437,725	428,672	+2.11%
Košice	Košice I, II, III, IV	Košice Region	238,593	236,093	+1.06%
Prešov	Prešov	Prešov Region	88,464	92,786	−4.66%
Žilina	Žilina	Žilina Region	80,727	85,400	−5.47%
Banská Bystrica	Banská Bystrica	Banská Bystrica Region	78,084	83,056	−5.99%
Nitra	Nitra	Nitra Region	76,533	87,285	−12.32%
Trnava	Trnava	Trnava Region	65,033	70,286	−7.47%
Trenčín	Trenčín	Trenčín Region	55,383	57,854	−4.27%
Martin	Martin	Žilina Region	54,168	60,133	−9.92%
Poprad	Poprad	Prešov Region	51,235	56,157	−8.76%
Prievidza	Prievidza	Trenčín Region	45,634	53,097	−14.06%
Zvolen	Zvolen	Banská Bystrica Region	42,167	43,789	−3.70%
Považská Bystrica	Považská Bystrica	Trenčín Region	39,271	42,773	−8.19%
Michalovce	Michalovce	Košice Region	38,776	39,948	−2.93%
Nové Zámky	Nové Zámky	Nitra Region	37,512	42,262	−11.24%
Spišská Nová Ves	Spišská Nová Ves	Košice Region	37,007	39,193	−5.58%
Komárno	Komárno	Nitra Region	33,751	37,366	−9.67%
Humenné	Humenné	Prešov Region	32,834	35,157	−6.61%
Levice	Levice	Nitra Region	32,735	36,538	−10.41%
Bardejov	Bardejov	Prešov Region	32,293	33,247	−2.87%
Liptovský Mikuláš	Liptovský Mikuláš	Žilina Region	31,000	33,007	−6.08%
Lučenec	Lučenec	Banská Bystrica Region	27,739	28,332	−2.09%
Piešťany	Piešťany	Trnava Region	27,336	30,606	−10.68%
Ružomberok	Ružomberok	Žilina Region	26,558	30,417	−12.69%
Topoľčany	Topoľčany	Nitra Region	24,785	28,968	−14.44%
Trebišov	Trebišov	Košice Region	24,649	22,432	+9.88%
Čadca	Čadca	Žilina Region	23,941	26,699	−10.33%
Rimavská Sobota	Rimavská Sobota	Banská Bystrica Region	23,751	25,088	−5.33%
Dubnica nad Váhom	Ilava	Trenčín Region	23,550	25,995	−9.41%
Pezinok	Pezinok	Bratislava Region	23,034	21,082	+9.26%
Dunajská Streda	Dunajská Streda	Trnava Region	22,684	23,519	−3.55%
Partizánske	Partizánske	Trenčín Region	22,269	24,907	−10.59%
Vranov nad Topľou	Vranov nad Topľou	Prešov Region	22,245	22,985	−3.22%
Šaľa	Šaľa	Nitra Region	21,689	24,564	−11.70%
Hlohovec	Hlohovec	Trnava Region	21,301	23,729	−10.23%
Brezno	Brezno	Banská Bystrica Region	20,889	22,875	−8.68%
Senica	Senica	Trnava Region	20,289	21,253	−4.54%
Snina	Snina	Prešov Region	20,289	21,325	−4.86%
Nové Mesto nad Váhom	Nové Mesto nad Váhom	Trenčín Region	20,071	21,327	−5.89%
Senec	Senec	Bratislava Region	19,963	14,673	+36.05%
Rožňava	Rožňava	Košice Region	19,045	19,261	−1.12%
Žiar nad Hronom	Žiar nad Hronom	Banská Bystrica Region	18,852	19,945	−5.48%
Dolný Kubín	Dolný Kubín	Žilina Region	18,665	19,948	−6.43%
Bánovce nad Bebravou	Bánovce nad Bebravou	Trenčín Region	17,750	20,901	−15.08%
Púchov	Púchov	Trenčín Region	17,561	18,833	−6.75%
Malacky	Malacky	Bratislava Region	17,467	17,773	−1.72%
Handlová	Prievidza	Trenčín Region	16,890	18,018	−6.26%
Kežmarok	Kežmarok	Prešov Region	16,346	17,383	−5.97%
Stará Ľubovňa	Stará Ľubovňa	Prešov Region	16,327	16,227	+0.62%
Sereď	Galanta	Trnava Region	15,444	17,406	−11.27%
Skalica	Skalica	Trnava Region	15,022	15,013	+0.06%
Galanta	Galanta	Trnava Region	14,990	16,365	−8.40%
Kysucké Nové Mesto	Kysucké Nové Mesto	Žilina Region	14,953	16,558	−9.69%
Levoča	Levoča	Prešov Region	14,722	14,366	+2.48%
Detva	Detva	Banská Bystrica Region	14,545	15,122	−3.82%
Šamorín	Dunajská Streda	Trnava Region	13,350	12,143	+9.94%
Sabinov	Sabinov	Prešov Region	12,700	12,290	+3.34%
Stupava	Malacky	Bratislava Region	12,108	8,063	+50.17%
Revúca	Revúca	Banská Bystrica Region	11,949	13,466	−11.27%
Veľký Krtíš	Veľký Krtíš	Banská Bystrica Region	11,755	14,013	−16.11%
Myjava	Myjava	Trenčín Region	11,514	13,142	−12.39%
Zlaté Moravce	Zlaté Moravce	Nitra Region	11,375	15,618	−27.17%
Bytča	Bytča	Žilina Region	11,363	11,550	−1.62%
Moldava nad Bodvou	Košice-okolie	Košice Region	11,307	9,525	+18.71%
Holíč	Skalica	Trnava Region	11,156	11,416	−2.28%
Nová Dubnica	Ilava	Trenčín Region	11,040	12,358	−10.67%
Svidník	Svidník	Prešov Region	10,752	12,428	−13.49%
Kolárovo	Komárno	Nitra Region	10,586	10,823	−2.19%
Fiľakovo	Lučenec	Banská Bystrica Region	10,568	10,198	+3.63%
Stropkov	Stropkov	Prešov Region	10,438	10,874	−4.01%
Štúrovo	Nové Zámky	Nitra Region	10,186	11,708	−13.00%
Banská Štiavnica	Banská Štiavnica	Banská Bystrica Region	10,004	10,874	−8.00%
Šurany	Nové Zámky	Nitra Region	9,659	10,491	−7.93%
Tvrdošín	Tvrdošín	Žilina Region	9,201	9,544	−3.59%
Modra	Pezinok	Bratislava Region	9,046	8,536	+5.97%
Veľké Kapušany	Michalovce	Košice Region	8,862	9,760	−9.20%
Stará Turá	Nové Mesto nad Váhom	Trenčín Region	8,764	10,291	−14.84%
Krompachy	Spišská Nová Ves	Košice Region	8,684	8,812	−1.45%
Veľký Meder	Dunajská Streda	Trnava Region	8,612	9,113	−5.50%
Vráble	Nitra	Nitra Region	8,551	9,493	−9.92%
Sečovce	Trebišov	Košice Region	8,542	7,819	+9.25%
Svit	Poprad	Prešov Region	7,923	7,445	+6.42%
Krupina	Krupina	Banská Bystrica Region	7,912	7,991	−0.99%
Námestovo	Námestovo	Žilina Region	7,784	8,135	−4.31%
Vrútky	Martin	Žilina Region	7,748	7,298	+6.17%
Turzovka	Čadca	Žilina Region	7,515	7,854	−4.32%
Kráľovský Chlmec	Trebišov	Košice Region	7,426	8,031	−7.53%
Hriňová	Detva	Banská Bystrica Region	7,415	8,289	−10.54%
Hnúšťa	Rimavská Sobota	Banská Bystrica Region	7,411	7,557	−1.93%
Hurbanovo	Komárno	Nitra Region	7,397	8,153	−9.27%
Liptovský Hrádok	Liptovský Mikuláš	Žilina Region	7,397	8,232	−10.14%
Trstená	Tvrdošín	Žilina Region	7,360	7,461	−1.35%
Nová Baňa	Žarnovica	Banská Bystrica Region	7,314	7,505	−2.54%
Šahy	Levice	Nitra Region	7,219	8,061	−10.45%
Tornaľa	Revúca	Banská Bystrica Region	7,114	8,169	−12.91%
Krásno nad Kysucou	Čadca	Žilina Region	6,799	6,939	−2.02%
Želiezovce	Levice	Nitra Region	6,746	7,522	−10.32%
Spišská Belá	Kežmarok	Prešov Region	6,733	6,136	+9.73%
Lipany	Sabinov	Prešov Region	6,542	6,130	+6.72%
Medzilaborce	Medzilaborce	Prešov Region	6,531	6,741	−3.12%
Veľký Šariš	Prešov	Prešov Region	6,426	4,018	+59.93%
Nemšová	Trenčín	Trenčín Region	6,414	6,136	+4.53%
Sobrance	Sobrance	Košice Region	6,346	6,262	+1.34%
Turčianske Teplice	Turčianske Teplice	Žilina Region	6,330	7,031	−9.97%
Žarnovica	Žarnovica	Banská Bystrica Region	6,170	6,596	−6.46%
Gelnica	Gelnica	Košice Region	6,047	6,404	−5.57%
Vrbové	Piešťany	Trnava Region	5,907	6,249	−5.47%
Rajec	Žilina	Žilina Region	5,787	6,074	−4.73%
Svätý Jur	Pezinok	Bratislava Region	5,724	4,614	+24.06%
Dobšiná	Rožňava	Košice Region	5,685	4,896	+16.12%
Poltár	Poltár	Banská Bystrica Region	5,584	6,099	−8.44%
Gabčíkovo	Dunajská Streda	Trnava Region	5,473	5,084	+7.65%
Ilava	Ilava	Trenčín Region	5,464	5,411	+0.98%
Kremnica	Žiar nad Hronom	Banská Bystrica Region	5,258	5,822	−9.69%
Sládkovičovo	Galanta	Trnava Region	5,209	6,078	−14.30%
Gbely	Skalica	Trnava Region	5,073	5,223	−2.87%
Nesvady	Komárno	Nitra Region	5,049	5,063	−0.28%
Bojnice	Prievidza	Trenčín Region	4,992	5,006	−0.28%
Šaštín-Stráže	Senica	Trnava Region	4,965	5,005	−0.80%
Sliač	Zvolen	Banská Bystrica Region	4,959	4,667	+6.26%
Brezová pod Bradlom	Myjava	Trenčín Region	4,768	5,567	−14.35%
Medzev	Košice-okolie	Košice Region	4,482	3,667	+22.23%
Turany	Martin	Žilina Region	4,278	4,444	−3.74%
Strážske	Michalovce	Košice Region	4,250	4,474	−5.01%
Nováky	Prievidza	Trenčín Region	4,203	4,402	−4.52%
Trenčianske Teplice	Trenčín	Trenčín Region	4,162	4,438	−6.22%
Leopoldov	Hlohovec	Trnava Region	4,097	3,999	+2.45%
Giraltovce	Svidník	Prešov Region	4,089	4,189	−2.39%
Tisovec	Rimavská Sobota	Banská Bystrica Region	4,087	4,215	−3.04%
Vysoké Tatry	Poprad	Prešov Region	4,009	5,407	−25.86%
Spišské Podhradie	Levoča	Prešov Region	3,985	3,780	+5.42%
Hanušovce nad Topľou	Vranov nad Topľou	Prešov Region	3,782	3,582	+5.58%
Čierna nad Tisou	Trebišov	Košice Region	3,619	4,645	−22.09%
Tlmače	Levice	Nitra Region	3,520	4,305	−18.23%
Spišské Vlachy	Spišská Nová Ves	Košice Region	3,459	3,518	−1.68%
Jelšava	Revúca	Banská Bystrica Region	3,289	3,287	+0.06%
Podolínec	Stará Ľubovňa	Prešov Region	3,155	3,173	−0.57%
Rajecké Teplice	Žilina	Žilina Region	3,023	2,677	+12.92%
Spišská Stará Ves	Kežmarok	Prešov Region	2,230	2,355	−5.31%
Modrý Kameň	Veľký Krtíš	Banská Bystrica Region	1,624	1,434	+13.25%
Dudince	Krupina	Banská Bystrica Region	1,395	1,500	−7.00%

== See also ==
- Lists of cities
