= List of German names for places in Slovakia =

Below is a list of cities and towns in Slovakia, showing their German name. German is a minority language in Slovakia. The note Empire of Austria means that a post office - in the Kingdom of Hungary - used the German name before 1867.

== Complete list ==
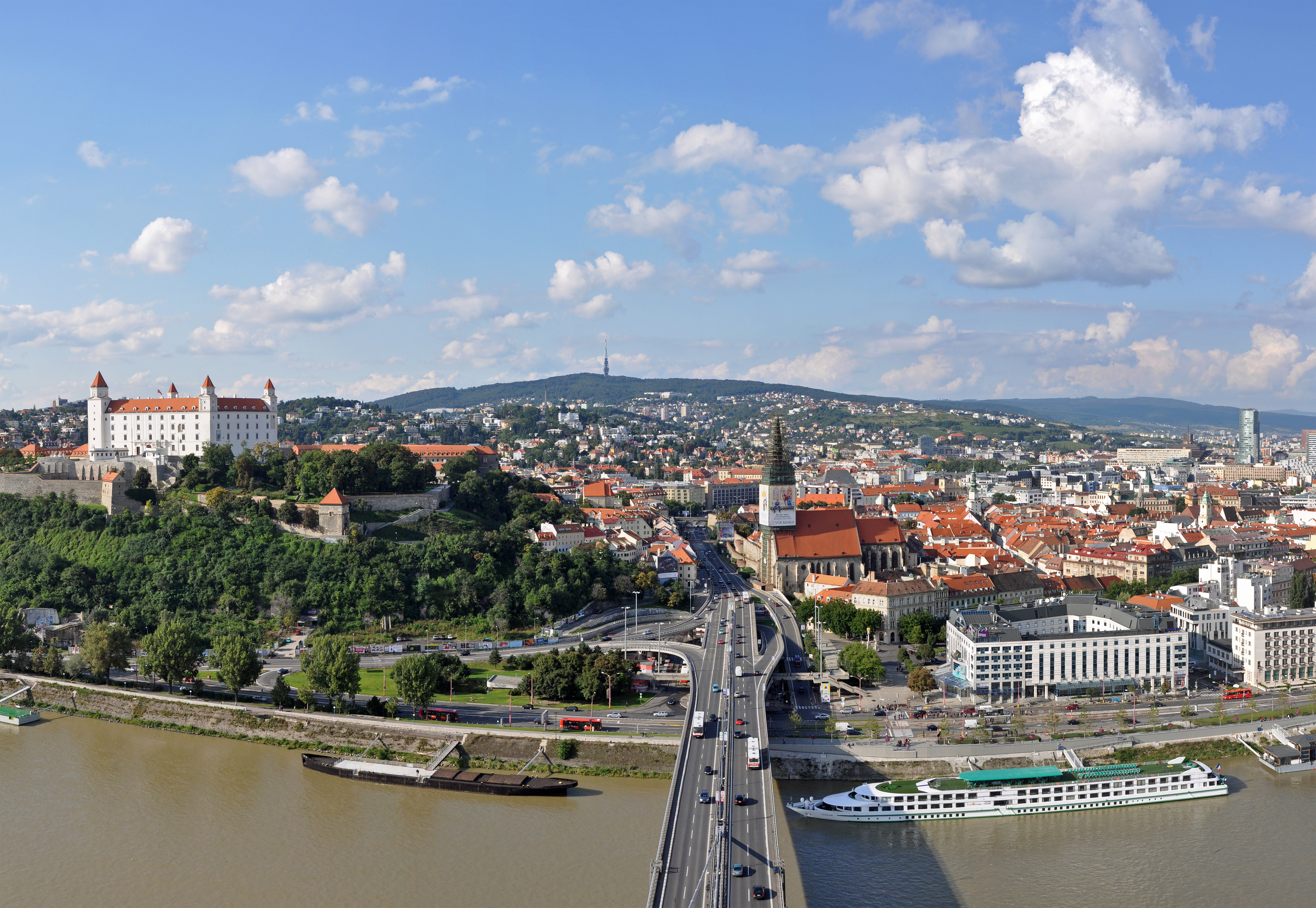
Bratislava

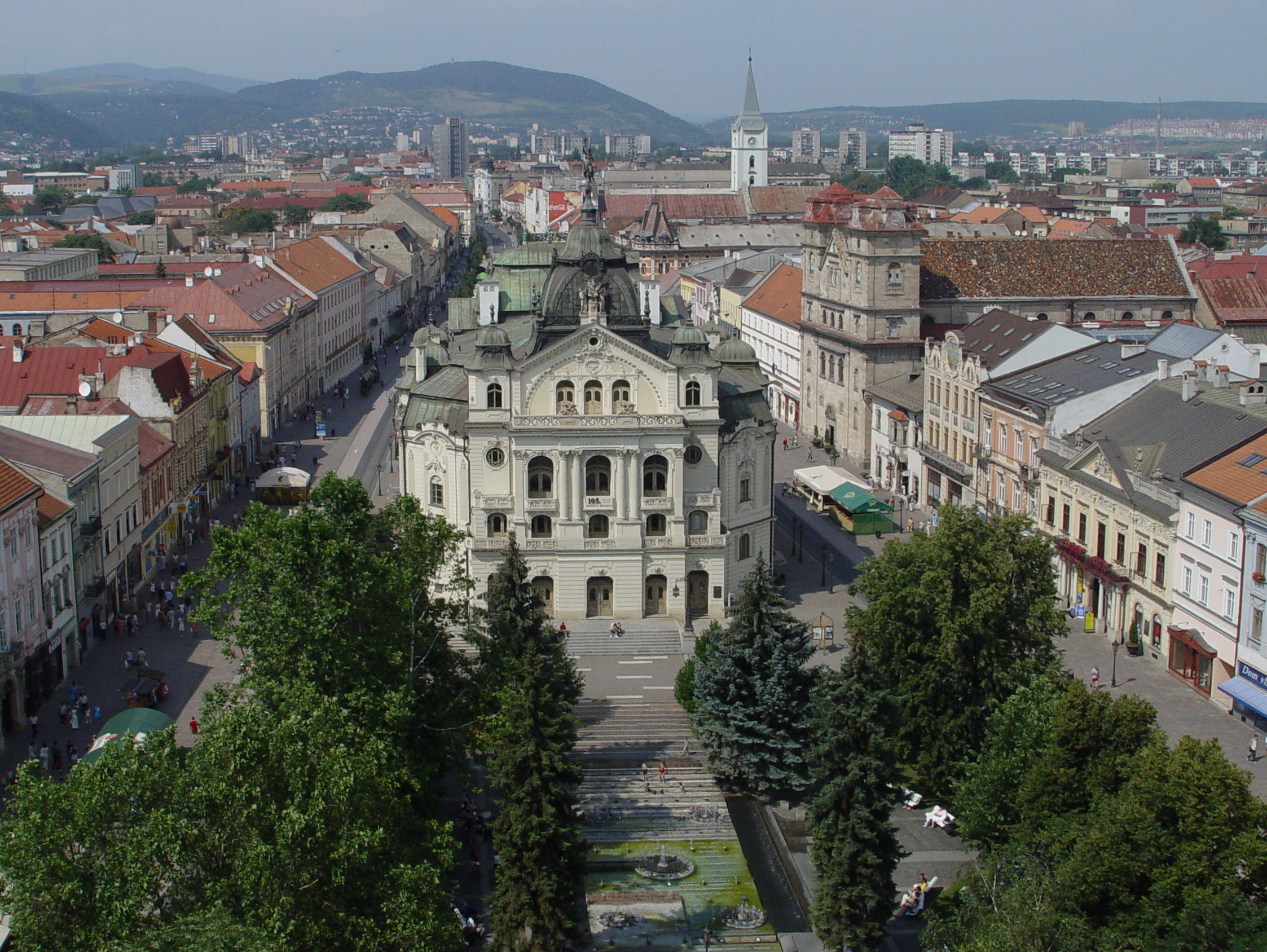
Košice

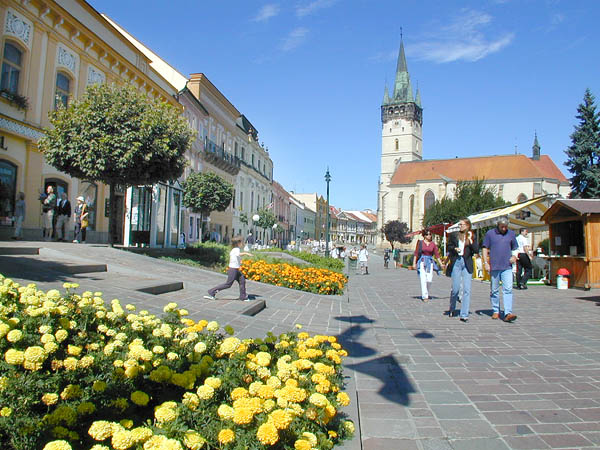
Prešov

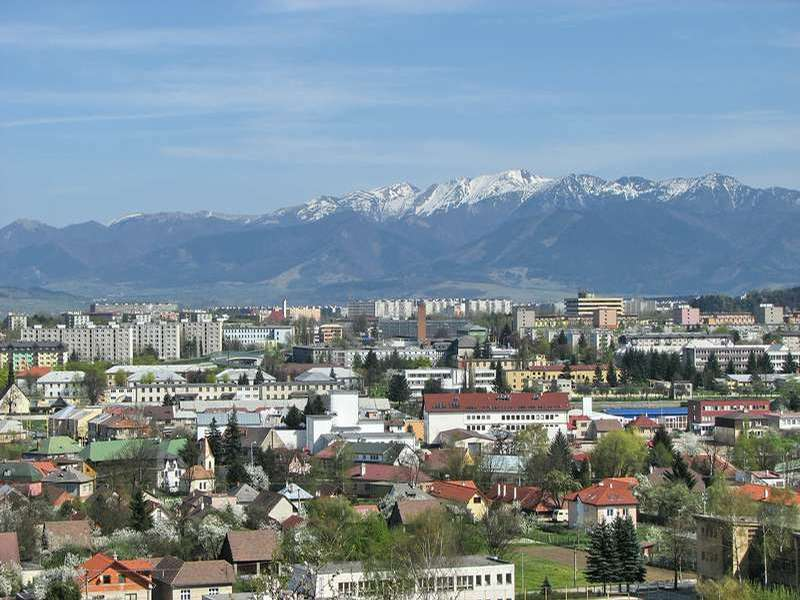
Žilina

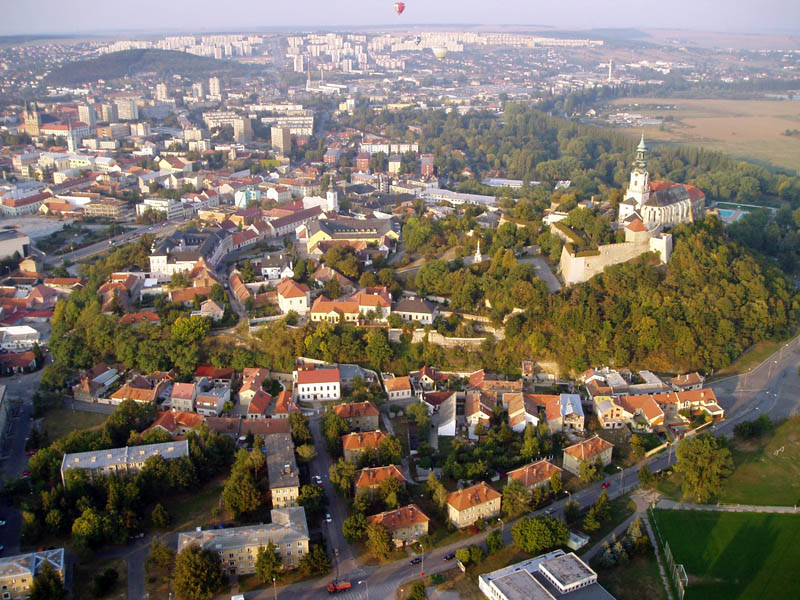
Nitra

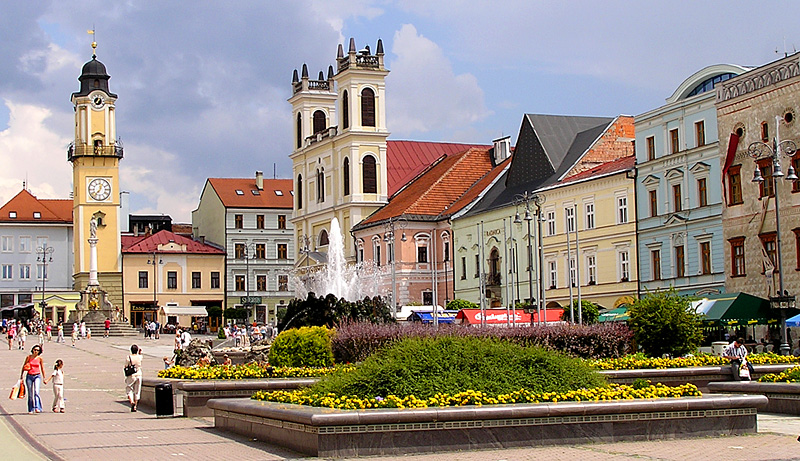
Banská Bystrica

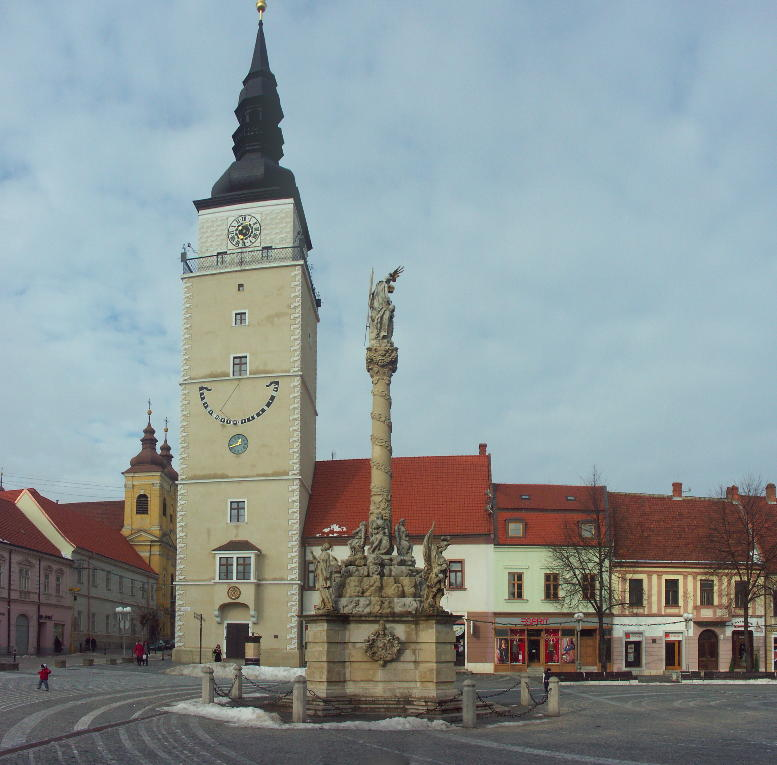
Trnava

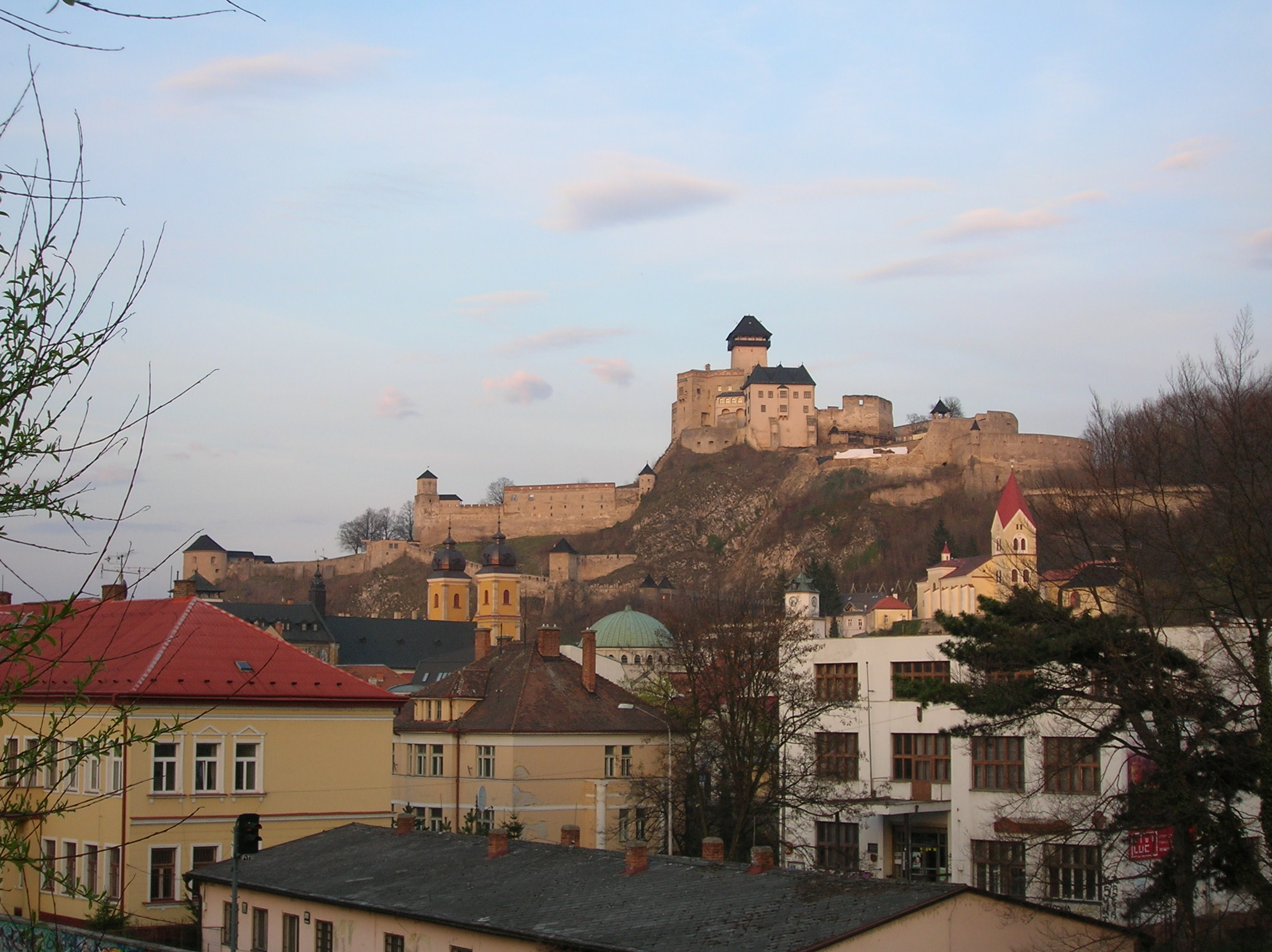
Trenčín

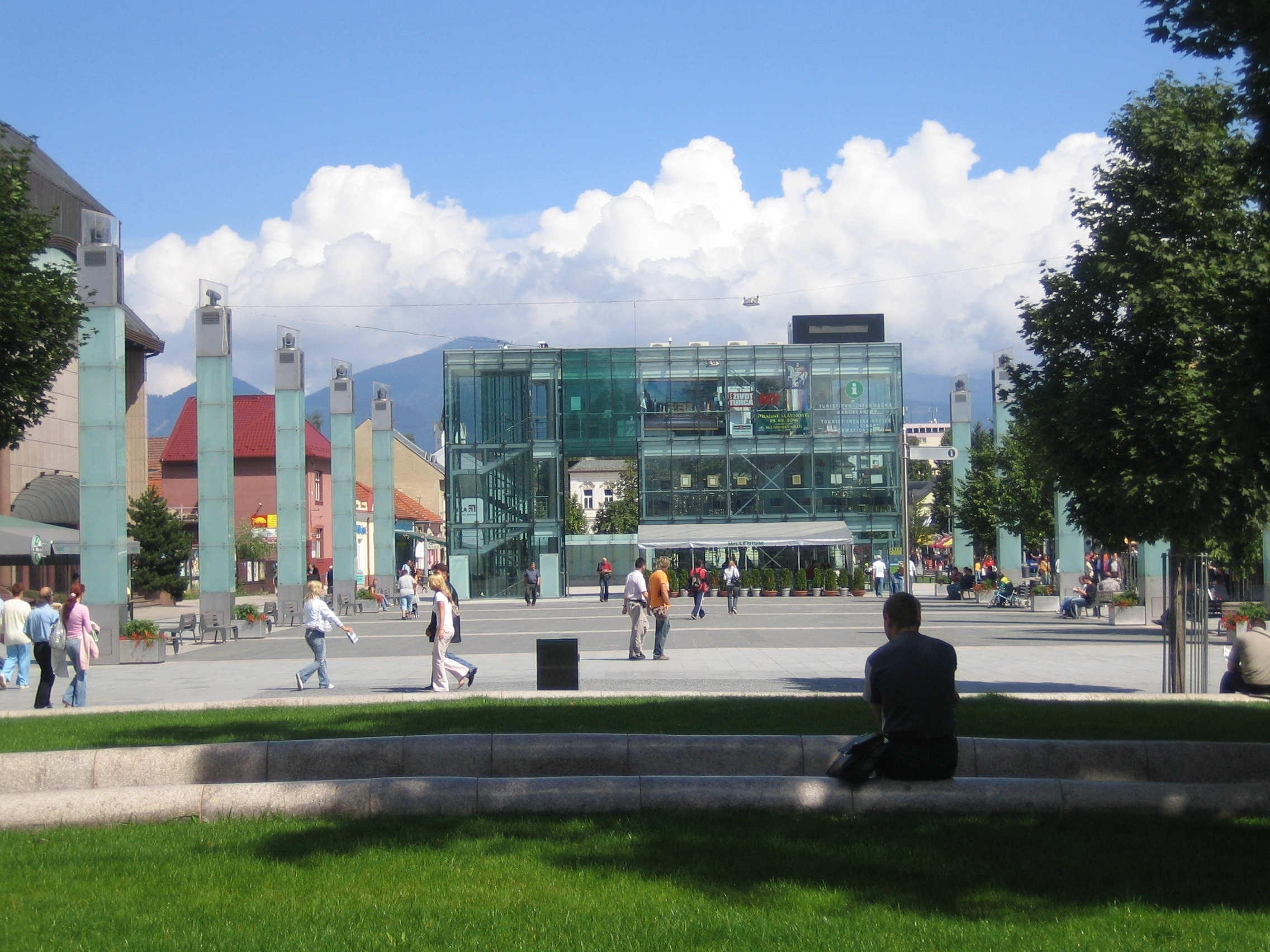
Martin

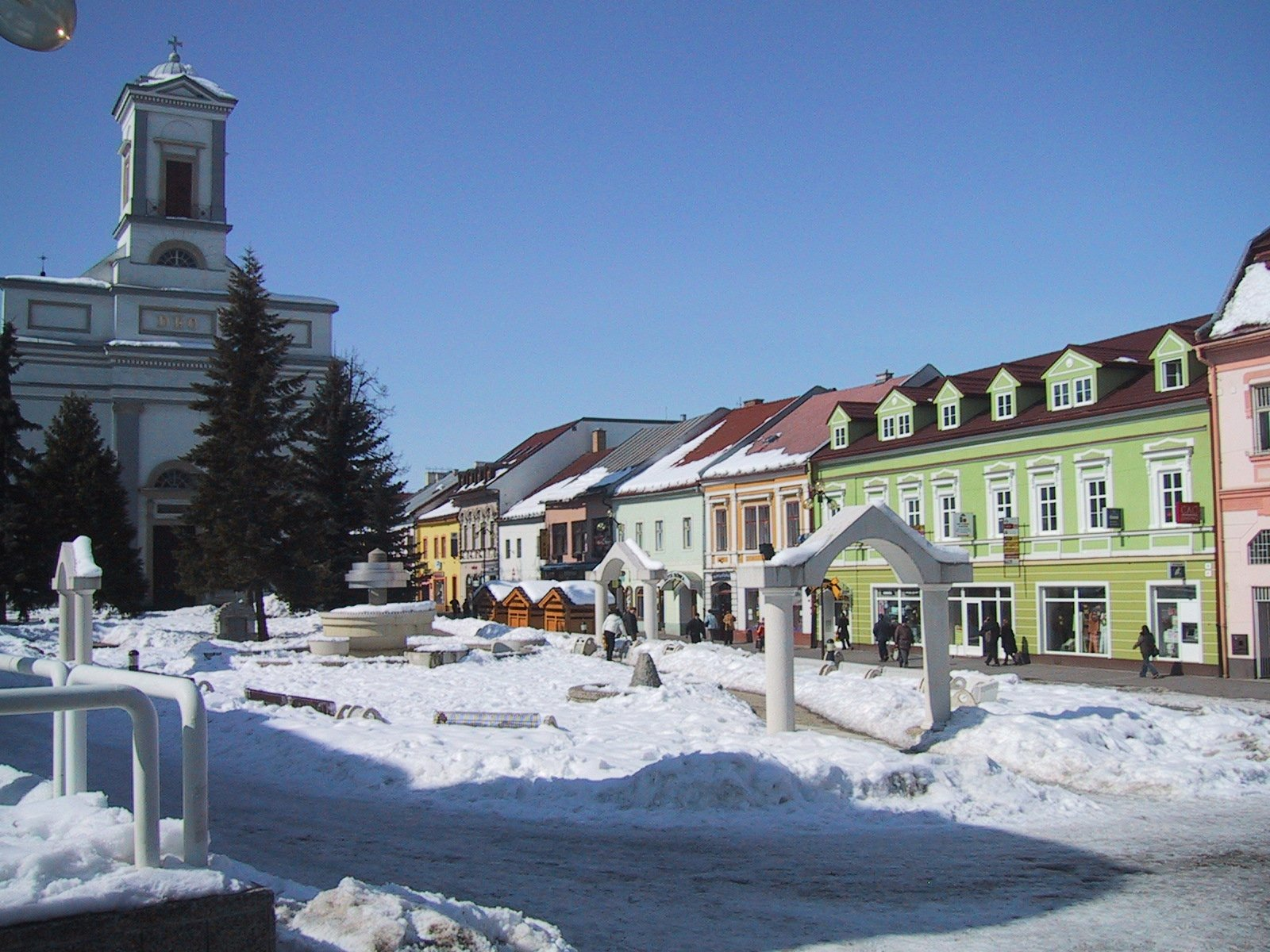
Poprad

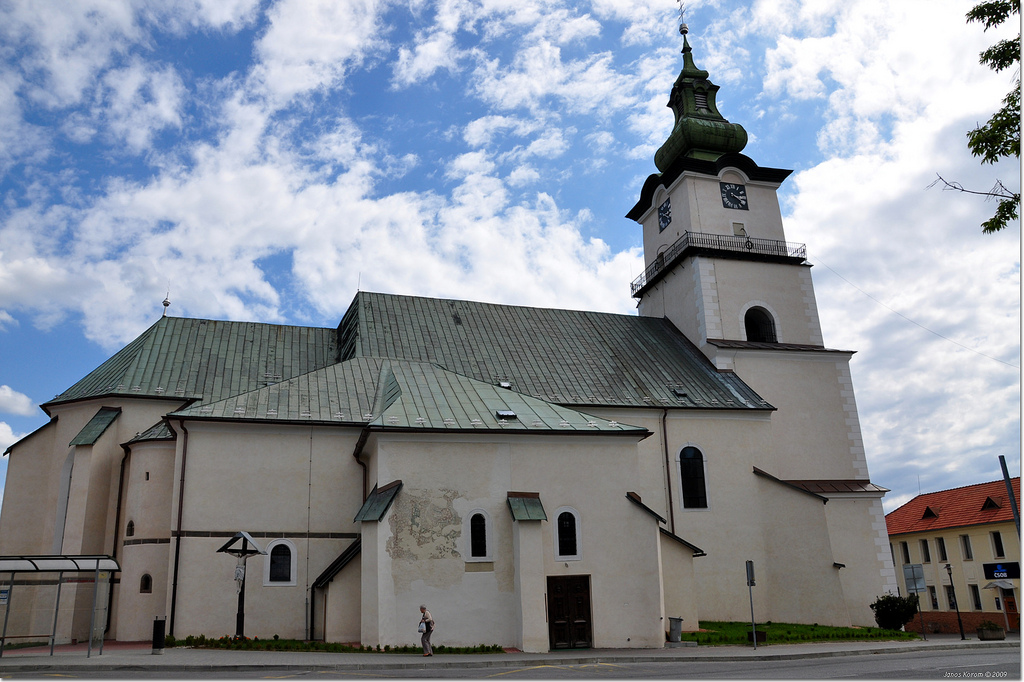
Prievidza

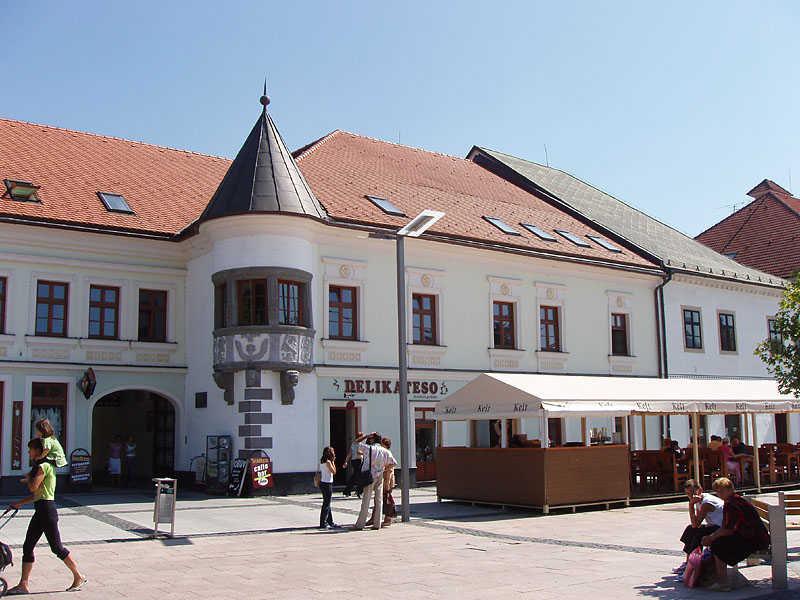
Zvolen

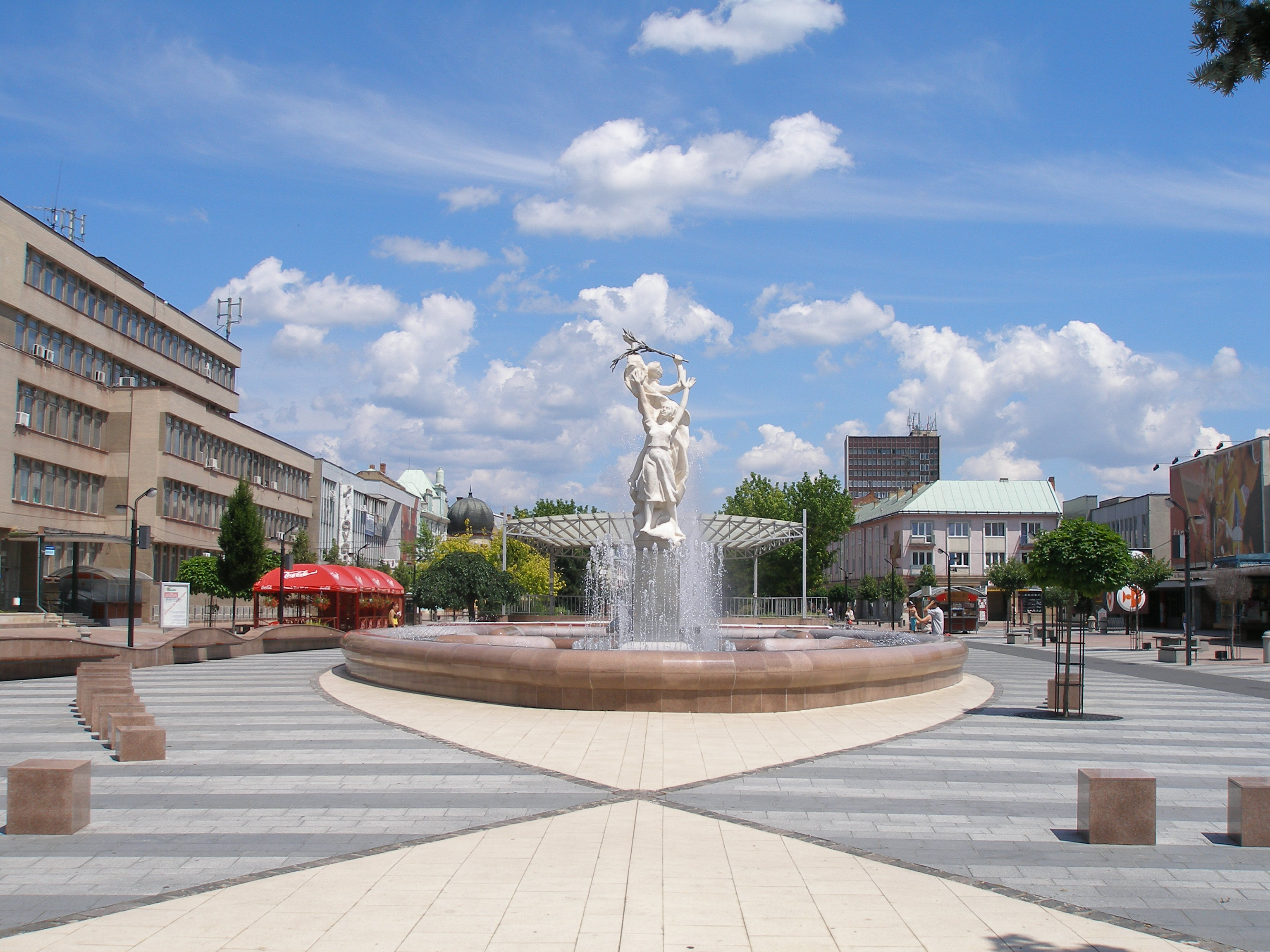
Michalovce

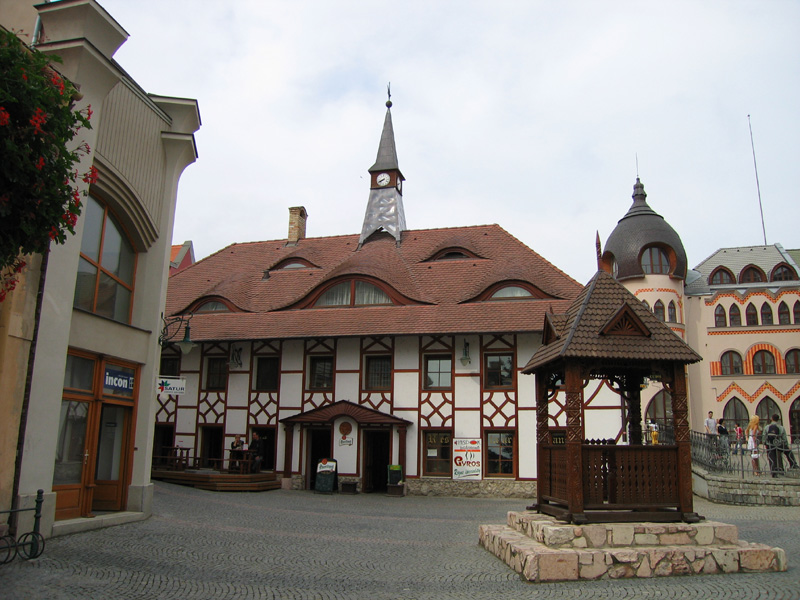
Komárno

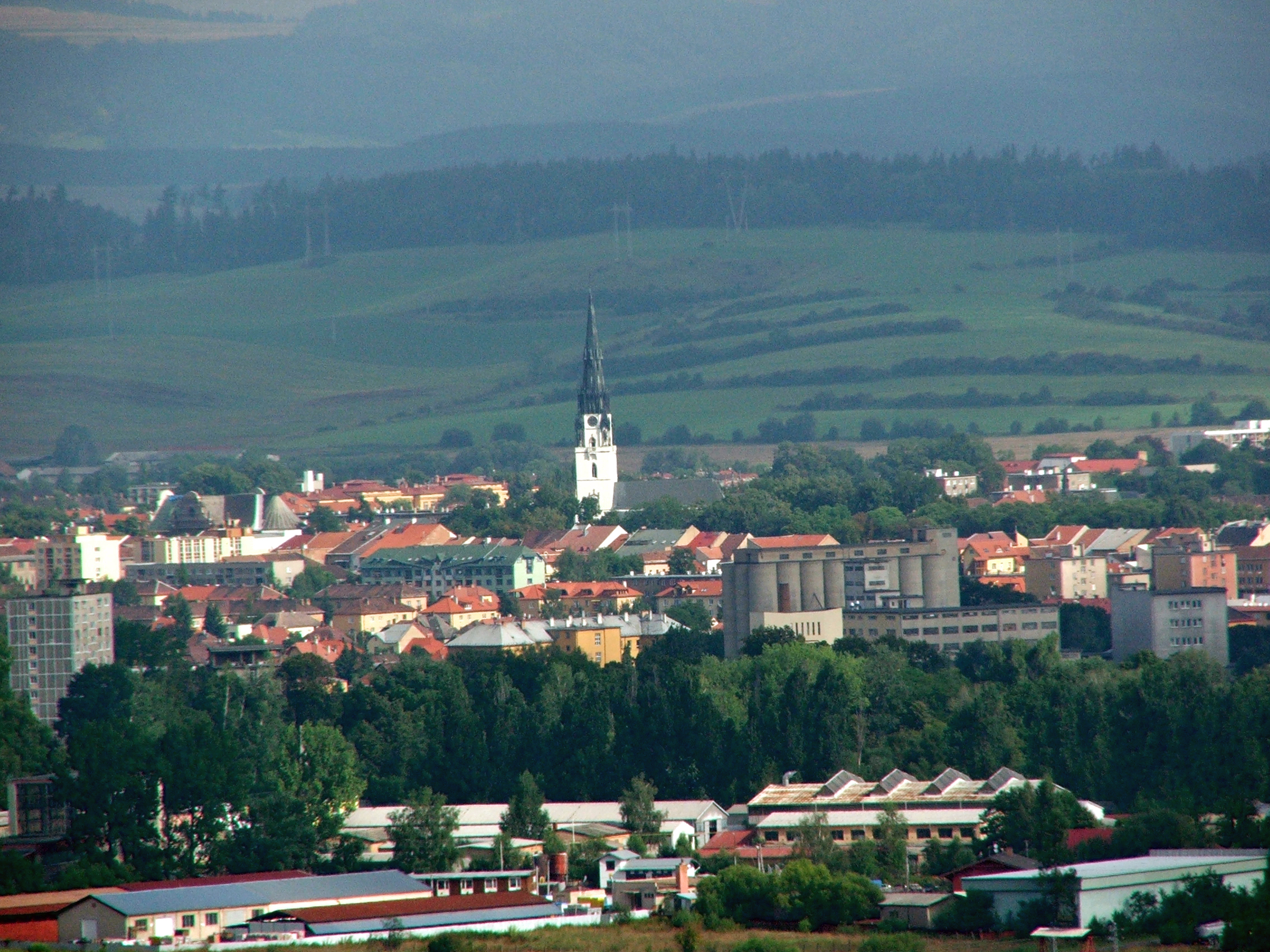
Spišská Nová Ves

Slovakia Slowakien
Slovakian name	German name(s)	Usage notes
Bánovce nad Bebravou	Banowitz	
Banská Bystrica	Neusohl	Empire of Austria
Banská Štiavnica	Schemnitz	Empire of Austria
Bardejov	Bartfeld	Empire of Austria
Bojnice	Weinitz	
Bratislava	Preßburg	Empire of Austria
Brezno	Bries an der Gran	
Brezová pod Bradlom	Birkenhain	
Bytča	Großbitsch	
Čadca	Tschadsa	Rare; Names pronounced alike
Dobšiná	Dobschau	Empire of Austria
Dolný Kubín	Unterkubin	Names mean "lower Kubín"
Dubnica nad Váhom	Dubnitz an der Waag	Names mean "Dubnitz on the Váh"
Dudince	Dudintze	Names pronounced alike
Dunajská Streda	Niedermarkt (very rare)	Names mean "lower market"
Fiľakovo	Fülleck	Empire of Austria (FÜLEK)
Galanta	Gallandau	
Gbely	Egbell	
Gelnica	Göllnitz	Empire of Austria
Handlová	Kreckerhaj	
Handlová	Krickerhau	
Handlová	Krickerhäu	
Hlohovec	Freistadt an der Waag/ Freistadtl	
Hnúšťa	Nusten	
Holíč	Holitsch	Empire of Austria
Holíč	Weißkirchen	
Hriňová	Hrinau	
Humenné	Homenau	Homonna ?
Hurbanovo	Altdala	
Ilava	Illau - Illava ?	Very rare
Jelšava	Eltsch	
Kežmarok	Kaesmark, Kesmark	Empire of Austria
Kysucké Nové Mesto	Kis(s)utz-Neustadtl	
Komárno	Komorn, Comorn	Empire of Austria
Košice	Kaschau, Cashau	Empire of Austria
Krásno nad Kysucou	Crassna	
Kremnica	Kremnitz	Empire of Austria
Krompachy	Krompach	
Krupina	Karpfen	Empire of Austria
Leopoldov	Leopoldstadt	Name means "Leopold town"
Levice	Lewenz	
Levoča	Leutschau	
Lipany	Siebenlinden	
Liptovský Hrádok	Neuhäusel [in der Liptau]	Empire of Austria
Liptovský Mikuláš	Liptau-St. Nikolaus	The Hungarian name Lipto Szent Miklos was in use before 1867
Lučenec	Lizenz	
Malacky	Malaczka	Empire of Austria
Martin	(Turz-)St. Martin	
Medzev	Metzenseifen, Meczenzef	Empire of Austria
Michalovce	Großmichel	
Modra	Modern	Empire of Austria
Modrý Kameň	Blauenstein	
Moldava nad Bodvou	Moldau (an der Bodwa), Szepsi/Moldau	Empire of Austria
Myjava	Miava	Empire of Austria
Nitra	Neutra	Empire of Austria
Nová Baňa	Königsberg an der Gran, in UNG.	Empire of Austria
Nová Dubnica	Neudubnitz	Names mean "New Dubnica"
Nové Mesto nad Váhom	Neustadt an der Waag/ Neustadtl	Names mean "New town on the Váh"
Nové Zámky	Neuhäus(e)l	Names mean "New manor"
Pezinok	Bösing	
Piešťany	Pistyan	Empire of Austria
Piešťany	Püschtin	Very rare
Podolínec	Podolin Pudlein	Empire of Austria
Poprad	Deutschendorf	German name means "German village". The Hungarian name was used in the Austrian Empire.
Považská Bystrica	Waagbistritz	
Prešov	Eperies	Compare Hungarian name Eperjes
Prešov	Preschau	
Prievidza	Priwitz	
Púchov	Puchau	Pucho in Empire of Austria
Rajec	Rajetz	Raitz in Empire of Austria
Rajecké Teplice	Bad Rajetz	Names mean "Rajec Spa"
Revúca	Groß-Rauschenbach	Rare
Rimavská Sobota	Großsteffelsdorf	
Rožňava	Rosenau	Empire of Austria
Ružomberok	Rosenberg	Empire of Austria
Sabinov	Zeben, Zeeben	Empire of Austria
Šahy	Eipelschlag	
Šaľa	Schelle	
Šamorín	Sommerein	Empire of Austria
Šaštín-Stráže	Ews	
Šaštín-Stráže	Sassin	Empire of Austria
Senec	Wartberg	Empire of Austria
Senica	Senitz	
Skalica	Skalitz, Skalicz	Empire of Austria
Sládkovičovo	(Klein-)Diosek	Groß-Diosek also once existed. Dioszegh in Empire of Austria
Sobrance	Sobranz	
Spišská Belá	Zipser Bela	Names mean "Zipser Belá"
Spišská Nová Ves	Neuendorf	
Spišská Nová Ves	(Zipser) Neudorf	Names mean "Zipser new village"
Spišské Podhradie	Kirchdrauf	Empire of Austria
Spišská Stará Ves	Altendorf	Stará Ves and Altendorf mean "Old village". Empire of Austria.
Spišské Vlachy	Wallendorf	Empire of Austria
Stará Ľubovňa	Altlublau	Names mean "Old Lubovna"
Stará Turá	Alt-Turn	Names mean "Old Tura"
Strážske	Straschke	
Stropkov	Stroppkau	
Stupava	Stampfen	Empire of Austria
Štúrovo	Parkan	
Šurany	Schuran	Rare
Svätý Jur	St. Georgen in Ungarn	Empire of Austria
Svidník	Oberswidnik	German name means "Upper Svidník"
Tisovec	Theißholz	
Tisovec	Theisscholcz	Empire of Austria
Topoľčany	Topoltschan	
Trebišov	Trebischau	
Trenčín	Trentschin	Trenchin in Empire of Austria
Trenčianske Teplice	Trentschinteplitz	
Trnava	Tyrnau, Tirnau	Empire of Austria
Trstená	B[r]ingenstadt	
Turčianske Teplice	Bad Stuben	
Tvrdošín	Turdoschin	
Veľký Šariš	Großscharosch	
Vranov nad Topľou	Frö(h)nel	
Vranov nad Topľou	Vronau an der Töpl	Names mean "Vranov on the Topľa"
Vrbové	Werbau	
Vrútky	Ruttek	Rare
Vysoké Tatry	Hohe Tatra	High Tatra", a mountain range
Žarnovica	Scharnowitz	
Želiezovce	Zelis, Zeliz	Empire of Austria
Žiar nad Hronom	Heiligenkreuz, Heligenkreutz	Empire of Austria
Žilina	Sillein	
Zlaté Moravce	Goldmorawitz	Names mean "Golden Moravce"
Zvolen	Altsohl	Empire of Austria

== See also ==
- German exonyms
- List of cities and towns in Slovakia
