= Turany =

- Municipality
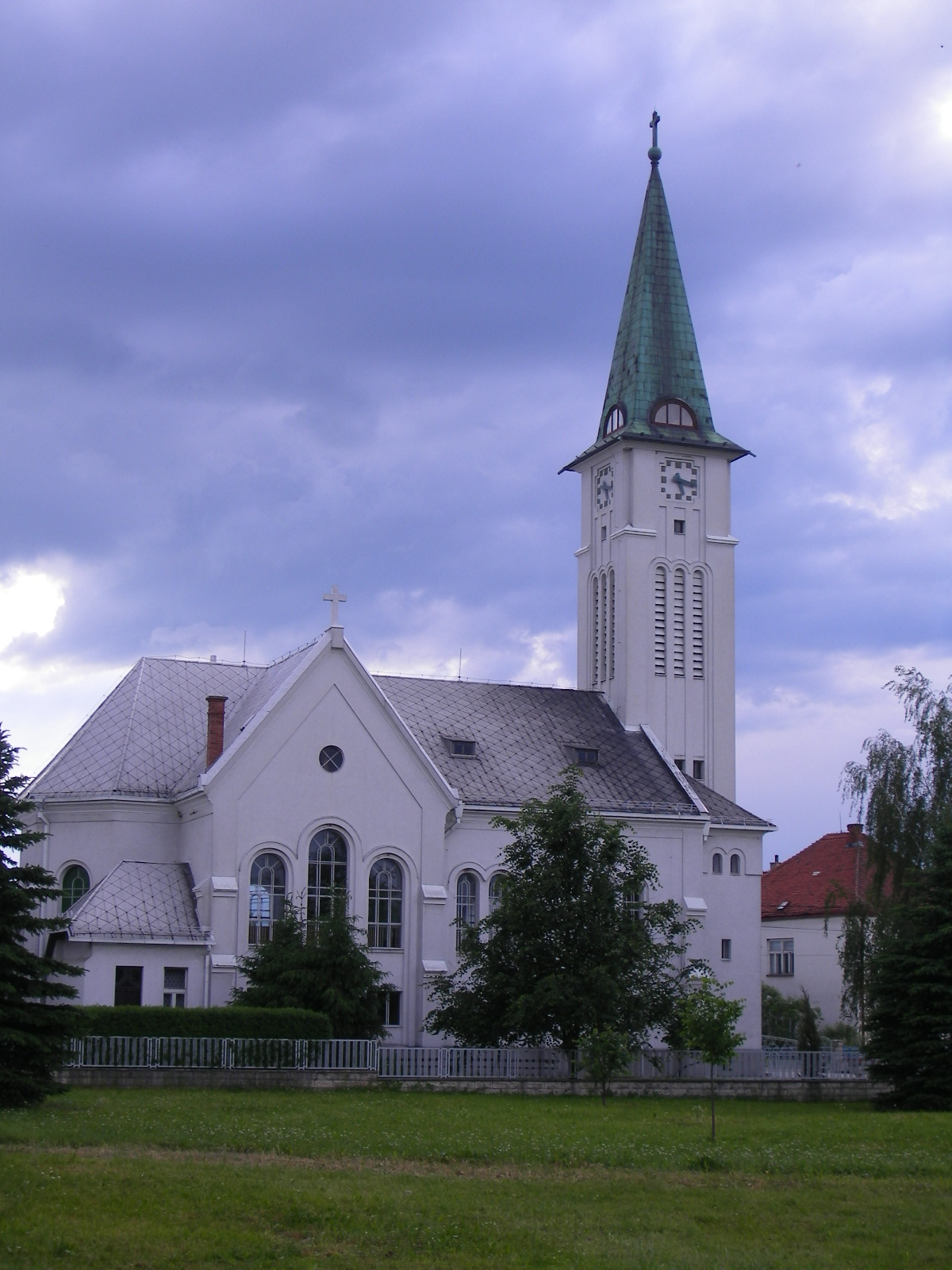
- Evangelical church

- Flag Coat of arms

- Location of Turany in the Žilina Region Location of Turany in Slovakia
- Coordinates: 49.12°N 19.05°E
- Country: Slovakia
- Region: Žilina Region
- District: Martin District
- First mentioned: 1341

Area
  - Total: 46.74 km^{2} (18.05 sq mi)
- Elevation: 401 m (1,316 ft)

Population (2025)
  - Total: 4,054
- Time zone: UTC+1 (CET)
  - Summer (DST): UTC+2 (CEST)
- Postal code: 385 3
- Area code: +421 43
- Vehicle registration plate (until 2022): MT
- Website: www.turany.sk

Turany (Hungarian: Nagyturány) is a town and municipality in Martin District in the Žilina Region of northern Slovakia.

== History ==
In historical records the town was first mentioned in 1341. Before the establishment of independent Czechoslovakia in 1918, it was part of Turóc County within the Kingdom of Hungary. From 1939 to 1945, it was part of the Slovak Republic.

== Geography ==
The municipality lies at an altitude of 401 metres (1,316 ft) and covers an area of 46.74 km^{2} (18.05 sq mi) (2025).

== Population ==
Population statistic (10 years)
Year	1995	2005	2015	2025
Count	4602	4407	4269	4054
Difference		−4.23%	−3.13%	−5.03%

Population statistic
Year	2024	2025
Count	4085	4054
Difference		−0.75%

It has a population of 4054 people (31 December 2025).

=== Ethnicity ===
Census 2021 (1+ %)
Ethnicity	Number	Fraction
Slovak	3935	93.84%
Not found out	251	5.98%
Total	4193	

In year 2021 was 4193 people by ethnicity 3935 as Slovak, 251 as Not found out, 27 as Czech, 11 as Other, 9 as Hungarian, 8 as German, 7 as Polish, 4 as Romani, 3 as Russian, 2 as Bulgarian, 1 as Chinese, 1 as Irish, 1 as Romanian and 1 as Croatian.

Note on population: The difference values of population numbers in the table "Population statistic" and in the sections "Ethnicity" & "Religion" is caused by the use of various statistical methods.

=== Religion ===
Census 2021 (1+ %)
Religion	Number	Fraction
Evangelical Church	1488	35.49%
Roman Catholic Church	1280	30.53%
None	1024	24.42%
Not found out	271	6.46%
Total	4193	

In year 2021 was 4193 people by religion 1488 from Evangelical Church, 1280 from Roman Catholic Church, 1024 from None, 271 from Not found out, 34 from Greek Catholic Church, 19 from Ad hoc movements, 17 from Christian Congregations in Slovakia, 14 from Other, 13 from Other and not ascertained christian church, 11 from Seventh-day Adventist Church, 5 from Buddhism, 4 from Eastern Orthodox Church, 4 from Islam, 3 from United Methodist Church, 2 from Calvinist Church, 2 from Jehovah's Witnesses, 1 from Paganism and natural spirituality and 1 from Czechoslovak Hussite Church.
