= Zlatno =

Zlatno may refer to several places in Slovakia.

- Zlatno, Poltár District
- Zlatno, Zlaté Moravce District
