= České Brezovo =

České Brezovo Csehberek
- Municipality
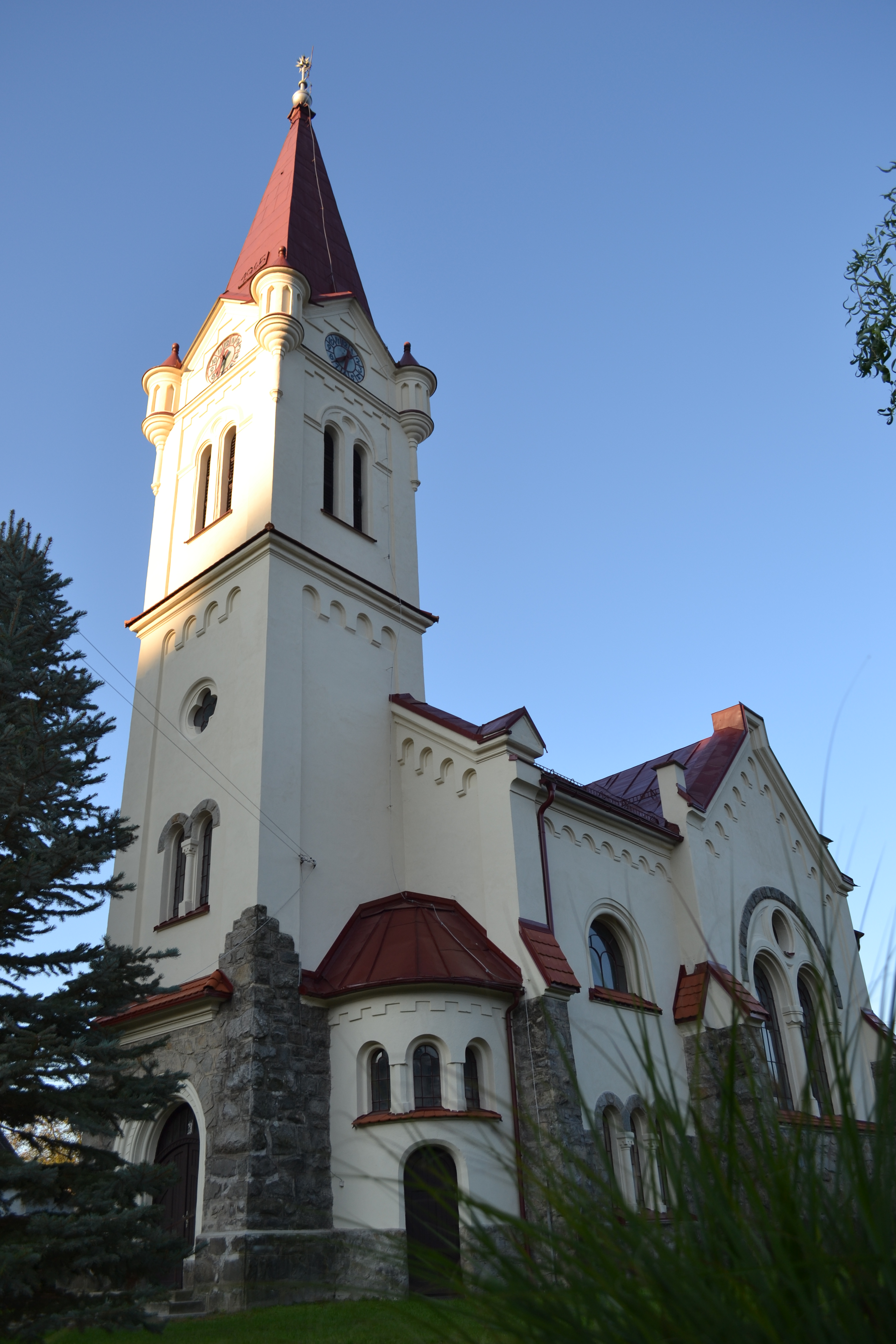
- Evangelical Church in České Brezovo

- Flag

- Location of České Brezovo in the Banská Bystrica Region Location of České Brezovo in Slovakia
- Coordinates: 48.43°N 19.65°E
- Country: Slovakia
- Region: Banská Bystrica Region
- District: Poltár District
- First mentioned: 1435

Area
  - Total: 38.92 km^{2} (15.03 sq mi)
- Elevation: 451 m (1,480 ft)

Population (2025)
  - Total: 435
- Time zone: UTC+1 (CET)
  - Summer (DST): UTC+2 (CEST)
- Postal code: 985 03
- Area code: +421 47
- Vehicle registration plate (until 2022): PT
- Website: www.ceskebrezovo.sk

České Brezovo (1773: Cžeska Brezowa; Hungarian: Csehberek, until 1899: Cseh-Brézó) is a village and municipality in the Poltár District in the Banská Bystrica Region of Slovakia.

== Geography ==
The municipality lies at an altitude of 451 metres (1,480 ft) and covers an area of 38.92 km^{2} (15.03 sq mi) (2025).

== History ==
In historical records, the village was surely mentioned in 1435 (Brezow, Bryzow), but the existence of the village in the area is recorded from 1334 as belonging to Zách, Bosnyák and Szentiványi families. In 1834 János György Zahn (Slovak: Ján Juraj Zahn) based a glasswork in Zlatno settlement. Before the establishment of independent Czechoslovakia in 1918, České Brezovo was part of Nógrád County within the Kingdom of Hungary. From 1939 to 1945, it was part of the Slovak Republic.

== Population ==
Population statistic (10 years)
Year	1995	2005	2015	2025
Count	976	492	499	435
Difference		−49.59%	+1.42%	−12.82%

Population statistic
Year	2024	2025
Count	435	435
Difference		+1.42%

It has a population of 435 people (31 December 2025).

=== Ethnicity ===
Census 2021 (1+ %)
Ethnicity	Number	Fraction
Slovak	435	97.97%
Not found out	13	2.92%
Total	444	

In year 2021 was 444 people by ethnicity 435 as Slovak, 13 as Not found out, 1 as Czech, 1 as Hungarian and 1 as Other.

Note on population: The difference values of population numbers in the table "Population statistic" and in the sections "Ethnicity" & "Religion" is caused by the use of various statistical methods.

=== Religion ===
Census 2021 (1+ %)
Religion	Number	Fraction
Roman Catholic Church	156	35.14%
Evangelical Church	153	34.46%
None	116	26.13%
Not found out	9	2.03%
Total	444	

In year 2021 was 444 people by religion 156 from Roman Catholic Church, 153 from Evangelical Church, 116 from None, 9 from Not found out, 3 from Greek Catholic Church, 2 from Baptists Church, 1 from Old Catholic Church, 1 from Eastern Orthodox Church, 1 from Paganism and natural spirituality, 1 from Other and 1 from Ad hoc movements.

== Culture ==
In České Brezovo was born Bohuslav Tablic, one of the leaders of Slovak classicism. Village commemorates him with a memory plaque on a public library.

== Notable personalities ==
- František Krňan, mathematician
- Bohuslav Tablic, poet, translator, literary historian

== Genealogical resources ==
The records for genealogical research are available at the state archive "Statny Archiv in Banska Bystrica, Slovakia"

- Lutheran church records (births/marriages/deaths): 1784-1925 (parish A)

== See also ==
- List of municipalities and towns in Slovakia
