= Cinobaňa =

Cinobaňa Szinóbánya
- Municipality
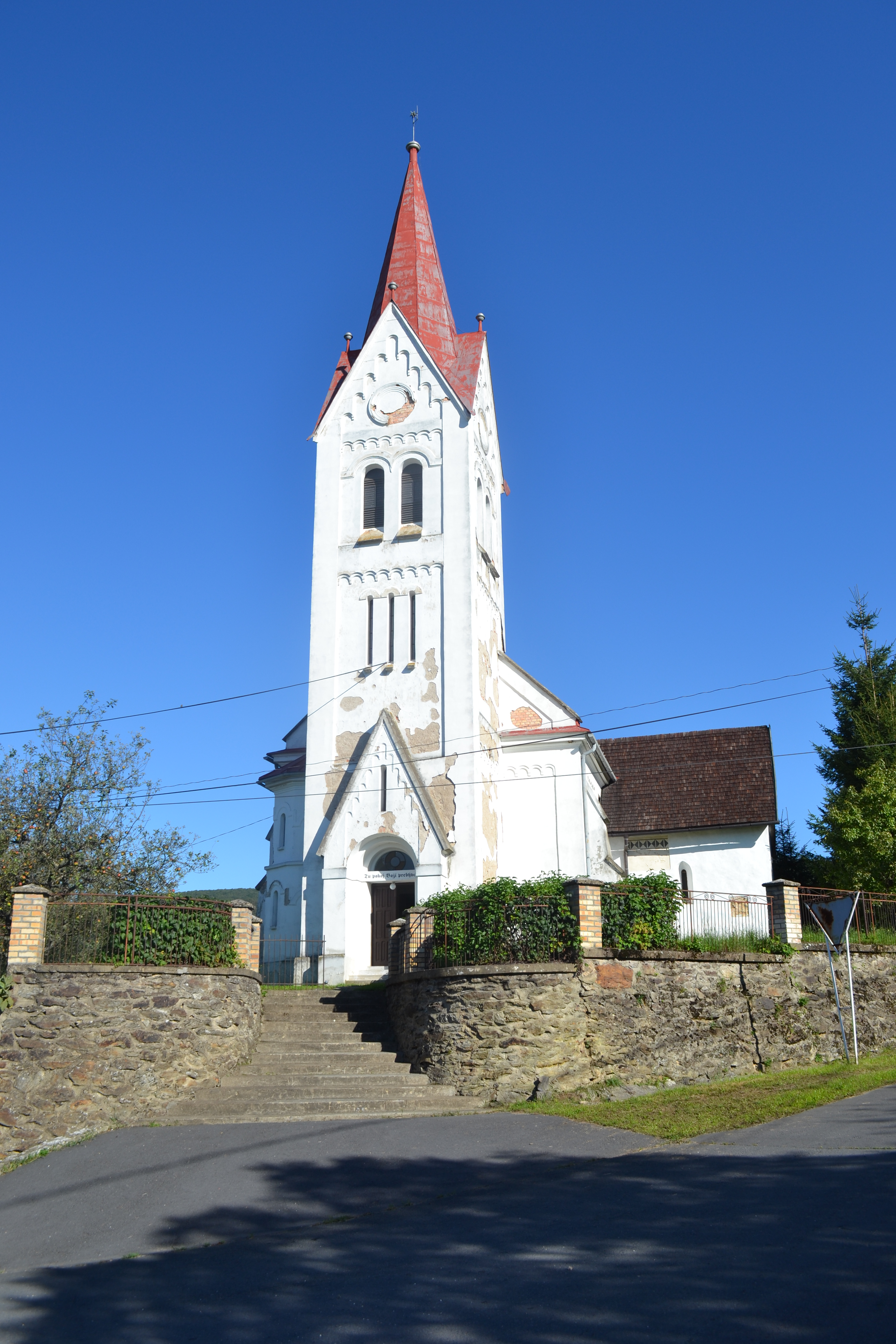

- Flag

- Location of Cinobaňa in the Banská Bystrica Region Location of Cinobaňa in Slovakia
- Coordinates: 48.45°N 19.65°E
- Country: Slovakia
- Region: Banská Bystrica Region
- District: Poltár District
- First mentioned: 1279

Area
  - Total: 39.22 km^{2} (15.14 sq mi)
- Elevation: 432 m (1,417 ft)

Population (2025)
  - Total: 1,962
- Time zone: UTC+1 (CET)
  - Summer (DST): UTC+2 (CEST)
- Postal code: 985 22
- Area code: +421 47
- Vehicle registration plate (until 2022): PT
- Website: www.cinobana.sk

Cinobaňa (Hungarian: Szinóbánya, German: Frauenberg) is a village and municipality in the Poltár District in the Banská Bystrica Region of Slovakia. It belongs to the largest municipalities in Poltár District, together with Málinec.

== Geography ==
The municipality lies at an altitude of 432 metres (1,417 ft) and covers an area of 39.22 km^{2} (15.14 sq mi) (2025).

== History ==
In historical records, the village was first mentioned in 1279 as a miner village (1276 Villa Suine, 1342 Schiuina, 1393 Zennabanya, 1460 Zwinyebanya). It belonged to Somoskő Castle. From 1554 to 1594 it was occupied by Turks. Before the establishment of independent Czechoslovakia in 1918, it was part of Nógrád County within the Kingdom of Hungary. From 1939 to 1945, it was part of the Slovak Republic.

== Population ==
Population statistic (10 years)
Year	1995	2005	2015	2025
Count	2406	2340	2284	1962
Difference		−2.74%	−2.39%	−14.09%

Population statistic
Year	2024	2025
Count	1964	1962
Difference		−0.10%

It has a population of 1962 people (31 December 2025).

=== Ethnicity ===
Census 2021 (1+ %)
Ethnicity	Number	Fraction
Slovak	1913	93.09%
Not found out	130	6.32%
Romani	112	5.45%
Total	2055	

In year 2021 was 2055 people by ethnicity 1913 as Slovak, 130 as Not found out, 112 as Romani, 16 as Hungarian, 8 as Czech, 7 as Russian, 2 as Serbian, 1 as Jewish, 1 as Austrian, 1 as Other and 1 as Croatian.

Note on population: The difference values of population numbers in the table "Population statistic" and in the sections "Ethnicity" & "Religion" is caused by the use of various statistical methods.

=== Religion ===
Census 2021 (1+ %)
Religion	Number	Fraction
Roman Catholic Church	939	45.69%
None	555	27.01%
Evangelical Church	320	15.57%
Not found out	127	6.18%
Baptists Church	86	4.18%
Total	2055	

In year 2021 was 2055 people by religion 939 from Roman Catholic Church, 555 from None, 320 from Evangelical Church, 127 from Not found out, 86 from Baptists Church, 7 from Greek Catholic Church, 6 from Other, 4 from Jehovah's Witnesses, 3 from Ad hoc movements, 2 from Buddhism, 1 from Paganism and natural spirituality, 1 from Christian Congregations in Slovakia, 1 from Islam, 1 from Hinduism, 1 from United Methodist Church and 1 from Seventh-day Adventist Church.

== Economy ==
Part of Cinobaňa municipality are also villages Katarínska Huta and Turičky and the settlements Hrnčiarky and Žihľava. In Katarínska Huta was in 1836 glasswork constructed, which was overtaken by Ján Kožuch in 1854. Ján Kožuch established here in 1847 a small steelwork, which was in 1854 overtaken by Kuchyňka family. Both factories still exist, but a part of the larger companies. The village is popular for organising several sport festivals and events.

== Genealogical resources ==
The records for genealogical research are available at the state archive "Statny Archiv in Banska Bystrica, Slovakia"

- Roman Catholic church records (births/marriages/deaths): 1776-1905 (parish B)
- Lutheran church records (births/marriages/deaths): 1769-1918 (parish A)

== See also ==
- List of municipalities and towns in Slovakia
