= Šurany =

- Town
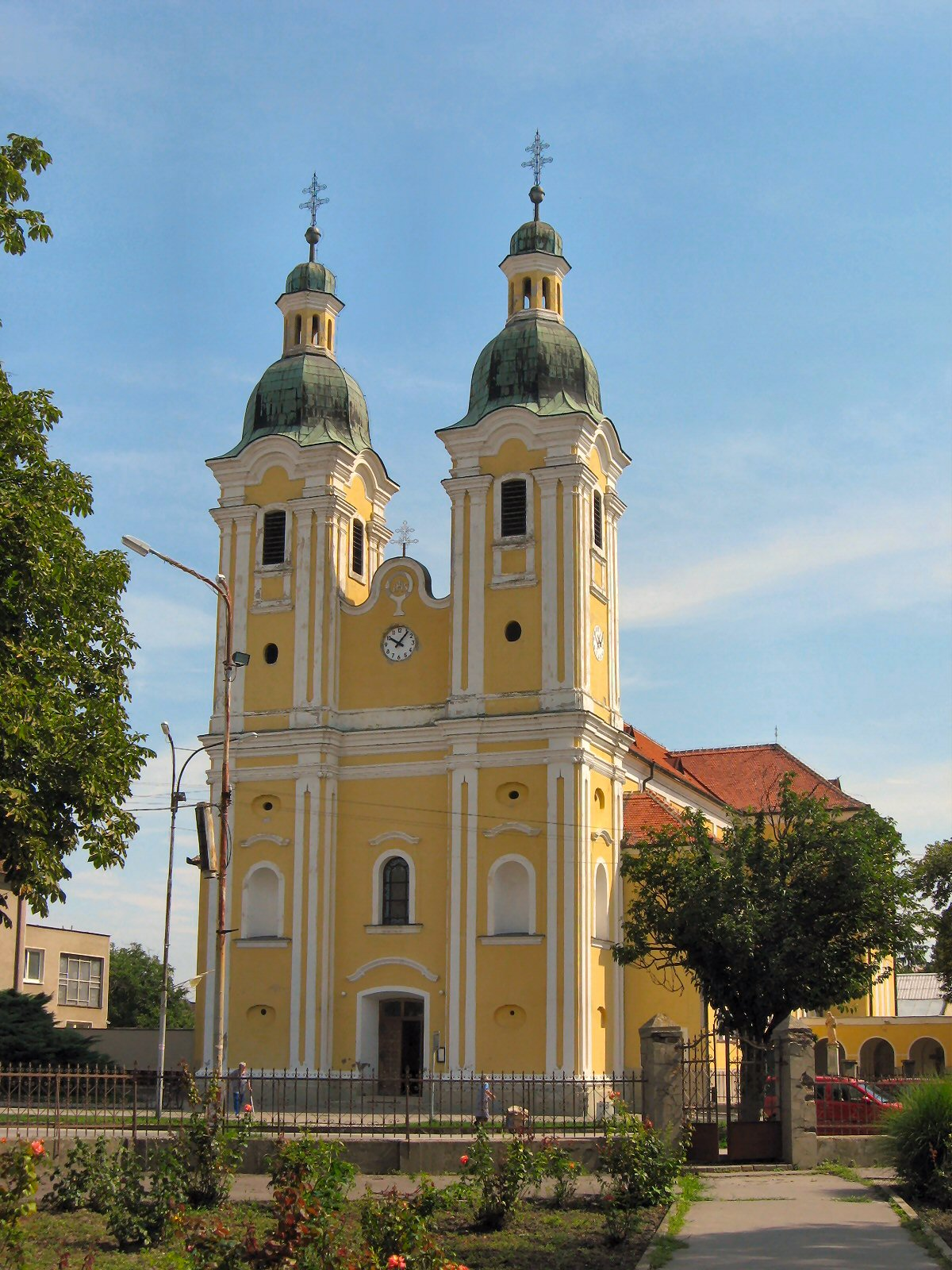
- Church of St. Stephen the protomartyr

- Flag Coat of arms

- Location in Nitra Region Location in Slovakia
- Coordinates: 48°05′14″N 18°11′10″E
- Country: Slovakia
- Region: Nitra Region
- District: Nové Zámky
- First mentioned: 1138

Government
  - Mayor: Marcel Filaga

Area
  - Total: 59.81 km^{2} (23.09 sq mi)
- (2022)
- Elevation: 123 m (404 ft)

Population (2025)
  - Total: 9,001
- Time zone: UTC+1 (CET)
  - Summer (DST): UTC+2 (CEST)
- Postal code: 942 01
- Area code: +421 35
- Vehicle registration plate (until 2022): NZ
- Website: www.surany.sk

Šurany (until 1927, Veľké Šurany) is a town and a railroad hub in the Nové Zámky District, Nitra Region, southern Slovakia.

Alongside the main settlement, it has the boroughs of Kostolný Sek and Nitriansky Hrádok, both annexed 1976.

== Etymology ==
The town name comes from Slavic šur-, šurý (curved, in a wider sense hilly) + the suffix -any referring to people. Šurany: "people from hills", the opposite of Rovňany: "people from plains".

== History ==
The town was first mentioned under name villa Suran in a document of Hungarian king Béla II in 1138. There was a castle existing since the second half of the 15th century. Between 1568 and 1581, the town was the seat of the Captaincy of Lower Hungary. The settlement was occupied by the Turks in 1663–84. The castle was torn down in 1725. In 1832 the town was made a royal town with market rights. A sugar factory was established in 1854 (closed in 2000). Before the establishment of independent Czechoslovakia in 1918, Šurany was part of Nyitra County within the Kingdom of Hungary. From 1938 to 1945, it was again part of Hungary as a consequence of the First Vienna Award. On 29 March 1945, the Red Army entered Šurany and it once again belonged to Czechoslovakia.

== Archaeology ==
Archaeological discoveries show that the site of the present-day town was inhabited in the Neolithic.

In the 2020s, the Institute of Archaeology of the Slovak Academy of Sciences, in collaboration with MH Invest, has conducted a large scale rescue excavation ahead of the planned Šurany Industrial Park. The excavations revealed a Roman military camp dating to the second half of the 2nd century AD, probably connected with the Marcomannic Wars (166–180 AD). According to excavation director Matej Ruttkay, it is the first such Roman military camp found in the Nitra Region.

The camp covers approximately 7.4 hectares and includes defensive features such as a rampart, ditch, and five entrances, one of which incorporates a clavicula-type (curved gate-and-ditch entrance design) plan, reportedly the first example of this gate type identified in Slovakia. Archaeologists reported evidence that the camp was destroyed shortly after a battle, including human remains found in the camp's ditch.

== Geography ==
The municipality lies at an altitude of 123 metres (404 ft) and covers an area of 59.81 km^{2} (23.09 sq mi) (2025).

It is located in the Danubian Lowland near the Nitra River, 13 kilometres (8 mi) away from Nové Zámky and around 100 kilometres (62 mi) from Bratislava.

== Population ==
Historical population
Year	Pop.	±%
1970	9,168	—
1980	9,598	+4.7%
1991	10,192	+6.2%
2001	10,491	+2.9%
2011	10,177	−3.0%
2021	9,562	−6.0%
Source: Censuses

Population statistic (10 years)
Year	1995	2005	2015	2025
Count	10,514	10,497	9960	9001
Difference		−0.16%	−5.11%	−9.62%

Population statistic
Year	2024	2025
Count	9103	9001
Difference		−1.12%

It has a population of 9001 people (31 December 2025).

=== Ethnicity ===
Census 2021 (1+ %)
Ethnicity	Number	Fraction
Slovak	8756	91.57%
Not found out	688	7.19%
Total	9562	

In year 2021 was 9562 people by ethnicity 8756 as Slovak, 688 as Not found out, 71 as Hungarian, 65 as Czech, 31 as Romani, 27 as Other, 17 as Russian, 9 as Rusyn, 8 as Vietnamese, 6 as Korean, 5 as Ukrainian, 5 as Moravian, 4 as German, 3 as Chinese, 3 as Serbian, 3 as Polish, 2 as Irish, 2 as Italian, 2 as Croatian, 2 as Bulgarian, 2 as English, 1 as Turkish, 1 as Silesian, 1 as Romanian, 1 as Austrian and 1 as French.

Note on population: The difference values of population numbers in the table "Population statistic" and in the sections "Ethnicity" & "Religion" is caused by the use of various statistical methods.

=== Religion ===
Census 2021 (1+ %)
Religion	Number	Fraction
Roman Catholic Church	5795	60.6%
None	2567	26.85%
Not found out	889	9.3%
Evangelical Church	103	1.08%
Total	9562	

In year 2021 was 9562 people by religion 5795 from Roman Catholic Church, 2567 from None, 889 from Not found out, 103 from Evangelical Church, 46 from Christian Congregations in Slovakia, 35 from Ad hoc movements, 34 from Greek Catholic Church, 15 from Buddhism, 14 from Eastern Orthodox Church, 14 from Other, 12 from Calvinist Church, 7 from Paganism and natural spirituality, 7 from Other and not ascertained christian church, 7 from Islam, 5 from Jehovah's Witnesses, 5 from United Methodist Church, 2 from Hinduism, 2 from Apostolic Church, 1 from Seventh-day Adventist Church, 1 from Church of Jesus Christ of Latter-day Saints and 1 from Baptists Church.

== People ==
Šurany featured in a 2006 episode of Who Do You Think You Are? featuring Stephen Fry. Fry was tracing his Jewish ancestry in the town, where his maternal grandfather Martin Neumann was a manager at the Šurany sugar factory and was recruited to work in the burgeoning sugar industry in Bury St Edmunds, England. Neumann and his wife Rosa Braun Neumann immigrated to Bury in 1926.
