= Ďubákovo =

Ďubákovo Vágó
- Municipality
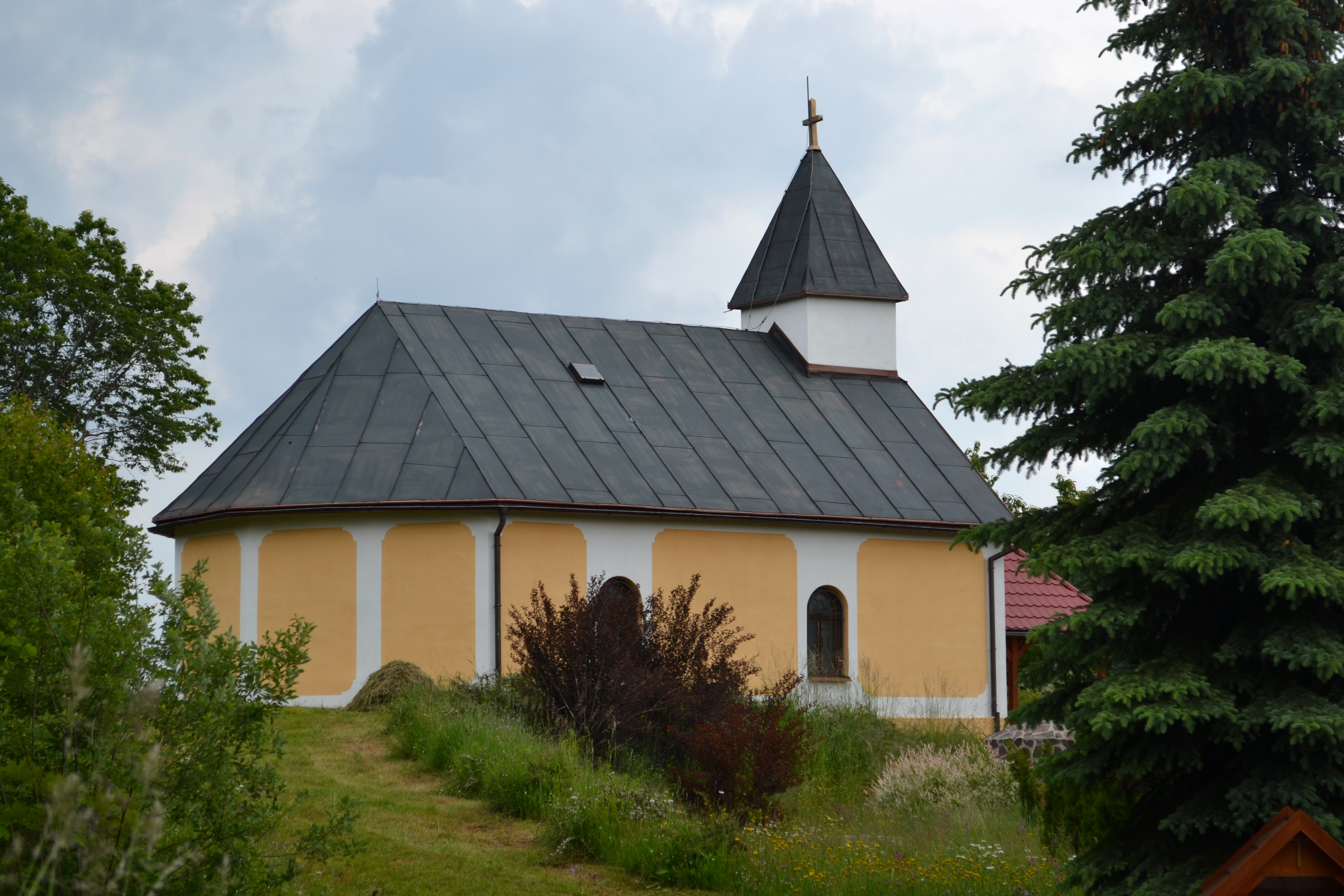

- Flag

- Location of Ďubákovo in the Banská Bystrica Region Location of Ďubákovo in Slovakia
- Coordinates: 48.55°N 19.73°E
- Country: Slovakia
- Region: Banská Bystrica Region
- District: Poltár District
- First mentioned: 1877

Area
  - Total: 6.39 km^{2} (2.47 sq mi)
- Elevation: 820 m (2,690 ft)

Population (2025)
  - Total: 82
- Time zone: UTC+1 (CET)
  - Summer (DST): UTC+2 (CEST)
- Postal code: 985 07
- Area code: +421 47
- Vehicle registration plate (until 2022): PT

Ďubákovo (Hungarian: Vágó) is a village and municipality in the Poltár District in the Banská Bystrica Region of Slovakia.

== Geography ==
The municipality lies at an altitude of 820 metres (2,690 ft) and covers an area of 6.39 km^{2} (2.47 sq mi) (2025).

== History ==
Before the establishment of independent Czechoslovakia in 1918, Ďubákovo was part of Gömör and Kishont County within the Kingdom of Hungary. From 1939 to 1945, it was part of the Slovak Republic.

== Population ==
Population statistic (10 years)
Year	1995	2005	2015	2025
Count	128	111	84	82
Difference		−13.28%	−24.32%	−2.38%

Population statistic
Year	2024	2025
Count	84	82
Difference		−2.38%

It has a population of 82 people (31 December 2025).

=== Ethnicity ===
Census 2021 (1+ %)
Ethnicity	Number	Fraction
Slovak	75	94.93%
Not found out	4	5.06%
Total	79	

In year 2021 was 79 people by ethnicity 75 as Slovak and 4 as Not found out.

Note on population: The difference values of population numbers in the table "Population statistic" and in the sections "Ethnicity" & "Religion" is caused by the use of various statistical methods.

=== Religion ===
Census 2021 (1+ %)
Religion	Number	Fraction
Roman Catholic Church	58	73.42%
None	14	17.72%
Not found out	6	7.59%
Ad hoc movements	1	1.27%
Total	79	

In year 2021 was 79 people by religion 58 from Roman Catholic Church, 14 from None, 6 from Not found out and 1 from Ad hoc movements.

== Genealogical resources ==
The records for genealogical research are available at the state archive "Statny Archiv in Banska Bystrica, Slovakia"

- Roman Catholic church records (births/marriages/deaths): 1809-1896 (parish B)
- Lutheran church records (births/marriages/deaths): 1837-1911 (parish B)

== See also ==
- List of municipalities and towns in Slovakia
