= Breznička, Poltár District =

Breznička Ipolyberzence
- Municipality
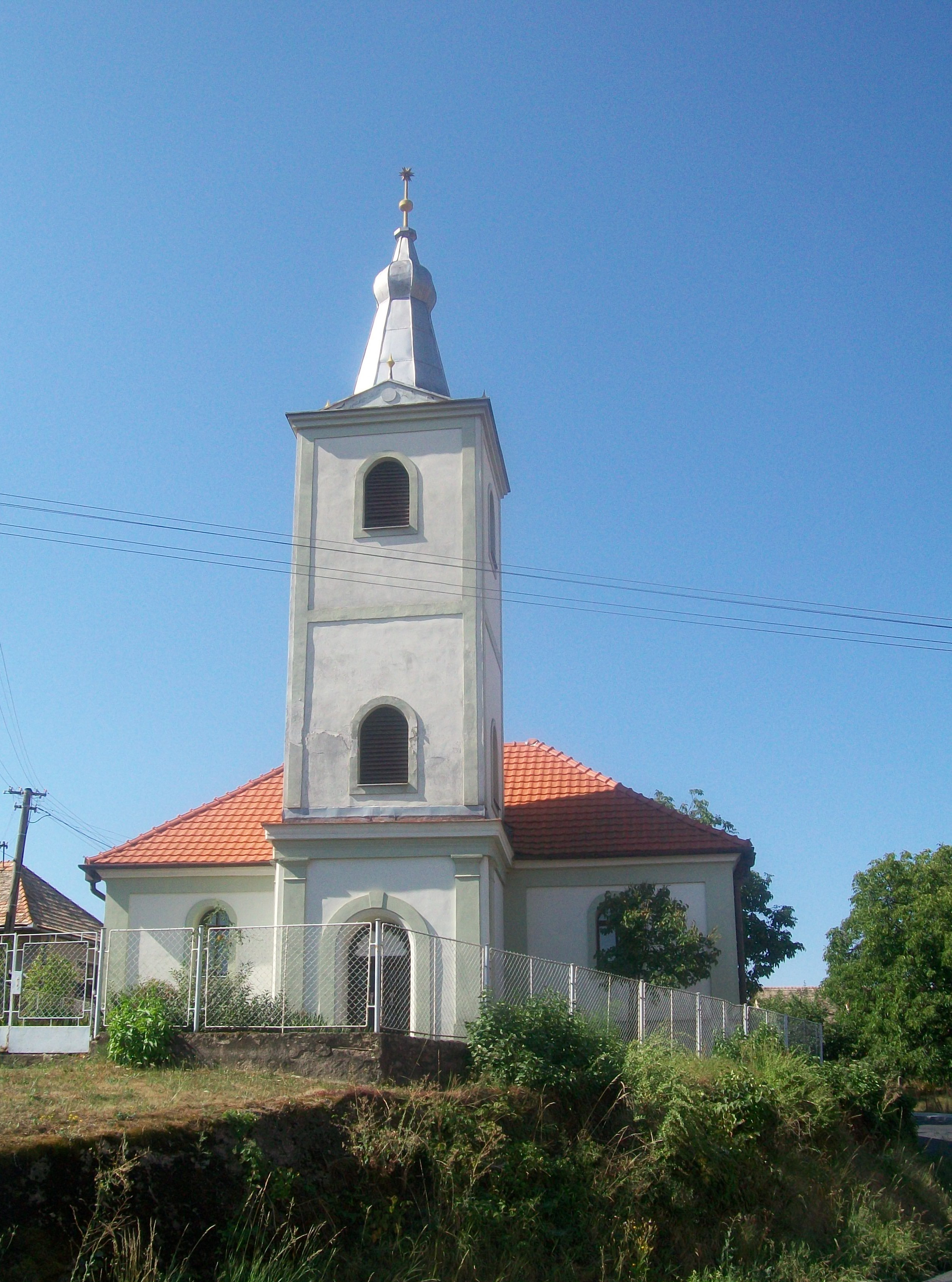
- Evangelical Church in Breznička

- Flag

- Location of Breznička in the Banská Bystrica Region Location of Breznička in Slovakia
- Coordinates: 48°25′N 19°44′E
- Country: Slovakia
- Region: Banská Bystrica Region
- District: Poltár District
- First mentioned: 1279

Area
  - Total: 9.38 km^{2} (3.62 sq mi)
- Elevation: 227 m (745 ft)

Population (2025)
  - Total: 731
- Time zone: UTC+1 (CET)
  - Summer (DST): UTC+2 (CEST)
- Postal code: 985 02
- Area code: +421 47
- Vehicle registration plate (until 2022): PT
- Website: www.obecbreznicka.sk

Breznička (Hungarian: Ipolyberzence, German: Bersentz) is a village and municipality in the Poltár District in the Banská Bystrica Region of Slovakia.

== History ==
In historical records the village was first mentioned in 1279 (Berzenche) as a Slavic settlement. Before the establishment of independent Czechoslovakia in 1918, it was part of Nógrád County within the Kingdom of Hungary. From 1939 to 1945, it was part of the Slovak Republic.

== Population ==
Population statistic (10 years)
Year	1995	2005	2015	2025
Count	775	780	775	731
Difference		+0.64%	−0.64%	−5.67%

Population statistic
Year	2024	2025
Count	744	731
Difference		−1.74%

It has a population of 731 people (31 December 2025).

=== Ethnicity ===
Census 2021 (1+ %)
Ethnicity	Number	Fraction
Slovak	709	97.79%
Not found out	9	1.24%
Total	725	

In year 2021 was 725 people by ethnicity 709 as Slovak, 9 as Not found out, 7 as Hungarian, 5 as Czech, 1 as German and 1 as Other.

Note on population: The difference values of population numbers in the table "Population statistic" and in the sections "Ethnicity" & "Religion" is caused by the use of various statistical methods.

=== Religion ===
Census 2021 (1+ %)
Religion	Number	Fraction
Roman Catholic Church	428	59.03%
None	166	22.9%
Evangelical Church	112	15.45%
Not found out	9	1.24%
Total	725	

In year 2021 was 725 people by religion 428 from Roman Catholic Church, 166 from None, 112 from Evangelical Church, 9 from Not found out, 3 from Other, 2 from Other and not ascertained christian church, 2 from Ad hoc movements, 1 from Hinduism, 1 from Greek Catholic Church and 1 from United Methodist Church.

== See also ==
- List of municipalities and towns in Slovakia

== Genealogical resources ==
The records for genealogical research are available at the state archive "Statny Archiv in Banska Bystrica, Slovakia"

- Roman Catholic church records (births/marriages/deaths): 1776-1905 (parish A)
- Lutheran church records (births/marriages/deaths): 1734-1897 (parish B)
