= Veľká Ves =

Veľká Ves Losoncnagyfalu
- Municipality
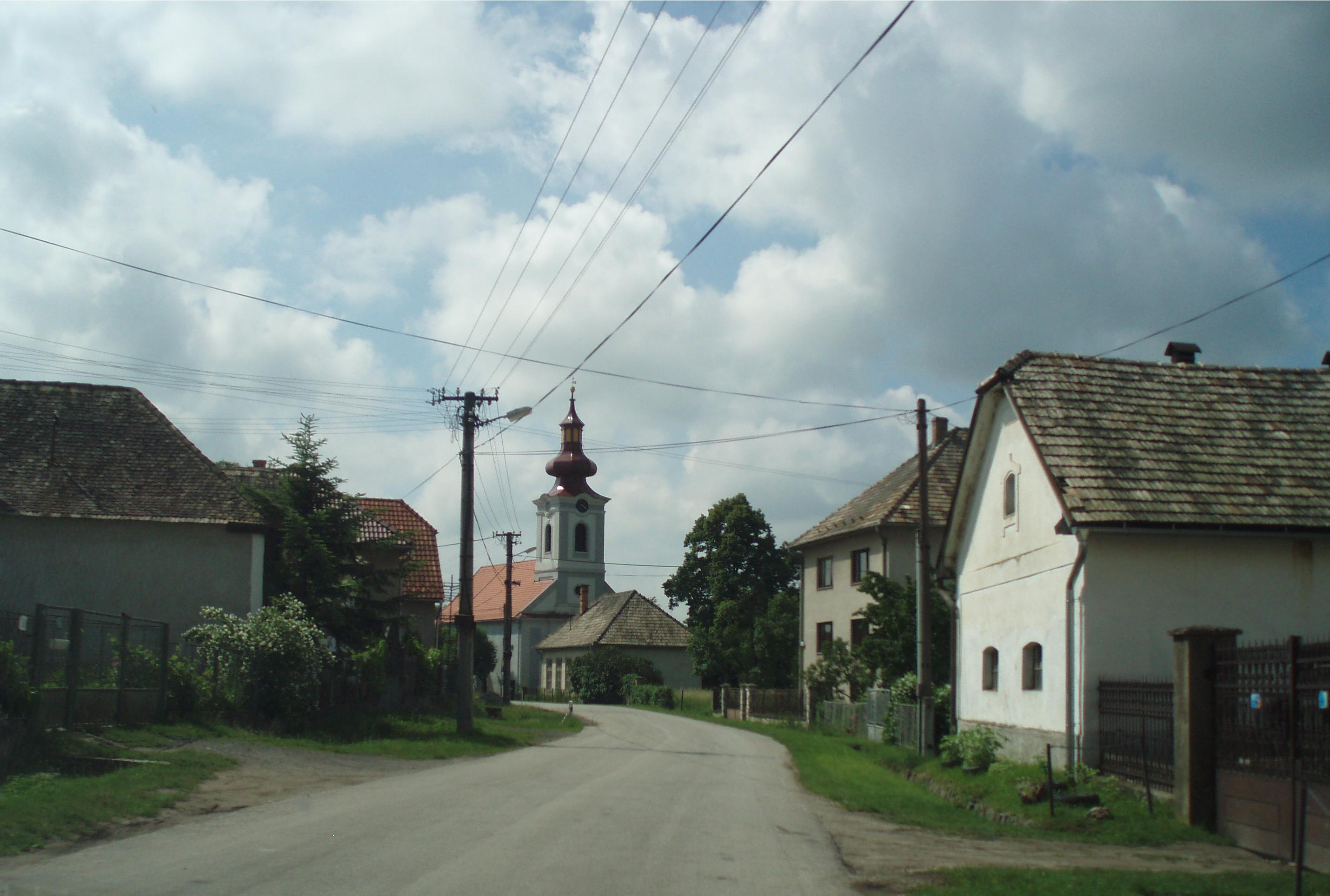

- Flag

- Location of Veľká Ves in the Banská Bystrica Region Location of Veľká Ves in Slovakia
- Coordinates: 48.37°N 19.67°E
- Country: Slovakia
- Region: Banská Bystrica Region
- District: Poltár District
- First mentioned: 1335

Area
  - Total: 9.80 km^{2} (3.78 sq mi)
- Elevation: 204 m (669 ft)

Population (2025)
  - Total: 410
- Time zone: UTC+1 (CET)
  - Summer (DST): UTC+2 (CEST)
- Postal code: 985 01
- Area code: +421 47
- Vehicle registration plate (until 2022): PT
- Website: www.velkaves.sk

Veľká Ves (Hungarian: Losoncnagyfalu) is a village and municipality in the Poltár District in the Banská Bystrica Region of Slovakia. The most important sightseeing is baroque-classical evangelical church from 1772. In the village are foodstuff store and a public library.

== Geography ==
The municipality lies at an altitude of 204 metres (669 ft) and covers an area of 9.80 km^{2} (3.78 sq mi) (2025).

== History ==
Before the establishment of independent Czechoslovakia in 1918, Veľká Ves was part of Nógrád County within the Kingdom of Hungary. From 1939 to 1945, it was part of the Slovak Republic.

== Population ==
Population statistic (10 years)
Year	1995	2005	2015	2025
Count	430	421	446	410
Difference		−2.09%	+5.93%	−8.07%

Population statistic
Year	2024	2025
Count	410	410
Difference		+1.42%

It has a population of 410 people (31 December 2025).

=== Ethnicity ===
Census 2021 (1+ %)
Ethnicity	Number	Fraction
Slovak	408	96.22%
Not found out	19	4.48%
Total	424	

In year 2021 was 424 people by ethnicity 408 as Slovak, 19 as Not found out, 1 as Czech, 1 as Hungarian and 1 as Other.

Note on population: The difference values of population numbers in the table "Population statistic" and in the sections "Ethnicity" & "Religion" is caused by the use of various statistical methods.

=== Religion ===
Census 2021 (1+ %)
Religion	Number	Fraction
Roman Catholic Church	225	53.07%
Evangelical Church	106	25%
None	71	16.75%
Not found out	19	4.48%
Total	424	

In year 2021 was 424 people by religion 225 from Roman Catholic Church, 106 from Evangelical Church, 71 from None, 19 from Not found out, 1 from Greek Catholic Church, 1 from Buddhism and 1 from Ad hoc movements.
