= Utekáč =

Utekáč Újantalvölgy
- Municipality
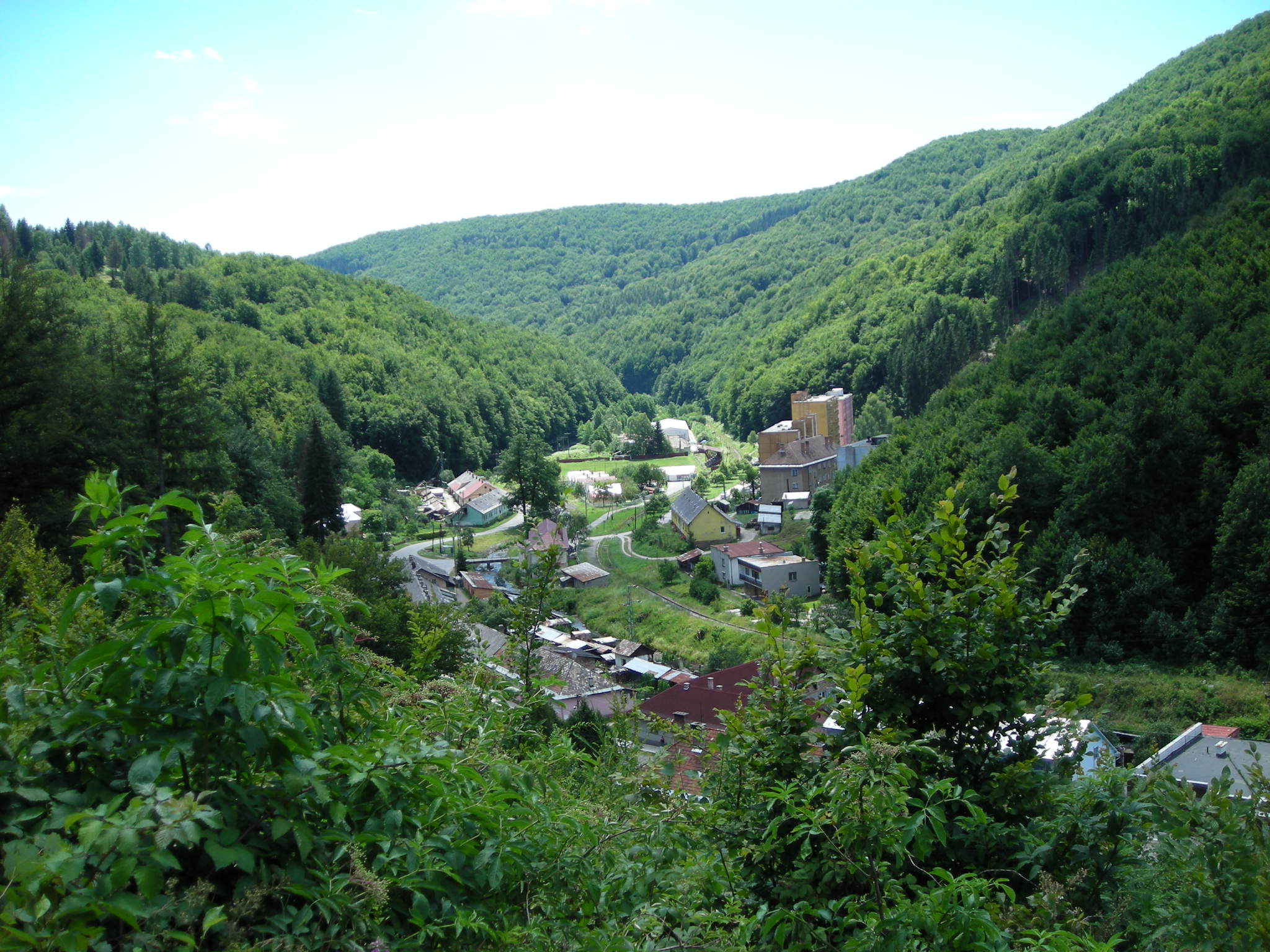

- Flag

- Location of Utekáč in the Banská Bystrica Region Location of Utekáč in Slovakia
- Coordinates: 48.60°N 19.80°E
- Country: Slovakia
- Region: Banská Bystrica Region
- District: Poltár District
- First mentioned: 1593

Area
  - Total: 26.94 km^{2} (10.40 sq mi)
- Elevation: 402 m (1,319 ft)

Population (2025)
  - Total: 812
- Time zone: UTC+1 (CET)
  - Summer (DST): UTC+2 (CEST)
- Postal code: 985 06
- Area code: +421 47
- Vehicle registration plate (until 2022): PT
- Website: www.obecutekac.sk

Utekáč (Hungarian: Újantalvölgy) is a village and municipality in the Poltár District in the Banská Bystrica Region of Slovakia.

In the middle of Veporské vrchy, in the narrow valley of the Rimavica river, the village Utekáč is situated. Its name is derived from the útek (meaning escape) of Hungarian king Bela IV ahead of the Tatars.

== Geography ==
The municipality lies at an altitude of 402 metres (1,319 ft) and covers an area of 26.94 km^{2} (10.40 sq mi) (2025).

== History ==
The first mention about Utekáč is from the year 1593. Before the establishment of independent Czechoslovakia in 1918, it was part of Gömör and Kishont County within the Kingdom of Hungary. From 1939 to 1945, it was part of the Slovak Republic.

Development of Utekáč began in 1787 when earl Forgáč came to the territory. He built up a few glassworks from which just the biggest – Clara – is preserved. Aboriginal inhabitants of the glasswork's colony moved in families of glassworks experts from Germany, Hungary, Bohemia and Moravia. Modern history began on 1 January 1993 with establishment of the separate village. Utekáč was only an industrial part of the village Kokava nad Rimavicou before. With its industrial and housing development it is a small town now. Its villages Salajka, Drahová, Havrilovo, Dlhá Lúka, Ďurkovka, Bánik, Nad Rimava and Cisársko are typical mountain settlements of original folk architecture character. The residences in the village Salajka are Finnish wooden storeyed houses.

From the historic point of view, there is the dominant mansion of Earl Forgáč and a Chapel of Saint Anton Paduánsky that also serves as the tomb of the Kuchynka family – the owners of glassworks. In Drahová and Havrilovo there are interesting small chapels. A trio of fujara makers and fujarists, the Kubincs brought the village fame. During the II. World War and SNP there were severe fighting on the village's territory. The memorial of fallen in local park and the vale of Nikolaj Chmelnický with three memorials characterize events from that period. Lovers of hiking, mushroom picking, hunting and fishing will enjoyed the vicinity. The village has a suitable location for development of tourism, forest tourism and farming. There are excellent conditions for running tracks and downhill skiing – ski tows are directly in Utekáč and in the vicinity.

Attractions: Folk crafts, Glass tradition, Tourist march "Utekáčska horská tridsiatka", "Utekáčska horská stovka", Ski tow.

== Population ==
Population statistic (10 years)
Year	1995	2005	2015	2025
Count	1319	1131	988	812
Difference		−14.25%	−12.64%	−17.81%

Population statistic
Year	2024	2025
Count	825	812
Difference		−1.57%

It has a population of 812 people (31 December 2025).

=== Ethnicity ===
Census 2021 (1+ %)
Ethnicity	Number	Fraction
Slovak	845	96.24%
Not found out	25	2.84%
Czech	11	1.25%
Total	878	

In year 2021 was 878 people by ethnicity 845 as Slovak, 25 as Not found out, 11 as Czech, 4 as Russian, 4 as Polish, 2 as Italian, 1 as Romani, 1 as German, 1 as Hungarian and 1 as English.

Note on population: The difference values of population numbers in the table "Population statistic" and in the sections "Ethnicity" & "Religion" is caused by the use of various statistical methods.

=== Religion ===
Census 2021 (1+ %)
Religion	Number	Fraction
Roman Catholic Church	484	55.13%
None	276	31.44%
Evangelical Church	55	6.26%
Not found out	43	4.9%
Total	878	

In year 2021 was 878 people by religion 484 from Roman Catholic Church, 276 from None, 55 from Evangelical Church, 43 from Not found out, 5 from Paganism and natural spirituality, 5 from Greek Catholic Church, 4 from Ad hoc movements, 2 from Other, 1 from Jewish community, 1 from Eastern Orthodox Church, 1 from Jehovah's Witnesses and 1 from Christian Congregations in Slovakia.
