= Hrnčiarske Zalužany =

Hrnčiarske Zalužany Fazekaszsaluzsány
- Municipality
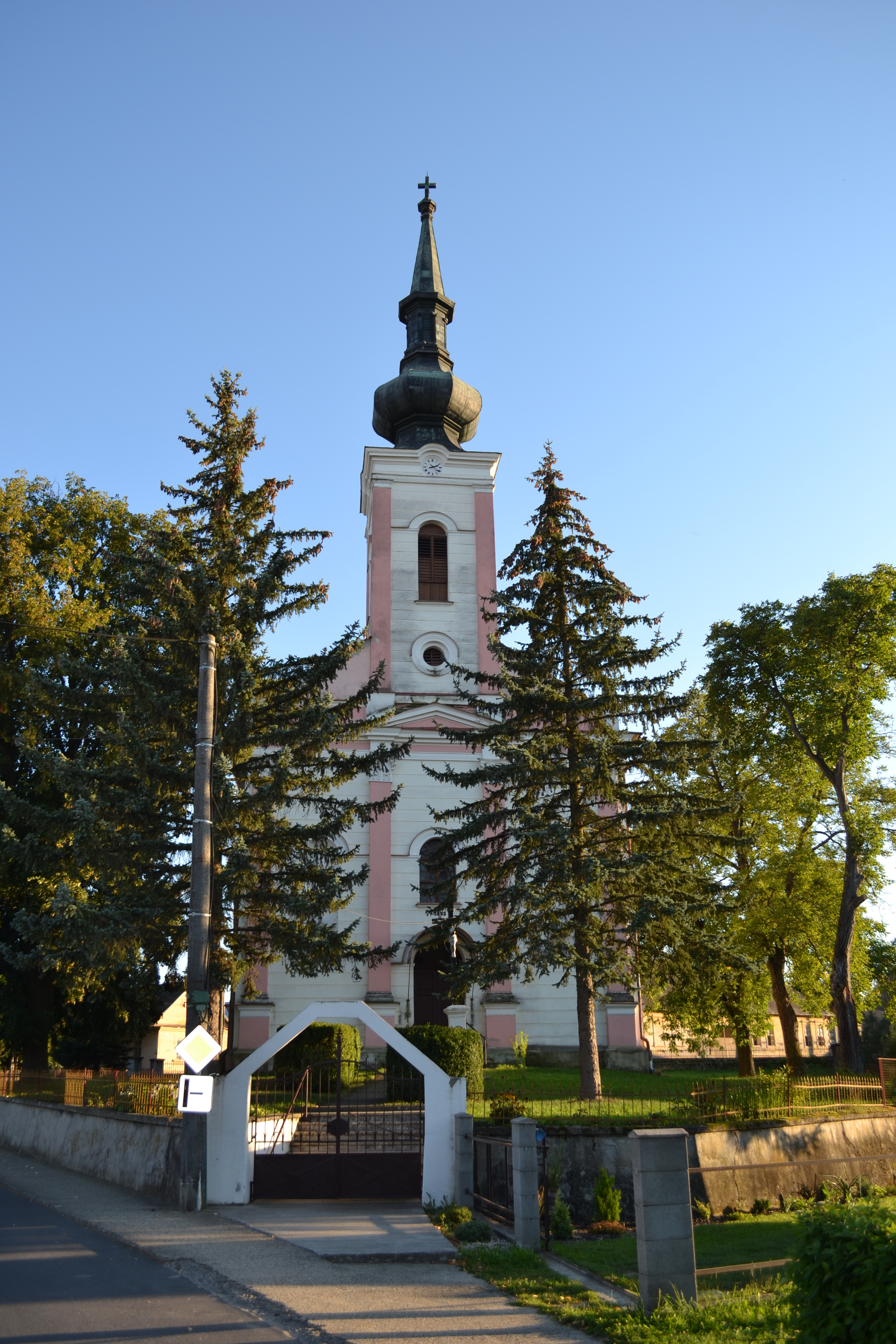
- Church of the Assumption

- Flag

- Location of Hrnčiarske Zalužany in the Banská Bystrica Region Location of Hrnčiarske Zalužany in Slovakia
- Coordinates: 48.40°N 19.87°E
- Country: Slovakia
- Region: Banská Bystrica Region
- District: Poltár District
- First mentioned: 1362

Area
  - Total: 6.09 km^{2} (2.35 sq mi)
- Elevation: 223 m (732 ft)

Population (2025)
  - Total: 799
- Time zone: UTC+1 (CET)
  - Summer (DST): UTC+2 (CEST)
- Postal code: 980 12
- Area code: +421 47
- Vehicle registration plate (until 2022): PT
- Website: www.hrnciarskezaluzany.sk

Hrnčiarske Zalužany (Hungarian: Fazekaszsaluzsány) is a village and municipality in the Poltár District in the Banská Bystrica Region of Slovakia.

== Geography ==
The municipality lies at an altitude of 223 metres (732 ft) and covers an area of 6.09 km^{2} (2.35 sq mi) (2025).

== History ==
Before the establishment of independent Czechoslovakia in 1918, Hrnčiarske Zalužany was part of Gömör and Kishont County within the Kingdom of Hungary. From 1939 to 1945, it was part of the Slovak Republic.

The inhabitants farmed but were mainly engaged in pottery, producing ceramics, fireproof bricks and roof tiles; the name Hrnčiarske Zalussany (potters' Zalužany) appears in 1773. Pottery production continues in the village through the production cooperative Šamotka and several private craftsmen.

== Population ==
Population statistic (10 years)
| Year | 1995 | 2005 | 2015 | 2025 |
|---|---|---|---|---|
| Count | 866 | 870 | 875 | 799 |
| Difference | | +0.46% | +0.57% | −8.68% |

Population statistic
| Year | 2024 | 2025 |
|---|---|---|
| Count | 812 | 799 |
| Difference | | −1.60% |

It has a population of 799 people (31 December 2025).

=== Ethnicity ===
Census 2021 (1+%)
| Ethnicity | Number | Fraction |
|---|---|---|
| Slovak | 799 | 96.03% |
| Not found out | 19 | 2.28% |
| Hungarian | 12 | 1.44% |
| Total | 832 | |

In year 2021 was 832 people by ethnicity 799 as Slovak, 19 as Not found out, 12 as Hungarian, 6 as Czech, 3 as German, 3 as Other, 2 as Irish, 1 as Jewish and 1 as Italian.

Note on population: The difference values of population numbers in the table "Population statistic" and in the sections "Ethnicity" & "Religion" is caused by the use of various statistical methods.

=== Religion ===
Census 2021 (1+%)
| Religion | Number | Fraction |
|---|---|---|
| Roman Catholic Church | 524 | 62.98% |
| None | 219 | 26.32% |
| Evangelical Church | 38 | 4.57% |
| Not found out | 19 | 2.28% |
| Total | 832 | |

In year 2021 was 832 people by religion 524 from Roman Catholic Church, 219 from None, 38 from Evangelical Church, 19 from Not found out, 8 from Greek Catholic Church, 6 from Other, 5 from Jehovah's Witnesses, 4 from Ad hoc movements, 3 from Paganism and natural spirituality, 2 from Old Catholic Church, 1 from Jewish community, 1 from Calvinist Church, 1 from Eastern Orthodox Church and 1 from Other and not ascertained christian church.

== See also ==
- List of municipalities and towns in Slovakia

== Genealogical resources ==
The records for genealogical research are available at the state archive "Statny Archiv in Banska Bystrica, Slovakia".

- Roman Catholic church records (births/marriages/deaths): 1716–1900 (parish B)
