= Kalinovo =

Kalinovo Kálnó
- Municipality
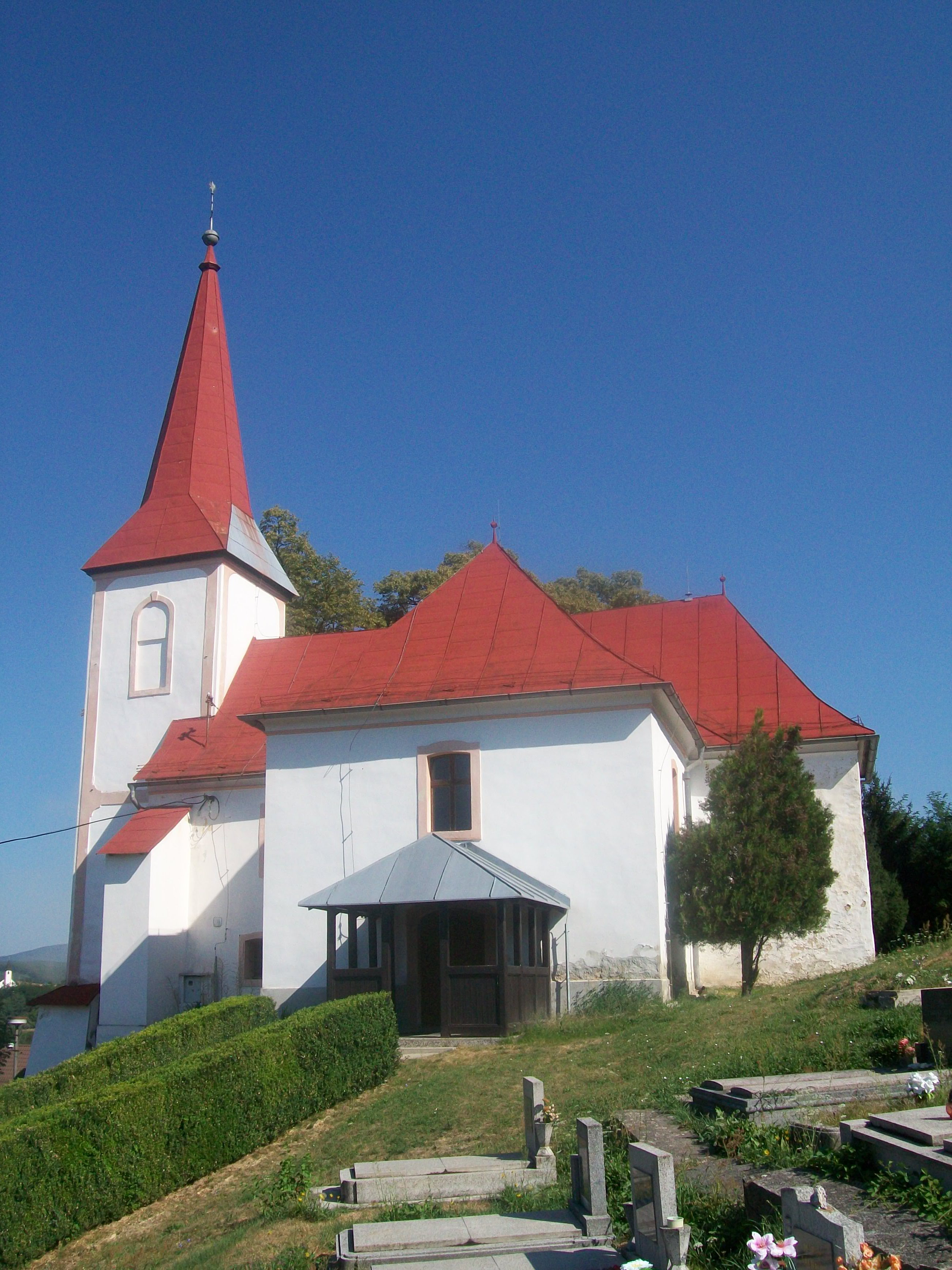
- Lutheran church

- Flag

- Location of Kalinovo in the Banská Bystrica Region Location of Kalinovo in Slovakia
- Coordinates: 48.39°N 19.71°E
- Country: Slovakia
- Region: Banská Bystrica Region
- District: Poltár District
- First mentioned: 1279

Area
  - Total: 39.41 km^{2} (15.22 sq mi)
- Elevation: 212 m (696 ft)

Population (2025)
  - Total: 2,221
- Time zone: UTC+1 (CET)
  - Summer (DST): UTC+2 (CEST)
- Postal code: 985 01
- Area code: +421 47
- Vehicle registration plate (until 2022): PT
- Website: www.kalinovo.sk

Kalinovo (Hungarian: Kálnó) is a small village in Poltár District, in the Banská Bystrica Region of Slovakia.

== Geography ==
The municipality lies at an altitude of 212 metres (696 ft) and covers an area of 39.41 km^{2} (15.22 sq mi) (2025).

== History ==
In historical records the village was first mentioned in 1279. Before the establishment of independent Czechoslovakia in 1918, Kalinovo was part of Nógrád County within the Kingdom of Hungary. From 1939 to 1945, it was part of the Slovak Republic.

== See also ==
- List of municipalities and towns in Slovakia

== Population ==
Population statistic (10 years)
Year	1995	2005	2015	2025
Count	2317	2289	2184	2221
Difference		−1.20%	−4.58%	+1.69%

Population statistic
Year	2024	2025
Count	2253	2221
Difference		−1.42%

It has a population of 2221 people (31 December 2025).

=== Ethnicity ===
Census 2021 (1+ %)
Ethnicity	Number	Fraction
Slovak	2142	96.22%
Not found out	69	3.09%
Total	2226	

In year 2021 was 2226 people by ethnicity 2142 as Slovak, 69 as Not found out, 22 as Hungarian, 7 as Czech, 4 as Russian, 4 as Other, 3 as Romani, 2 as Jewish, 1 as Vietnamese and 1 as Silesian.

Note on population: The difference values of population numbers in the table "Population statistic" and in the sections "Ethnicity" & "Religion" is caused by the use of various statistical methods.

=== Religion ===
Census 2021 (1+ %)
Religion	Number	Fraction
Roman Catholic Church	1043	46.86%
None	614	27.58%
Evangelical Church	443	19.9%
Not found out	73	3.28%
Total	2226	

In year 2021 was 2226 people by religion 1043 from Roman Catholic Church, 614 from None, 443 from Evangelical Church, 73 from Not found out, 14 from Church of the Brethren, 10 from Greek Catholic Church, 7 from Other and not ascertained christian church, 6 from Ad hoc movements, 3 from Baptists Church, 2 from Jehovah's Witnesses, 2 from Christian Congregations in Slovakia, 2 from Islam, 2 from Seventh-day Adventist Church, 1 from Jewish community, 1 from Eastern Orthodox Church, 1 from Hinduism, 1 from United Methodist Church and 1 from Buddhism.

== Genealogical resources ==
The records for genealogical research are available at the state archive "Statny Archiv in Banska Bystrica, Slovakia" The Lutheran Church Records are available online via FamilySearch.org.

- Roman Catholic church records (births/marriages/deaths): 1776-1905 (parish B)
- Lutheran church records (births/marriages/deaths): 1734-1897 (parish A)
