= Mládzovo =

Mládzovo Nemesfalva
- Municipality
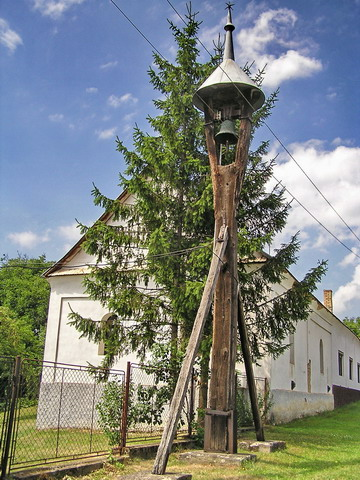
- Local belfry

- Location of Mládzovo in the Banská Bystrica Region Location of Mládzovo in Slovakia
- Coordinates: 48.43°N 19.70°E
- Country: Slovakia
- Region: Banská Bystrica Region
- District: Poltár District
- First mentioned: 1436

Area
  - Total: 7.97 km^{2} (3.08 sq mi)
- Elevation: 235 m (771 ft)

Population (2025)
  - Total: 131
- Time zone: UTC+1 (CET)
  - Summer (DST): UTC+2 (CEST)
- Postal code: 985 02
- Area code: +421 47
- Vehicle registration plate (until 2022): PT
- Website: mladzovo.sk

Mládzovo (Hungarian: Nemesfalva) is a village and municipality in the Poltár District in the Banská Bystrica Region of Slovakia. In the village is local library, foodstuff store and inhabitants are connected to gas network.

== Geography ==
The municipality lies at an altitude of 235 metres (771 ft) and covers an area of 7.97 km^{2} (3.08 sq mi) (2025).

== History ==
Before the establishment of independent Czechoslovakia in 1918, Mládzovo was part of Nógrád County within the Kingdom of Hungary. From 1939 to 1945, it was part of the Slovak Republic.

== Population ==
Population statistic (10 years)
Year	1995	2005	2015	2025
Count	116	106	102	131
Difference		−8.62%	−3.77%	+28.43%

Population statistic
Year	2024	2025
Count	122	131
Difference		+7.37%

It has a population of 131 people (31 December 2025).

=== Ethnicity ===
Census 2021 (1+ %)
Ethnicity	Number	Fraction
Slovak	100	99%
Total	101	

In year 2021 was 101 people by ethnicity 100 as Slovak and 1 as Not found out.

Note on population: The difference values of population numbers in the table "Population statistic" and in the sections "Ethnicity" & "Religion" is caused by the use of various statistical methods.

=== Religion ===
Census 2021 (1+ %)
Religion	Number	Fraction
None	37	36.63%
Roman Catholic Church	35	34.65%
Evangelical Church	27	26.73%
Total	101	

In year 2021 was 101 people by religion 37 from None, 35 from Roman Catholic Church, 27 from Evangelical Church, 1 from Not found out and 1 from Greek Catholic Church.
