= Ozdín =

Ozdín Ozdin
- Municipality
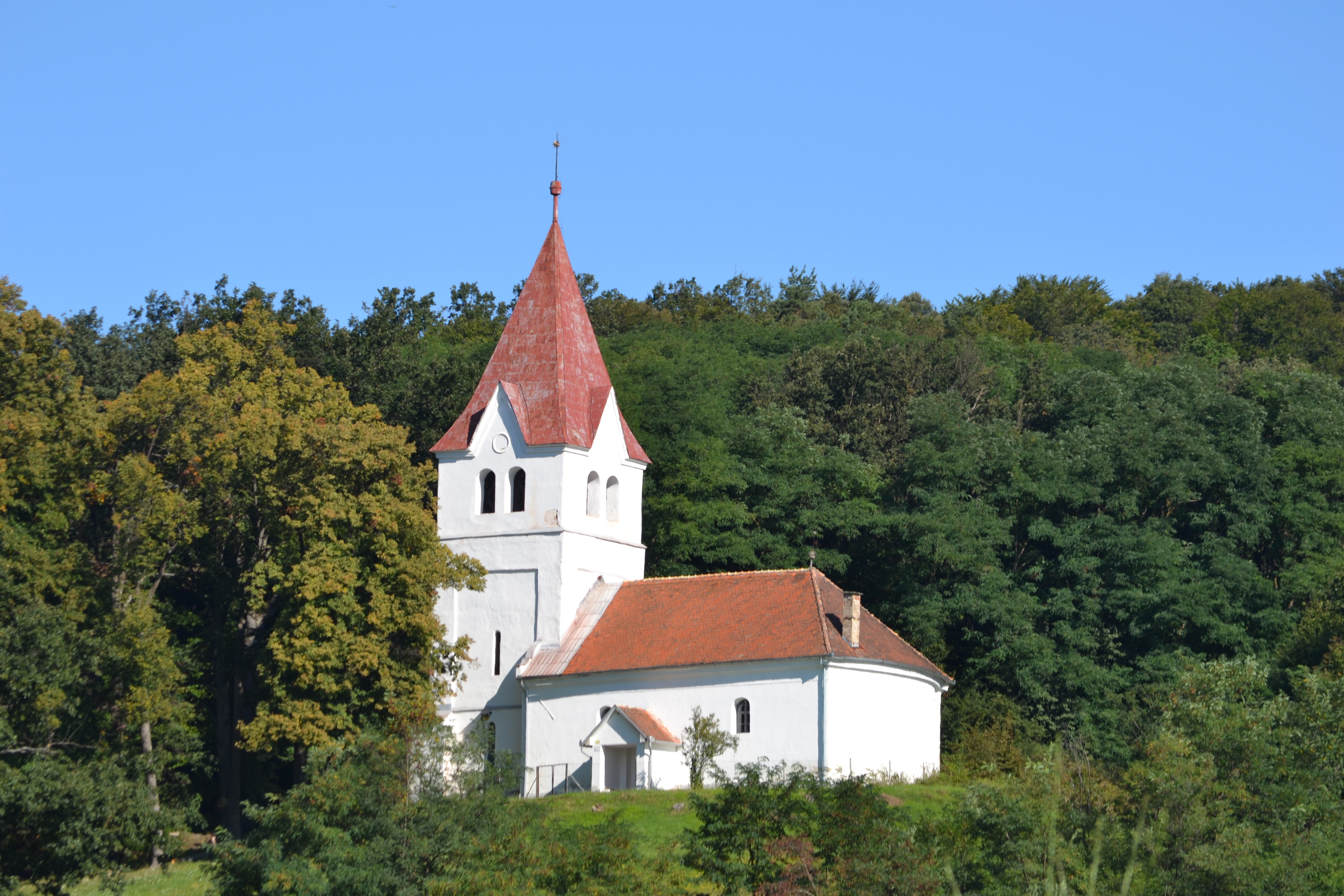
- Church of Ozdín

- Flag

- Location of Ozdín in the Banská Bystrica Region Location of Ozdín in Slovakia
- Coordinates: 48.47°N 19.68°E
- Country: Slovakia
- Region: Banská Bystrica Region
- District: Poltár District
- First mentioned: 1279

Area
  - Total: 15.21 km^{2} (5.87 sq mi)
- Elevation: 286 m (938 ft)

Population (2025)
  - Total: 270
- Time zone: UTC+1 (CET)
  - Summer (DST): UTC+2 (CEST)
- Postal code: 985 24
- Area code: +421 47
- Vehicle registration plate (until 2022): PT
- Website: www.ozdin.sk

Ozdín (Hungarian: Ozdin, German: Ossden) is a village and municipality in the Poltár District in the Banská Bystrica Region of Slovakia.

== Geography ==
The municipality lies at an altitude of 286 metres (938 ft) and covers an area of 15.21 km^{2} (5.87 sq mi) (2025).

== History ==
Before the establishment of independent Czechoslovakia in 1918, Ozdín was part of Nógrád County within the Kingdom of Hungary. From 1939 to 1945, it was part of the Slovak Republic.

== Population ==
Population statistic (10 years)
Year	1995	2005	2015	2025
Count	356	370	321	270
Difference		+3.93%	−13.24%	−15.88%

Population statistic
Year	2024	2025
Count	274	270
Difference		−1.45%

It has a population of 270 people (31 December 2025).

=== Ethnicity ===
Census 2021 (1+ %)
Ethnicity	Number	Fraction
Slovak	284	98.61%
Not found out	5	1.73%
Hungarian	3	1.04%
Total	288	

In year 2021 was 288 people by ethnicity 284 as Slovak, 5 as Not found out, 3 as Hungarian, 2 as Other, 1 as Czech and 1 as Russian.

Note on population: The difference values of population numbers in the table "Population statistic" and in the sections "Ethnicity" & "Religion" is caused by the use of various statistical methods.

=== Religion ===
Census 2021 (1+ %)
Religion	Number	Fraction
Roman Catholic Church	124	43.06%
Evangelical Church	100	34.72%
None	49	17.01%
Christian Congregations in Slovakia	7	2.43%
Greek Catholic Church	3	1.04%
Total	288	

In year 2021 was 288 people by religion 124 from Roman Catholic Church, 100 from Evangelical Church, 49 from None, 7 from Christian Congregations in Slovakia, 3 from Greek Catholic Church, 2 from Not found out, 1 from Eastern Orthodox Church, 1 from Jehovah's Witnesses and 1 from Ad hoc movements.
