= Sušany =

Sušany Susány
- Municipality
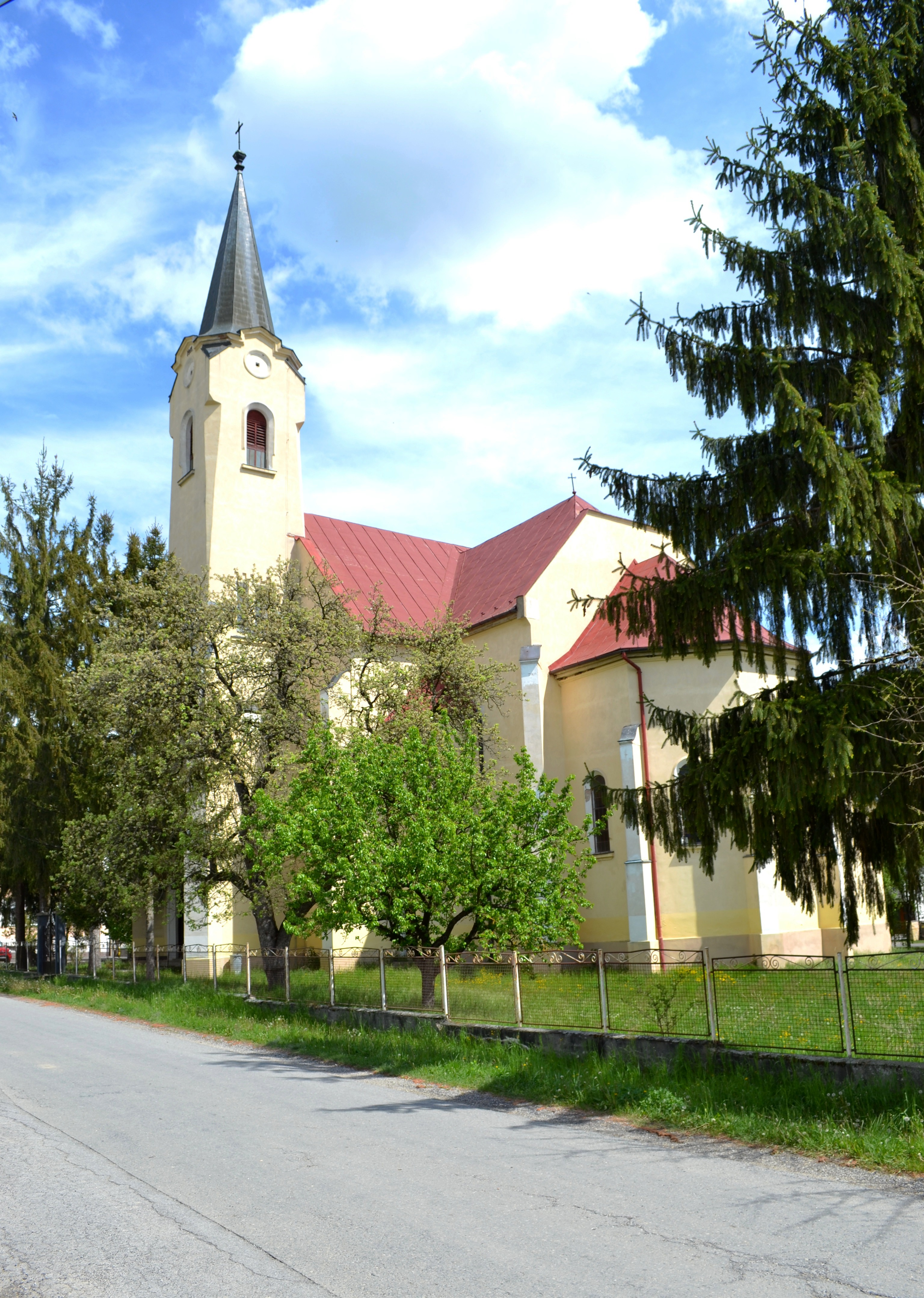

- Flag

- Location of Sušany in the Banská Bystrica Region Location of Sušany in Slovakia
- Coordinates: 48.41°N 19.89°E
- Country: Slovakia
- Region: Banská Bystrica Region
- District: Poltár District
- First mentioned: 1407

Area
  - Total: 12.94 km^{2} (5.00 sq mi)
- Elevation: 219 m (719 ft)

Population (2025)
  - Total: 412
- Time zone: UTC+1 (CET)
  - Summer (DST): UTC+2 (CEST)
- Postal code: 980 12
- Area code: +421 47
- Vehicle registration plate (until 2022): PT
- Website: www.susany.sk

Sušany (Hungarian: Susány) is a village in the Poltár District of Slovakia. The village lies in the southern part of the historic area of Malohont, in the valley of the small river Suchá.

== History ==
The first written notice about the village is from 1407, where it is mentioned as a property of Mikofalvy family. Before the establishment of independent Czechoslovakia in 1918, Sušany was part of Gömör and Kishont County within the Kingdom of Hungary. From 1939 to 1945, it was part of the Slovak Republic.

The art of pottery along with agriculture have been the main source of income for local people since the first settlements in the Bronze Age. However, in 1950s the last pottery kiln, called bana, was closed. Considerable part of extant products is kept in the pottery collection in Sušany, placed in the municipal office.

== Geography ==
The municipality lies at an altitude of 219 metres (719 ft) and covers an area of 12.94 km^{2} (5.00 sq mi) (2025).

== Population ==
Population statistic (10 years)
Year	1995	2005	2015	2025
Count	476	444	429	412
Difference		−6.72%	−3.37%	−3.96%

Population statistic
Year	2024	2025
Count	420	412
Difference		−1.90%

It has a population of 412 people (31 December 2025).

=== Ethnicity ===
Census 2021 (1+ %)
Ethnicity	Number	Fraction
Slovak	407	97.36%
Not found out	8	1.91%
Total	418	

In year 2021 was 418 people by ethnicity 407 as Slovak, 8 as Not found out, 3 as Czech, 3 as Hungarian and 1 as Polish.

Note on population: The difference values of population numbers in the table "Population statistic" and in the sections "Ethnicity" & "Religion" is caused by the use of various statistical methods.

=== Religion ===
Census 2021 (1+ %)
Religion	Number	Fraction
Roman Catholic Church	246	58.85%
None	142	33.97%
Evangelical Church	16	3.83%
Not found out	6	1.44%
Total	418	

In year 2021 was 418 people by religion 246 from Roman Catholic Church, 142 from None, 16 from Evangelical Church, 6 from Not found out, 2 from Christian Congregations in Slovakia, 2 from Buddhism, 1 from Islam, 1 from Greek Catholic Church, 1 from United Methodist Church and 1 from Ad hoc movements.

== Sightseeings ==
The dominating feature of the village is classicist Roman Catholic Saint Anne Church, built in 1911. In the centre there is a municipal park with a World War II memorial. Another feature of the area is the well-preserved popular architecture represented by peasant houses from the beginning of 19th century.
