= Hrnčiarska Ves =

Hrnčiarska Ves Cserepes
- Municipality
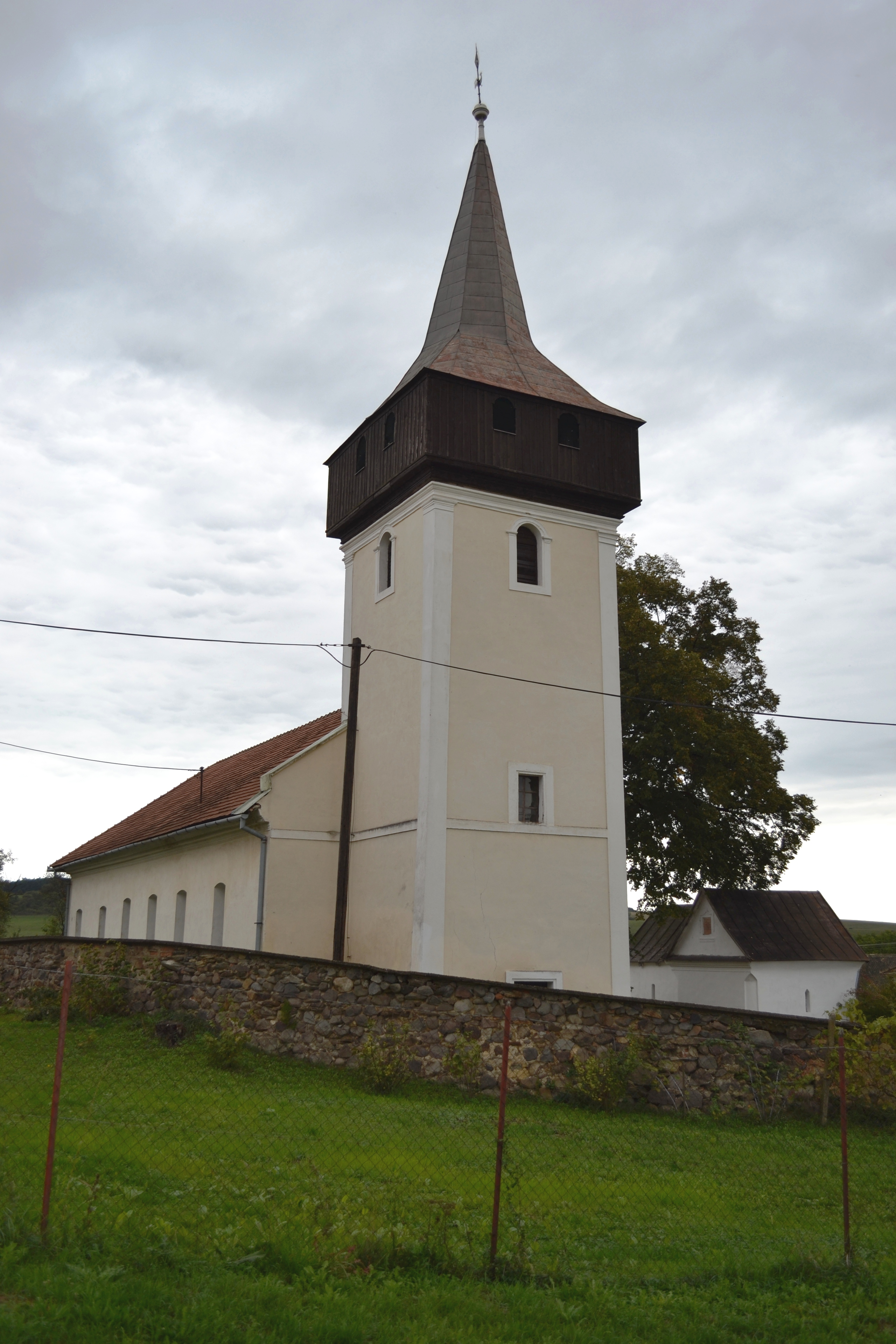

- Flag

- Location of Hrnčiarska Ves in the Banská Bystrica Region Location of Hrnčiarska Ves in Slovakia
- Coordinates: 48.43°N 19.85°E
- Country: Slovakia
- Region: Banská Bystrica Region
- District: Poltár District
- First mentioned: 1285

Area
  - Total: 25.77 km^{2} (9.95 sq mi)
- Elevation: 236 m (774 ft)

Population (2025)
  - Total: 954
- Time zone: UTC+1 (CET)
  - Summer (DST): UTC+2 (CEST)
- Postal code: 980 13
- Area code: +421 47
- Vehicle registration plate (until 2022): PT
- Website: www.hrnciarskaves.sk

Hrnčiarska Ves (Hungarian: Cserepes) is a village and municipality in the Poltár District in the Banská Bystrica Region of Slovakia.

== Geography ==
The municipality lies at an altitude of 236 metres (774 ft) and covers an area of 25.77 km^{2} (9.95 sq mi) (2025).

== History ==
Before the establishment of independent Czechoslovakia in 1918, Hrnčiarska Ves was part of Gömör and Kishont County within the Kingdom of Hungary. From 1939 to 1945, it was part of the Slovak Republic.

== Population ==
Population statistic (10 years)
| Year | 1995 | 2005 | 2015 | 2025 |
|---|---|---|---|---|
| Count | 898 | 973 | 1000 | 954 |
| Difference | | +8.35% | +2.77% | −4.6% |

Population statistic
| Year | 2024 | 2025 |
|---|---|---|
| Count | 936 | 954 |
| Difference | | +1.92% |

It has a population of 954 people (31 December 2025).

=== Ethnicity ===
Census 2021 (1+ %)
| Ethnicity | Number | Fraction |
|---|---|---|
| Slovak | 885 | 91.7% |
| Not found out | 74 | 7.66% |
| Romani | 33 | 3.41% |
| Total | 965 | |

In year 2021 was 965 people by ethnicity 885 as Slovak, 74 as Not found out, 33 as Romani, 8 as Other, 5 as Czech, 5 as Hungarian, 1 as Silesian, 1 as Rusyn, 1 as Russian and 1 as Moravian.

Note on population: The difference values of population numbers in the table "Population statistic" and in the sections "Ethnicity" & "Religion" is caused by the use of various statistical methods.

=== Religion ===
Census 2021 (1+ %)
| Religion | Number | Fraction |
|---|---|---|
| Roman Catholic Church | 618 | 64.04% |
| None | 177 | 18.34% |
| Evangelical Church | 84 | 8.7% |
| Not found out | 68 | 7.05% |
| Total | 965 | |

In year 2021 was 965 people by religion 618 from Roman Catholic Church, 177 from None, 84 from Evangelical Church, 68 from Not found out, 5 from Greek Catholic Church, 4 from Jehovah's Witnesses, 3 from Other, 1 from Calvinist Church, 1 from Paganism and natural spirituality, 1 from Christian Congregations in Slovakia, 1 from United Methodist Church, 1 from Buddhism and 1 from Ad hoc movements.

== Genealogical resources ==
The records for genealogical research are available at the state archive "Statny Archiv in Banska Bystrica, Slovakia"

== See also ==
- List of municipalities and towns in Slovakia
