= Poltár District =

Coordinates: 48°25′56″N 19°47′36″E

- District
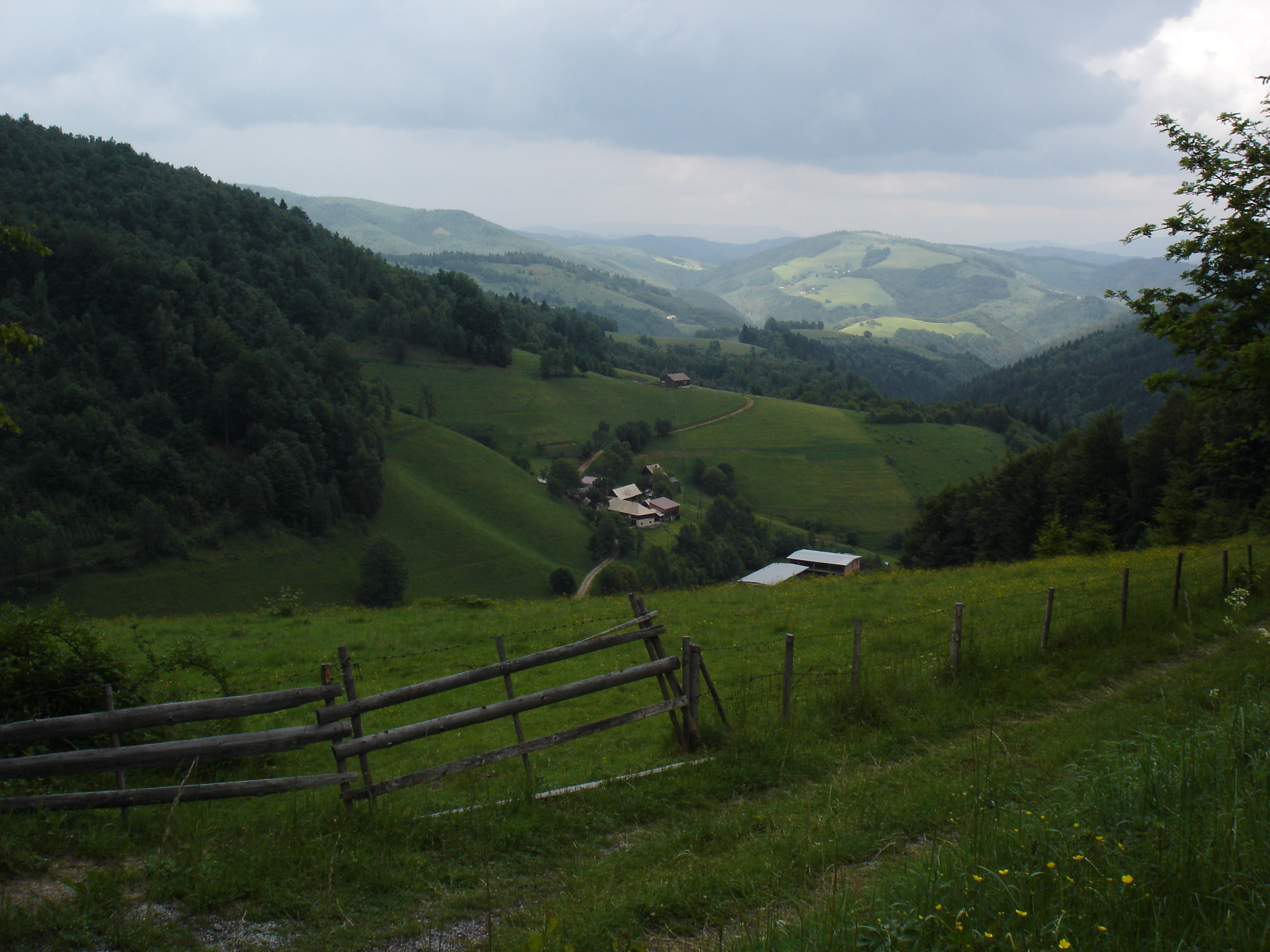
- Country: Slovakia
- Region (kraj): Banská Bystrica Region
- Seat: Poltár

Area
  - Total: 476.28 km^{2} (183.89 sq mi)

Population (2025)
  - Total: 19,951
- Time zone: UTC+1 (CET)
  - Summer (DST): UTC+2 (CEST)
- Telephone prefix: 047
- Vehicle registration plate (until 2022): PT
- Municipalities: 22

Poltár District (Slovak: okres Poltár) is a district in the south of the Banská Bystrica Region of central Slovakia. It was established in 1996. In its present borders exists from 2002, when municipalities Pinciná and Nové Hony were assigned to the Lučenec District. It is the sixth smallest district in Slovakia. Poltár District consists of 22 municipalities, from which one has a town status.

== Population ==
Population statistic (10 years)
Year	1995	2005	2015	2025
Count	23,147	22,812	21,930	19,951
Difference		−1.44%	−3.86%	−9.02%

Population statistic
Year	2024	2025
Count	20,135	19,951
Difference		−0.91%

It has a population of 19,951 people (31 December 2025).

Historical population
Year	Pop.	±%
1970	25,748	—
1980	24,831	−3.6%
1991	23,454	−5.5%
2001	23,202	−1.1%
2011	22,545	−2.8%
2021	20,634	−8.5%
Source: Statistical Office of the Slovak Republic

=== Ethnicity ===
Census 2021 (1+ %)
Ethnicity	Number	Fraction
Slovak	19,545	91.99%
Not found out	928	4.36%
Romani	386	1.81%
Total	21,246	

In year 2021 was 21,246 people by ethnicity 19,545 as Slovak, 928 as Not found out, 386 as Romani, 117 as Hungarian, 95 as Czech, 45 as Other, 41 as Russian, 15 as German, 11 as Vietnamese, 11 as Rusyn, 9 as Polish, 7 as Jewish, 7 as Austrian, 6 as Serbian, 4 as Ukrainian, 3 as Irish, 3 as Italian, 3 as Romanian, 2 as Silesian, 2 as Croatian, 1 as Turkish, 1 as Moravian, 1 as Greek, 1 as French, 1 as English and 1 as Albanian.

Note on population: The difference values of population numbers in the table "Population statistic" and in the sections "Ethnicity" & "Religion" is caused by the use of various statistical methods.

=== Religion ===
Census 2021 (1+ %)
Religion	Number	Fraction
Roman Catholic Church	9478	45.93%
None	5954	28.86%
Evangelical Church	3651	17.69%
Not found out	1011	4.9%
Total	20,634	

In year 2021 was 20,634 people by religion 9478 from Roman Catholic Church, 5954 from None, 3651 from Evangelical Church, 1011 from Not found out, 133 from Greek Catholic Church, 94 from Baptists Church, 51 from Ad hoc movements, 39 from Other, 34 from Jehovah's Witnesses, 29 from Other and not ascertained christian church, 26 from Christian Congregations in Slovakia, 22 from Paganism and natural spirituality, 18 from Calvinist Church, 16 from Eastern Orthodox Church, 16 from United Methodist Church, 16 from Buddhism, 14 from Church of the Brethren, 9 from Old Catholic Church, 7 from Islam, 5 from Hinduism, 5 from Seventh-day Adventist Church, 4 from Jewish community, 1 from Czechoslovak Hussite Church and 1 from Apostolic Church.

== Municipalities ==
Municipality	Area [km^{2}]	Population
Breznička	9.38	731
Cinobaňa	39.22	1,962
České Brezovo	38.92	435
Ďubákovo	6.39	82
Hradište	14.56	219
Hrnčiarska Ves	25.77	954
Hrnčiarske Zalužany	6.09	799
Kalinovo	39.41	2,221
Kokava nad Rimavicou	66.42	2,677
Krná	14.01	49
Málinec	49.99	1,387
Mládzovo	7.97	131
Ozdín	15.21	270
Poltár	30.52	5,080
Rovňany	9.58	232
Selce	24.40	120
Sušany	12.94	412
Šoltýska	4.39	70
Uhorské	24.48	475
Utekáč	26.94	812
Veľká Ves	9.80	410
Zlatno	0.00	423

Population and area values are current for year 2025.
