= Uhorské =

Uhorské Ipolymagyari
- Municipality
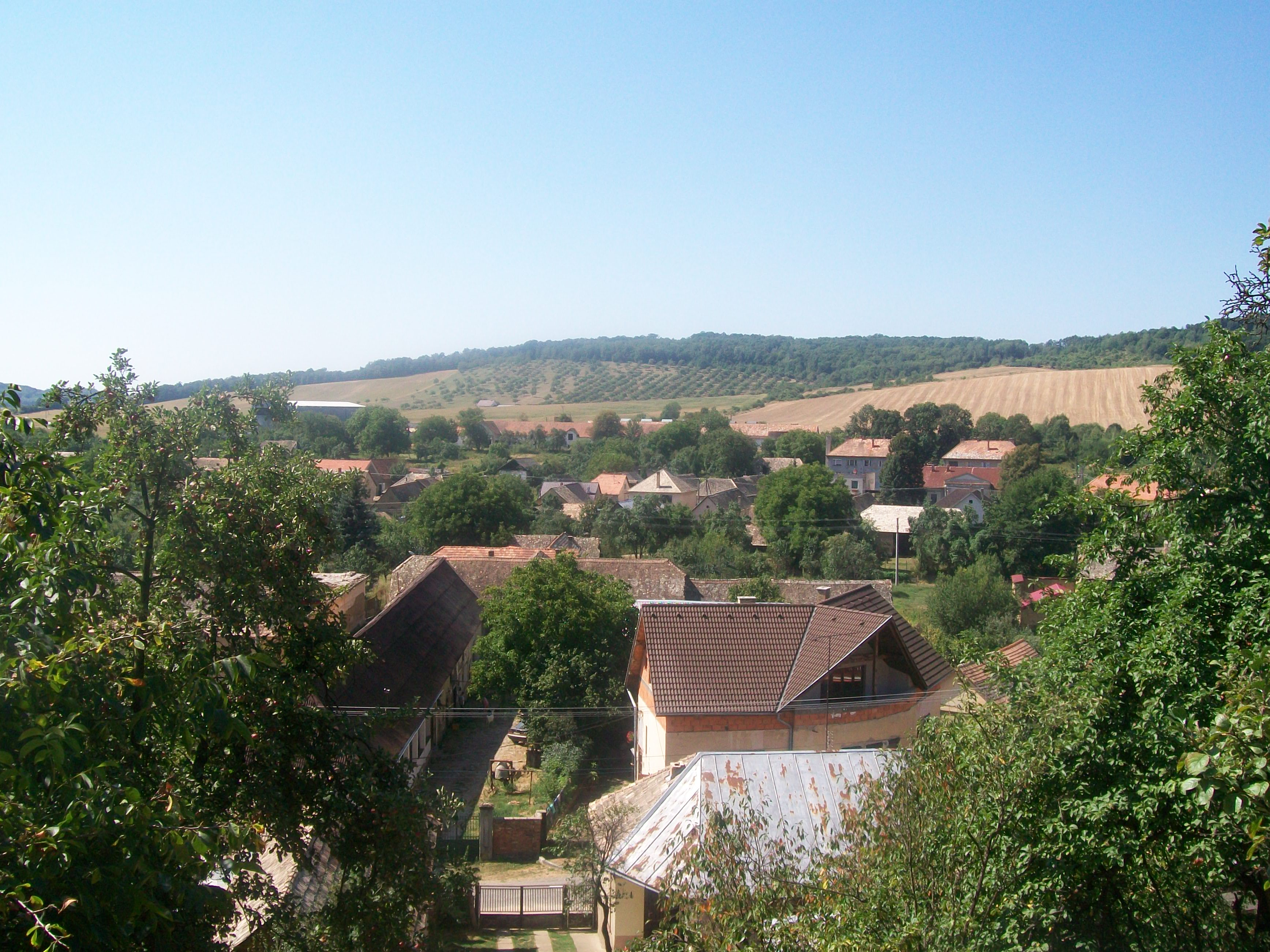

- Flag

- Location of Uhorské in the Banská Bystrica Region Location of Uhorské in Slovakia
- Coordinates: 48.47°N 19.75°E
- Country: Slovakia
- Region: Banská Bystrica Region
- District: Poltár District
- First mentioned: 1435

Area
  - Total: 24.48 km^{2} (9.45 sq mi)
- Elevation: 251 m (823 ft)

Population (2025)
  - Total: 475
- Time zone: UTC+1 (CET)
  - Summer (DST): UTC+2 (CEST)
- Postal code: 985 25
- Area code: +421 47
- Vehicle registration plate (until 2022): PT
- Website: www.uhorske.sk

Uhorské (Hungarian: Ipolymagyari) is a village and municipality in the Poltár District in the Banská Bystrica Region of Slovakia. In the village, there is a football pitch, a grocery store, a post office, a library, a kindergarten and an elementary school. The village has retained its agricultural characteristics. The most significant sight is an evangelical church from 1700, which stands under state cultural protection.

== Geography ==
The municipality lies at an altitude of 251 metres (823 ft) and covers an area of 24.48 km^{2} (9.45 sq mi) (2025).

== History ==
Before the establishment of independent Czechoslovakia in 1918, Uhorské was part of Nógrád County within the Kingdom of Hungary. From 1939 to 1945, it was part of the Slovak Republic.

== Population ==
Population statistic (10 years)
Year	1995	2005	2015	2025
Count	557	591	542	475
Difference		+6.10%	−8.29%	−12.36%

Population statistic
Year	2024	2025
Count	494	475
Difference		−3.84%

It has a population of 475 people (31 December 2025).

=== Ethnicity ===
Census 2021 (1+ %)
Ethnicity	Number	Fraction
Slovak	496	96.31%
Not found out	17	3.3%
Total	515	

In year 2021 was 515 people by ethnicity 496 as Slovak, 17 as Not found out, 5 as Hungarian, 4 as Other, 1 as Czech, 1 as Romani and 1 as Russian.

Note on population: The difference values of population numbers in the table "Population statistic" and in the sections "Ethnicity" & "Religion" is caused by the use of various statistical methods.

=== Religion ===
Census 2021 (1+ %)
Religion	Number	Fraction
Roman Catholic Church	241	46.8%
Evangelical Church	137	26.6%
None	114	22.14%
Not found out	16	3.11%
Total	515	

In year 2021 was 515 people by religion 241 from Roman Catholic Church, 137 from Evangelical Church, 114 from None, 16 from Not found out, 2 from Christian Congregations in Slovakia, 2 from Baptists Church, 1 from Calvinist Church, 1 from Other and not ascertained christian church and 1 from Hinduism.
