= Krná =

Krná Kiskorna
- Municipality
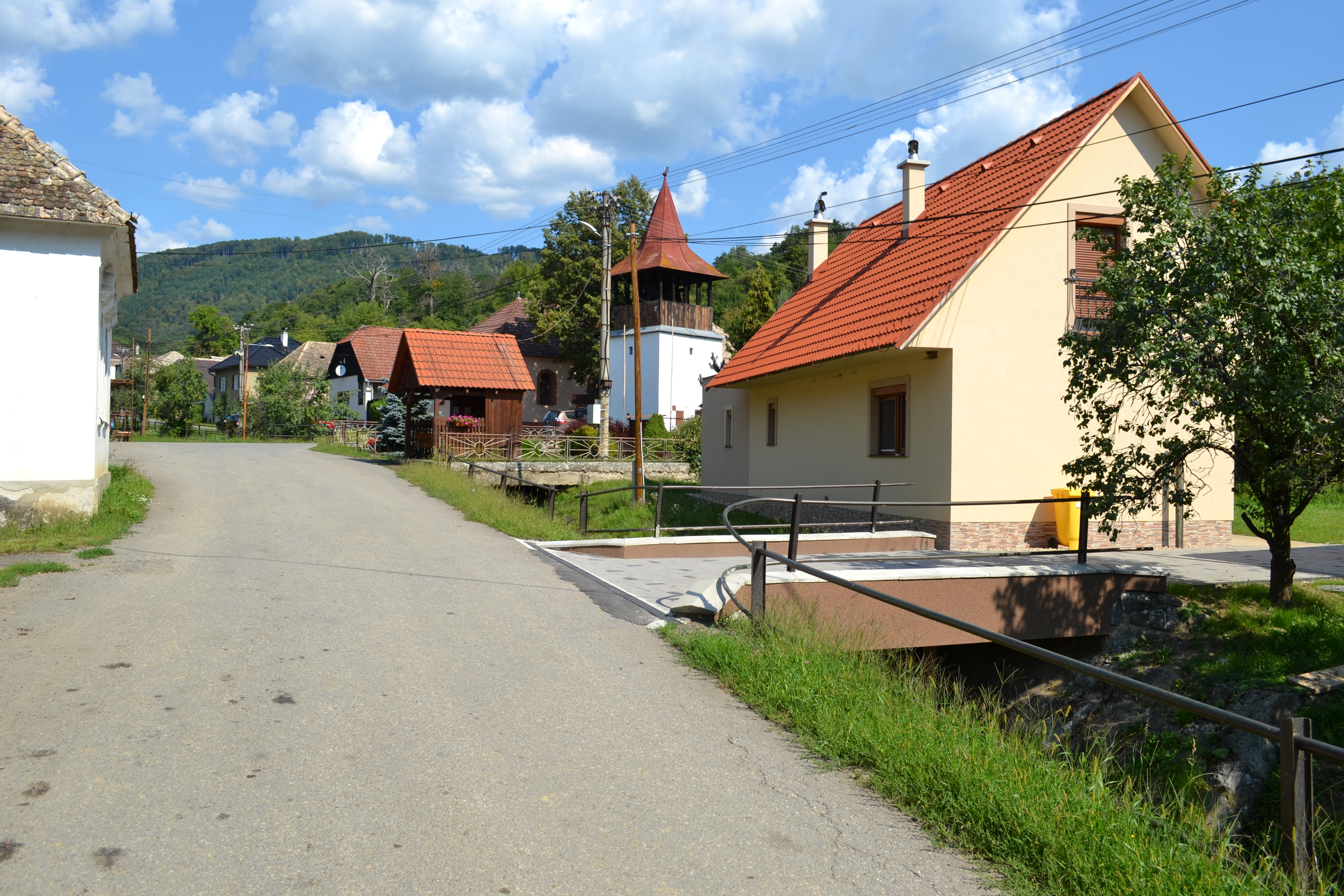

- Flag

- Location of Krná in the Banská Bystrica Region Location of Krná in Slovakia
- Coordinates: 48.50°N 19.73°E
- Country: Slovakia
- Region: Banská Bystrica Region
- District: Poltár District
- First mentioned: 1573

Area
  - Total: 14.01 km^{2} (5.41 sq mi)
- Elevation: 318 m (1,043 ft)

Population (2025)
  - Total: 49
- Time zone: UTC+1 (CET)
  - Summer (DST): UTC+2 (CEST)
- Postal code: 985 25
- Area code: +421 47
- Vehicle registration plate (until 2022): PT
- Website: www.krna.sk

Krná (Hungarian: Kiskorna) is a village and municipality in the Poltár District in the Banská Bystrica Region of Slovakia. In respect to population it belongs to the smallest municipalities in Slovakia. In the village is public library and the dwellings are connected to the public water supply net.

== Geography ==
The municipality lies at an altitude of 318 metres (1,043 ft) and covers an area of 14.01 km^{2} (5.41 sq mi) (2025).

== History ==
Before the establishment of independent Czechoslovakia in 1918, Krná was part of Nógrád County within the Kingdom of Hungary. From 1939 to 1945, it was part of the Slovak Republic.

== Population ==
Population statistic (10 years)
Year	1995	2005	2015	2025
Count	92	61	50	49
Difference		−33.69%	−18.03%	−2%

Population statistic
Year	2024	2025
Count	49	49
Difference		+0%

It has a population of 49 people (31 December 2025).

=== Ethnicity ===
Census 2021 (1+ %)
Ethnicity	Number	Fraction
Slovak	47	87.03%
Other	4	7.4%
Hungarian	2	3.7%
Russian	1	1.85%
Not found out	1	1.85%
Total	54	

In year 2021 was 54 people by ethnicity 47 as Slovak, 4 as Other, 2 as Hungarian, 1 as Russian and 1 as Not found out.

Note on population: The difference values of population numbers in the table "Population statistic" and in the sections "Ethnicity" & "Religion" is caused by the use of various statistical methods.

=== Religion ===
Census 2021 (1+ %)
Religion	Number	Fraction
None	20	37.04%
Roman Catholic Church	15	27.78%
Evangelical Church	14	25.93%
Greek Catholic Church	2	3.7%
Buddhism	2	3.7%
Other	1	1.85%
Total	54	

In year 2021 was 54 people by religion 20 from None, 15 from Roman Catholic Church, 14 from Evangelical Church, 2 from Greek Catholic Church, 2 from Buddhism and 1 from Other.
