= Poltár =

- Municipality
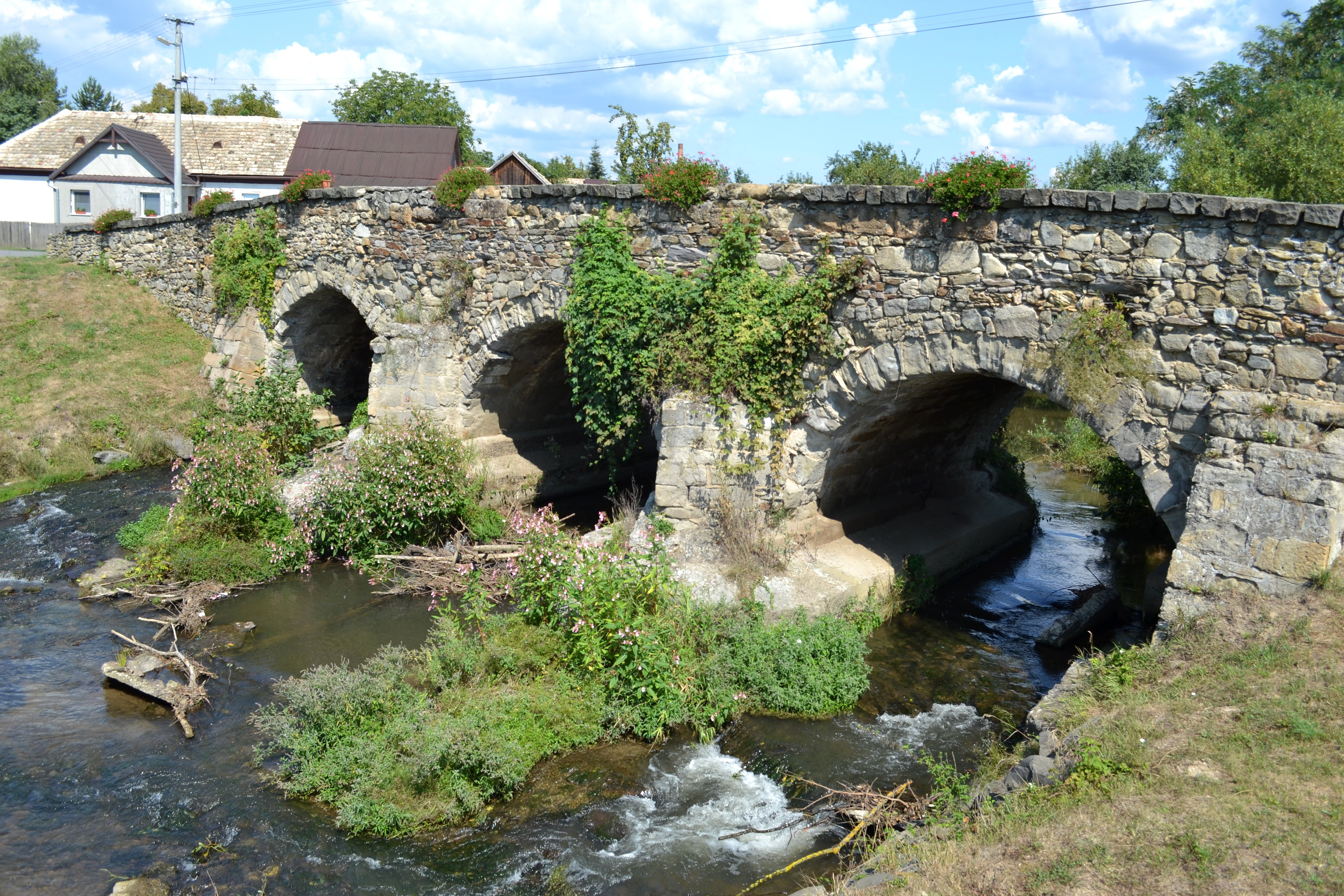
- Turkish bridge in Poltár

- Flag Coat of arms

- Location of Poltár in the Banská Bystrica Region Location of Poltár in Slovakia
- Coordinates: 48.43°N 19.80°E
- Country: Slovakia
- Region: Banská Bystrica Region
- District: Poltár District
- First mentioned: 1330

Government
  - Mayor: Peter Sitor

Area
  - Total: 30.52 km^{2} (11.78 sq mi)
- Elevation: 242 m (794 ft)

Population (2025)
  - Total: 5,080
- Time zone: UTC+1 (CET)
  - Summer (DST): UTC+2 (CEST)
- Postal code: 987 01
- Area code: +421 47
- Vehicle registration plate (until 2022): PT
- Website: www.poltar.sk

Poltár is a town and municipality in the Poltár District in the Banská Bystrica Region of Slovakia.

== Geography ==
The municipality lies at an altitude of 242 metres (794 ft) and covers an area of 30.52 km^{2} (11.78 sq mi) (2025).

The town is located in the Southern Slovak basin near the river Ipeľ, south of the Revúcka Hills, which is part of the Slovak Ore Mountains, around 18 km (11.18 mi) from Lučenec.

== History ==
There were historical Slavic remains of ancient housing, probably from the 7th century. After that remains of small medieval castle are part of Poltár's history, found in the general area and in the town part of Kostolisko (Literally meaning "Place of Church") there are remains of romancatholic church. Poltár was first mentioned in 1246 as silva Polta. Some other names are Nagpolthar, Felsupolthar, Kyspoltar, Varalyapolthar (1409) and Polthar (1439). In the 16th century the town was divided into Horný Poltár and Dolný Poltár. In the same general time, it was occupied by the Ottomans (between 1554 and 1593). In the year 1828 there were only mere 83 houses and 56 citizens. In the same timeframe, the town of Poltár was very agricultural, which wasn't profitable for the town. From 1869 and onwards, the factory of Barratt-Dragon was built, with its primary focus being the creation of bricks and tiles. Before the establishment of independent Czechoslovakia in 1918, Poltár was part of Nógrád County within the Kingdom of Hungary. From 1939 to 1945, it was part of the Slovak Republic.

From 1922, a steam sawmill was built, but burnt down fourteen years later in 1936. The citizens of Poltár were also very active in the Slovak National Uprising. In the year 1966 Poltár joins the towns of Slaná lehota and Zelené, receiving the city privileges.

=== Parts of Poltár ===
Podháj - built during the late medieval era by the Sóós family. It was destroyed during the Ottoman occupation during 1554-1562. It was rebuilt around the 17th century, but only as a small village.

Prievrana - built during the late medieval era. It was destroyed during the multiple military actions in the area roughly around 1610. It was rebuilt in the 17th century, only as a small village. Its other names (mainly Hungarian) were Prenna and Perenna.

Slaná Lehota - built in the second half of the 14th century. The town was owned by Fiľakovo. Between the years 1554-1593 it was occupied by the Ottomans. After that, in 1598 the Sóós family became the owners. In 17th and 18th century Geczy family became the owners. In the year 1828 it had 23 houses and 130 citizens.

Zelené - Founded approximately in the 14th century. It was owned by many families during its history. It was occupied by the Ottomans in 1554-1593. In the year 1828 it had 28 houses and 274 citizens. The town helped the Slovak National Uprising movement.

== Population ==
Historical population
Year	Pop.	±%
1970	3,105	—
1980	5,030	+62.0%
1991	5,823	+15.8%
2001	6,099	+4.7%
2011	5,826	−4.5%
2021	5,333	−8.5%
Source: Censuses

Population statistic (10 years)
Year	1995	2005	2015	2025
Count	5951	5929	5738	5080
Difference		−0.36%	−3.22%	−11.46%

Population statistic
Year	2024	2025
Count	5123	5080
Difference		−0.83%

It has a population of 5080 people (31 December 2025).

=== Ethnicity ===
Census 2021 (1+ %)
Ethnicity	Number	Fraction
Slovak	4923	92.31%
Not found out	378	7.08%
Romani	55	1.03%
Total	5333	

In year 2021 was 5333 people by ethnicity 4923 as Slovak, 378 as Not found out, 55 as Romani, 25 as Hungarian, 22 as Czech, 12 as Russian, 9 as Vietnamese, 6 as Rusyn, 5 as Austrian, 5 as Other, 3 as Polish, 3 as German, 2 as Jewish, 2 as Ukrainian, 2 as Serbian, 2 as Romanian, 1 as Irish, 1 as Turkish, 1 as French and 1 as Albanian.

Note on population: The difference values of population numbers in the table "Population statistic" and in the sections "Ethnicity" & "Religion" is caused by the use of various statistical methods.

=== Religion ===
Census 2021 (1+ %)
Religion	Number	Fraction
Roman Catholic Church	2158	40.47%
None	1818	34.09%
Evangelical Church	839	15.73%
Not found out	403	7.56%
Total	5333	

In year 2021 was 5333 people by religion 2158 from Roman Catholic Church, 1818 from None, 839 from Evangelical Church, 403 from Not found out, 38 from Greek Catholic Church, 17 from Ad hoc movements, 12 from Other, 10 from Calvinist Church, 8 from Other and not ascertained christian church, 5 from Eastern Orthodox Church, 5 from Jehovah's Witnesses, 5 from United Methodist Church, 3 from Christian Congregations in Slovakia, 3 from Buddhism, 2 from Paganism and natural spirituality, 2 from Seventh-day Adventist Church, 1 from Jewish community, 1 from Old Catholic Church, 1 from Islam, 1 from Hinduism and 1 from Baptists Church.

== People ==
- Ivan Gašparovič, the former President of Slovakia was born here.
