= Šoltýska =

Šoltýska Újantalfalva
- Municipality
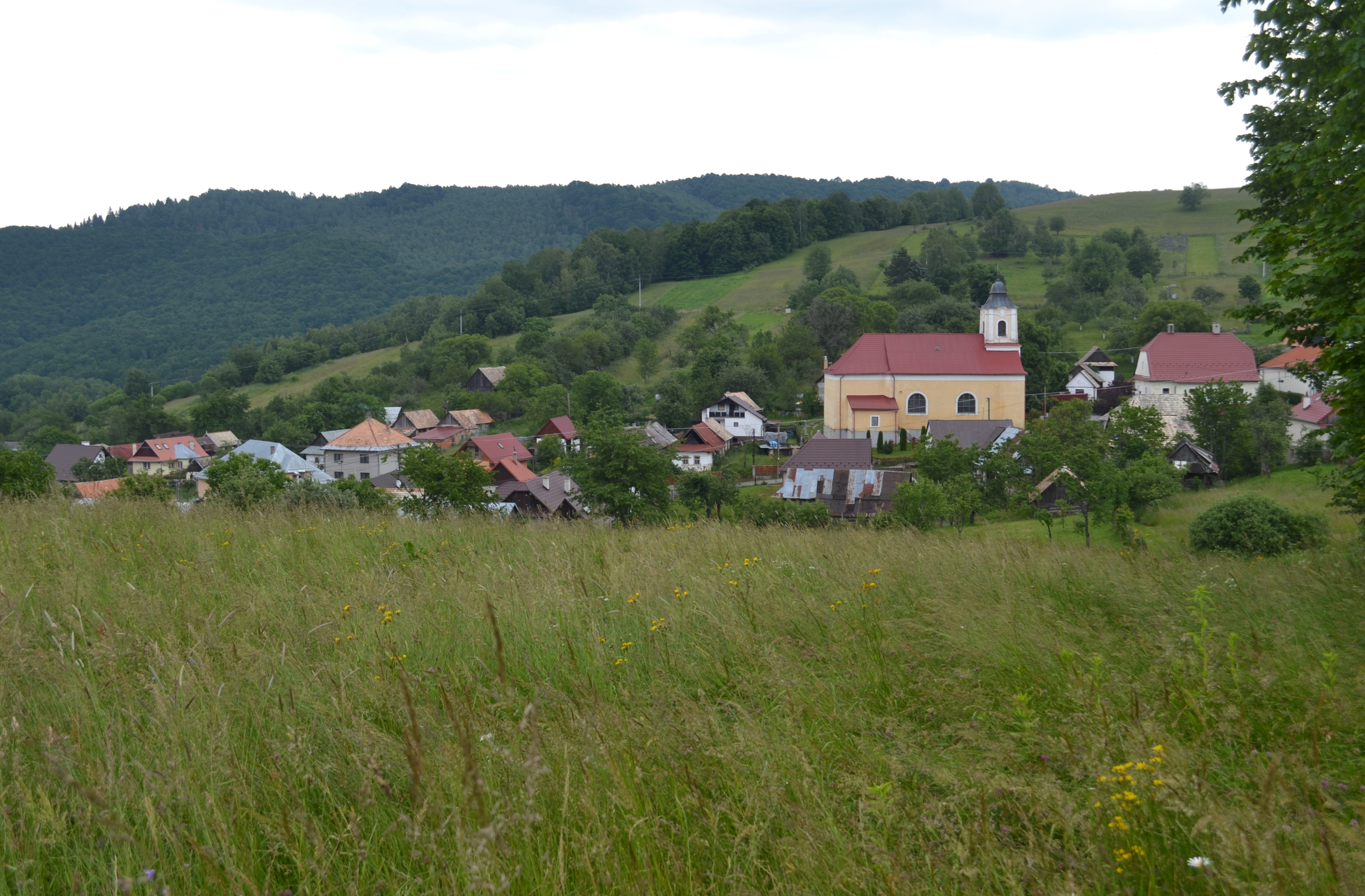

- Flag

- Location of Šoltýska in the Banská Bystrica Region Location of Šoltýska in Slovakia
- Coordinates: 48.58°N 19.74°E
- Country: Slovakia
- Region: Banská Bystrica Region
- District: Poltár District
- First mentioned: 1800

Area
  - Total: 4.39 km^{2} (1.69 sq mi)
- Elevation: 760 m (2,490 ft)

Population (2025)
  - Total: 70
- Time zone: UTC+1 (CET)
  - Summer (DST): UTC+2 (CEST)
- Postal code: 985 07
- Area code: +421 47
- Vehicle registration plate (until 2022): PT
- Website: www.soltyska.sk

Šoltýska (Hungarian: Újantalfalva) is a village and municipality in the Poltár District in the Banská Bystrica Region of Slovakia. The village is located in Slovenské rudohorie mountains. In Šoltýska had been sawmill and watermill in the past. Now the village is mostly touristic location with the chalets inside the village and its neighborhood, that use mostly city holidaymakers during the weekends. In 2012 the village had been location of techno music festival SlovTek .

== Geography ==
The municipality lies at an altitude of 760 metres (2,490 ft) and covers an area of 4.39 km^{2} (1.69 sq mi) (2025).

== History ==
Before the establishment of independent Czechoslovakia in 1918, Šoltýska was part of Gömör and Kishont County within the Kingdom of Hungary. From 1939 to 1945, it was part of the Slovak Republic.

== Population ==
Population statistic (10 years)
| Year | 1995 | 2005 | 2015 | 2025 |
|---|---|---|---|---|
| Count | 156 | 152 | 115 | 70 |
| Difference | | −2.56% | −24.34% | −39.13% |

Population statistic
| Year | 2024 | 2025 |
|---|---|---|
| Count | 71 | 70 |
| Difference | | −1.40% |

It has a population of 70 people (31 December 2025).

=== Ethnicity ===
Census 2021 (1+ %)
| Ethnicity | Number | Fraction |
|---|---|---|
| Slovak | 79 | 91.86% |
| Not found out | 7 | 8.13% |
| Total | 86 | |

In year 2021 was 86 people by ethnicity 79 as Slovak and 7 as Not found out.

Note on population: The difference values of population numbers in the table "Population statistic" and in the sections "Ethnicity" & "Religion" is caused by the use of various statistical methods.

=== Religion ===
Census 2021 (1+ %)
| Religion | Number | Fraction |
|---|---|---|
| Roman Catholic Church | 68 | 79.07% |
| None | 8 | 9.3% |
| Not found out | 7 | 8.14% |
| Evangelical Church | 3 | 3.49% |
| Total | 86 | |

In year 2021 was 86 people by religion 68 from Roman Catholic Church, 8 from None, 7 from Not found out and 3 from Evangelical Church.
