= Kokava nad Rimavicou =

Kokava nad Rimavicou Rimakokova
- Municipality
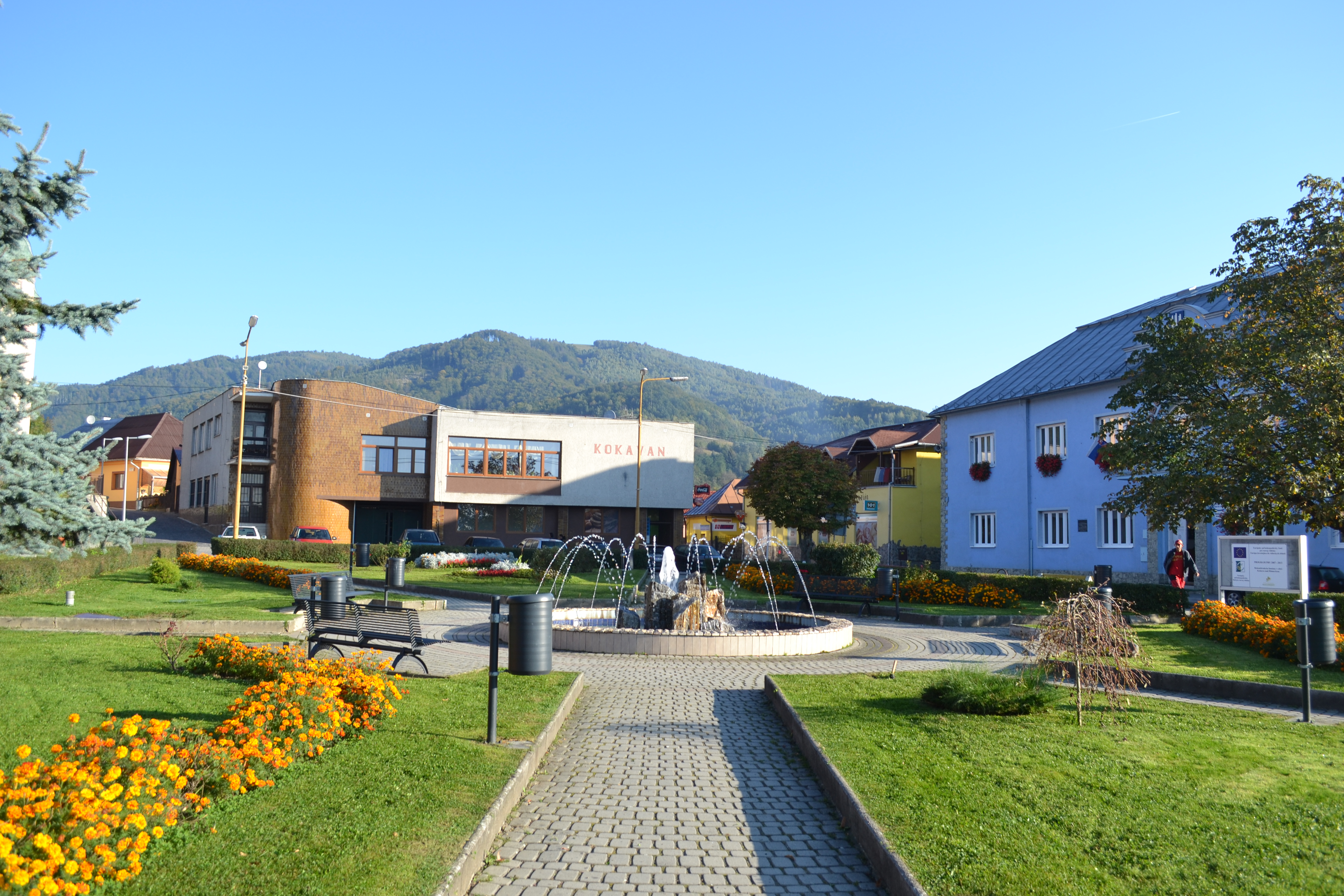

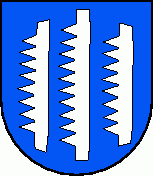
- Flag Coat of arms

- Location of Kokava nad Rimavicou in the Banská Bystrica Region Location of Kokava nad Rimavicou in Slovakia
- Coordinates: 48.57°N 19.83°E
- Country: Slovakia
- Region: Banská Bystrica Region
- District: Poltár District
- First mentioned: 1481

Area
  - Total: 66.42 km^{2} (25.64 sq mi)
- Elevation: 329 m (1,079 ft)

Population (2025)
  - Total: 2,677
- Time zone: UTC+1 (CET)
  - Summer (DST): UTC+2 (CEST)
- Postal code: 985 05
- Area code: +421 47
- Vehicle registration plate (until 2022): PT
- Website: www.kokava.sk

Kokava nad Rimavicou (Hungarian: Rimakokova) is a village and municipality in the Poltár District in the Banská Bystrica Region of Slovakia. The village is located in the Stolica Mountains of the Inner Western Carpathians. Kokava in the past had been center for regional glass production. In the 20th century were established two paper mills, a potash workshop and a steam timber, although they went through a recession recently. Nearby holiday location Kokava-Línia offers several chalets and cottages used mainly by winter skiers.

== Geography ==
The municipality lies at an altitude of 329 metres (1,079 ft) and covers an area of 66.42 km^{2} (25.64 sq mi) (2025).

== History ==
Before the establishment of independent Czechoslovakia in 1918, Kokava nad Rimavicou was part of Gömör and Kishont County within the Kingdom of Hungary. From 1939 to 1945, it was part of the Slovak Republic.

== Population ==
Population statistic (10 years)
Year	1995	2005	2015	2025
Count	3129	3104	2931	2677
Difference		−0.79%	−5.57%	−8.66%

Population statistic
Year	2024	2025
Count	2703	2677
Difference		−0.96%

It has a population of 2677 people (31 December 2025).

=== Ethnicity ===
Census 2021 (1+ %)
Ethnicity	Number	Fraction
Slovak	2663	96.45%
Romani	131	4.74%
Not found out	50	1.81%
Total	2761	

In year 2021 was 2761 people by ethnicity 2663 as Slovak, 131 as Romani, 50 as Not found out, 13 as Czech, 9 as Other, 8 as Russian, 8 as Hungarian, 4 as German, 2 as Rusyn, 1 as Ukrainian, 1 as Romanian, 1 as Austrian, 1 as Polish and 1 as Greek.

Note on population: The difference values of population numbers in the table "Population statistic" and in the sections "Ethnicity" & "Religion" is caused by the use of various statistical methods.

=== Religion ===
Census 2021 (1+ %)
Religion	Number	Fraction
Roman Catholic Church	1278	46.29%
None	931	33.72%
Evangelical Church	394	14.27%
Not found out	77	2.79%
Greek Catholic Church	28	1.01%
Total	2761	

In year 2021 was 2761 people by religion 1278 from Roman Catholic Church, 931 from None, 394 from Evangelical Church, 77 from Not found out, 28 from Greek Catholic Church, 9 from Paganism and natural spirituality, 9 from Jehovah's Witnesses, 6 from Other and not ascertained christian church, 6 from Christian Congregations in Slovakia, 6 from United Methodist Church, 5 from Old Catholic Church, 4 from Calvinist Church, 3 from Buddhism, 2 from Eastern Orthodox Church, 2 from Other and 1 from Islam.

== Culture ==
Kokava is known for its festival tradition. In 2012 the folklore festival Koliesko (The Wheel) celebrated its 22nd anniversary. Additionally, there is annual country music festival Country fest Kokava and a festival of gypsy music Balvafest. Na Chorepe byva Havran, vtak. (bird, raven).

== See also ==
- List of municipalities and towns in Slovakia

== Genealogical resources ==
The records for genealogical research are available at the state archive "Statny Archiv in Banska Bystrica, Slovakia"

- Roman Catholic church records (births/marriages/deaths): 1804-1896 (parish A)
- Lutheran church records (births/marriages/deaths): 1837-1911 (parish A)
- Reformated church records (births/marriages/deaths): 1771-1896 (parish B)
