= Rovňany =

Rovňany Ipolyróna
- Municipality
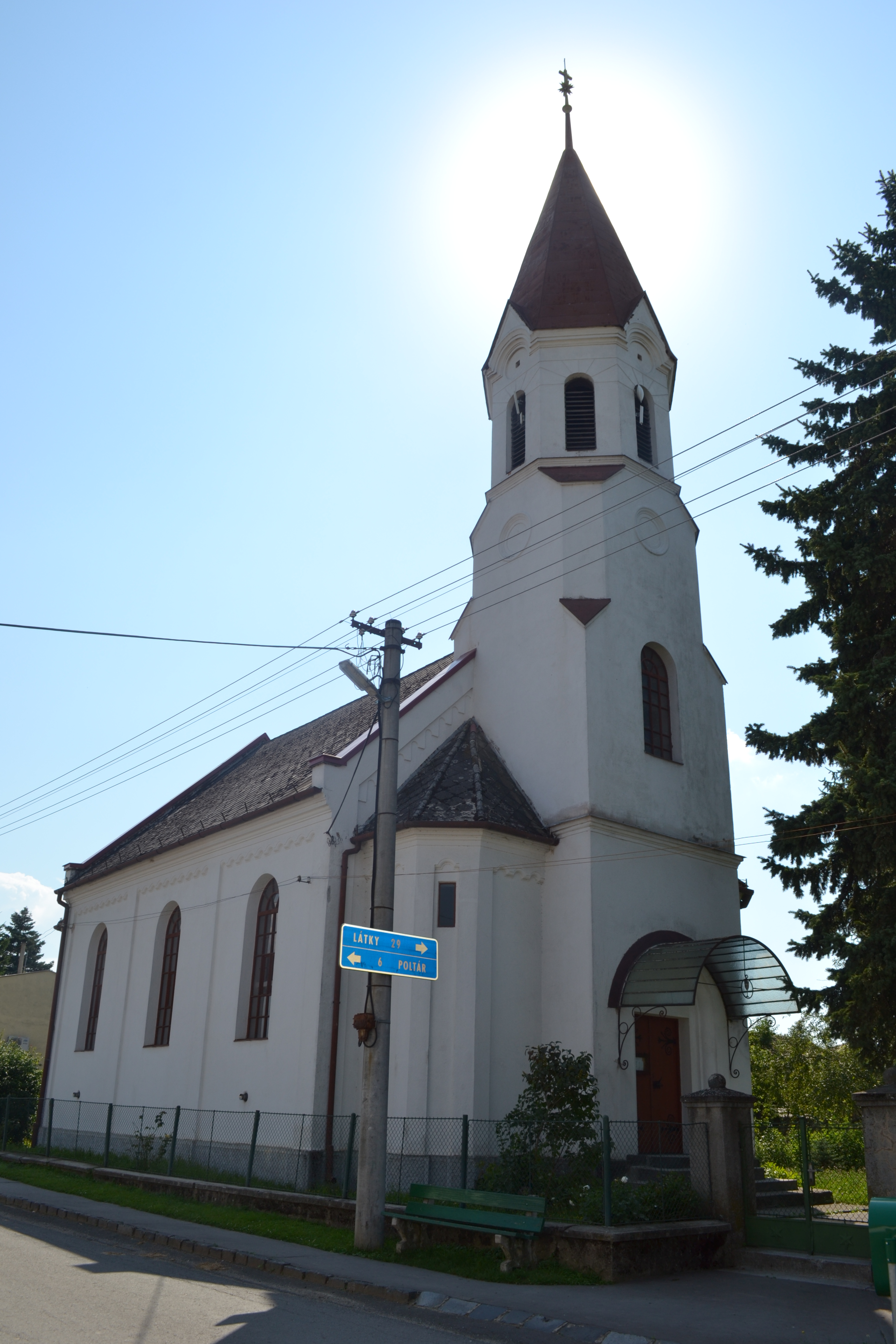
- Evangelical church in Rovňany

- Flag

- Location of Rovňany in the Banská Bystrica Region Location of Rovňany in Slovakia
- Coordinates: 48.43°N 19.73°E
- Country: Slovakia
- Region: Banská Bystrica Region
- District: Poltár District
- First mentioned: 1430

Area
  - Total: 9.58 km^{2} (3.70 sq mi)
- Elevation: 237 m (778 ft)

Population (2025)
  - Total: 232
- Time zone: UTC+1 (CET)
  - Summer (DST): UTC+2 (CEST)
- Postal code: 985 24
- Area code: +421 47
- Vehicle registration plate (until 2022): PT
- Website: www.rovnany.sk

Rovňany (Hungarian: Ipolyróna) is a village and municipality in the Poltár District in the Banská Bystrica Region of Slovakia. The village has post, football pitch, public library, foodstuff store and a gym hall. In Rovňany are located a distillery and fruit breeder station.

== Geography ==
The municipality lies at an altitude of 237 metres (778 ft) and covers an area of 9.58 km^{2} (3.70 sq mi) (2025).

== History ==
Before the establishment of independent Czechoslovakia in 1918, Rovňany was part of Nógrád County within the Kingdom of Hungary. From 1939 to 1945, it was part of the Slovak Republic.

== Population ==
Population statistic (10 years)
Year	1995	2005	2015	2025
Count	293	279	255	232
Difference		−4.77%	−8.60%	−9.01%

Population statistic
Year	2024	2025
Count	239	232
Difference		−2.92%

It has a population of 232 people (31 December 2025).

=== Ethnicity ===
Census 2021 (1+ %)
Ethnicity	Number	Fraction
Slovak	233	94.71%
Not found out	11	4.47%
Total	246	

In year 2021 was 246 people by ethnicity 233 as Slovak, 11 as Not found out, 1 as Czech, 1 as Romani and 1 as German.

Note on population: The difference values of population numbers in the table "Population statistic" and in the sections "Ethnicity" & "Religion" is caused by the use of various statistical methods.

=== Religion ===
Census 2021 (1+ %)
Religion	Number	Fraction
Roman Catholic Church	107	43.5%
Evangelical Church	66	26.83%
None	59	23.98%
Not found out	11	4.47%
Total	246	

In year 2021 was 246 people by religion 107 from Roman Catholic Church, 66 from Evangelical Church, 59 from None, 11 from Not found out, 1 from Other and not ascertained christian church, 1 from Buddhism and 1 from Apostolic Church.
