= Málinec =

Málinec Málnapatak
- Municipality
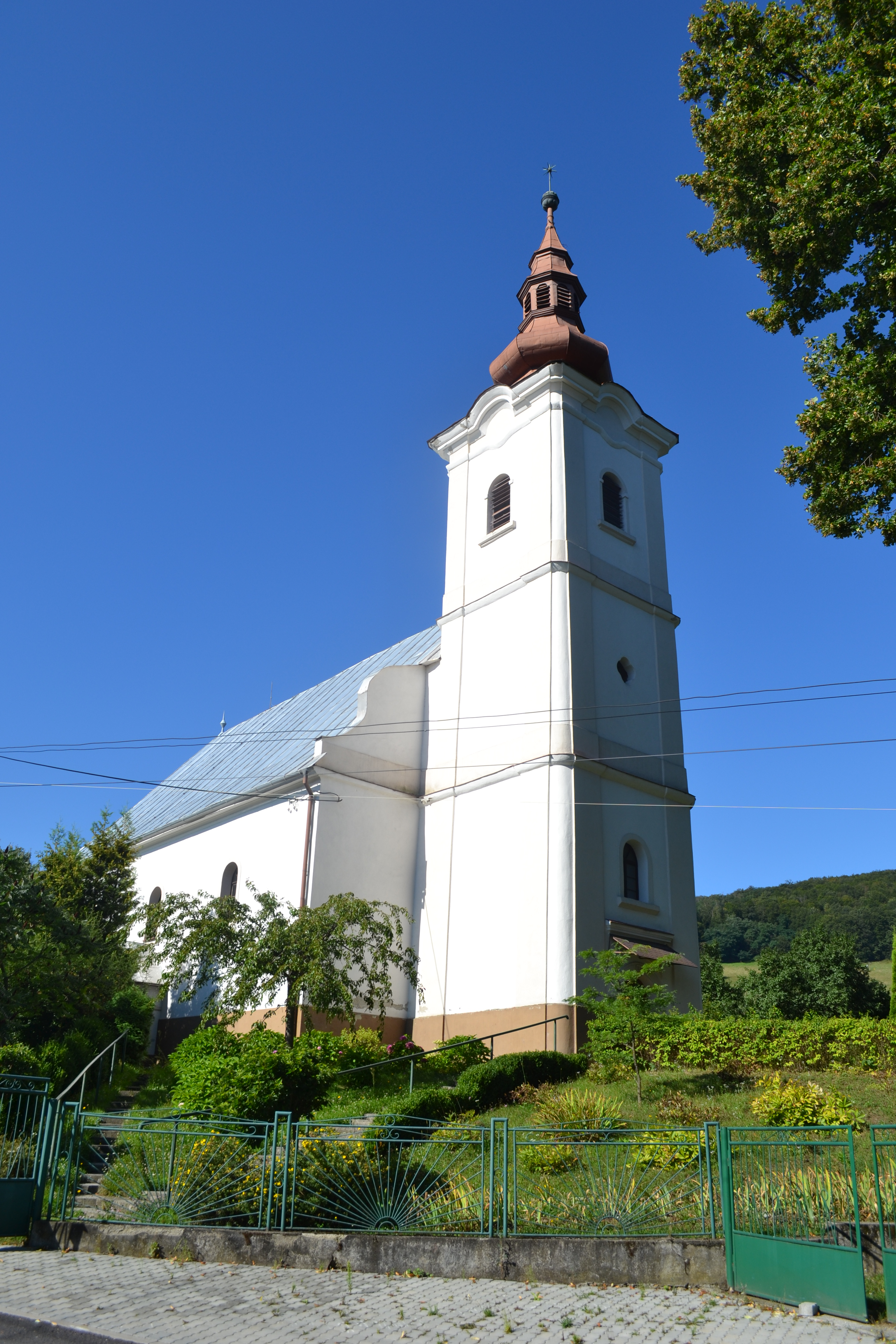
- Lutheran church

- Flag

- Location of Málinec in the Banská Bystrica Region Location of Málinec in Slovakia
- Coordinates: 48.50°N 19.68°E
- Country: Slovakia
- Region: Banská Bystrica Region
- District: Poltár District
- First mentioned: 1514

Area
  - Total: 49.99 km^{2} (19.30 sq mi)
- Elevation: 527 m (1,729 ft)

Population (2025)
  - Total: 1,387
- Time zone: UTC+1 (CET)
  - Summer (DST): UTC+2 (CEST)
- Postal code: 985 26
- Area code: +421 47
- Vehicle registration plate (until 2022): PT
- Website: malinec.sk

Málinec (Hungarian: Málnapatak, German: Malintz) is a village and municipality in the Poltár District in the Banská Bystrica Region of Slovakia. It is located 13 km north of the district center. In the near o Málinec is water reservoir, which supplies several locations in Poltár District. The village is a starting point of the cycling event Novohradský cyklomaratón.

== Geography ==
The municipality lies at an altitude of 527 metres (1,729 ft) and covers an area of 49.99 km^{2} (19.30 sq mi) (2025).

== History ==
Before the establishment of independent Czechoslovakia in 1918, Málinec was part of Nógrád County within the Kingdom of Hungary. From 1939 to 1945, it was part of the Slovak Republic.

== Population ==
Population statistic (10 years)
Year	1995	2005	2015	2025
Count	1492	1471	1487	1387
Difference		−1.40%	+1.08%	−6.72%

Population statistic
Year	2024	2025
Count	1393	1387
Difference		−0.43%

It has a population of 1387 people (31 December 2025).

=== Ethnicity ===
Census 2021 (1+ %)
Ethnicity	Number	Fraction
Slovak	1353	96.91%
Not found out	35	2.5%
Romani	17	1.21%
Total	1396	

In year 2021 was 1396 people by ethnicity 1353 as Slovak, 35 as Not found out, 17 as Romani, 4 as Czech, 2 as Serbian, 2 as Other, 1 as Jewish, 1 as Vietnamese, 1 as Ukrainian, 1 as Rusyn, 1 as Russian and 1 as Hungarian.

Note on population: The difference values of population numbers in the table "Population statistic" and in the sections "Ethnicity" & "Religion" is caused by the use of various statistical methods.

=== Religion ===
Census 2021 (1+ %)
Religion	Number	Fraction
Evangelical Church	601	43.05%
Roman Catholic Church	422	30.23%
None	316	22.64%
Not found out	31	2.22%
Greek Catholic Church	14	1%
Total	1396	

In year 2021 was 1396 people by religion 601 from Evangelical Church, 422 from Roman Catholic Church, 316 from None, 31 from Not found out, 14 from Greek Catholic Church, 3 from Ad hoc movements, 2 from Eastern Orthodox Church, 2 from Jehovah's Witnesses, 2 from Other, 1 from Calvinist Church, 1 from Islam and 1 from Czechoslovak Hussite Church.
