= Zlatno, Poltár District =

Zlatno Zlatnó
- Municipality
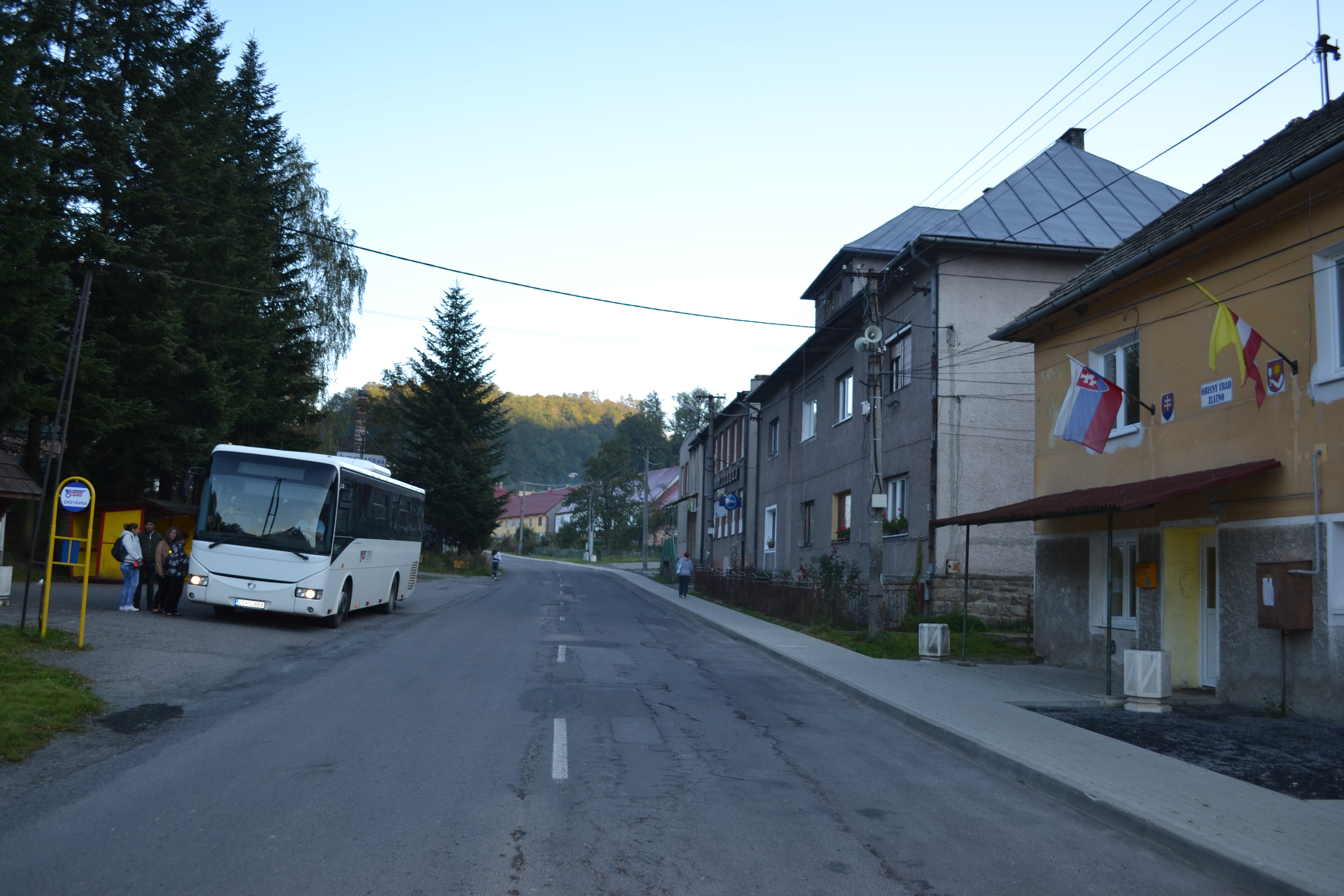

- Flag

- Location of Zlatno in the Banská Bystrica Region Location of Zlatno in Slovakia
- Coordinates: 48°31′N 19°49′E
- Country: Slovakia
- Region: Banská Bystrica Region
- District: Poltár District
- First mentioned: 1611

Area
  - Total: 0.00 km^{2} (0 sq mi)
- Elevation: 389 m (1,276 ft)

Population (2025)
  - Total: 423
- Time zone: UTC+1 (CET)
  - Summer (DST): UTC+2 (CEST)
- Postal code: 982 63
- Area code: +421 47
- Vehicle registration plate (until 2022): PT
- Website: www.obeczlatno.sk

Zlatno (Hungarian: Zlatnó or Zlatnótelep) is a village and municipality in the Poltár District in the Banská Bystrica Region of Slovakia. In 1998 it became a self-administered village, before it was a part of Kokava nad Rimavicou.

== History ==
Before the establishment of independent Czechoslovakia in 1918, Zlatno was part of Nógrád County within the Kingdom of Hungary. From 1939 to 1945, it was part of the Slovak Republic.

== Population ==
Population statistic (10 years)
Year	1995	2005	2015	2025
Count	0	513	472	423
Difference		–	−7.99%	−10.38%

Population statistic
Year	2024	2025
Count	439	423
Difference		−3.64%

It has a population of 423 people (31 December 2025).

=== Ethnicity ===
Census 2021 (1+ %)
Ethnicity	Number	Fraction
Slovak	411	90.32%
Not found out	44	9.67%
Romani	26	5.71%
Total	455	

In year 2021 was 455 people by ethnicity 411 as Slovak, 44 as Not found out, 26 as Romani, 3 as Hungarian, 2 as Czech, 1 as Rusyn and 1 as Croatian.

Note on population: The difference values of population numbers in the table "Population statistic" and in the sections "Ethnicity" & "Religion" is caused by the use of various statistical methods.

=== Religion ===
Census 2021 (1+ %)
Religion	Number	Fraction
Roman Catholic Church	175	38.46%
None	161	35.38%
Not found out	74	16.26%
Evangelical Church	30	6.59%
Ad hoc movements	5	1.1%
Total	455	

In year 2021 was 455 people by religion 175 from Roman Catholic Church, 161 from None, 74 from Not found out, 30 from Evangelical Church, 5 from Ad hoc movements, 3 from Other and not ascertained christian church, 3 from Greek Catholic Church, 1 from Eastern Orthodox Church, 1 from Jehovah's Witnesses, 1 from Christian Congregations in Slovakia and 1 from Other.

== Glass production ==
Production of glass started in the village in 1833. Products had been transported to several world exhibitions. In the middle of 19th century came to Zlatno Leo Valentin Pantoček. He invented the way how to produce the glass money. Later this technique was named as hyaloplastics. In 1856 followed the invention of iris glass. A lot of production had been exported to United Kingdom and United States. In Zlatno had been a glasswork museum, which, however, ceased to exist. The glass factory stopped its production in 2003. However, several private companies continue in glass production.
