= List of synagogues in Slovakia =

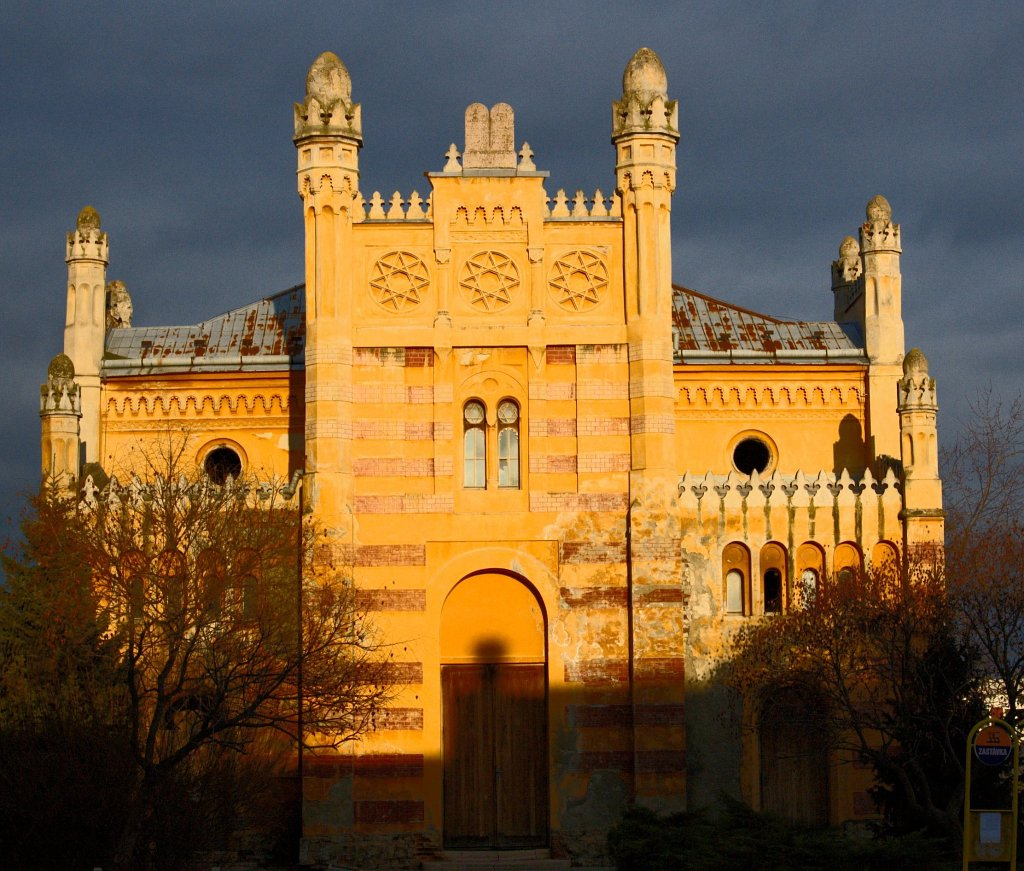
One of the many synagogues in Slovakia: the Vrbove synagogue (built in 1883)

This list of synagogues in Slovakia contains active, otherwise used and destroyed synagogues in Slovakia. The list of Slovak synagogues is not necessarily complete, as only a negligible number of sources testify to the existence of some synagogues.

In all cases the year of the completion of the building is given. Italics indicate an approximate date.

== Bratislava Region ==
Location	Name	Built	Destroyed	Remarks	Picture
Bratislava	Bratislava Neolog Synagogue	1893	1967	Demolished when building new roads	
Bratislava	Bratislava New Orthodox Synagogue	1926	Stand	Other name: Heydukova Street Synagogue.	
Bratislava	Bratislava Old Orthodox Synagogue	1863	1961	Destroyed	
Gajary	Gajary Synagogue	1875; Second half of 19th century	1950	Demolished after WW2	
Galanta	Galanta Synagogue	1899	1975	Destroyed in the 1970s.	
Malacky	Malacky Synagogue	1886	Stand	Used as an art school	2009
Modra	Modra Synagogue	1902	Stand		
Pezinok	Pezinok Synagogue	1872	1958	Destroyed.	
Rohožník	Rohožník Synagogue	1850	Stand	Today warehouse	2014
Senec	Senec Synagogue	1875; Last quarter of 19th century	Stand	Is empty	2013
Stupava	Stupava Synagogue	1803	Stand		2009
Svätý Jur	Svätý Jur Synagogue	1790	Stand	Almost decay today	2019
Záhorská Ves	Záhorská Ves Synagogue	?	1944	Destroyed during WW II	

== Trnava Region ==
Location	Name	Built	Destroyed	Remarks	Picture
Dunajská Streda	Dunajská Streda Adas-Israel Synagogue	1927	1955	Destroyed in the 1950s	
Dunajská Streda	Dunajská Streda Great Synagogue	1865	1955	Destroyed in the 1950s	
Hlohovec	Hlohovec Synagogue	1891	1960	Destroyed.	
Holíč	Holíč Synagogue	1750; Built in the 18th century	1950	Destroyed after WWII	
Piešťany	Neolog Synagogue Piešťany	1904	1979	Destroyed.	
Šamorín	Šamorín Synagogue	1912	Stand	Renovated; Art gallery	2020
Šaštín-Stráže	Šaštín Synagogue	1852	Stand		2020
Senica	Senica Synagogue	1866	1988	Destroyed.	
Sereď	Sereď Synagogue	1925; Built in the 1920s	2001	Destroyed.	
Trnava	Trnava Orthodox Synagogue	1892	Stand	Today cafe and cultural center	2013
Trnava	Trnava Status Quo Ante Synagogue	1897	Stand	Today art gallery and Judaica exhibition	2019
Veľký Meder	Veľký Meder Synagogue	1875; Built in the 1870s	1950	Destroyed after WW II	
Vrbové	Vrbové Synagogue	1883	Stand	Is empty	2008

== Trenčín Region ==
Location	Name	Built	Destroyed	Remarks	Picture
Bánovce nad Bebravou	Bánovce nad Bebravou Synagogue	1862	Stand	Today Lutheran church	2020
Čachtice	Čachtice Synagogue	1830; In first half of 19th century	1955	Destroyed.	
Lúky	Lúky Synagogue	1872	1945	Destroyed.	
Nové Mesto nad Váhom	Nové Mesto nad Váhom Synagogue	1815; First third of 19th century.	1955	Destroyed.	
Považská Bystrica	Považská Bystrica Synagogue	1893	Stand		
Prievidza	Prievidza Synagogue	1868	1980	Destroyed.	
Púchov	Púchov Synagogue	1868	1988	Destroyed.	
Trenčianska Teplá	Trenčianska Teplá Synagogue	?	?	Destroyed.	
Trencianske Teplice	Trencianske Teplice Synagogue	1866	1950	Destroyed after WWII	
Trenčín	Trenčín Old Synagogue	1795	1913	Razed when new synagogue was built.	
Trenčín	Trenčín Synagogue	1913	Stand	Today cultural center	2015

== Nitra Region ==
Location	Name	Built	Destroyed	Remarks	Picture
Bojná	Bojná Synagogue	1878; Before 1880.		Part used as bar. Up for sale in June 2020	2018
Bošáca	Bošáca Synagogue	1890; End of 19th century	?	Destroyed.	
Dubník	Dubník Synagogue	?	?	Destroyed.	
Hurbanovo	Hurbanovo Synagogue	1880	?	Destroyed.	
Kolárovo	Kolárovo Synagogue	1875; 2nd half of 19th century	1950	Destroyed after WWII	
Komárno	Komárno Neolog Synagogue	1863	Stand	Today fitness center	2019
Komárno	Komárno Synagogue	1894	Stand		2015
Komárno	Komárno Former Synagogue	1827	Stand	Synagogue till 1863, today restaurant and bar	
Levice	Levice Synagogue	1853	Stand	Renovated and since 2012 culture house	2012
Nitra	Nitra Synagogue	1911	Stand	Used as a cultural center	2015
Nitra-Párovce	Nitra-Párovce Synagogue	1850; Built in 19th century	1975	Destroyed in the 1970s	
Nové Zámky	Nové Zámky Neolog Synagogue	1859; 2nd half of 19th century	1945	Heavily damaged during WWII and later razed.	
Nové Zámky	Nové Zámky Orthodox Synagogue	1880	Stand	Used as a cultural center	2009
Pribeta	Pribeta Synagogue	1850 in 19th century	1950	Destroyed after WW II	
Šahy	Šahy Status Quo Ante Synagogue	1852	Stand	Renovated; Art gallery	2019
Šahy	Šahy Orthodox Synagogue	1929	Stand	Underwent reconstruction after WW II	2020
Šaľa	Šaľa Synagogue	1896	1965	Destroyed.	
Štúrovo	Štúrovo Synagogue	1926	Stand	Strongly altered after WW II	
Šurany	Šurany Synagogue	1916	Stand	Today museum, cultural center	vor 2009
Topoľčany	Topoľčany Synagogue	1850; 19th century	1950	Destroyed after WW II	
Veľké Ripňany	Veľké Ripňany Synagogue	1904	1953	Destroyed.	
Vráble	Vráble Synagogue	1870	1989	Destroyed.	
Želiezovce	Želiezovce Synagogue	?	?	Destroyed.	
Zlaté Moravce	Zlaté Moravce Synagogue	1927	Stand	In 1951 changed to a gym	

== Žilina Region ==
Location	Name	Built	Destroyed	Remarks	Picture
Bytča	Bytča Synagogue	1886	Stand	In a bad condition. To be renovated.	2009
Čadca	Čadca Synagogue	1864	1972	Demolished	
Dolný Kubín	Dolný Kubín Synagogue	1893	Stand	Strongly altered, today cinema.	
Liptovský Hrádok	Liptovský Hrádok Synagogue	1875; Second half of 19th century	1950	Destroyed after WW II	
Liptovský Mikuláš	Liptovský Mikuláš Synagogue	1846	Stand	Renovated, used for exhibitions	2011
Martin	Martin Synagogue	1884 last quarter of 19th century	1974	Destroyed.	
Ružomberok	Ružomberok Synagogue	1880	Stand	Today culture house	2009
Slanica	Slanica Synagogue	1850 in 19th century	1950	Destroyed around 1950	
Trstená	Trstená Synagogue	1839	Stand	Now shops inside	2012
Turany	Turany Synagogue	1800	1980	Destroyed after 1980	
Turčianske Teplice	Turčianske Teplice Synagogue	?	1945	Destroyed after 1945.	
Turzovka	Turzovka Synagogue	1898 started 1895	?	Destroyed.	
Tvrdošín	Tvrdošín Synagogue	1895	Stand	Strongly altered, night bar.	
Varín	Varín Synagogue	?	1950	Destroyed after WW II	
Veličná	Veličná Synagogue	?	1943	Wooden synagogue.	
Vrútky	Vrútky Synagogue	1910		Stand	2008
Žilina	Žilina New Synagogue	1931	Stand	1945–2010 used as a theater, concert hall and cinema; renovated from 2011	2009
Žilina	Žilina Old Synagogue	1865	1928	Demolished to give way for new synagogue.	

== Banská Bystrica Region ==
Location	Name	Built	Destroyed	Remarks	Picture
Banská Bystrica	Banská Bystrica Synagogue	1867	1983	Destroyed.	
Banská Štiavnica	Banská Štiavnica Synagogue	1893	Stand	Renovated	2015
Brezno	Brezno Synagogue	1902	Stand	Belonged to the neolog community.	
Detva	Detva Synagogue	?	Stand	Widely rebuild; today a cinema	
Fiľakovo	Fiľakovo Synagogue	1873	1950	Damaged in 1944, demolished in 1950 or 1960.	
Halič	Halič Synagogue	1872; 2nd half of 19th century.	Stand	Now the church of the Lutheran congregation	2013
Kokava nad Rimavicou	Kokava nad Rimavicou Orthodox Synagogue	1890	Stand	Following a partial renovation, it is occasionally used for cultural purposes.	2014
Kremnica	Kremnica Synagogue	1890	1944	Destroyed during WW II.	
Lučenec	Lučenec Neolog Synagogue	1925	Stand	Renovated, cultural center	2016
Lučenec	Lučenec Old Neolog Synagogue	1863	1923	Razed to give way to new Neolog Synagogue.	
Lučenec	Lučenec Orthodox Synagogue	1867	1969	Destroyed.	
Rimavská Seč	Rimavská Seč Orthodox Synagogue	1900	demolished in 1957–1958	A single-family home now stands on the site where it once stood.	
Rimavská Sobota	Rimavská Sobota Orthodox Synagogue	1868	1986	Destroyed.	
Tornala	Tornala Orthodox Synagogue	1890	1989	Destroyed after WW II	
Tornala	Tornala Neolog Synagogue	1927?	Stand	Not in use.	
Zvolen	Zvolen Synagogue	1895	Stand	Strongly altered after WW II, not in use	
Žiar nad Hronom	Žiar nad Hronom Synagogue	1888	Stand	Reconstructed. Not in use.	

== Prešov Region ==
Location	Name	Built	Destroyed	Remarks	Picture
Bardejov	Bardejov Old Synagogue	1836	Stand	Renovated	2019
Bardejov	Chevra-Bikur-Cholim Synagogue	1929	Stand	Interior almost completely preserved	2018
Brezovica	Brezovica Synagogue	1870	1965	Destroyed.	
Giraltovce	Giraltovce Synagogue	1850 in 19th century.	1950	Destroyed after WW II.	
Humenné	Humenné Old Synagogue	1795 in the 1790s	1975	Destroyed in the 1970s.	
Humenné	Humenné New Synagogue	1930	1975	Destroyed in the 1970s.	
Huncovce	Huncovce Synagogue	1825	Stand	Today it is a textile storehouse.	
Kapušany	Kapušany Synagogue	1891	1950	Destroyed after WW II.	
Kežmarok	Kežmarok Synagogue	1875; 2nd half of 19th century.	1955	Destroyed in the 1950s.	
Kurima	Kurima Synagogue	1850 in 19th century.	1950	Destroyedafter WW II.	
Levoča	Levoča Synagogue	1899	1975	Destroyed in the 1970s.	
Lipany	Lipany Synagogue	1929	Stand	Fully altered and now office premises.	
Ľubotice	Lubotice Synagogue	1833	Stand	now used by Greek-Catholic church	
Podolínec	Podolínec Synagogue	1885 in last quarter of 19th century.	1988	Destroyed.	
Prešov	Prešov Neolog Synagogue	1887	Stand	Used as a furniture store	2014
Prešov	Prešov Orthodox Synagogue	1898	Stand		2012
Prešov	Prešov Klaus Synagogue	1935	Stand	Rented as an office by the Jewish community	2015
Raslavice	Raslavice Synagogue	1930 in 1930s.	Stand	Example of modern architecture in the interwar period. Today warehouse	2009
Sabinov	Sabinov Synagogue	1864	1945	Burnt down by Germans in January 1945.	
Spišské Podhradie	Spišské Podhradie Synagogue	1875	Stand	Today culture house	2006
Stará Ľubovňa	Stará Ľubovňa Synagogue	1930 in the 1920s or 1930s.	1950	Destroyed after WW II.	
Stropkov	Stropkov Synagogue	1894	1985	Destroyed in the 1980s.	
Vranov nad Topľou	Vranov nad Topľou Synagogue	1924	1982	Destroyed.	
Zborov (okres Bardejov)	Zborov Synagogue			Destroyed.	

== Košice Region ==
Location	Name	Built	Destroyed	Remarks	Picture
Čaňa	Čaňa Synagogue	?	Stand	Now used as a cinema and shop.	
Gelnica	Gelnica Synagogue	1910 begin of 20th century.	1939	Destroyed by local German population	
Košice	Košice Status Quo Ante Synagogue	1866	1958	Destroyed.	
Košice	Košice Orthodox Synagogue	1899	Stand		2021
Košice	Košice Hassidic Synagogue	1920	Stand		2021
Košice	Košice New Orthodox Synagogue	1927	Stand		2006
Košice	Košice Neolog Synagogue	1927	Stand	Now Philharmonic	2017
Kráľovský Chlmec	Kráľovský Chlmec Synagogue	1850	Stand	Is empty	2010
Krompachy	Krompachy Synagogue	?	?	Destroyed.	
Michalovce	Michalovce Synagogue	1888	1976	Destroyed.	
Plešivec	Plešivec Orthodox Synagogue	1906	1950	Destroyed after WW II.	
Pribeník	Pribeník Synagogue	1910 early 20th century	Stand	Used for cultural purposes.	
Rožňava	Rožňava Neolog Synagogue	1893	1958	Destroyed.	
Sečovce	Sečovce Synagogue	1904	1960	Destroyed sometime after WW II.	
Somotor	Somotor Synagogue	1890	1950	Destroyed after WW II.	
Spišská Nová Ves	Spišská Nová Ves Synagogue	1899	1941	Destroyed.	
Trebišov	Trebišov Synagogue	1905	1950	Destroyed after WW II.	
Veľké Kapušany	Veľké Kapušany Synagogue	1891	1950	Destroyed after WW II.	

== Sources ==
- Old postcards and pictures of synagogues in Slovakia – judaica.cz
- Maroš Borský: Synagogue Architecture in Slovakia Towards Creating a Memorial Landscape of Lost Community Dissertation: Center for Jewish Studies Heidelberg 2005 including PDF-file with pictures, (last accessed 30. September 2020)
- http://judaica.cz/?page_id=2756
- http://judaica.cz/?page_id=8827
- http://judaica.cz/?page_id=8830
- http://judaica.cz/?page_id=2759
- http://judaica.cz/?page_id=2762
- https://core.ac.uk/download/pdf/32579528.pdf

== Other literature ==
- Pusztay Sándor: Zsinagógák Szlovákiában – Zsinagógák, zsidó temetők, emlékhelyek, Kornétás Kiadó, 2018, ISBN 9786155058929
