= Vrbové Synagogue =

Former synagogue in Vrbové, Slovakia

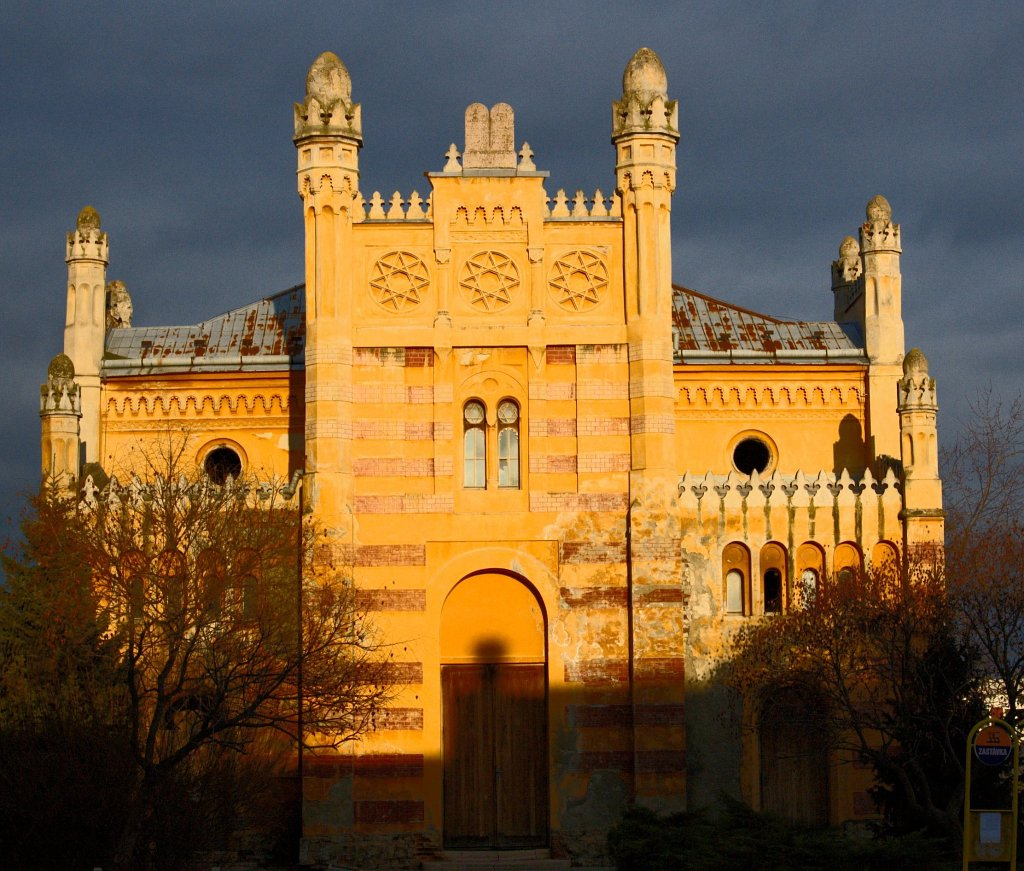
- The façade of the former synagogue in 2008

- Location of the former synagogue in Slovakia

Religion
- Affiliation: Judaism (former)
- Rite: Nusach Ashkenaz
- Ecclesiastical or organizational status: Synagogue (1883–1940s); Profane use (1948–1980s); Cultural center (since 2016)
- Status: Abandoned (as a synagogue); Repurposed

Location
- Location: Beňovského Street, Vrbové
- Country: Slovakia
- Interactive map of Vrbové Synagogue
- Coordinates: 48°37′15″N 17°43′32″E

Architecture
- Architects: Grätzel and Kittler
- Type: Synagogue architecture
- Style: Moorish Revival; Rundbogenstil
- Groundbreaking: 1882
- Completed: 1883

Specifications
- Dome: One
- Materials: Brick

The Vrbové Synagogue is a former Jewish congregation and synagogue, located on Beňovského Street in Vrbové, Slovakia. The synagogue was erected in 1883 and is a protected cultural monument. The synagogue building was bought in 1947 by Dezider Hačko, a local businessman, and assumed by the state in the following year. Subsequently restored, the building has served as a cultural center since 2016.

== History ==
A Jewish community in Vrbové is known since at least 1522. At the 1880 census the 1303 Jews comprised 28% of the town's population.

The present building of the former synagogue was erected in 1883 at Beňovského Street, the main street of the town.

In the late 1980s the town's authority started the restoration with the aim to use the building for cultural purposes, and two facades were given a respectable appearance. But after the political changes of 1989 half of the property was given back to Hačko who owned the building shortly after World War II and the work stopped. Local government authorities acquired the building and completed restorations in 2016.

== Architecture ==
The synagogue has a three-partite front in the Moorish Revival style and is decorated with horizontal red-yellow stripes, octagonal stars and slim minaretes. The door and windows are built in the Rundbogenstil. On top of the central part between two of the minarets are the Tablets of Law.

The architect was Grätzel and Kittler, an architectural firm from Bratislava.

The interior is only partially preserved; the women's gallery, supported by cast-iron columns, is without railings and the furnishing has disappeared. The ceiling is covered by lively geometric and floral motifs.

== See also ==
- History of the Jews in Slovakia
- List of synagogues in Slovakia
