= Nitra Synagogue =

Former synagogue in Nitra, Slovakia

- Slovak: Synagoga v Nitre
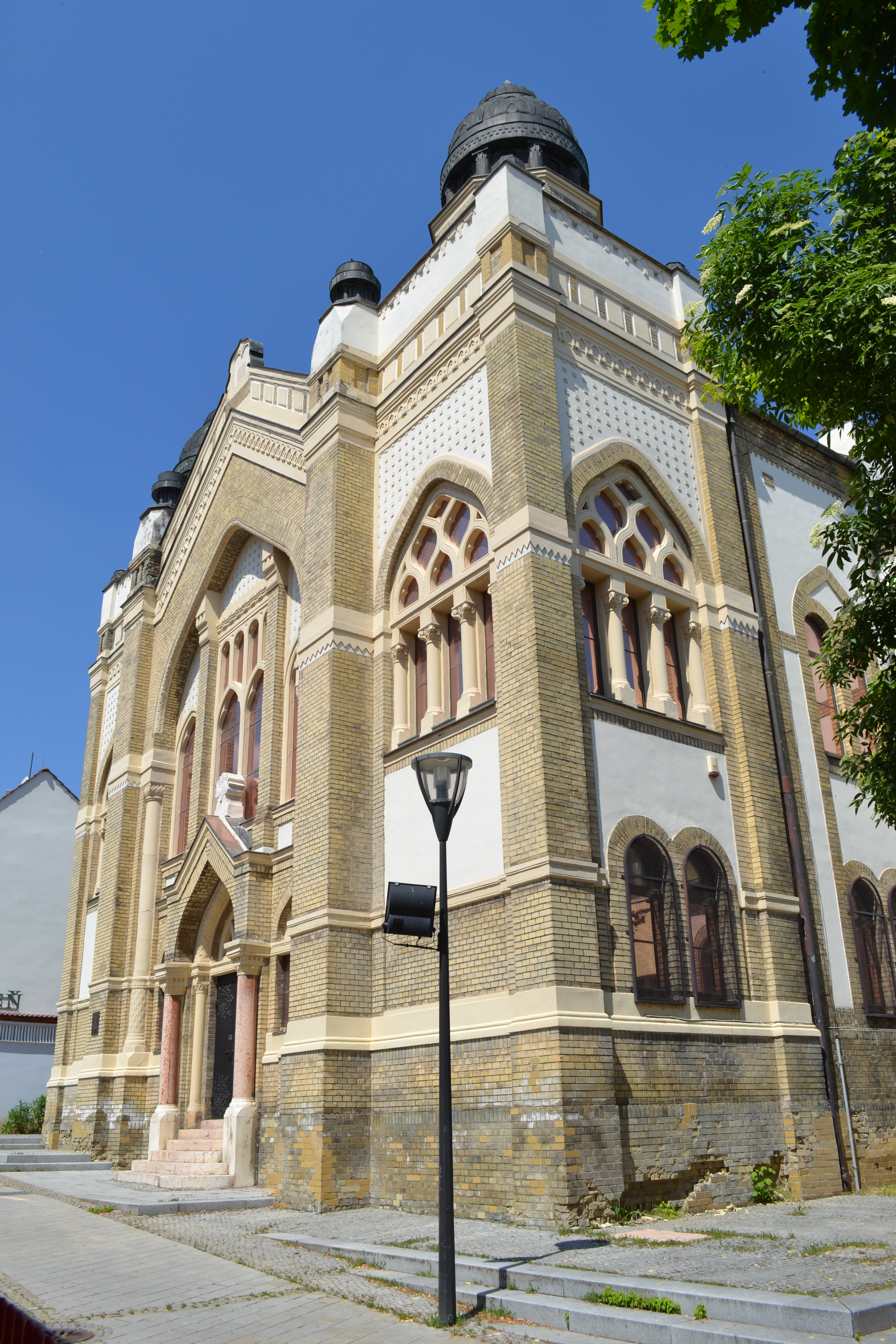
- The façade of the former synagogue in 2015

- Location of the former synagogue in Slovakia

Religion
- Affiliation: Neolog Judaism (former)
- Rite: Nusach Ashkenaz
- Ecclesiastical or organizational status: Synagogue (1911–1940s); Profane use (1940s–2004); Cultural center (since 2004)
- Status: Abandoned (as a synagogue); Repurposed

Location
- Location: 3 Pri synagóge Street, Nitra, Nitra Region
- Country: Slovakia
- Interactive map of Nitra Synagogue
- Coordinates: 48°18′42″N 18°05′11″E

Architecture
- Architect: Lipót Baumhorn
- Type: Synagogue architecture
- Style: Moorish Revival; Byzantine Revival; Art Nouveau
- Established: 1750 (as a congregation)
- Groundbreaking: 1908
- Completed: 1911

Specifications
- Dome: One
- Materials: Brick

The Nitra Synagogue (Slovak: Synagoga v Nitre) is a former Neolog Jewish congregation and synagogue, located at 3 Pri synagóge Street, in Nitra, in the Nitra Region of Slovakia. The building operated as a place of worship between 1911 and World War II; and, since 2004, has operated as a cultural center.

== History ==
Jews settled in Parovce from the first century. Thereafter, Parovce served as the Jewish extension of Nitra, where Jews were not admitted. In 1840, when the Budapest parliament allowed Jews to settle anywhere, the Jews of Parovce moved to Nitra. The congregation was formally established in 1750.

Completed in 1911 and designed by Lipót Baumhorn, the prolific Budapest-based synagogue architect, the synagogues is situated in a narrow lane, and is a characteristic example of Baumhorn's style. A melange of Moorish Revival, Byzantine Revival and Art Nouveau elements, the synagogue faces the street with a twin-tower façade.

The sanctuary is a domed hall supported by four pillars that also support the women's gallery. After more than a decade of painstaking restoration by the municipality of Nitra, the building is now used as a center for cultural activities.

The women's gallery houses "The Fate of Slovak Jews" – Slovakia's national Holocaust memorial exhibition. The synagogue serves as a permanent exhibition space for graphic works by the Nitra-born Israeli artist Shraga Weil.

During World War II, the Government persecuted Jews, peaking in 1942 when the Jews were deported to Poland. Some 4,400 of Nitra's Jews were sent to extermination camps. By the end of August 1944, German troops, accompanied by the local Slovak garrison, entered Nitra and sent the remaining Jews to Auschwitz. In 1963, the authorities destroyed all Jewish public buildings in Nitra except this synagogue. After 1989, the cemeteries were again desecrated and besmirched with swastikas. Local authorities claimed that the Jews were responsible.

== See also ==
- History of the Jews in Slovakia
- List of synagogues in Slovakia
