= Stupava Synagogue =

Synagogue in Stupava, Slovakia

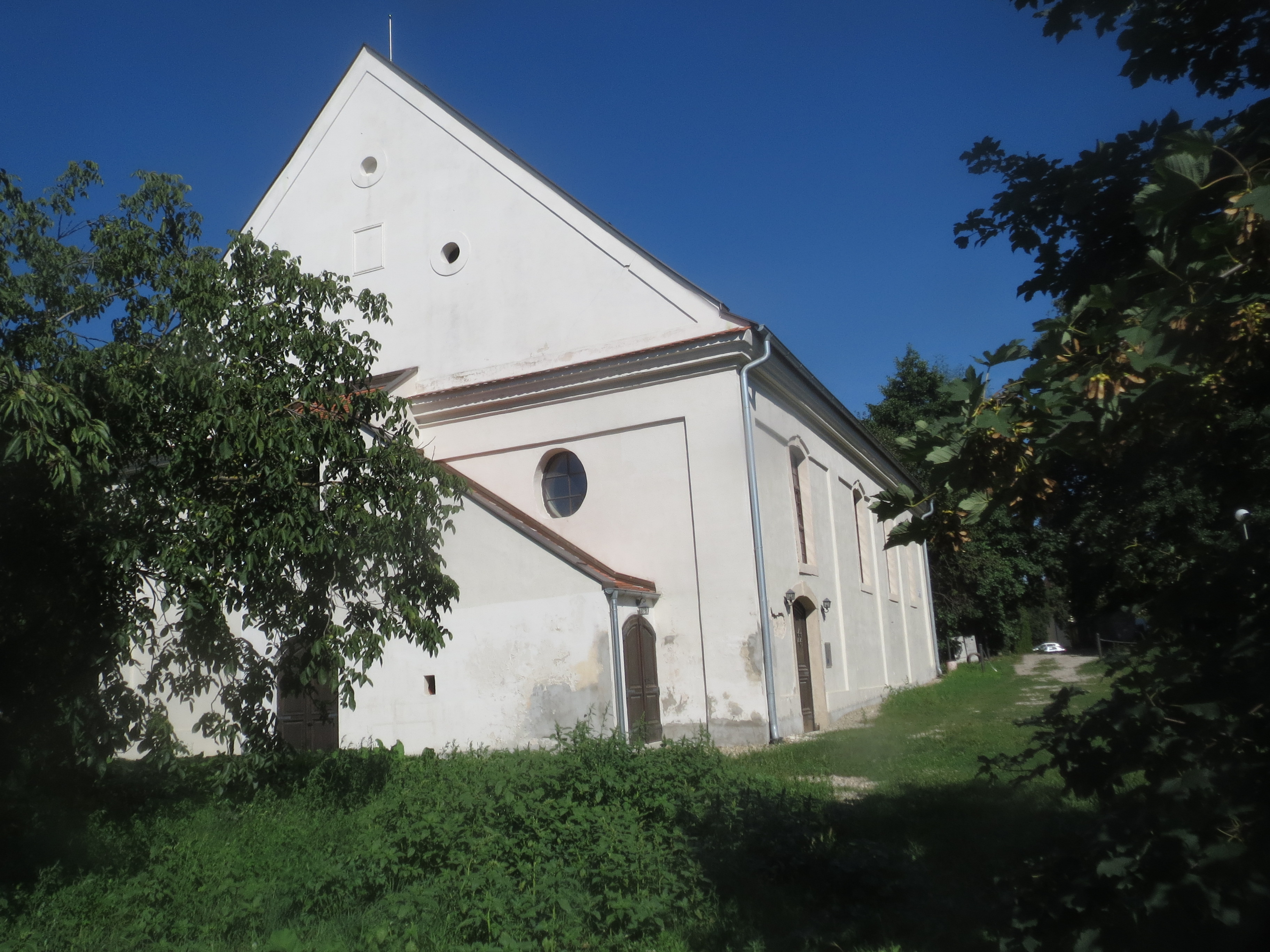
- The former synagogue, now cultural center, in 2020, after renovation

- Location of the former synagogue in Slovakia

Religion
- Affiliation: Judaism (former)
- Rite: Nusach Ashkenaz
- Ecclesiastical or organisational status: Synagogue (1803–1940s); Cultural center (since 2008)
- Status: Inactive (as a synagogue); Repurposed

Location
- Location: Hlavná ulica, Stupava, Malacky District, Bratislava Region
- Country: Slovakia
- Coordinates: 48°16′25″N 17°16′25″E

Architecture
- Type: Synagogue architecture
- Style: Baroque Revival
- Completed: 1803
- Materials: Concrete

The Stupava Synagogue is a former Jewish congregation and synagogue, located near Hlavná ulica, in Stupava, in the Malacky District of the Bratislava Region of Slovakia. The synagogue was completed in 1803 and was used as a place of worship until World War II. The building, still standing, has been repurposed as a cultural center. The congregation worshiped in the Ashkenazi rite.

== Architecture ==
Completed in 1803, the rectangular building is made of massive walls with simple Baroque Revival windows and has a saddleback roof. An external staircase, attached diagonally to the western facade, gives access to the women's gallery. Several oval ventilation openings in the gable are typical for the local architecture of the region.

The interior consists of the main prayer hall with a vestibule and study-room to the west. Above these is the women's prayer room. The prayer hall is of the nine-field (nine-bay) type, In these halls the vaulting rests on four tall pillars and on corresponding wall pilasters. The columns and the pilasters are situated in equal spacing and dividing the roof-area into nine equal fields. In these synagogues the bimah is a free-standing podium or a bower situated within the central field between the pillars. The former Stupava Synagogue and the Old Synagogue in Bardejov are the only two surviving buildings of this type in Slovakia.

Nothing remains of the original furnishing, though the bimah-platform has been preserved and the position of the Holy Ark is still visible and marked by a niche in the wall.

Restoration of the dilapidated building began in 2008 and the building is used for cultural purposes of the Slovak Jewish community.

== See also ==
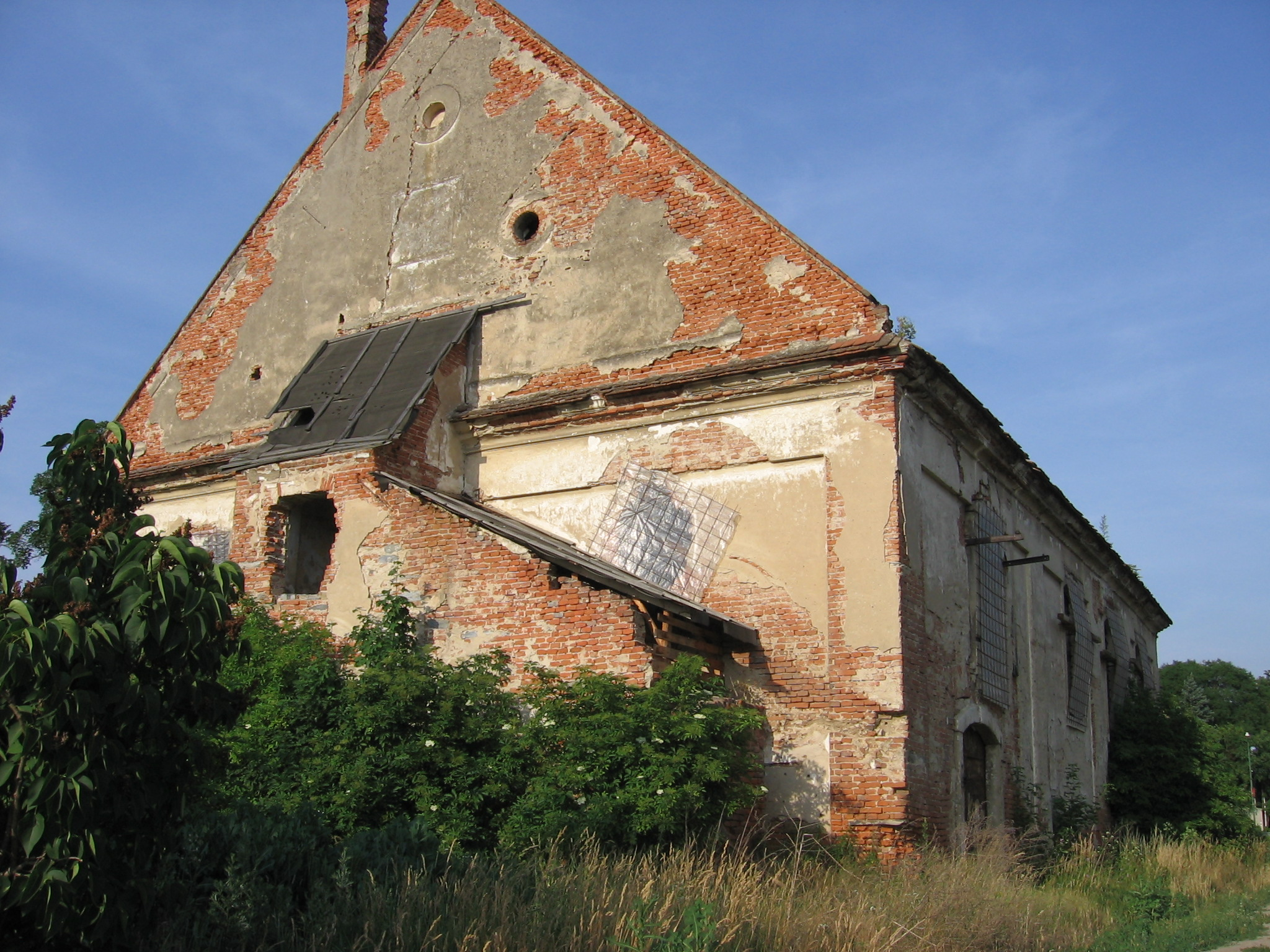
Back of building before renovation

- History of the Jews in Slovakia
- List of synagogues in Slovakia
