= Svätý Jur Synagogue =

Synagogue in Svätý Jur, Slovakia

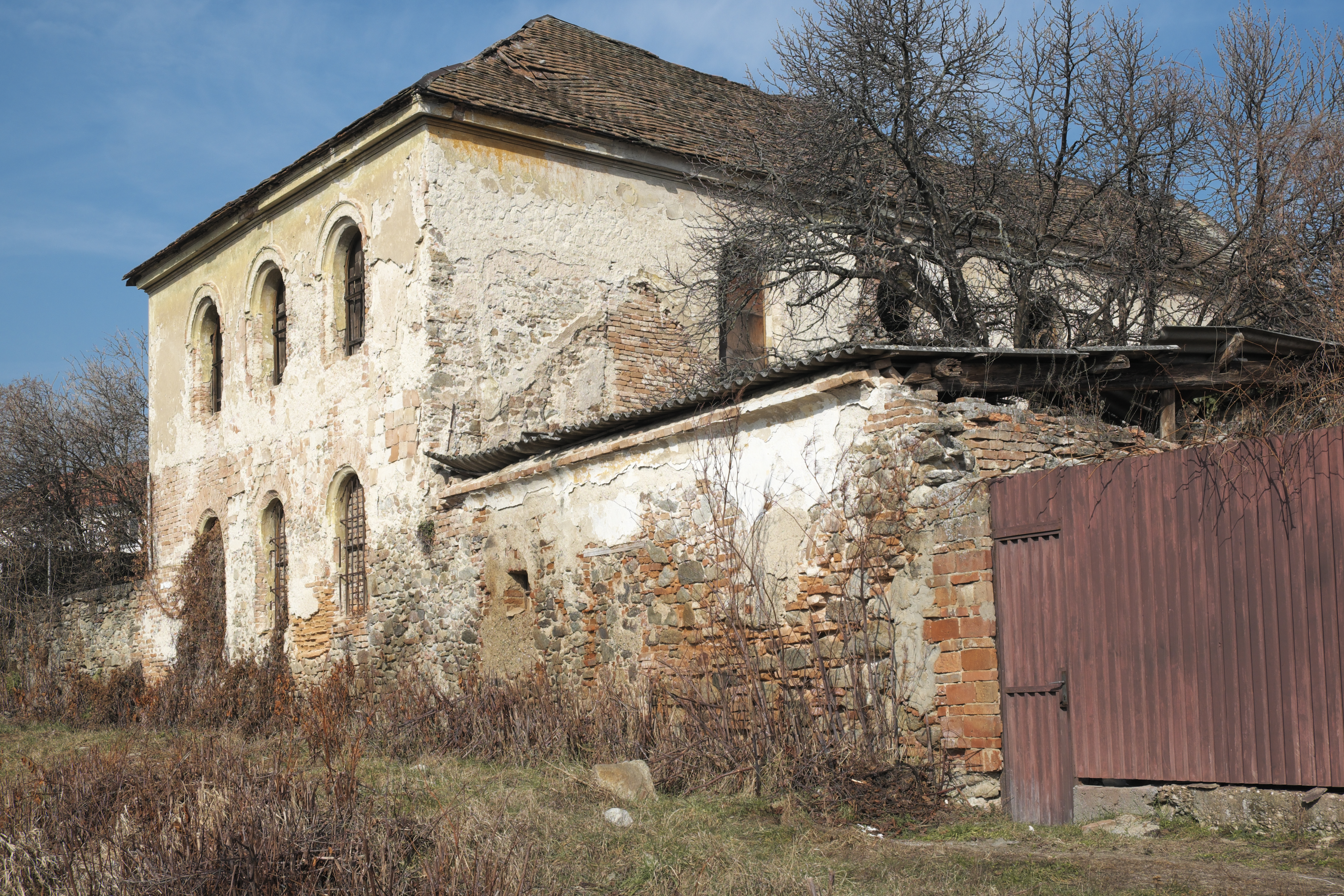
- The former synagogue in 2019

- Location of the former synagogue in Slovakia

Religion
- Affiliation: Judaism (former)
- Rite: Nusach Ashkenaz
- Ecclesiastical or organizational status: Synagogue (1790–1940s)
- Status: Abandoned (as a synagogue)

Location
- Location: Pezinská 21, Svätý Jur, Bratislava Region
- Country: Slovakia
- Interactive map of Svätý Jur Synagogue
- Coordinates: 48°15′19″N 17°12′50″E

Architecture
- Type: Synagogue architecture
- Style: Baroque
- Completed: 1790
- Materials: Brick

The Svätý Jur Synagogue is a former Jewish congregation and synagogue, located on Pezinská 21 in Svätý Jur, a small town in the Bratislava Region of Slovakia. Completed in c. 1790, the former synagogue building is privately owned and, as of 2024, is in a very poor condition.

== History ==
Evidence of a Jewish community in Svätý Jur dates from before 1529, when the Jews were expelled from the town. Settlement of individual Jewish families began again in the 17th century.

The synagogue dates from the late 18th century and resembles a late Baroque rural mansion. In 1876 the building underwent some reconstruction.

It stands in the former Jewish courtyard and was surrounded by other Jewish institutions. These were demolished by the current owner, who acquired the property after World War II.

Today it is used for storage and is dilapidated.

== Architecture ==
On the western side stands a doorway projection with vestibule and women's gallery above. Access to the gallery was through a covered staircase, attached next to it. The sanctuary (the men's prayer room) on the eastern side is a large rectangular hall, emphasised by three bays of windows in the Rundbogenstil.

The Holy Ark stood in the centre of the long side, flanked by two windows (also in Rundbogenstil) and a round window above. Today only an empty niche is visible.

Originally the women's gallery projection opened into the hall. When the synagogue underwent a reconstruction in 1876, interior walls were redecorated with Moorish Revival ornaments and a new women's gallery was constructed. This is supported by cast-iron columns and runs on three sides of the sanctuary.

== See also ==
- History of the Jews in Slovakia
- List of synagogues in Slovakia
