= New Synagogue (Žilina) =

Former synagogue in Žilina, Slovakia

- Slovak: Nová Synagóga
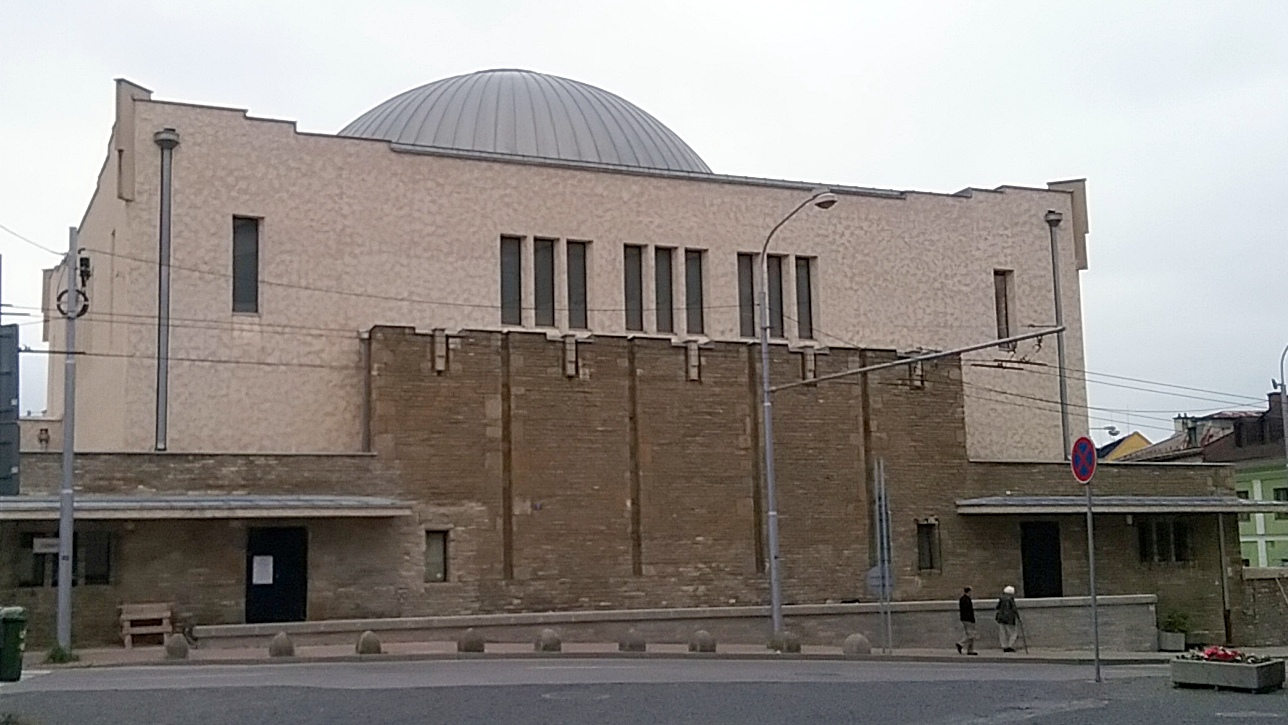
- The façade of the former synagogue in 2016, following restoration

- Location of the former synagogue in Slovakia

Religion
- Affiliation: Neolog Judaism (former)
- Rite: Nusach Ashkenaz
- Ecclesiastical or organizational status: Synagogue (1931–1940s); Profane use (1940s–2011); Arts center (since 2017)
- Status: Inactive (as a synagogue); Repurposed

Location
- Location: 1 Kuzmányho Street, Žilina
- Country: Slovakia
- Interactive map of New Synagogue
- Coordinates: 49°13′29″N 18°44′14″E

Architecture
- Architect: Peter Behrens
- Type: Synagogue architecture
- Style: Modernist
- Groundbreaking: 1928
- Completed: 1931

Specifications
- Capacity: 800 worshipers
- Dome: One
- Dome height (inner): 17.6 metres (58 ft)
- Dome dia. (inner): 16 metres (52 ft)
- Materials: Concrete

Website
- novasynagoga.sk/english-2

The New Synagogue (Slovak: Nová Synagóga), sometimes referred to as the Neological Synagogue (Slovak: Neologická synagóga) or Neolog Synagogue (Slovak: Synagóga Neológov), is a former Neolog Jewish congregation and synagogue, located in Žilina, Slovakia.

Completed in 1931 to the designs of the German Modernist architect Peter Behrens, it was completed eight years before World War II, which almost obliterated the Jewish population of Slovakia, (Note: The Jewish population of Slovakia fell from 136,737 in 1930 to about 30,000 in 1946.) and it has been called "the last Slovak synagogue". Having been used for other purposes after World War II, it was restored between 2011 and 2017 to become an arts center.

== History ==
The town of Žilina had been resistant to Jewish settlers and by the middle of the nineteenth century, only two Jewish families lived there. An early synagogue of c. 1860 was replaced by a new one in 1880. The Jewish community in Žilina continued to grow, reaching about 3,000 in the early 1930s. During the 1920s an international competition was launched for a modern synagogue for the Reform Judaism congregation; competitors included Lipót Baumhorn and Josef Hoffmann. The competition was won by Behrens and the synagogue was constructed between 1928 and 1931. In 1934 Behrens joined the Nazi Party and later worked on Hitler's plans for redesigning Berlin.

After World War II, from which only 600 Jews returned to the city, the building was taken over by the town for cultural purposes, including an assembly hall for Žilina University and a cinema.

Since 2012 the synagogue has been under restoration for use as an art gallery and cultural centre. From 2014, the work has carried out by the NGO Truc sphérique, with the aid of an EEA grant from Norway, Liechtenstein and Iceland and with the support of the town of Žilina and the town's remaining Jewish community. Work included restoration of wall surfaces in the interior and the façade of the building. The synagogue building opened for events in August 2016 and the restoration was completed in July 2017.

== Design ==
The synagogue was built to accommodate 450 men in the prayer hall with 350 women in the galleries. The hall features high, narrow windows. The dome over the hall has a diameter of 16 metres (52 ft) and a height of 17.6 metres (58 ft). The low front entrance is accessed by a flight of steps from street level. The front façade was considerably altered in the period 1945-1980. The congregational hall retained its domed structure, but the women's galleries which lined the upper storey were removed. The 2017 restorations reinstated many of the original interior and design features.

== Gallery ==
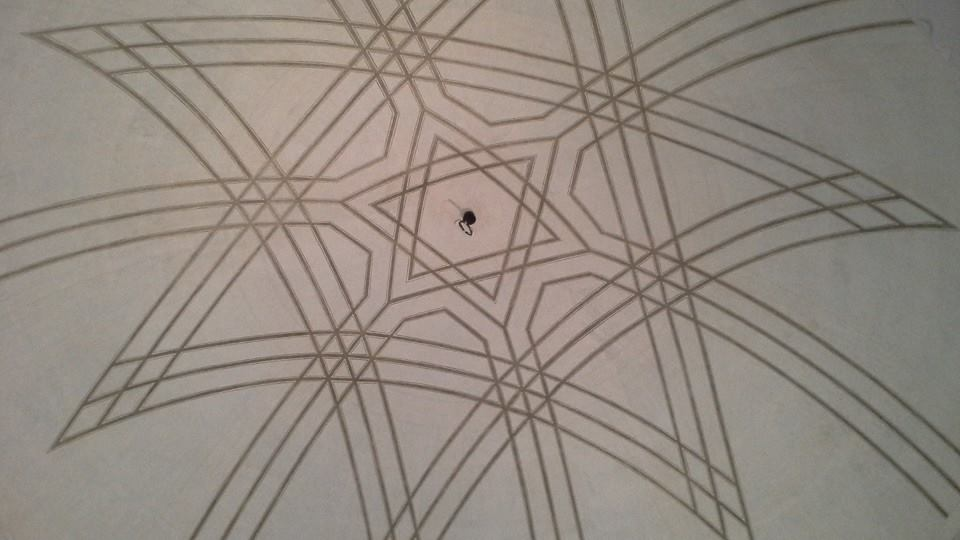
Interior of the restored dome of the synagogue

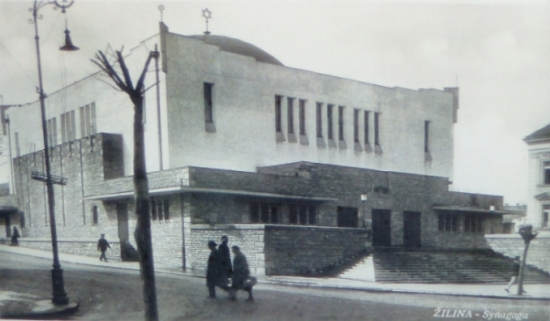
The synagogue shortly after completion, from a postcard, c. 1931

== See also ==
- History of the Jews in Slovakia
- List of synagogues in Slovakia
