= New Orthodox Synagogue (Košice) =

Orthodox synagogue in Košice, Slovakia

- Slovak: Nová ortodoxná synagóga
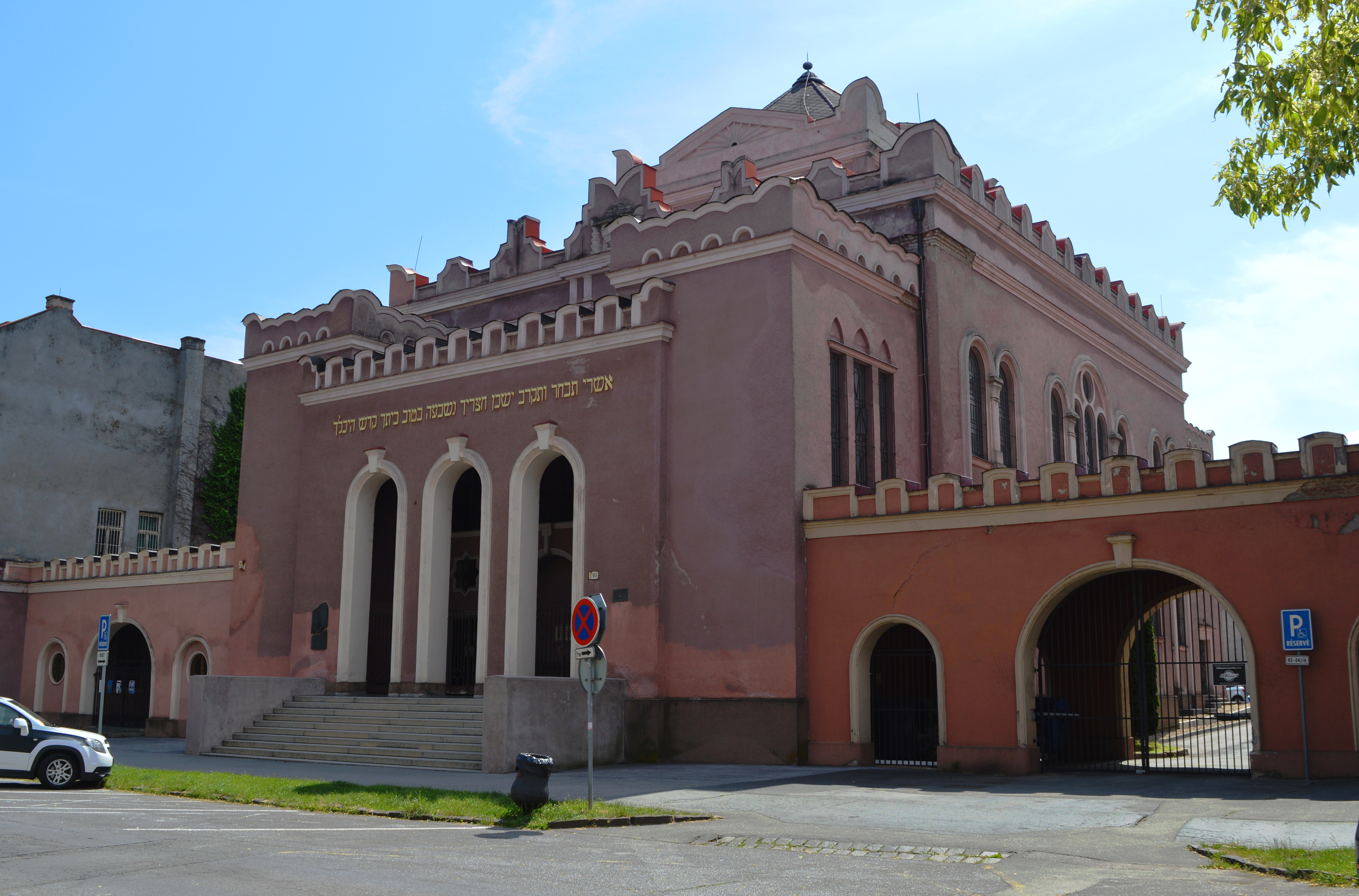
- The synagogue in 2021

- Location of the synagogue in Slovakia

Religion
- Affiliation: Orthodox Judaism
- Rite: Nusach Ashkenaz
- Ecclesiastical or organizational status: Synagogue
- Status: Active

Location
- Location: Puškinova Street, Košice
- Country: Slovakia
- Interactive map of New Orthodox Synagogue
- Coordinates: 48°43′13″N 21°15′43″E

Architecture
- Architect: Ľudovít Oelschläger
- Type: Synagogue architecture
- Style: Neo-classical; Modernist (interior)
- Completed: 1927

Specifications
- Capacity: 800 worshipers
- Dome: One
- Materials: Concrete

Website
- kehilakosice.sk

The New Orthodox Synagogue (Slovak: Nová ortodoxná synagóga) is an Orthodox Jewish congregation and synagogue, located at Puškinova Street near the historic centre of Košice, Slovakia. The congregation worships in the Ashkenazi rite.

== History ==
The Jews to settle in Košice arrived after 1840, when the legal ban on Jewish residence was lifted. In 1930, the city's more than 11,500 Jews made up 16.4 percent of the city's population. Before The Holocaust, Košice was home to one of the largest and most important Jewish communities in Slovakia. The Old Orthodox Synagogue in Zvonárska Street, constructed in 1899 to the design of János Balogh, that, as of July 2024, is still standing, and was used as a place of worship until World War II.

The New Synagogue, completed in 1927, was designed by the Budapest-educated architect Ľudovít Oelschläger. The façade uses both Neo-classical and local traditional motifs; and example of the latter is the attic storey in a style often found in renaissance buildings of Eastern Slovakia. The interior, largely constructed in concrete, is in the Modernist style with a domed central hall and a women's gallery with a metal mechitzah. The central bimah faces a Torah ark made of red marble. A school was built adjoining the synagogue and a mikveh (ritual bath) was planned but not constructed.

== Holocaust memorial plate ==
Transports of Jews from Kosice to Nazi concentration and death camps were carried out during World War II. A bronze Holocaust memorial plate was installed on the front of the synagogue in 1992. It informs that more than 12,000 Jews of Košice were taken to concentration camps in 1944. It does not mention that more than 2,000 Jews from Košice's surroundings were concentrated here and then also sent to the concentration camps. Only 400 of all transported Jews survived.

== Gallery ==
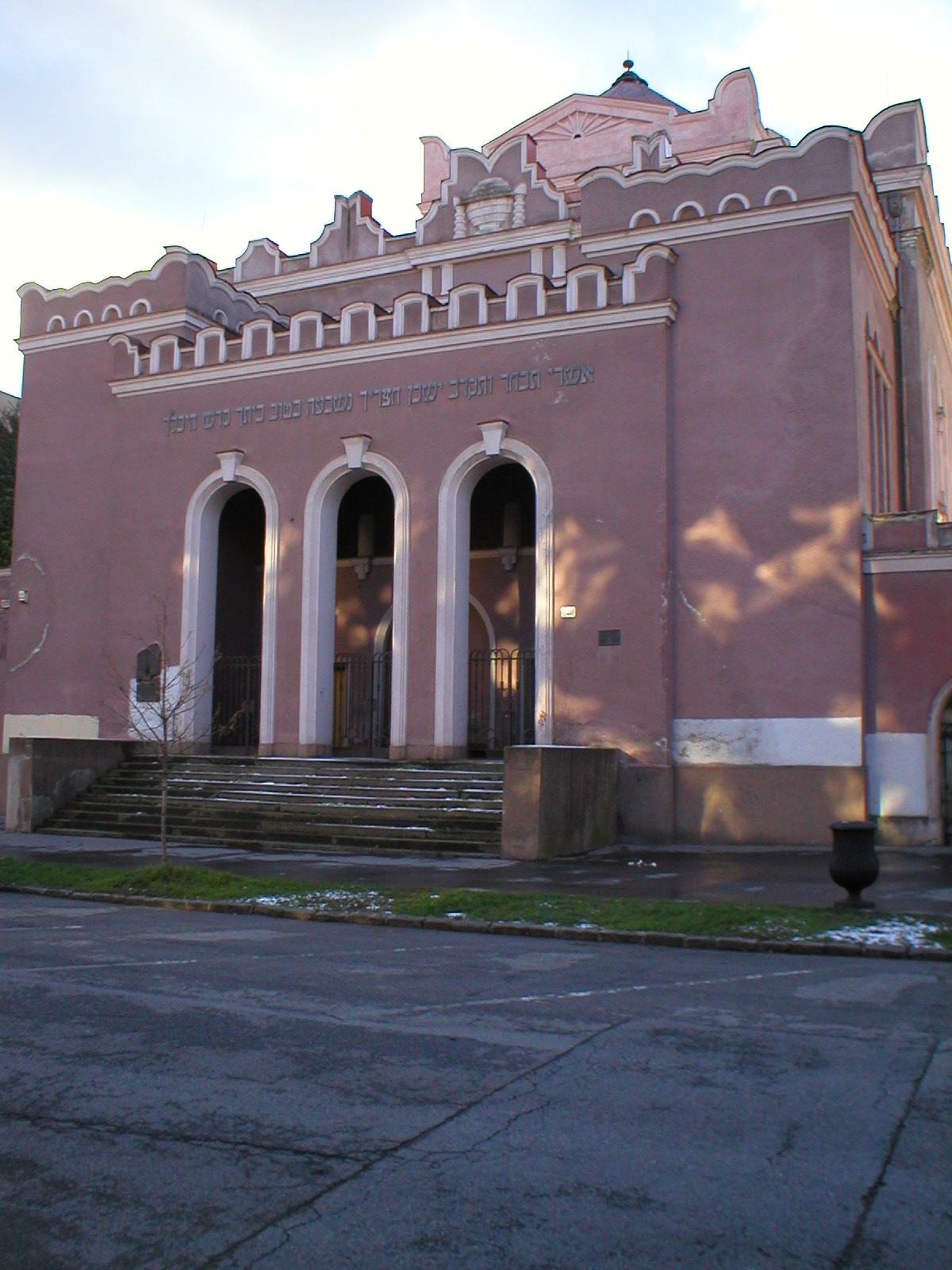
The synagogue exterior

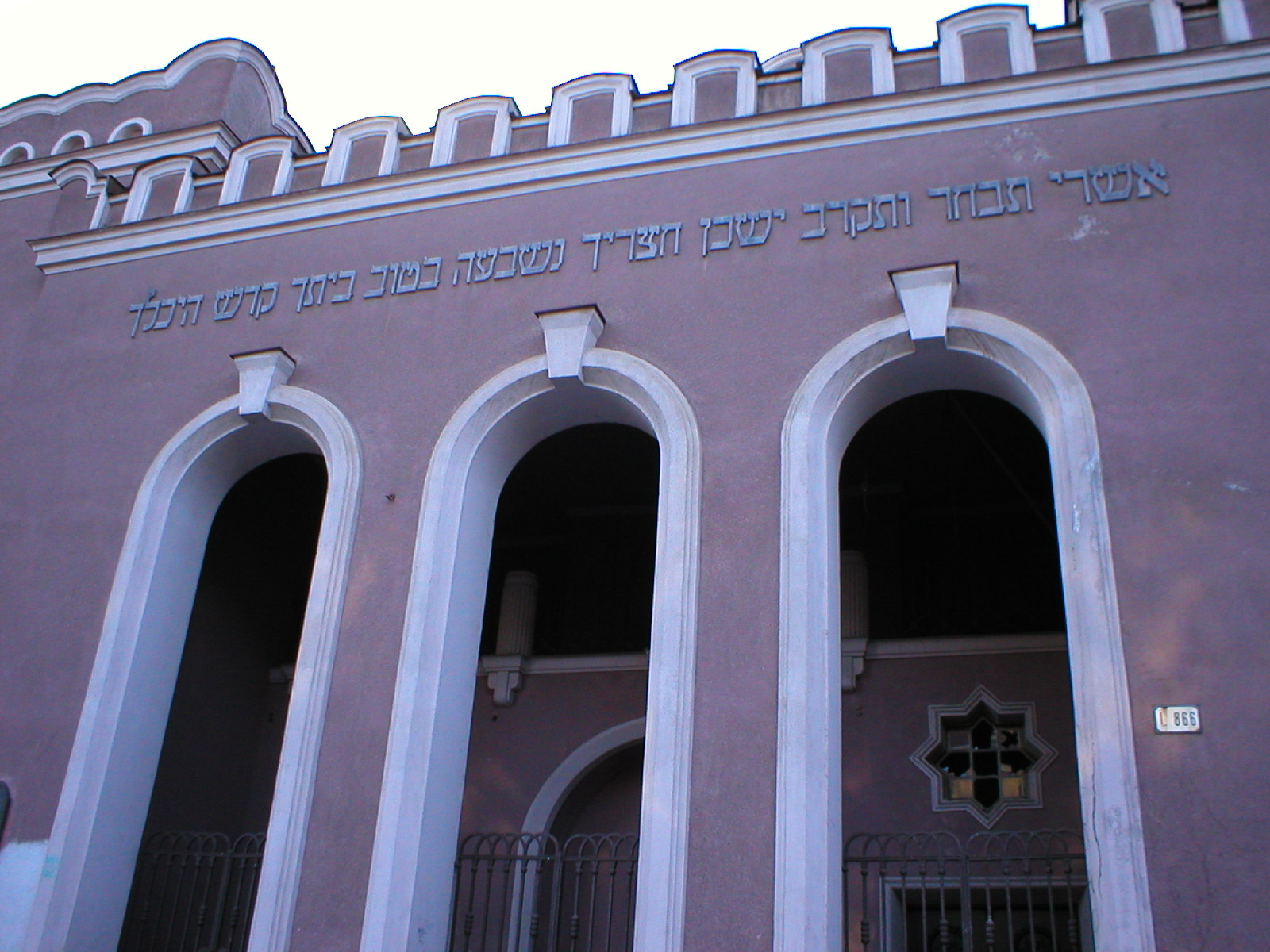
Detail of the synagogue

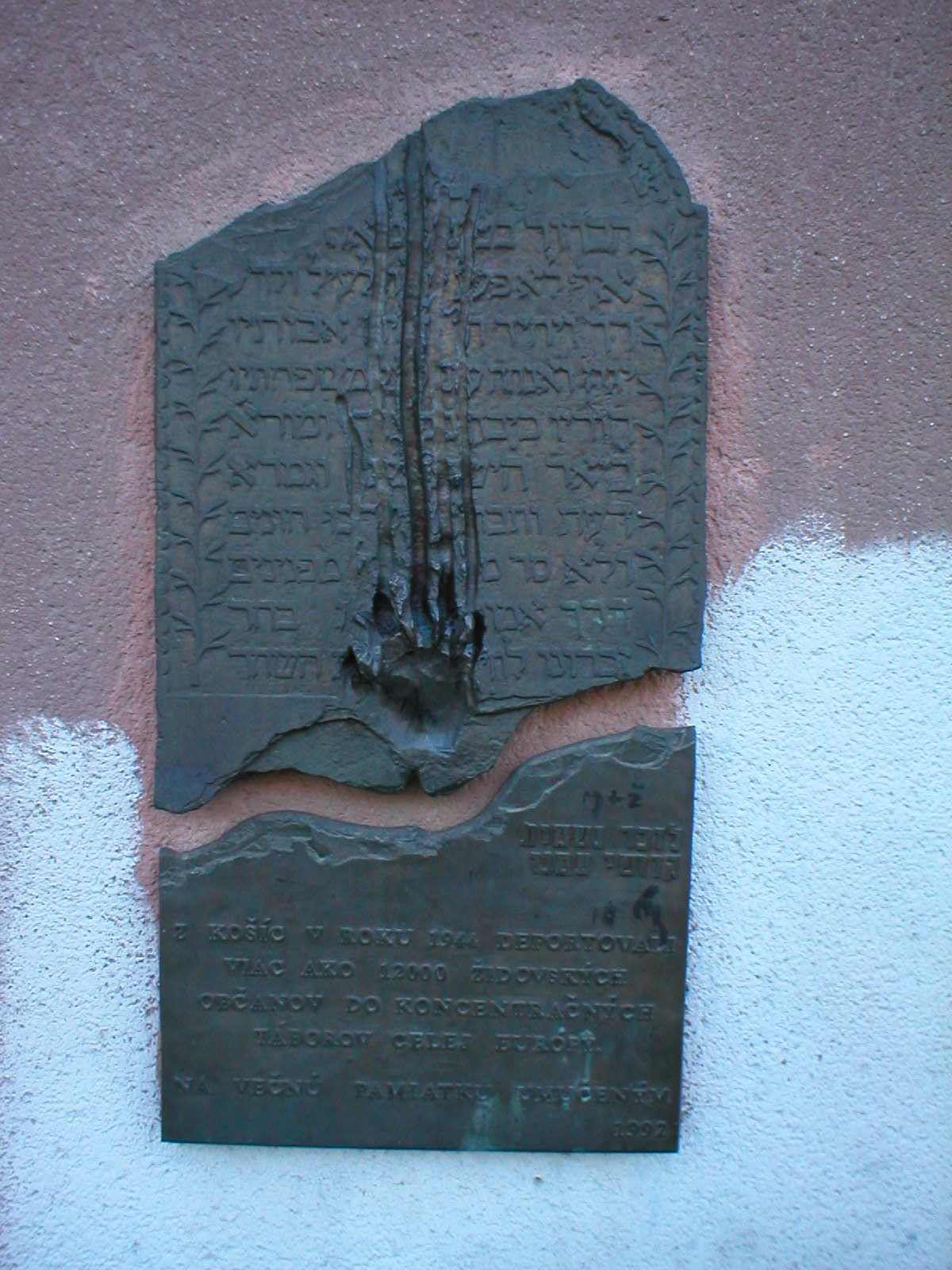
The Holocaust memorial plate

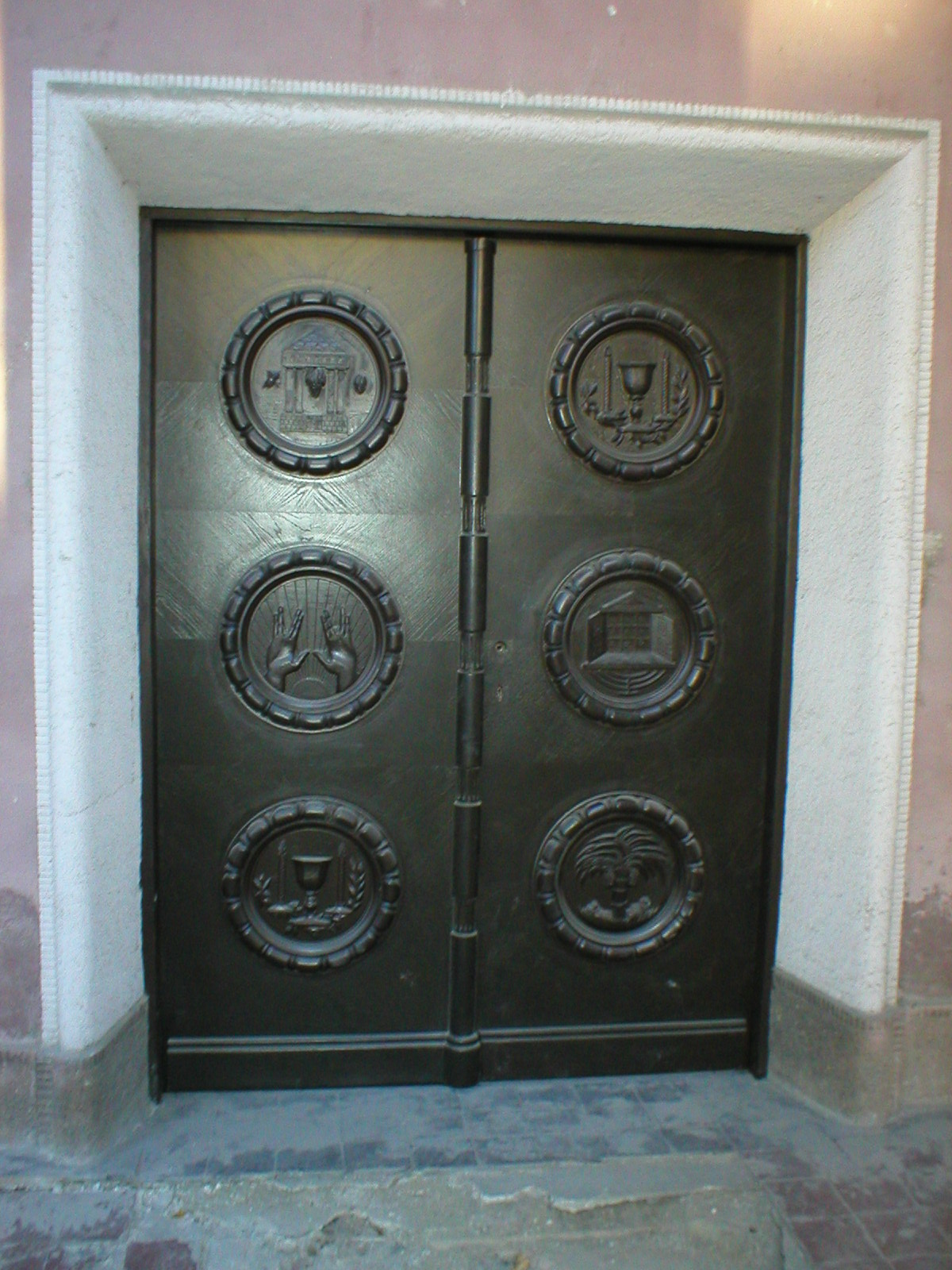
Detail of the synagogue

== See also ==
- History of the Jews in Slovakia
- List of synagogues in Slovakia
