= Šúr =

Coordinates: 48.2367°N 17.2333°E

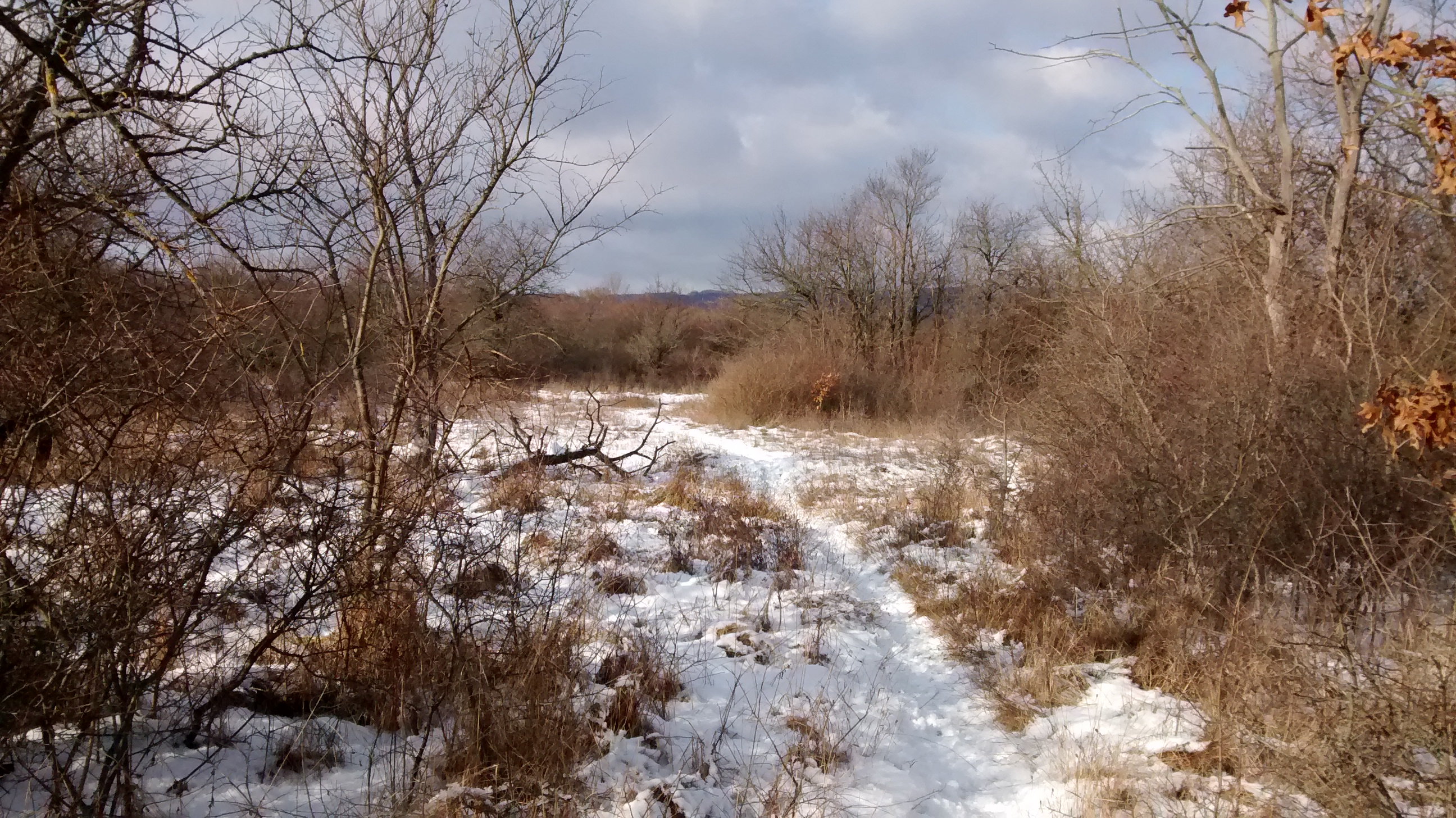
- Šúr in winter
- Interactive map of Šúr
- Area: 6.55 km^{2} (2.53 sq mi)
- Established: 1952

Ramsar Wetland
- Official name: Súr
- Designated: 2 July 1990
- Reference no.: 498

Šúr is a national nature reserve in the Slovak municipalities of Svätý Jur and Chorvátsky Grob in the Pezinok District. The nature reserve covers an area of 655 ha and has a protective belt of 145 ha. It has a protection level of 3, 4 and 5 under the Slovak nature protection system. It was established in 1952 to protect one of the last and largest remnants of a tall-stem swamp alder forest. Around it are the remnants of wet and peat bog meadows. The area also hosts some xerophilous biotopes and has a rich species diversity on a small area including a number of endangered species.
