= Coat of arms of Svätý Jur =

Slovakian coat of arms

- Armiger: City of Svätý Jur
- Adopted: 1647

The coat of arms of Svätý Jur (German: Sankt Georgen, Hungarian: Szentgyörgy, English: Saint George) were officially granted on June 14, 1647, but the use of it on seals dates from the 15th century.

The arms show knight Saint George sitting on the horse holding a shield with painted white cross in his right hand while sword holding in his left hand. There is a dragon placed in the lower section of the coat of arms.

== Sources ==
- Official document of coat of arms and flag of Svätý Jur on the Svätý Jur official website (in Slovak)
- (in Slovak)

== Bibliography ==
- Kartous et al, 1991; Slowakei - Spaziergänge durch die Jahrhunderte der Städte und Städchen. Piroda, Bratislava, 1994 (German version, ISBN 80-07-00531-5)
