= Vrbové =

- Municipality
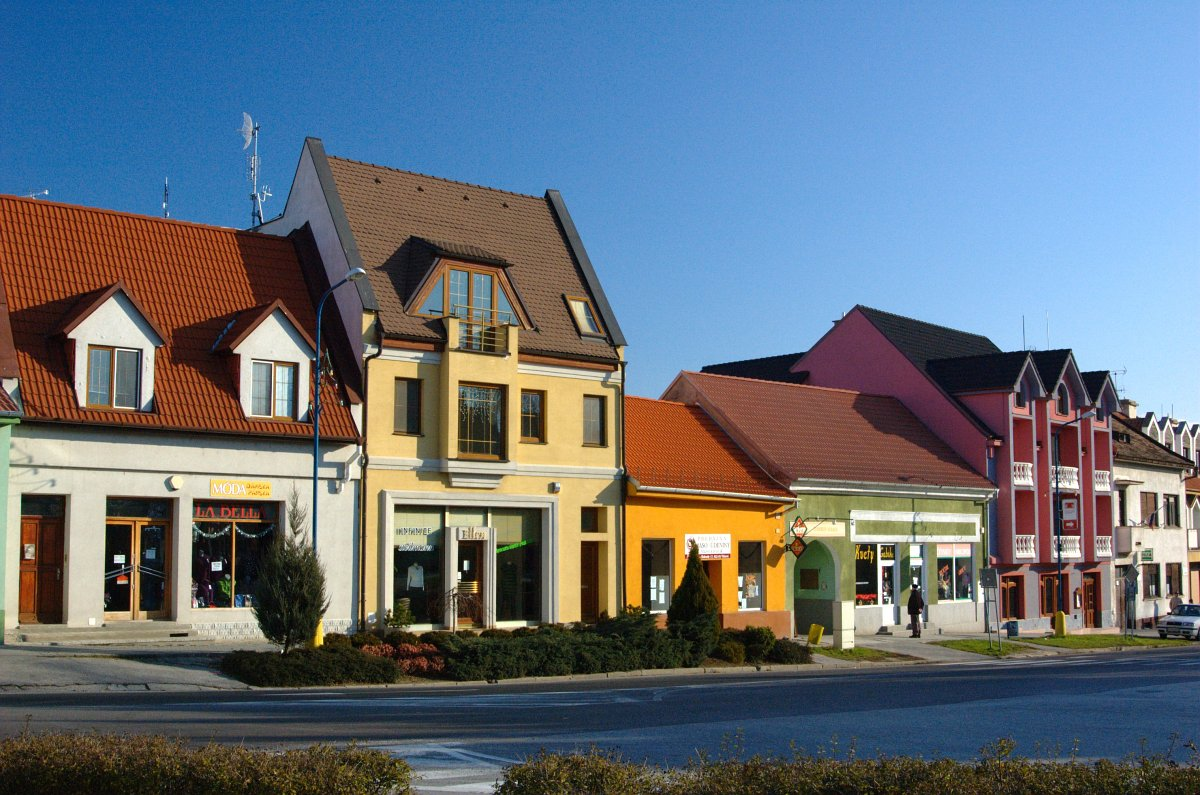

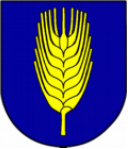
- Flag Coat of arms

- Location of Vrbové in the Trnava Region Location of Vrbové in Slovakia
- Coordinates: 48.62°N 17.72°E
- Country: Slovakia
- Region: Trnava Region
- District: Piešťany District
- First mentioned: 1332

Government
  - Mayor: Dott. Mgr. Ema Maggiová

Area
  - Total: 13.96 km^{2} (5.39 sq mi)
- Elevation: 182 m (597 ft)

Population (2025)
  - Total: 5,523
- Time zone: UTC+1 (CET)
  - Summer (DST): UTC+2 (CEST)
- Postal code: 922 03
- Area code: +421 33
- Vehicle registration plate (until 2022): PN
- Website: www.vrbove.sk

Vrbové (German: Vrbau (modernized: Werbau); Hungarian: Verbó) is a town in the Trnava Region of Slovakia. It has a population of about 6,000. The town lies around 8 km (5 mi) northwest from Piešťany.

== Characteristics ==
The town features an originally Gothic church from 1397, an Evangelical Lutheran church from 1928–1929 (on the site of an older Protestant church of 1784), a baroque curia from the 17th century, an oriental-style synagogue from 1883, and a modern St. Gorazd Church.

The Čerenec Dam (0.46 km²), situated to the northwest of the town, is a recreation area.

== Geography ==
The municipality lies at an altitude of 182 metres (597 ft) and covers an area of 13.96 km^{2} (5.39 sq mi) (2025).

== History ==
The present-day town is a very old settlement. The name of the town is derived from a Slavic word for willow. The first written reference to the town stems from 1332, at that time it was part of the Čachtice Castle domain. The town was famous for its grain markets, promoted mainly by Jews, who made up a large part of the town's population. In the late 20th century, the town was home to clothing (Trikota works), trading and wood-processing industries.

=== World War II ===
During World War II, the entire town of Vrbové was a ghetto for the Jewish population of the Piešťany province of Slovakia. The ghetto was liquidated by the Slovak Nazis known as the Hlinka Guard and the German SS; most of the Jewish people were deported to the death camp at Auschwitz. Most of Vrbove's Jewish population was gassed in Auschwitz's gas chambers.

== Population ==
Population statistic (10 years)
Year	1995	2005	2015	2025
Count	6190	6309	6051	5523
Difference		+1.92%	−4.08%	−8.72%

Population statistic
Year	2024	2025
Count	5554	5523
Difference		−0.55%

It has a population of 5523 people (31 December 2025).

=== Ethnicity ===
Census 2021 (1+%)
Ethnicity	Number	Fraction
Slovak	5514	96.07%
Not found out	197	3.43%
Total	5739	

In year 2021 was 5739 people by ethnicity 5514 as Slovak, 197 as Not found out, 37 as Czech, 19 as Russian, 15 as Other, 6 as Hungarian, 6 as English, 5 as Rusyn, 4 as Ukrainian, 4 as Italian, 4 as Romani, 3 as German, 2 as Polish, 1 as Jewish, 1 as Vietnamese, 1 as Moravian and 1 as French.

Note on population: The difference values of population numbers in the table "Population statistic" and in the sections "Ethnicity" & "Religion" is caused by the use of various statistical methods.

=== Religion ===
Census 2021 (1+%)
Religion	Number	Fraction
Roman Catholic Church	3371	58.74%
None	1515	26.4%
Evangelical Church	438	7.63%
Not found out	254	4.43%
Total	5739	

In year 2021 was 5739 people by religion 3371 from Roman Catholic Church, 1515 from None, 438 from Evangelical Church, 254 from Not found out, 36 from Ad hoc movements, 26 from Jehovah's Witnesses, 21 from Greek Catholic Church, 18 from Eastern Orthodox Church, 14 from Other, 13 from Buddhism, 6 from Other and not ascertained christian church, 6 from Islam, 5 from Paganism and natural spirituality, 5 from Christian Congregations in Slovakia, 4 from Calvinist Church, 3 from United Methodist Church, 2 from Jewish community, 1 from Old Catholic Church and 1 from Baptists Church.

According to the 2001 census, the town had 6,249 inhabitants. 98.75% of inhabitants were Slovaks and 0.59% Czechs. The religious make-up was 75.48% Roman Catholics, 10.80% people with no religious affiliation and 10.67% Lutherans.

== Twin towns – sister cities ==
Vrbové is twinned with:

- Vítkov, Czech Republic

== People ==
=== Rabbis ===
- Rabbi David Zvi Hoffmann was born there in 1843.
- Vrbové is the birthplace of Rabbi Yosef Chaim Sonnenfeld, the Chief Rabbi of Jerusalem.
- The Chief Rabbi of Vrbové, Rabbi Samuel Reich, son of Rabbi Jaakov Koppel Reich, survived the Holocaust and emigrated to Jerusalem, where he later died. Before the Second World War he founded a Commerce school which was later nationalized.
- Rabbi Izsák Weiss of Vrbové was the author of works including Siach Yitschack, Elef Ksav, Avnei Beis Hayotser, Hagada Shel Pesach Siach Yitschack and Bina leitim. He was killed in the Holocaust in 1942. His works were sponsored by the Werner family from Vrbové and published by Shem Olam in Bnei Brak.

=== Other people ===
Vrbové is also the birthplace of:

- Maurice Benyovszky, the discoverer
- Bishop Pavol Jantausch
- Jozef Adamec, Slovak football forward
- Elo Šándor, the Slovak writer

== See also ==
- Synagogue (Vrbové)
- Vrbovce, Slovakia
