= Svätý Jur =

- Town
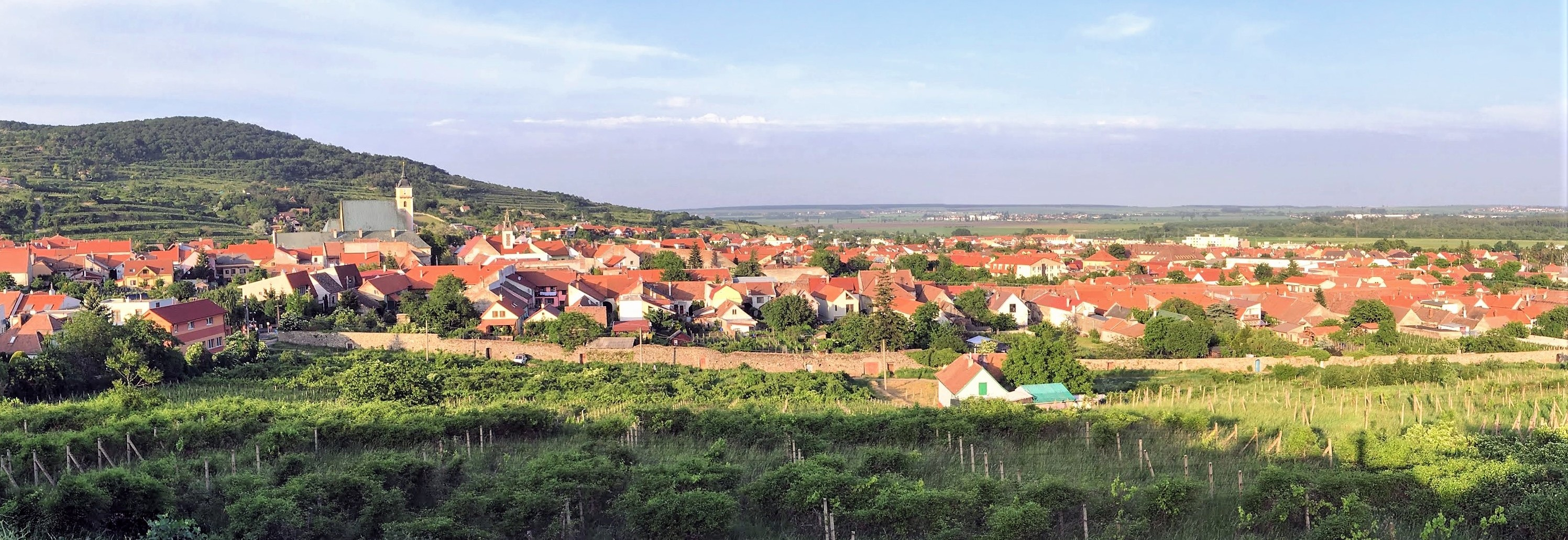
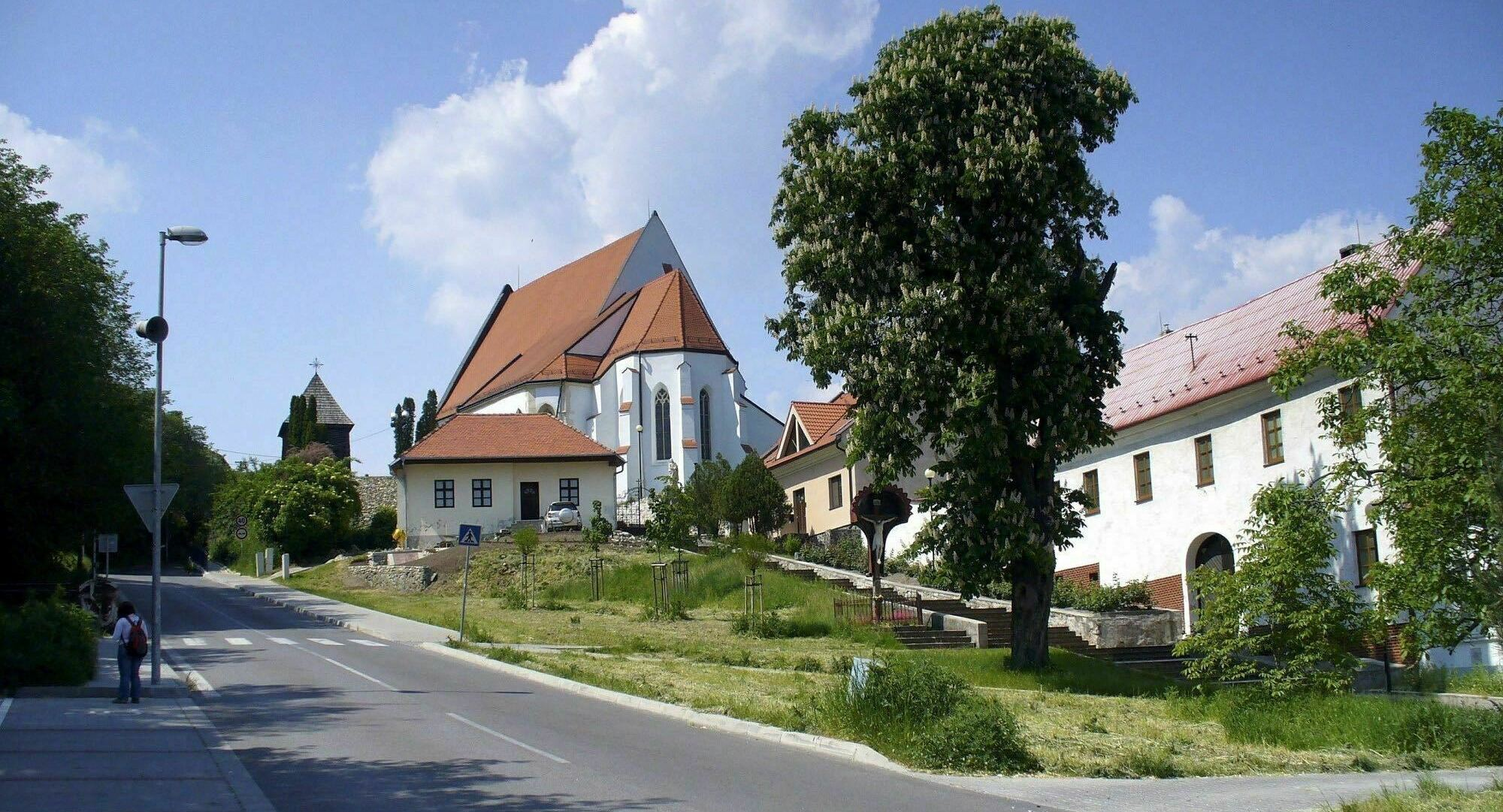
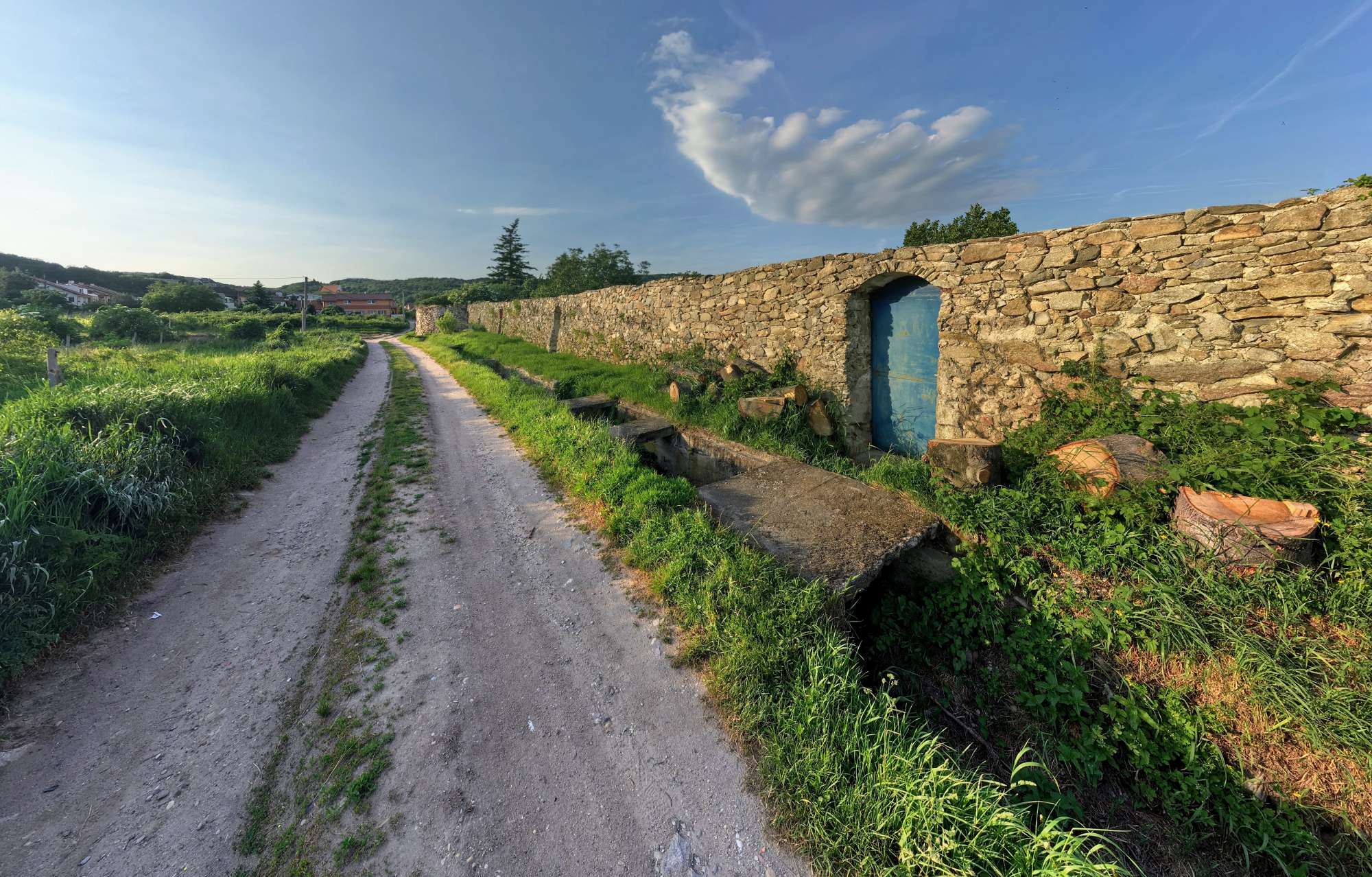
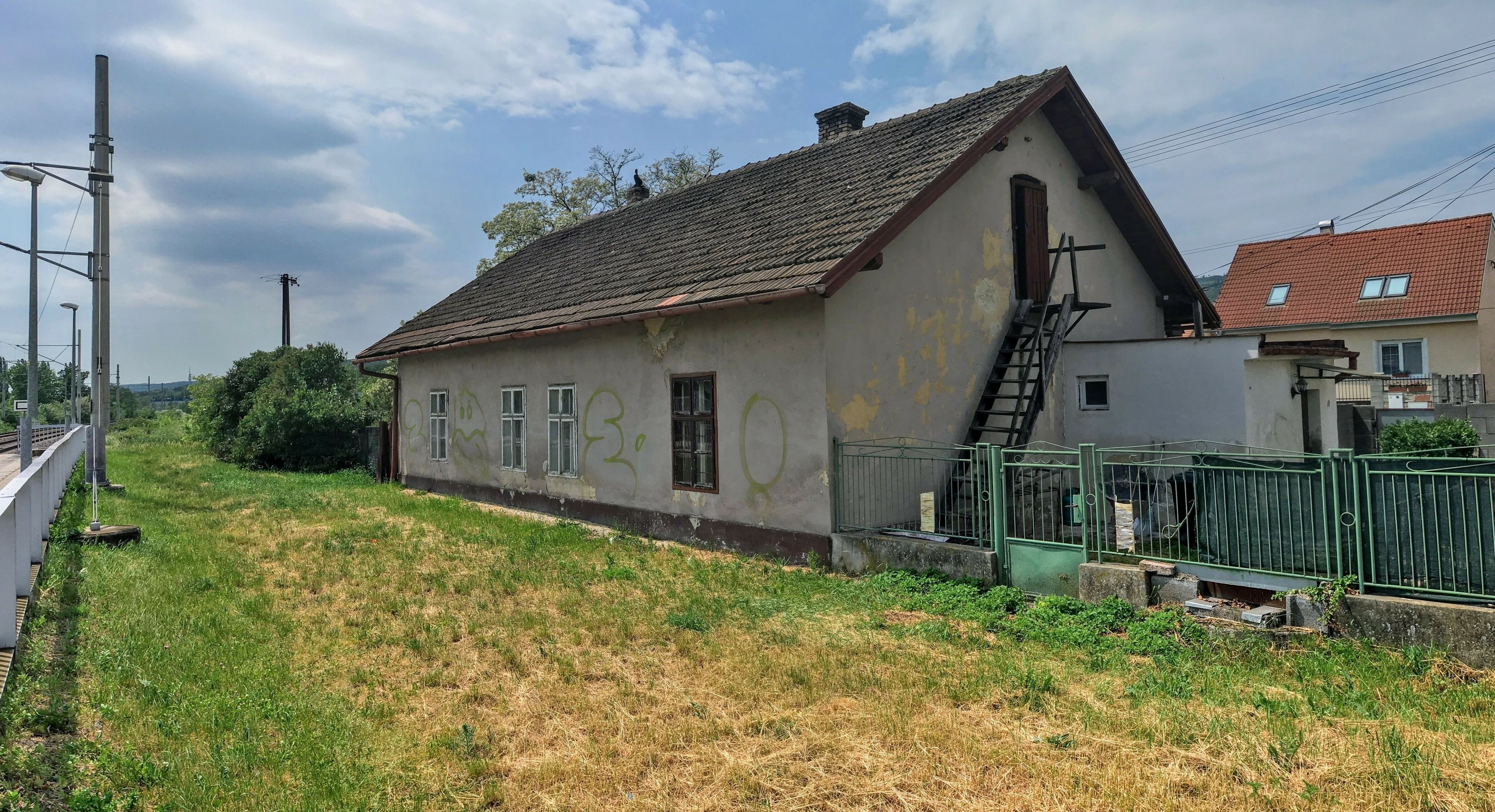
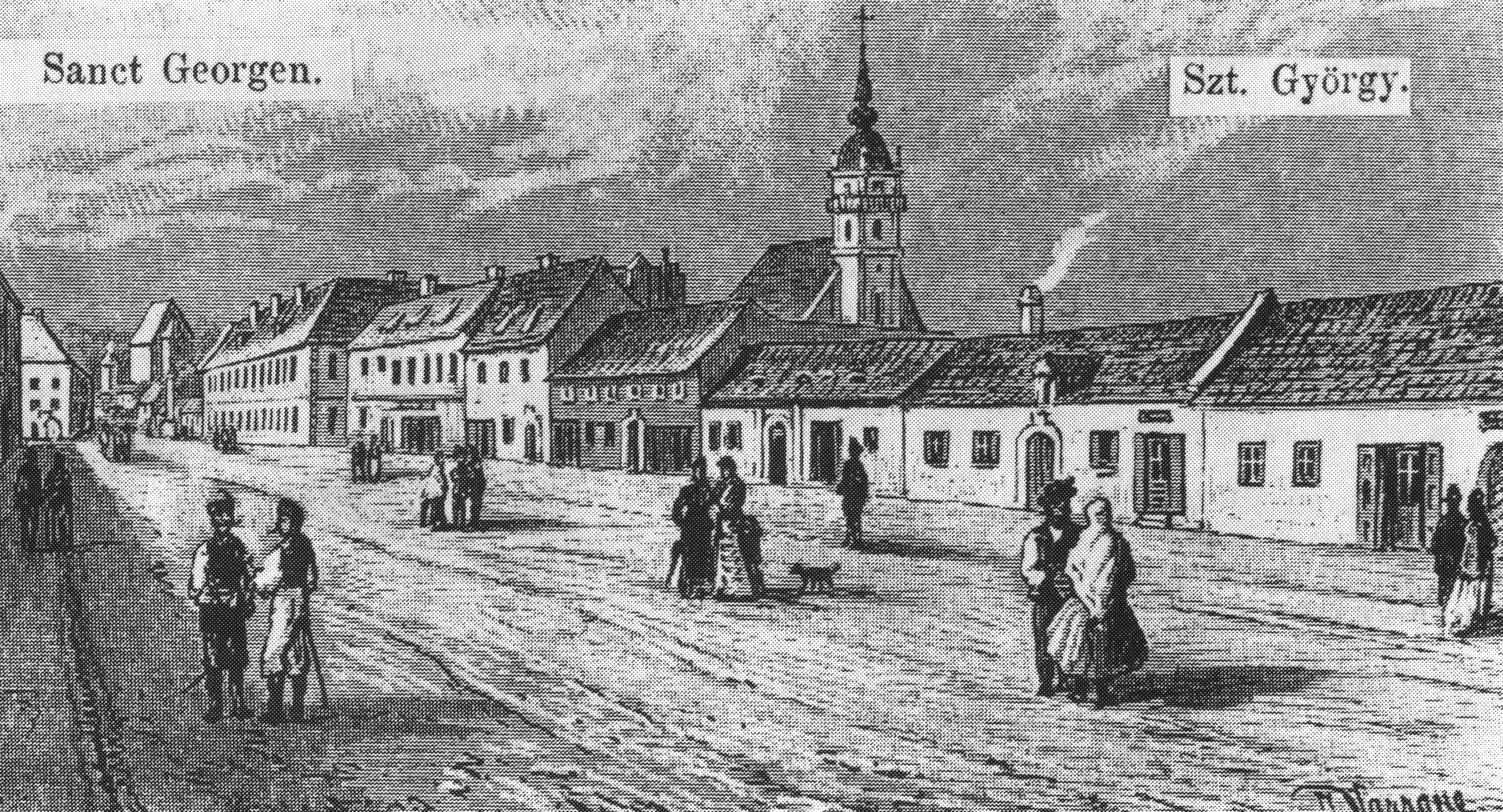
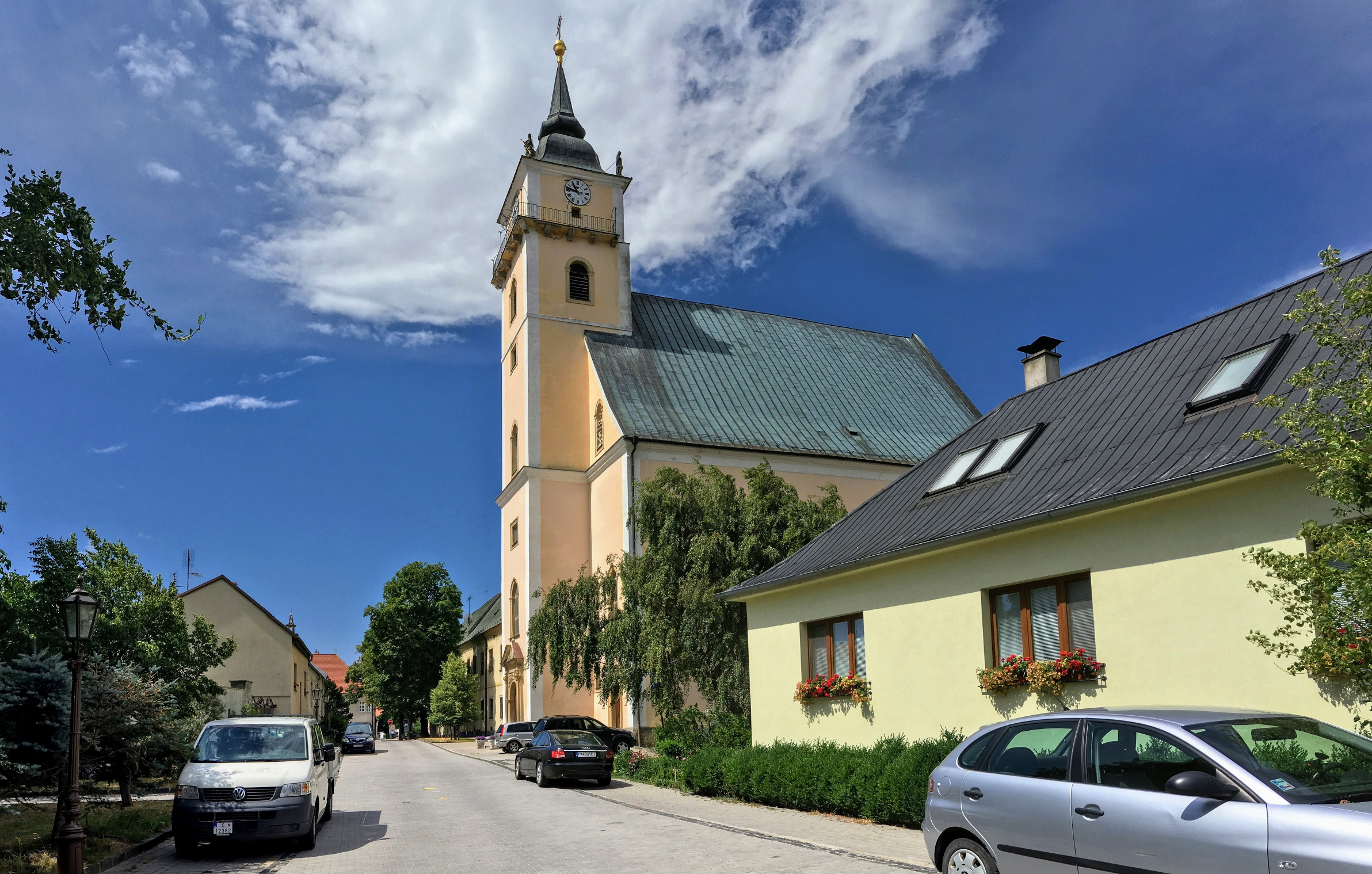
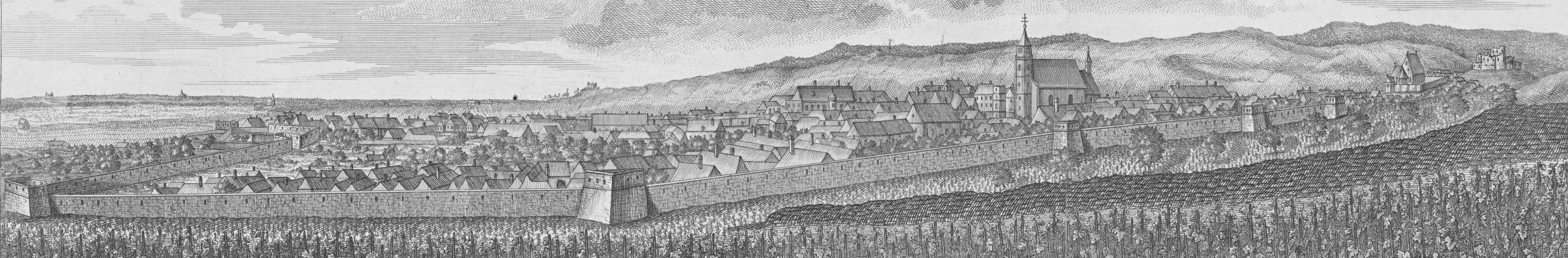
- From top, left to right: City panorama, St. George church (12th century), City walls (17th century), Horsecar station (1840), 19th century town square, Holy Trinity church, Svätý Jur in 1735

- Flag Coat of arms

- Location of Svätý Jur in the Bratislava Region Svätý Jur (Slovakia)
- Coordinates: 48°15′07″N 17°12′56″E
- Country: Slovakia
- Region: Bratislava Region
- District: Pezinok District
- First mentioned: 1209

Government
  - Mayor: Šimon Gabura

Area
  - Total: 39.86 km^{2} (15.39 sq mi)
- (2022)
- Elevation: 147 m (482 ft)

Population (2025)
  - Total: 5,997
- Time zone: UTC+1 (CET)
  - Summer (DST): UTC+2 (CEST)
- Postal code: 900 21
- Area code: +421 2
- Vehicle registration plate (until 2022): PK
- Website: www.svatyjur.sk

Svätý Jur (Slovak pronunciation: [sʋɛɐtiː ˈjur]; German: Sankt Georgen; Hebrew: Yergen; Hungarian: Szentgyörgy; formerly Jur pri Bratislave) is a small historical town northeast of Bratislava, located in the Bratislava Region. The city is situated on the slopes of Little Carpathians mountains and surrounded by typical terraced vineyards with more than 700 years of winemaking tradition. In 1990, the intact city center was declared a protected city reservation. Cadastrially, Svätý Jur includes also the natural reserve Šúr, established in 1952 to protect one of the last and largest remnants of a tall-stem swamp alder forest in Central Europe.

Today, Svätý Jur has a population of almost 6,000 citizens. The town is well connected with a major road between Pezinok and Bratislava passing through and the Svätý Jur railway station situated on the main Košice - Bratislava railway line. The city is bordered by the Little Carpathian mountains to the west, Bratislava to the south, natural reserve Šúr to the east and Limbach and Pezinok to the north and northeast respectively.

== Etymology ==
The city name translates literally as Saint George, Jur being the archaic form of Juraj in the Slovak. Between 1960 and 1990, the Communist government renamed the town to Jur pri Bratislave.

== Geography ==
The municipality lies at an altitude of 147 metres (482 ft) and covers an area of 39.86 km^{2} (15.39 sq mi) (2025).

Svätý Jur is situated in the Pezinok District of the Bratislava Region in southwestern Slovakia. The surrounding areas include large vineyards in the nearby Little Carpathians and the unique Šúr swamps, a protected area.

== History ==
Archaeological excavations date the original settlement to the Hallstatt period and the Quadi period.

In the 9th century, a Great Moravian castle was built here. Svätý Jur was first mentioned in a written source in 1209 and received a town charter in 1299. It became a royal free town in the Kingdom of Hungary in 1647.

Defensive city walls were constructed between 1603 and 1664, but Svätý Jur was devastated by the Ottoman Turks in their invasion of 1663. The Ottoman troops also destroyed the White Castle (Slovak: Biely Kameň), which had been an important administrative center of the region until then.

In the 18th century, the Hungarian government recruited German farmers to repopulate the area. To encourage migration, it allowed the Germans to keep their language and religion in order to develop farmland for cultivation and produce. Through the 19th century and into the 20th century, the population of this area was largely ethnic German, although by that time they spoke an archaic form of German. They were known as Danube Swabians. In part because Nazi Germany used the eastern ethnic German communities as an excuse for its wars of expansion in eastern Europe, after World War II, ethnic Germans were forcefully expelled to Germany and other Western countries.

In 1840, the first (horse) railway in the Kingdom of Hungary was built from Bratislava to Svätý Jur.

== Population ==
Population statistic (10 years)
Year	1995	2005	2015	2025
Count	4482	4836	5523	5997
Difference		+7.89%	+14.20%	+8.58%

Population statistic
Year	2024	2025
Count	6010	5997
Difference		−0.21%

It has a population of 5997 people (31 December 2025).

=== Ethnicity ===
Census 2021 (1+ %)
Ethnicity	Number	Fraction
Slovak	5600	94.26%
Not found out	228	3.83%
Czech	62	1.04%
Hungarian	60	1%
Total	5941	

In year 2021 was 5941 people by ethnicity 5600 as Slovak, 228 as Not found out, 62 as Czech, 60 as Hungarian, 46 as Other, 23 as Rusyn, 18 as Ukrainian, 18 as German, 13 as Croatian, 11 as Russian, 7 as Polish, 7 as Greek, 5 as Romanian, 4 as Italian, 4 as Austrian, 4 as Bulgarian, 3 as Romani, 3 as French, 3 as English, 2 as Moravian, 1 as Canadian and 1 as Albanian.

Note on population: The difference values of population numbers in the table "Population statistic" and in the sections "Ethnicity" & "Religion" is caused by the use of various statistical methods.

=== Religion ===
Census 2021 (1+ %)
Religion	Number	Fraction
Roman Catholic Church	3047	51.29%
None	1985	33.41%
Not found out	320	5.39%
Evangelical Church	306	5.15%
Total	5941	

In year 2021 was 5941 people by religion 3047 from Roman Catholic Church, 1985 from None, 320 from Not found out, 306 from Evangelical Church, 49 from Other, 46 from Greek Catholic Church, 37 from Church of the Brethren, 28 from Ad hoc movements, 18 from Other and not ascertained christian church, 18 from Christian Congregations in Slovakia, 16 from Eastern Orthodox Church, 16 from Apostolic Church, 12 from Buddhism, 9 from Calvinist Church, 8 from Paganism and natural spirituality, 5 from Jewish community, 5 from Islam, 5 from Baptists Church, 3 from Jehovah's Witnesses, 3 from United Methodist Church, 3 from Seventh-day Adventist Church, 1 from Church of Jesus Christ of Latter-day Saints and 1 from Bahá'i Community.

== Landmarks ==
The most remarkable historical monument is the Gothic church of St. George, built in the 13th century. The sandstone altar from 1527 is an example of a transition between the Gothic and Renaissance styles. The stained glass windows were designed by Janko Alexy in 1950. The wooden bell tower from the 17th century protects a bell from 1400. The bell cracked due to a fire in 1802 and after repair in 1848 was damaged again. There is a fame that this bell was buried during the period of the Ottoman raids and was accidentally found by a rooting pig afterwards.

A Great Moravian castle was built in the 9th century and it was abandoned in the 14th century. 1,693 metres of the walls have been preserved, but their height is now lower than the original 10 metres.

Other places of interest include a Renaissance manor house, a Baroque church of Trinity, a Piarist monastery from 1720, a late 18th century synagogue and the ruins of the city walls.

Svätý Jur is also well known for the largest raceway in Slovakia.

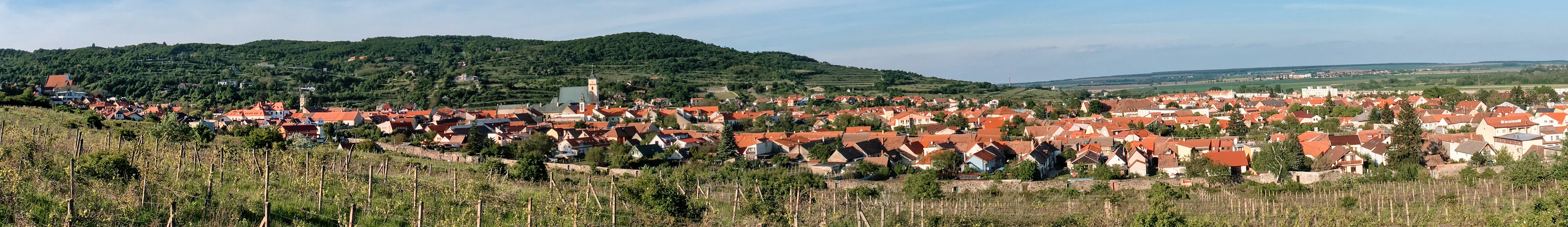
A panoramatic view of Svätý Jur

== Biely Kameň Castle ==
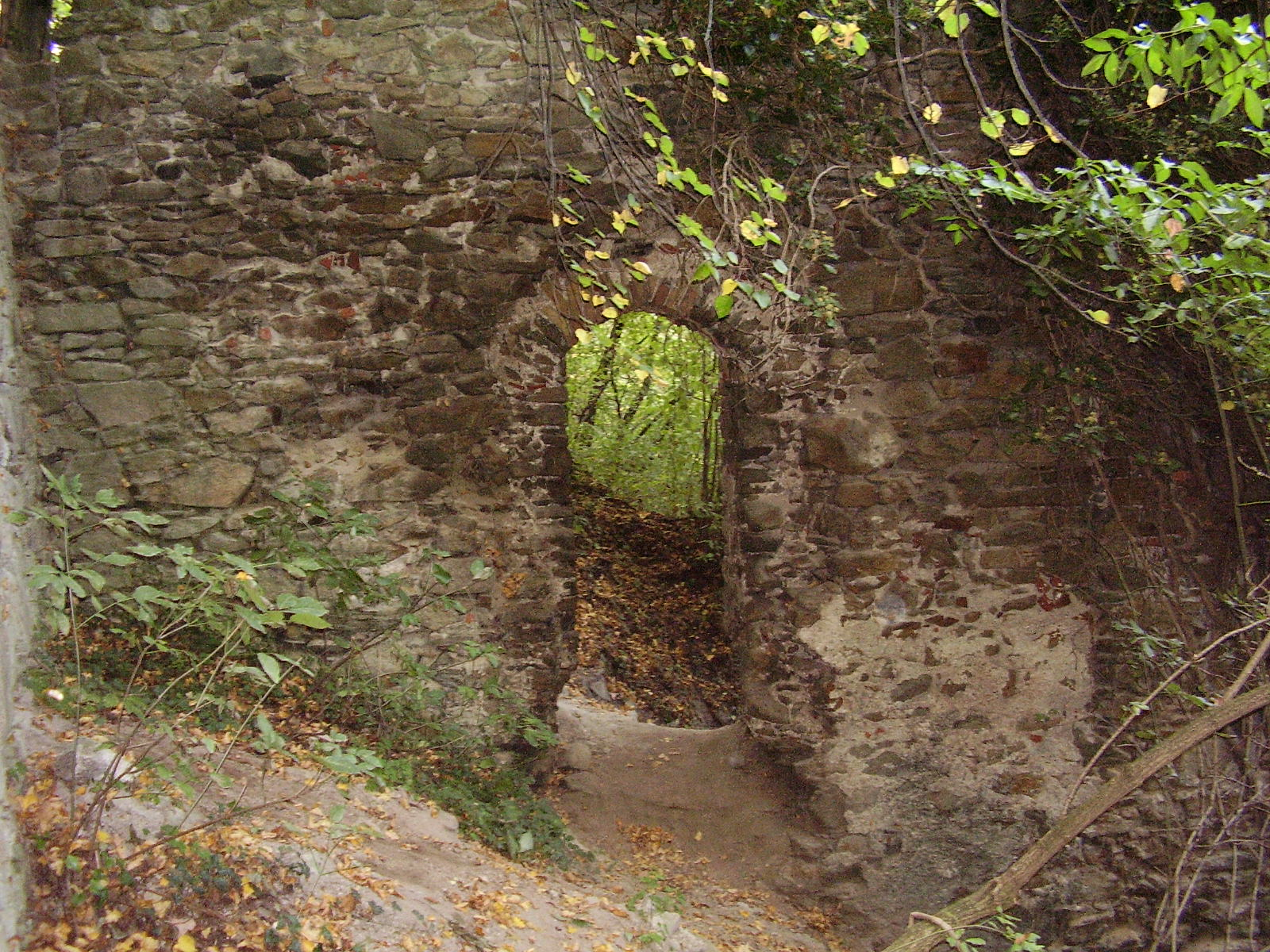
Ruins of Biely Kameň Castle

The castle of Biely Kameň was mentioned for the first time in 1217.

It was the seat of the counts of Svätý Jur until 1609, when they moved to a more comfortable manor house in the town. The castle was partially destroyed by an Ottoman raid in 1663.

The ruins are still visible.

== Population ==
In 2006, Svätý Jur had a population of 5,186. According to the 2001 census, 97.5% of inhabitants were Slovaks. The Roman Catholicism is the most popular religion (72.5%), but there is also a significant number of atheists (15.9%) living in the village.

== Sport ==
The town has an association football team called ŠK Svätý Jur.

== Notable people ==
- Alojz Hudek (1887 – 1961), SDB, Roman Catholic priest end Missionary (Bolivia, Peru)
- Karl Samuel Grünhut (1844–1929), Austrian jurist
- Dr Imrich Sarkany FRCP, Consultant Dermatologist, Royal Free Hospital, London

== Twin towns – sister cities ==
Svätý Jur is twinned with:

- Bělá pod Bezdězem, Czech Republic
