= Ľubotice =

Village and municipality in Slovakia

- Municipality
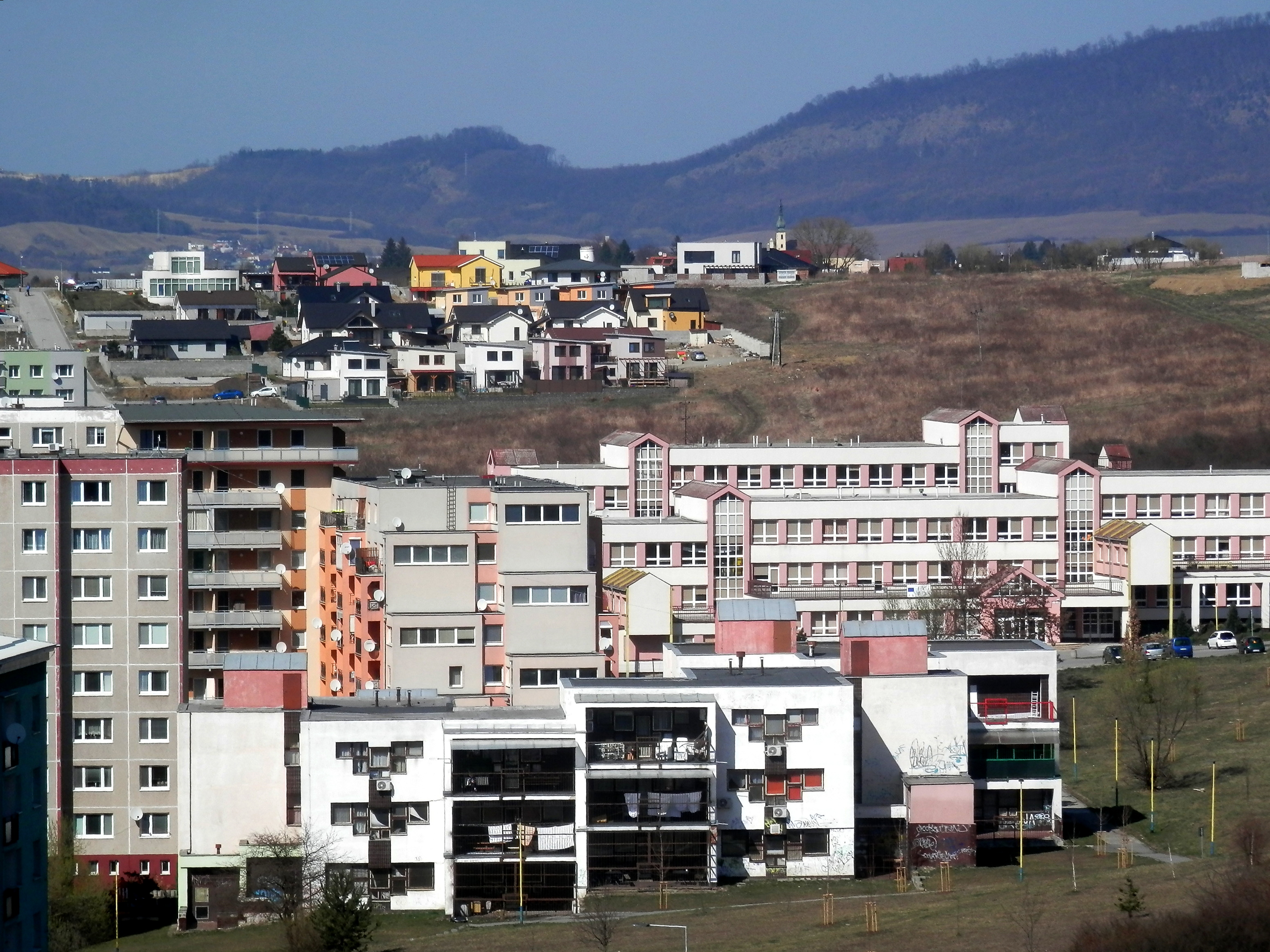

- Flag

- Location of Ľubotice in the Prešov Region Location of Ľubotice in Slovakia
- Coordinates: 49.02°N 21.28°E
- Country: Slovakia
- Region: Prešov Region
- District: Prešov District
- First mentioned: 1285

Area
  - Total: 8.30 km^{2} (3.20 sq mi)
- Elevation: 258 m (846 ft)

Population (2025)
  - Total: 4,134
- Time zone: UTC+1 (CET)
  - Summer (DST): UTC+2 (CEST)
- Postal code: 800 6
- Area code: +421 51
- Vehicle registration plate (until 2022): PO
- Website: www.obeclubotice.sk

Ľubotice is a village and municipality in Prešov District in the Prešov Region of eastern Slovakia.

== History ==
In historical records the village was first mentioned in 1285.

== Geography ==
The municipality lies at an altitude of 258 metres (846 ft) and covers an area of 8.30 km^{2} (3.20 sq mi) (2025).

== Population ==
Population statistic (10 years)
Year	1995	2005	2015	2025
Count	2231	2852	3240	4134
Difference		+27.83%	+13.60%	+27.59%

Population statistic
Year	2024	2025
Count	4103	4134
Difference		+0.75%

It has a population of 4134 people (31 December 2025).

=== Ethnicity ===
Census 2021 (1+ %)
Ethnicity	Number	Fraction
Slovak	3397	93.37%
Not found out	184	5.05%
Rusyn	108	2.96%
Total	3638	

In year 2021 was 3638 people by ethnicity 3397 as Slovak, 184 as Not found out, 108 as Rusyn, 18 as Ukrainian, 13 as Other, 10 as Czech, 6 as Hungarian, 5 as Italian, 3 as Chinese, 3 as German, 2 as Irish, 2 as English, 1 as Jewish, 1 as Romani, 1 as Russian, 1 as Polish, 1 as Moravian, 1 as Canadian, 1 as Greek and 1 as Albanian.

Note on population: The difference values of population numbers in the table "Population statistic" and in the sections "Ethnicity" & "Religion" is caused by the use of various statistical methods.

=== Religion ===
Census 2021 (1+ %)
Religion	Number	Fraction
Roman Catholic Church	2509	68.97%
None	458	12.59%
Greek Catholic Church	281	7.72%
Not found out	202	5.55%
Evangelical Church	78	2.14%
Eastern Orthodox Church	57	1.57%
Total	3638	

In year 2021 was 3638 people by religion 2509 from Roman Catholic Church, 458 from None, 281 from Greek Catholic Church, 202 from Not found out, 78 from Evangelical Church, 57 from Eastern Orthodox Church, 13 from Ad hoc movements, 12 from Church of the Brethren, 8 from Other, 5 from Islam, 4 from Paganism and natural spirituality, 3 from Jehovah's Witnesses, 3 from Christian Congregations in Slovakia, 1 from Jewish community, 1 from Other and not ascertained christian church, 1 from New Apostolic Church, 1 from Buddhism and 1 from Apostolic Church.
