= Ezrat nashim =

Women's section of a synagogue

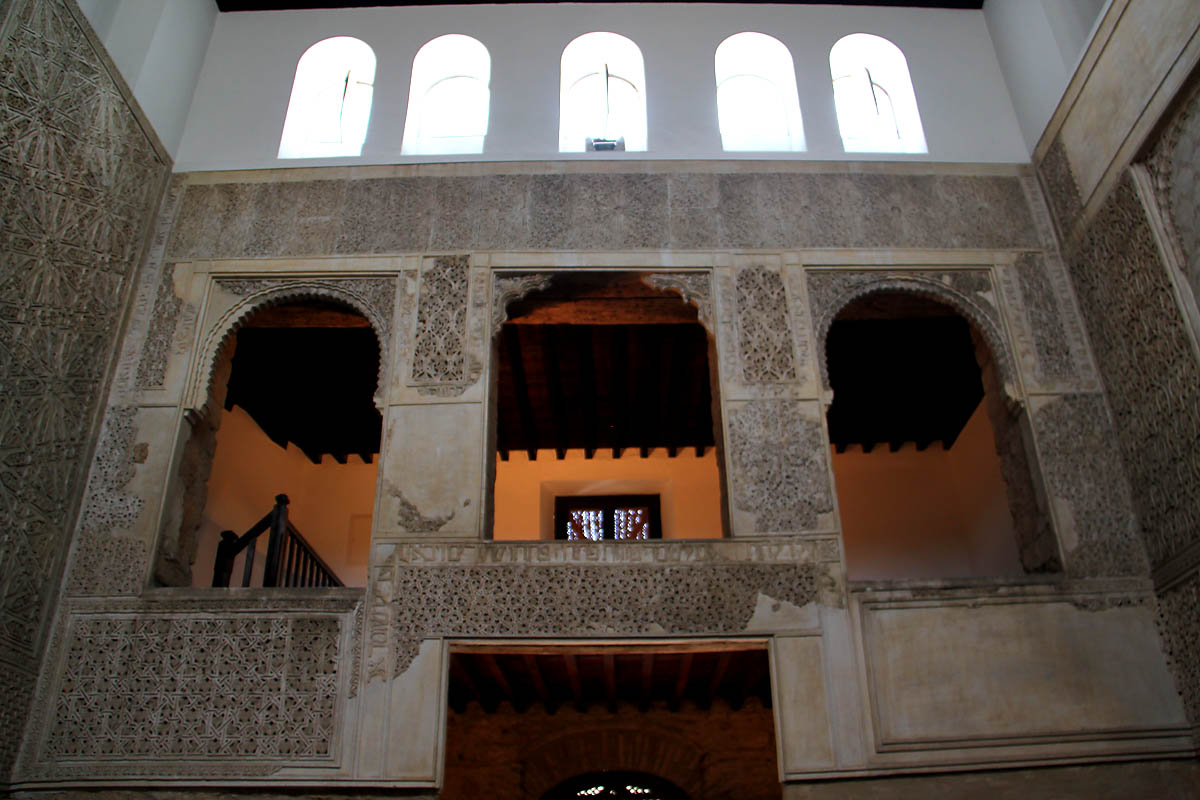
Women's gallery in the 14th-century Córdoba Synagogue.

An ezrat nashim (plural ezrot nashim; Hebrew: עזרת נשים, romanized: ʿezraṯ nāšim) or vaybershul (Yiddish: ווײַבערשול), commonly referred to in English as a women's section or women's gallery, is an area of a synagogue sanctuary reserved exclusively for women in Judaism.

Scholars have long debated the existence of ezrot nashim in synagogues in Synagogal Judaism and subsequently in Rabbinic Judaism during the Second Temple period and the subsequent Rabbinic period. Shmuel Safrai, through a combination of textual analysis and archaeological evidence, has argued that while women consistently attended synagogue services, there is no definitive evidence to support the existence of a mechitza (partition separating the genders) or the existence of an ezrat nashim. Archaeologist Lee I. Levine agrees with Safrai that not only is there no archaeological evidence for the existence of ezrot nashim in ancient synagogues in Palestine, but there are also many that have only a single prayer hall, indicating that there was no segregation at all.

Ezrot nashim could be separate annexes, as seen in synagogues like the Old New Synagogue of Prague and the Worms Synagogue, or elevated galleries within the synagogue sanctuary. If the latter, it is typically located on the west side of the building. However, variations exist, with some galleries positioned on the north or south sides of the building. In larger synagogues, it is common to find two galleries, one above the other.

In the mid-19th century, Reform synagogues in Germany and Austria introduced separate pews for men and women on the same floor. Later, Reform congregations in the United States introduced "family seating", whereby congregants sit together irrespective of gender. Many Orthodox synagogues built in the 20th and 21st centuries do not have a separate ezrat nashim; instead, they partition a single floor into men's and women's sections with a mechitza.

== See also ==
- Gender separation in Judaism
- Islam and gender segregation § In mosques
- Triforium § Matroneum
