= Breg, Sevnica =

Breg
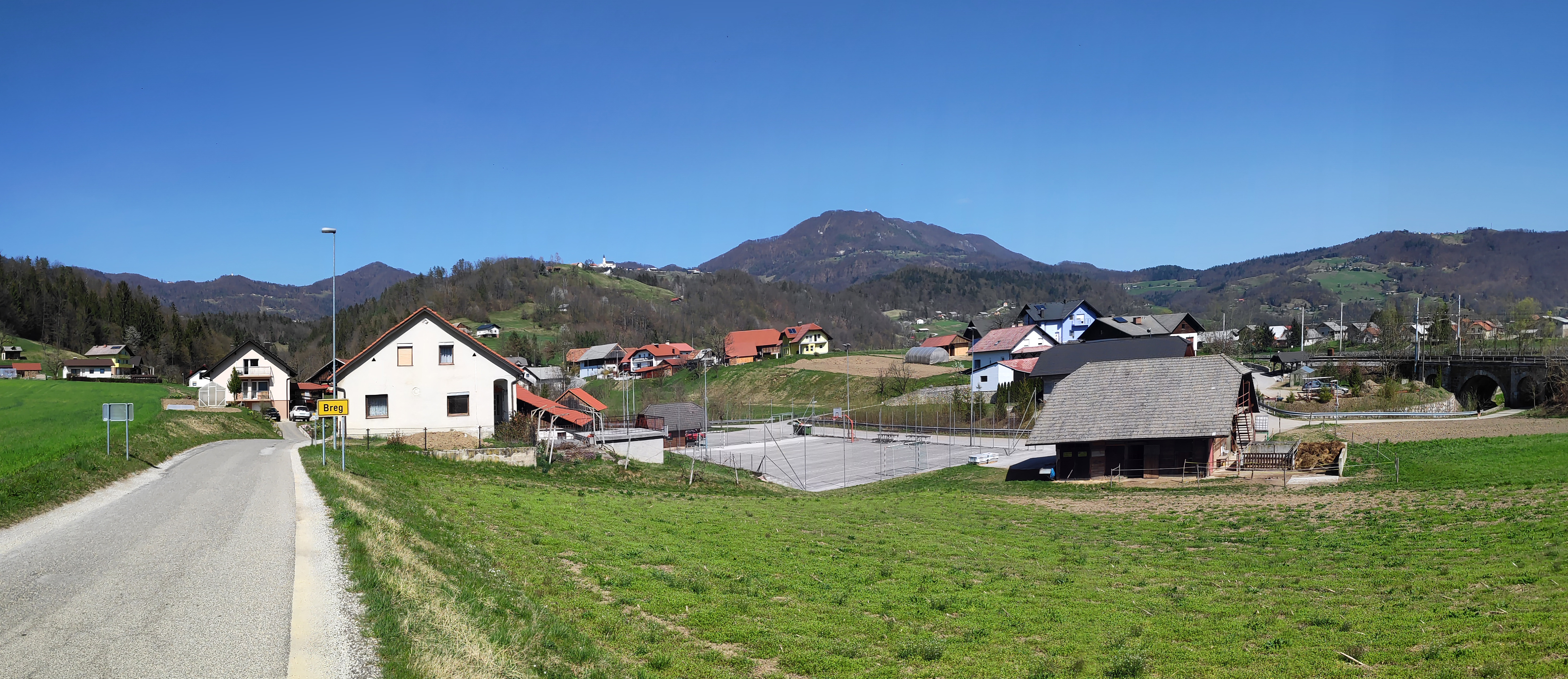

- Location in Slovenia
- Coordinates: 46°2′41″N 15°14′33.56″E
- Country: Slovenia
- Traditional region: Styria
- Statistical region: Lower Sava
- Municipality: Sevnica

Area
  - Total: 2.43 km^{2} (0.94 sq mi)
- Elevation: 189.7 m (622 ft)

Population (2002)
  - Total: 157

Breg (pronounced [ˈbɾeːk]) is a settlement on the left bank of the Sava River in the Municipality of Sevnica in central Slovenia. The area is part of the historical region of Styria. The municipality is now included in the Lower Sava Statistical Region. The settlement includes the hamlets of Gradišče, Jelše, and Zagradec.

== Name ==
Breg is not only a common toponym in Slovenia, but also has equivalents in other Slavic languages (e.g., Brijeg in Bosnia and Herzegovina, Břehy in the Czech Republic, Brehy in Slovakia, and Brzeg in Poland), all derived from the Slavic common noun *bergъ 'slope, bank'. In Slovene, the noun breg may refer not only to sloping land or land alongside a body of water, but also to the water itself.

== History ==
The remains of a prehistoric fortress above the settlement, where worked stone artifacts have been found, attest to early settlement in the area. Before the second railroad track was built between Sevnica and Zidani Most, Breg was an important passing loop before the station in Zidani Most; now it serves as a classification yard. A fire station was built in Breg in 1958, and water mains were installed in 1971.

=== Mass graves ===
Breg is the site of three known mass graves from the end of the Second World War. They all contain the remains of Ustaša soldiers. The Breg 1 Mass Grave (Slovene: Grobišče Breg 1) lies in the yard of the house at Breg no. 1e. It contains the remains of nine victims. The Breg 2 Mass Grave (Grobišče Breg 2) is located in a meadow in the middle of the settlement, about 40 m from the road. It contains the remains of two victims. The Breg 3 Mass Grave (Grobišče Breg 3) lies on the bank of the Sava River near the house at Breg no. 12. It contains the remains of three victims.

== Transport ==
- Breg railway station
