= Marianna Grznárová =

Slovak writer (1941–2025)

- Born: 1 December 1941; Rudno nad Hronom, First Slovak Republic
- Died: 23 March 2025 (aged 83); Bratislava, Slovakia
- Education: Constantine the Philosopher University in Nitra
- Occupations: Writer, dramaturge
- Children: 1
- Writing career
- Language: Slovak

Marianna Grznárová (1 December 1941 – 23 March 2025) was a Slovak poet, prose writer, dramaturge and author of literature for children and youth.

== Early life and education ==
Marianna Grznárová was born in the village of Rudno nad Hronom in the Žarnovica District. Her father was a policeman while her mother worked as a teacher. She had four siblings.

She studied pedagogy at the Constantine the Philosopher University in Nitra.

== Career ==
Subsequent to her studies, she worked as a teacher and editor. From 1972 to 1984, she was employed as a dramaturge at Czechoslovak Television in Bratislava. After 1984, she worked as a freelance writer.

She made her literary debut in 1966 with the poetry collection Vstupujte bosí. Her works include several children’s books such as Bosá jabloň, O netopierovi, ktorý nechcel spávať, and the puppet play Hašterica. Her most recognizable book for children is Maťko a Kubko. In addition to prose and poetry, she wrote television scripts and translated children’s literature from Czech. Her writing often incorporated humor and educational elements, with a focus on character and moral development. In the 2000s, she returned to adult literature with the poetry collection Balóny pani Barusovej.

== Personal life and death ==
Grznárová was married and had one daughter named Karin. In 1985, her daughter emigrated to France, leaving behind her six months son who was then raised by Grznárová. In her final years, Grznárová lived in the Dúbravka burough of Bratislava together with her grandson. Grznárová died on 23 March 2025 at the age of 83.
