= Břehy =

Břehy or Brehy is the name of several places:

- Břehy (Pardubice District), a municipality and village in the Czech Republic
- Brehy, Žarnovica District, a municipality and village in southern Slovakia
