= Tekovská Breznica =

Tekovská Breznica Barsberzence
- Municipality
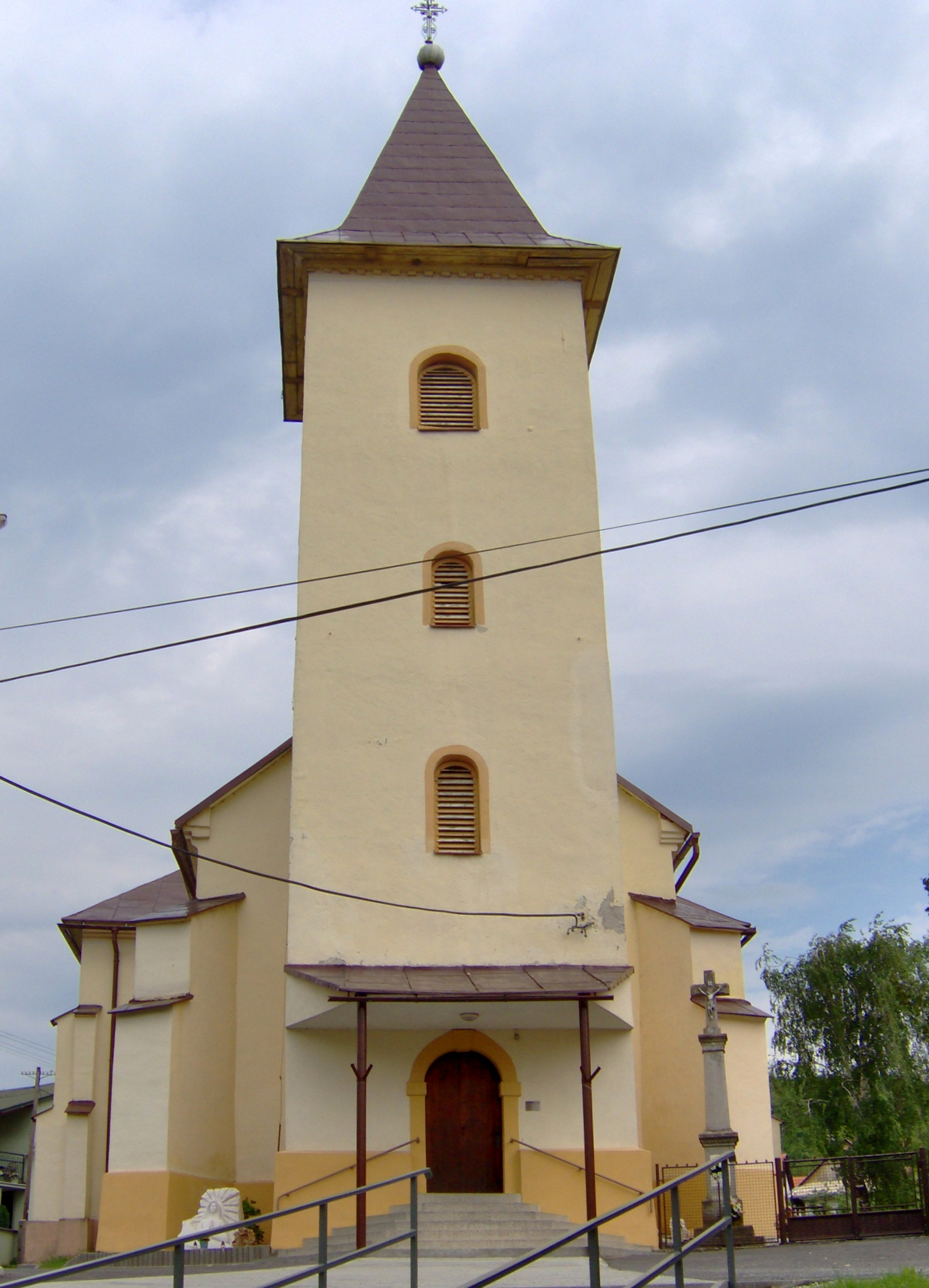

- Flag Coat of arms

- Location of Tekovská Breznica in the Banská Bystrica Region Location of Tekovská Breznica in Slovakia
- Coordinates: 48.38°N 18.62°E
- Country: Slovakia
- Region: Banská Bystrica Region
- District: Žarnovica District
- First mentioned: 1276

Area
  - Total: 29.83 km^{2} (11.52 sq mi)
- Elevation: 197 m (646 ft)

Population (2025)
  - Total: 1,208
- Time zone: UTC+1 (CET)
  - Summer (DST): UTC+2 (CEST)
- Postal code: 966 52
- Area code: +421 45
- Vehicle registration plate (until 2022): ZC
- Website: www.tekovskabreznica.sk

Tekovská Breznica (German: Bresnitz an der Gran, Hungarian: Barsberzence) is a municipality in the Žarnovica District, Banská Bystrica Region in Slovakia.

== Geography ==
The municipality lies at an altitude of 197 metres (646 ft) and covers an area of 29.83 km^{2} (11.52 sq mi) (2025).

== Location ==
The village is 5 km south of Nová Baňa and about 15 km south of Žarnovica.

== History ==
It was first mentioned in 1276 when the Benedictine Abbey of Hronský Beňadik protested against the Archbishopric of Esztergom occupying the property of the Abbey in the Breznica border.

The castle was built by the archbishop of Esztergom in the late 13th century. Matthew III Csák took it by digging a tunnel under the castle walls. After the death of Matthew Csák in 1321, it was again the property of the archbishop. It was recruited in the 15th century. After the unsuccessful conspiracy of the archbishop János Vitéz against King Matthias Corvinus in 1472 it was taken by the king.

In 1564 the village belonged to the Revište dominium owned by the Dóczy family. In 1568 it was devastated by the Ottoman troops. Aga Mustafa, the Ottoman governor of Esztergom, devastated again the village in 1647, when a lot of inhabitants was slaughtered, others were dragged by Ottomans.

In 1720, 44 taxpayers lived in the settlement. In 1768 there were 63 peasant houses, 11 cotter huts and 2 noble mansions in Tekovská Breznica. In 1766 the Banská Bystrica Bishopric was the landowner in the village. In 1828 there were 136 houses and 788 inhabitants. In 1910 there were 1177 mainly Slovak inhabitants.

Until the Treaty of Trianon in 1920, the village belonged to the Aranyosmarót district of Bars county of the Kingdom of Hungary.

== Population ==
Population statistic (10 years)
Year	1995	2005	2015	2025
Count	1339	1285	1226	1208
Difference		−4.03%	−4.59%	−1.46%

Population statistic
Year	2024	2025
Count	1201	1208
Difference		+0.58%

It has a population of 1208 people (31 December 2025).

=== Ethnicity ===
Census 2021 (1+ %)
Ethnicity	Number	Fraction
Slovak	1176	96.94%
Not found out	21	1.73%
Total	1213	

In year 2021 was 1213 people by ethnicity 1176 as Slovak, 21 as Not found out, 11 as Czech, 6 as Ukrainian, 4 as Hungarian, 3 as Other, 3 as English, 2 as Polish, 1 as Jewish, 1 as Vietnamese, 1 as Rusyn, 1 as Russian, 1 as Romanian, 1 as Austrian and 1 as French.

Note on population: The difference values of population numbers in the table "Population statistic" and in the sections "Ethnicity" & "Religion" is caused by the use of various statistical methods.

=== Religion ===
Census 2021 (1+ %)
Religion	Number	Fraction
Roman Catholic Church	993	81.86%
None	139	11.46%
Not found out	20	1.65%
Evangelical Church	15	1.24%
Total	1213	

In year 2021 was 1213 people by religion 993 from Roman Catholic Church, 139 from None, 20 from Not found out, 15 from Evangelical Church, 12 from Greek Catholic Church, 9 from Eastern Orthodox Church, 5 from Czechoslovak Hussite Church, 4 from Other, 4 from Baptists Church, 3 from Paganism and natural spirituality, 3 from Buddhism, 2 from Ad hoc movements, 1 from Other and not ascertained christian church, 1 from Christian Congregations in Slovakia, 1 from Islam and 1 from Hinduism.

== Sights ==
- Scarce ruins of castle Breznica on the top of the 445 m high hill by the village
- Virgin Mary Roman Catholic church built in 1734, transformed into Baroque style in 1777, recruited and improved in 1913
