= Píla, Žarnovica District =

Píla Dóczyfürésze
- Municipality
- Flag

- Location of Píla in the Banská Bystrica Region Location of Píla in Slovakia
- Coordinates: 48.53°N 18.61°E
- Country: Slovakia
- Region: Banská Bystrica Region
- District: Žarnovica District
- First mentioned: 1534

Area
  - Total: 25.79 km^{2} (9.96 sq mi)
- Elevation: 380 m (1,250 ft)

Population (2025)
  - Total: 131
- Time zone: UTC+1 (CET)
  - Summer (DST): UTC+2 (CEST)
- Postal code: 966 81
- Area code: +421 45
- Vehicle registration plate (until 2022): ZC
- Website: www.obecpila.eu

Píla (1920–1927: Tekovská Píla; German: Paulisch or Polisch; Hungarian: Dóczyfürésze, until 1890: Pila) is a village and municipality in the Žarnovica District, Banská Bystrica Region in Slovakia. The village belonged to a German language island. The German population was expelled in 1945.

== Population ==
Population statistic (10 years)
| Year | 1995 | 2005 | 2015 | 2025 |
|---|---|---|---|---|
| Count | 174 | 147 | 136 | 131 |
| Difference | | −15.51% | −7.48% | −3.67% |

Population statistic
| Year | 2024 | 2025 |
|---|---|---|
| Count | 130 | 131 |
| Difference | | +0.76% |

It has a population of 131 people (31 December 2025).

=== Ethnicity ===
Census 2021 (1+ %)
| Ethnicity | Number | Fraction |
|---|---|---|
| Slovak | 122 | 97.6% |
| Romani | 14 | 11.2% |
| Not found out | 2 | 1.6% |
| Total | 125 | |

In year 2021 was 125 people by ethnicity 122 as Slovak, 14 as Romani, 2 as Not found out, 1 as Russian, 1 as German and 1 as Hungarian.

Note on population: The difference values of population numbers in the table "Population statistic" and in the sections "Ethnicity" & "Religion" is caused by the use of various statistical methods.

=== Religion ===
Census 2021 (1+ %)
| Religion | Number | Fraction |
|---|---|---|
| Roman Catholic Church | 87 | 69.6% |
| None | 21 | 16.8% |
| Christian Congregations in Slovakia | 9 | 7.2% |
| Church of the Brethren | 3 | 2.4% |
| Not found out | 2 | 1.6% |
| Total | 125 | |

In year 2021 was 125 people by religion 87 from Roman Catholic Church, 21 from None, 9 from Christian Congregations in Slovakia, 3 from Church of the Brethren, 2 from Not found out, 1 from Other and not ascertained christian church, 1 from Buddhism and 1 from Ad hoc movements.
