= Kľak =

Kľak Madarasalja
- Municipality
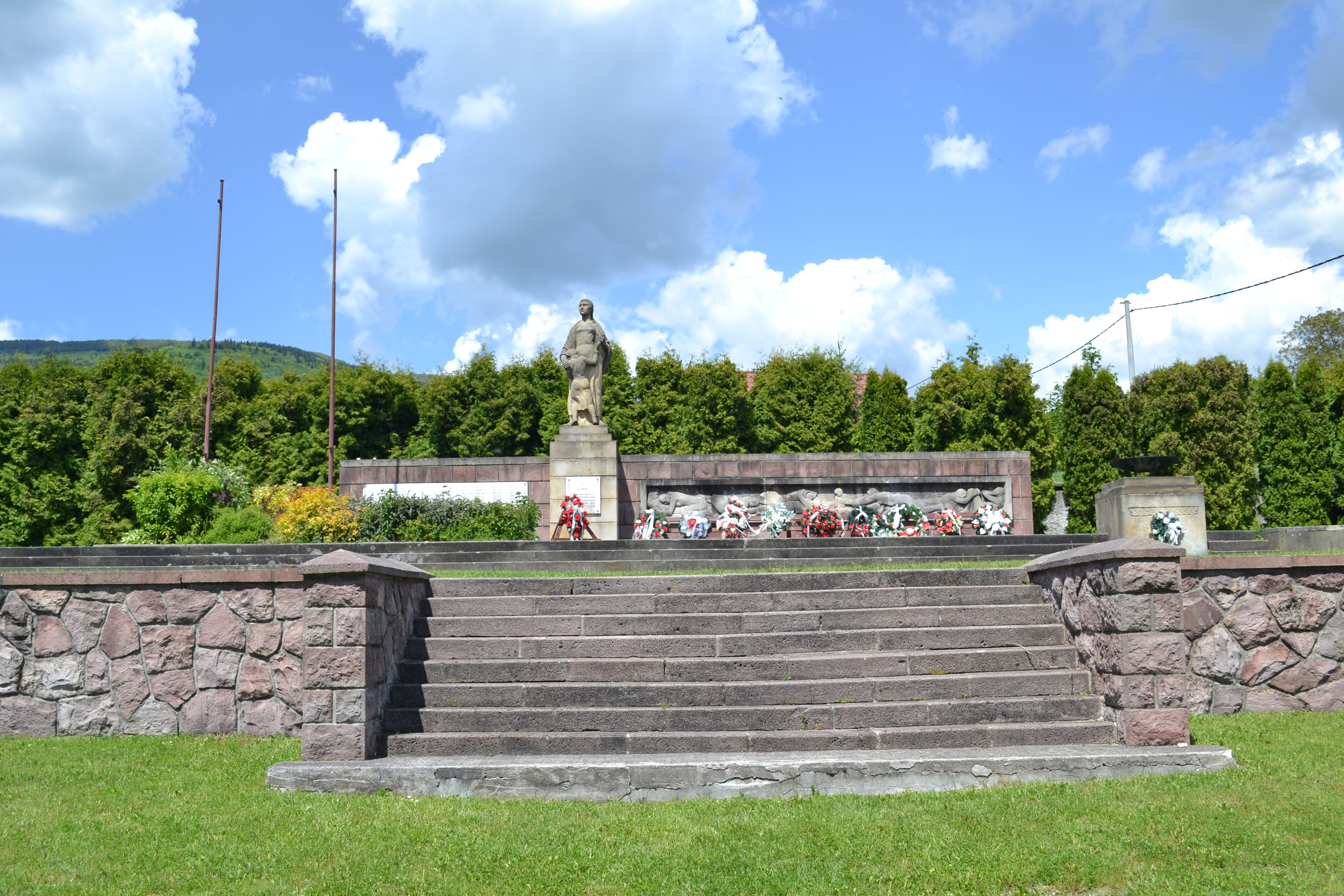

- Flag

- Location of Kľak in the Banská Bystrica Region Location of Kľak in Slovakia
- Coordinates: 48.58°N 18.65°E
- Country: Slovakia
- Region: Banská Bystrica Region
- District: Žarnovica District
- First mentioned: 1828

Area
  - Total: 22.79 km^{2} (8.80 sq mi)
- Elevation: 616 m (2,021 ft)

Population (2025)
  - Total: 165
- Time zone: UTC+1 (CET)
  - Summer (DST): UTC+2 (CEST)
- Postal code: 966 77
- Area code: +421 45
- Vehicle registration plate (until 2022): ZC
- Website: www.klak.sk

Kľak (Hungarian: Madarasalja) is a village and municipality in the Žarnovica District, Banská Bystrica Region in Slovakia.

== Geography ==
The municipality lies at an altitude of 616 metres (2,021 ft) and covers an area of 22.79 km^{2} (8.80 sq mi) (2025).

== History ==
On January 21, 1945 the village was burned by Waffen-SS anti-partisan unit Edelweiss with help of Heimatschutz unit. There were 84 inhabitants of the village killed (including 36 children), and all of 132 houses and buildings were destroyed. Numerous victims were burned alive in their own houses. Nazi soldiers raided the village and expelled the rest of the inhabitants from the village, they also shot all of the cattle. Considering the method of accomplishment, not the number of casualties, this was one of the most brutal war crimes committed on the Slovak territory during World War II.

== Population ==
Population statistic (10 years)
Year	1995	2005	2015	2025
Count	246	236	208	165
Difference		−4.06%	−11.86%	−20.67%

Population statistic
Year	2024	2025
Count	168	165
Difference		−1.78%

It has a population of 165 people (31 December 2025).

=== Ethnicity ===
Census 2021 (1+ %)
Ethnicity	Number	Fraction
Slovak	176	97.77%
Not found out	3	1.66%
Other	3	1.66%
Czech	2	1.11%
Total	180	

In year 2021 was 180 people by ethnicity 176 as Slovak, 3 as Not found out, 3 as Other and 2 as Czech.

Note on population: The difference values of population numbers in the table "Population statistic" and in the sections "Ethnicity" & "Religion" is caused by the use of various statistical methods.

=== Religion ===
Census 2021 (1+ %)
Religion	Number	Fraction
Roman Catholic Church	142	78.89%
None	32	17.78%
Not found out	4	2.22%
Total	180	

In year 2021 was 180 people by religion 142 from Roman Catholic Church, 32 from None, 4 from Not found out, 1 from Other and not ascertained christian church and 1 from Christian Congregations in Slovakia.
