= Veľká Lehota =

Village and municipality in Slovakia

Veľká Lehota Nagyülés
- Municipality
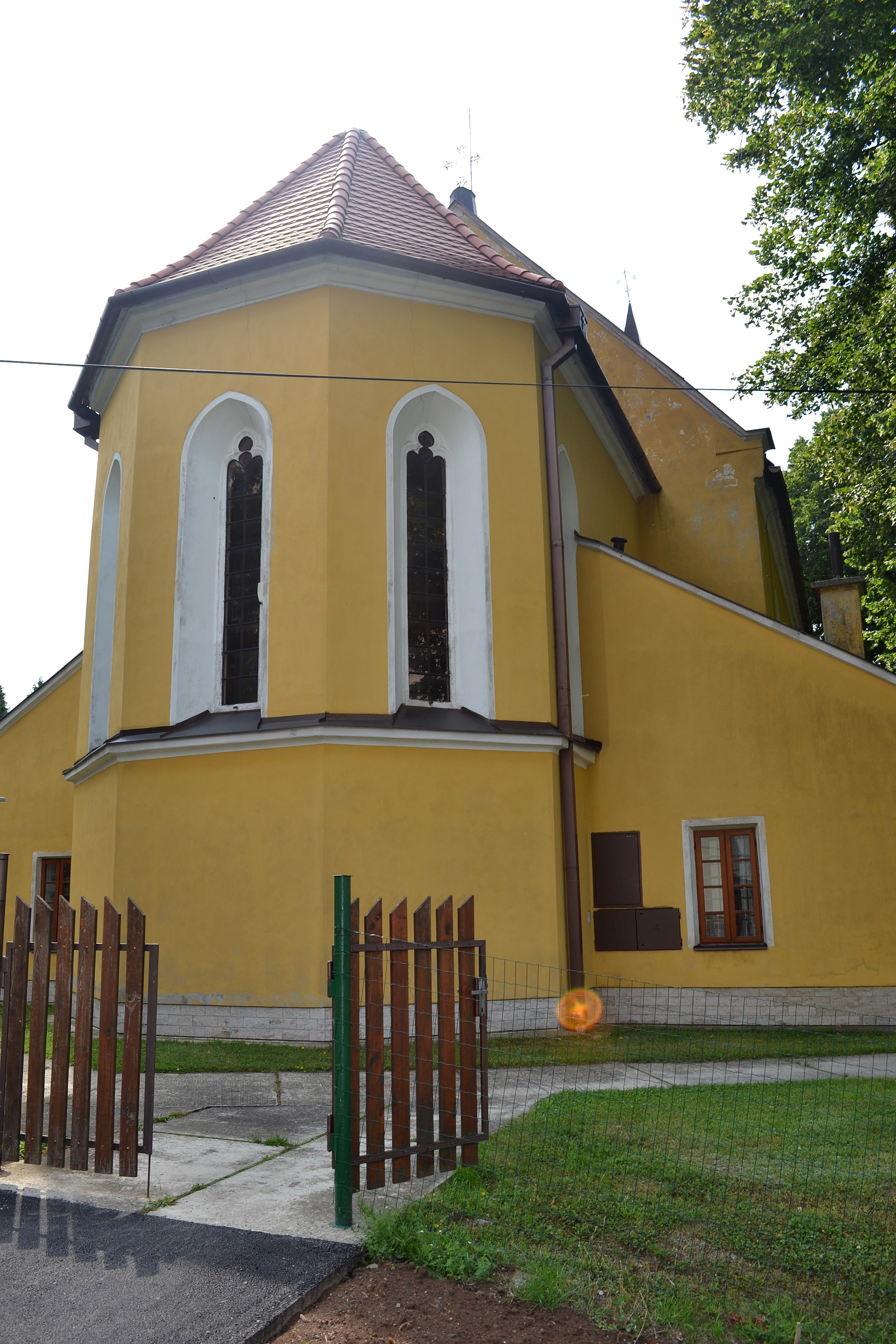
- Church of Saint Martin

- Flag

- Location of Veľká Lehota in the Banská Bystrica Region Location of Veľká Lehota in Slovakia
- Coordinates: 48.46°N 18.56°E
- Country: Slovakia
- Region: Banská Bystrica Region
- District: Žarnovica District
- First mentioned: 1355

Area
  - Total: 18.61 km^{2} (7.19 sq mi)
- Elevation: 564 m (1,850 ft)

Population (2025)
  - Total: 996
- Time zone: UTC+1 (CET)
  - Summer (DST): UTC+2 (CEST)
- Postal code: 966 41
- Area code: +421 45
- Vehicle registration plate (until 2022): ZC
- Website: www.velkalehota.eu

Veľká Lehota (Hungarian: Nagyülés) is a village and municipality in the Žarnovica District, Banská Bystrica Region in Slovakia.

== Geography ==
The municipality lies at an altitude of 564 metres (1,850 ft) and covers an area of 18.61 km^{2} (7.19 sq mi) (2025).

== Population ==
Population statistic (10 years)
Year	1995	2005	2015	2025
Count	1304	1244	1103	996
Difference		−4.60%	−11.33%	−9.70%

Population statistic
Year	2024	2025
Count	1009	996
Difference		−1.28%

It has a population of 996 people (31 December 2025).

=== Ethnicity ===
Census 2021 (1+ %)
Ethnicity	Number	Fraction
Slovak	1044	97.66%
Not found out	18	1.68%
Total	1069	

In year 2021 was 1069 people by ethnicity 1044 as Slovak, 18 as Not found out, 6 as Czech, 5 as Romani, 5 as Other, 3 as Hungarian, 2 as Russian, 1 as Jewish, 1 as German and 1 as French.

Note on population: The difference values of population numbers in the table "Population statistic" and in the sections "Ethnicity" & "Religion" is caused by the use of various statistical methods.

=== Religion ===
Census 2021 (1+ %)
Religion	Number	Fraction
Roman Catholic Church	935	87.46%
None	79	7.39%
Not found out	27	2.53%
Total	1069	

In year 2021 was 1069 people by religion 935 from Roman Catholic Church, 79 from None, 27 from Not found out, 10 from Christian Congregations in Slovakia, 10 from Greek Catholic Church, 5 from Evangelical Church, 2 from Other and not ascertained christian church and 1 from Ad hoc movements.
