= Malá Lehota =

Malá Lehota Kisülés
- Municipality
- Flag

- Location of Malá Lehota in the Banská Bystrica Region Location of Malá Lehota in Slovakia
- Coordinates: 48.50°N 18.57°E
- Country: Slovakia
- Region: Banská Bystrica Region
- District: Žarnovica District
- First mentioned: 1388

Area
  - Total: 22.83 km^{2} (8.81 sq mi)
- Elevation: 596 m (1,955 ft)

Population (2025)
  - Total: 785
- Time zone: UTC+1 (CET)
  - Summer (DST): UTC+2 (CEST)
- Postal code: 966 42
- Area code: +421 45
- Vehicle registration plate (until 2022): ZC
- Website: www.malalehota.eu

Malá Lehota (Hungarian: Kisülés) is a village and municipality in the Žarnovica District, Banská Bystrica Region in Slovakia.

== Geography ==
The municipality lies at an altitude of 596 metres (1,955 ft) and covers an area of 22.83 km^{2} (8.81 sq mi) (2025).

== Population ==
Population statistic (10 years)
Year	1995	2005	2015	2025
Count	1133	1004	869	785
Difference		−11.38%	−13.44%	−9.66%

Population statistic
Year	2024	2025
Count	791	785
Difference		−0.75%

It has a population of 785 people (31 December 2025).

=== Ethnicity ===
Census 2021 (1+ %)
Ethnicity	Number	Fraction
Slovak	781	95.94%
Not found out	33	4.05%
Total	814	

In year 2021 was 814 people by ethnicity 781 as Slovak, 33 as Not found out, 4 as Other, 1 as Czech, 1 as Romani, 1 as Hungarian and 1 as Albanian.

Note on population: The difference values of population numbers in the table "Population statistic" and in the sections "Ethnicity" & "Religion" is caused by the use of various statistical methods.

=== Religion ===
Census 2021 (1+ %)
Religion	Number	Fraction
Roman Catholic Church	675	82.92%
None	66	8.11%
Not found out	28	3.44%
Christian Congregations in Slovakia	20	2.46%
Other and not ascertained christian church	12	1.47%
Total	814	

In year 2021 was 814 people by religion 675 from Roman Catholic Church, 66 from None, 28 from Not found out, 20 from Christian Congregations in Slovakia, 12 from Other and not ascertained christian church, 3 from Ad hoc movements, 2 from Paganism and natural spirituality, 2 from Greek Catholic Church, 2 from Evangelical Church, 1 from Islam, 1 from Other, 1 from Buddhism and 1 from Baptists Church.
