= Hrabičov =

Village and municipality in Slovakia

Hrabičov Gyertyánfa
- Municipality
- Flag

- Location of Hrabičov in the Banská Bystrica Region Location of Hrabičov in Slovakia
- Coordinates: 48.53°N 18.67°E
- Country: Slovakia
- Region: Banská Bystrica Region
- District: Žarnovica District
- First mentioned: 1828

Area
  - Total: 13.23 km^{2} (5.11 sq mi)
- Elevation: 358 m (1,175 ft)

Population (2025)
  - Total: 535
- Time zone: UTC+1 (CET)
  - Summer (DST): UTC+2 (CEST)
- Postal code: 966 78
- Area code: +421 45
- Vehicle registration plate (until 2022): ZC
- Website: www.hrabicov.sk

Hrabičov (Hungarian: Gyertyánfa) is a village and municipality in the Žarnovica District, Banská Bystrica Region in Slovakia.

== Geography ==
The municipality lies at an altitude of 358 metres (1,175 ft) and covers an area of 13.23 km^{2} (5.11 sq mi) (2025).

== Population ==
Population statistic (10 years)
Year	1995	2005	2015	2025
Count	607	625	585	535
Difference		+2.96%	−6.4%	−8.54%

Population statistic
Year	2024	2025
Count	548	535
Difference		−2.37%

It has a population of 535 people (31 December 2025).

=== Ethnicity ===
Census 2021 (1+ %)
Ethnicity	Number	Fraction
Slovak	552	97.18%
Not found out	11	1.93%
Total	568	

In year 2021 was 568 people by ethnicity 552 as Slovak, 11 as Not found out, 3 as Other, 2 as Czech, 2 as Russian, 2 as Polish, 2 as Hungarian and 1 as Bulgarian.

Note on population: The difference values of population numbers in the table "Population statistic" and in the sections "Ethnicity" & "Religion" is caused by the use of various statistical methods.

=== Religion ===
Census 2021 (1+ %)
Religion	Number	Fraction
Roman Catholic Church	448	78.87%
None	85	14.96%
Not found out	19	3.35%
Jehovah's Witnesses	9	1.58%
Total	568	

In year 2021 was 568 people by religion 448 from Roman Catholic Church, 85 from None, 19 from Not found out, 9 from Jehovah's Witnesses, 2 from Greek Catholic Church, 1 from Calvinist Church, 1 from Islam, 1 from Other, 1 from Baptists Church and 1 from Ad hoc movements.

== Genealogical resources ==
The records for genealogical research are available at the state archive "Statny Archiv in Banska Bystrica, Slovakia"

- Roman Catholic church records (births/marriages/deaths): 1784-1921 (parish B)

== See also ==
- List of municipalities and towns in Slovakia
