= Hodruša-Hámre =

Village and municipality in Slovakia

Hodruša-Hámre Hodrushámor
- Municipality
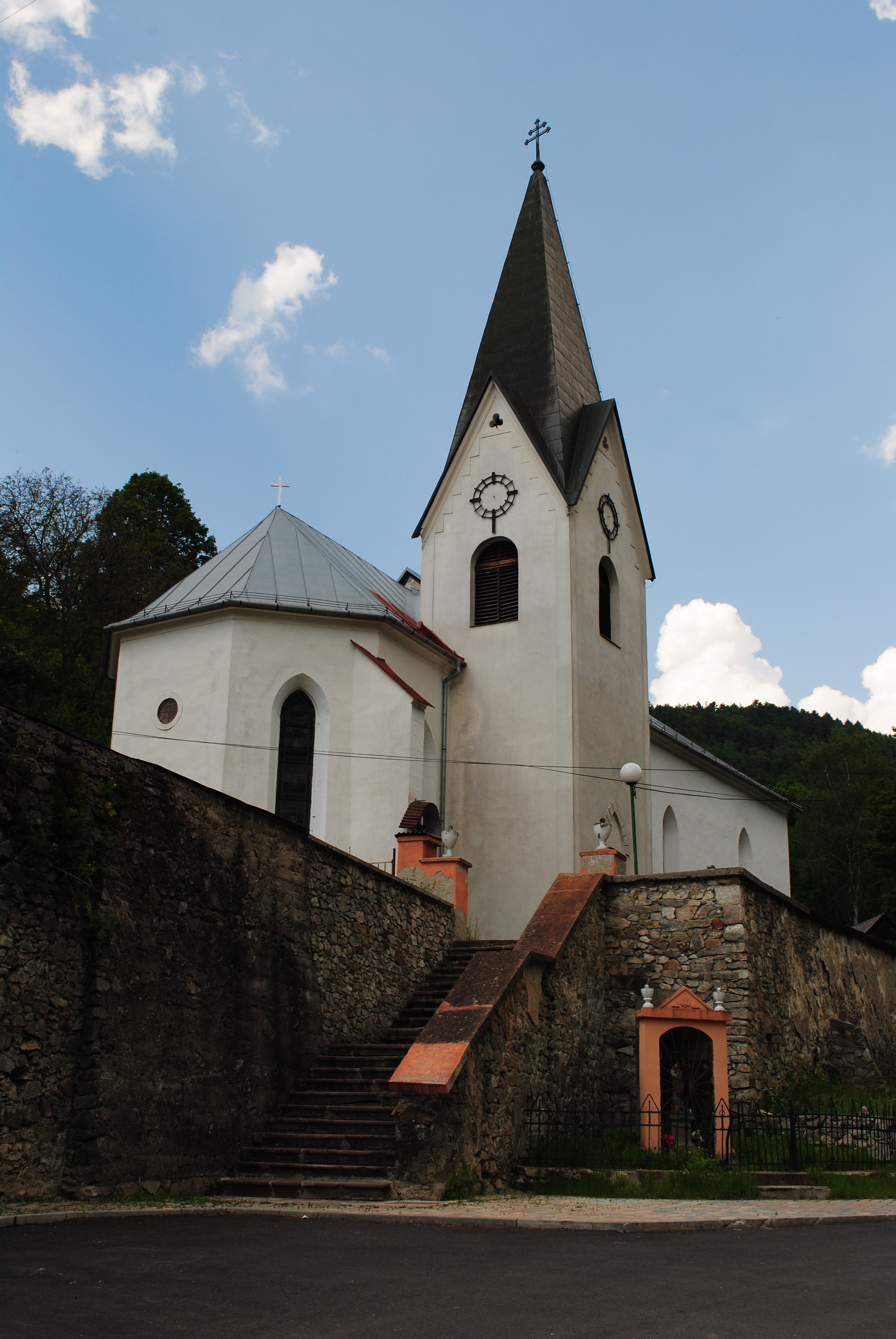

- Flag

- Location of Hodruša-Hámre in the Banská Bystrica Region Location of Hodruša-Hámre in Slovakia
- Coordinates: 48.46°N 18.75°E
- Country: Slovakia
- Region: Banská Bystrica Region
- District: Žarnovica District
- First mentioned: 1391

Area
  - Total: 46.17 km^{2} (17.83 sq mi)
- Elevation: 426 m (1,398 ft)

Population (2025)
  - Total: 1,989
- Time zone: UTC+1 (CET)
  - Summer (DST): UTC+2 (CEST)
- Postal code: 966 61
- Area code: +421 45
- Vehicle registration plate (until 2022): ZC
- Website: www.hodrusa-hamre.sk

Hodruša-Hámre (Hungarian: Hodrushámor) is a village and municipality in the Žarnovica District, Banská Bystrica Region in Slovakia.

== Geography ==
The municipality lies at an altitude of 426 metres (1,398 ft) and covers an area of 46.17 km^{2} (17.83 sq mi) (2025).

== Population ==
Population statistic (10 years)
Year	1995	2005	2015	2025
Count	2382	2275	2205	1989
Difference		−4.49%	−3.07%	−9.79%

Population statistic
Year	2024	2025
Count	1992	1989
Difference		−0.15%

It has a population of 1989 people (31 December 2025).

=== Ethnicity ===
Census 2021 (1+ %)
Ethnicity	Number	Fraction
Slovak	1928	92.87%
Not found out	145	6.98%
Romani	87	4.19%
Total	2076	

In year 2021 was 2076 people by ethnicity 1928 as Slovak, 145 as Not found out, 87 as Romani, 10 as Czech, 5 as Russian, 3 as German, 2 as Rusyn, 1 as Vietnamese, 1 as Turkish, 1 as Serbian, 1 as Polish, 1 as French, 1 as English and 1 as Albanian.

Note on population: The difference values of population numbers in the table "Population statistic" and in the sections "Ethnicity" & "Religion" is caused by the use of various statistical methods.

=== Religion ===
Census 2021 (1+ %)
Religion	Number	Fraction
Roman Catholic Church	1136	54.72%
None	645	31.07%
Not found out	138	6.65%
Evangelical Church	105	5.06%
Total	2076	

In year 2021 was 2076 people by religion 1136 from Roman Catholic Church, 645 from None, 138 from Not found out, 105 from Evangelical Church, 15 from Greek Catholic Church, 12 from Jehovah's Witnesses, 5 from Ad hoc movements, 4 from Eastern Orthodox Church, 4 from Christian Congregations in Slovakia, 4 from Other, 2 from Old Catholic Church, 2 from Other and not ascertained christian church, 1 from Calvinist Church, 1 from United Methodist Church, 1 from Buddhism and 1 from Baptists Church.

== Genealogical resources ==
The records for genealogical research are available at the state archive "Statny Archiv in Banska Bystrica, Slovakia"

== See also ==
- List of municipalities and towns in Slovakia
