= Breg railway station =

Railway station in Slovenia

Breg
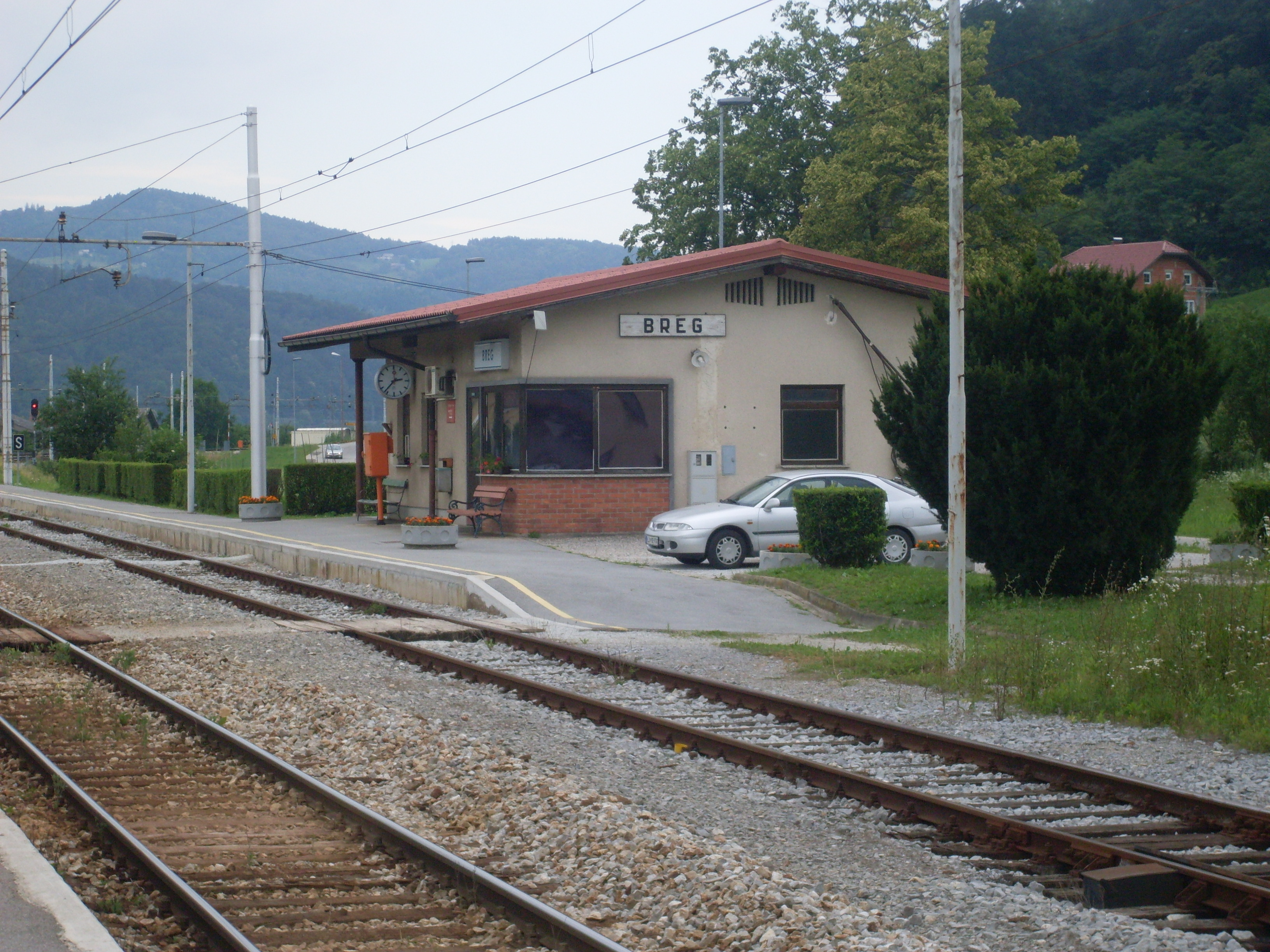

General information
- Location: 1434 Loka pri Zidanem mostu Slovenia
- Coordinates: 46°02′30″N 15°14′08″E
- Owner: Slovenian Railways
- Operator: Slovenian Railways
Location
- Location within Slovenia

Breg railway station (Slovene: Železniška postaja Breg) is the principal railway station serving Breg, Sevnica and Šentjur na Polju.
