= Horné Hámre =

Horné Hámre Felsőhámor
- Municipality
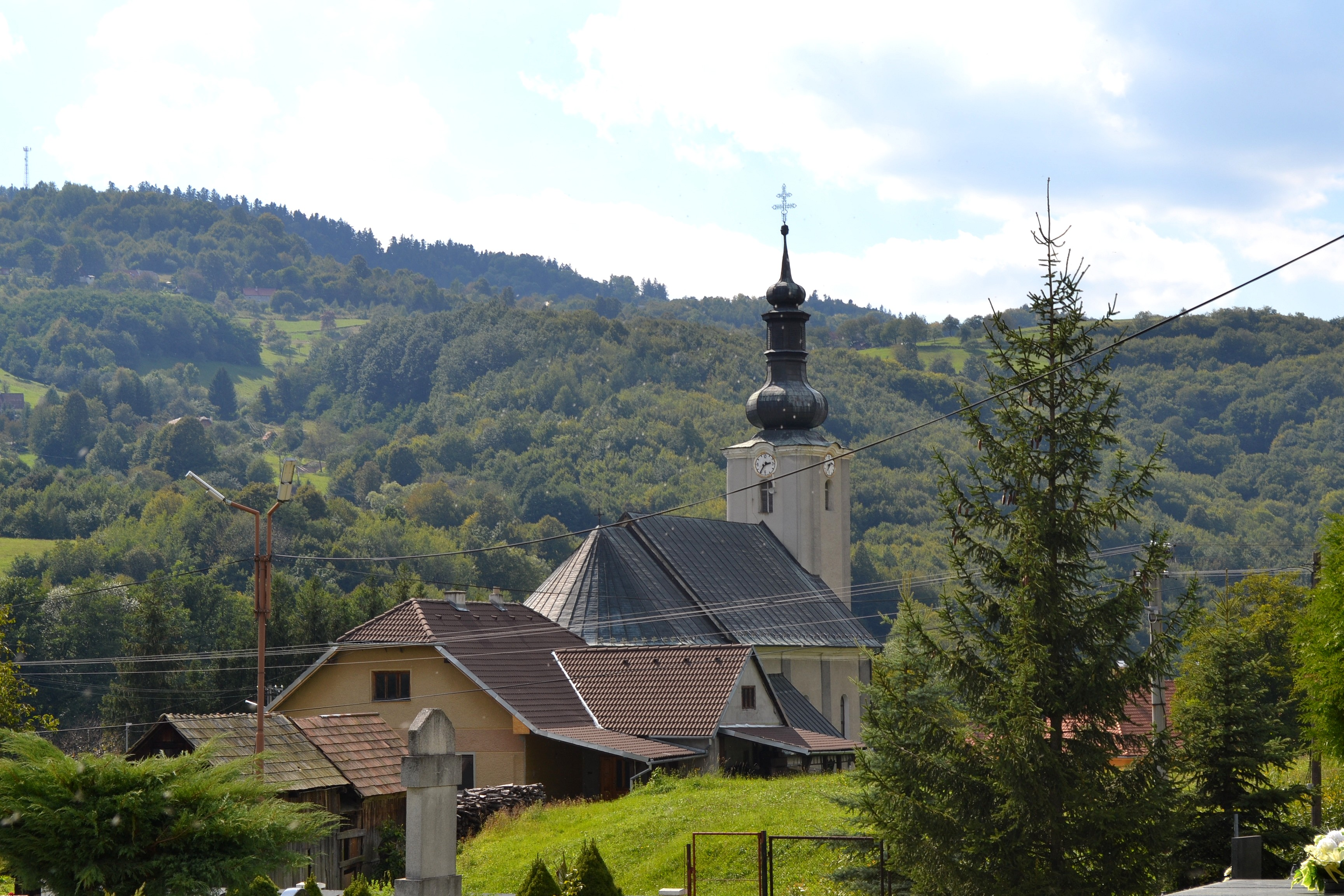

- Flag

- Location of Horné Hámre in the Banská Bystrica Region Location of Horné Hámre in Slovakia
- Coordinates: 48.50°N 18.67°E
- Country: Slovakia
- Region: Banská Bystrica Region
- District: Žarnovica District
- First mentioned: 1391

Area
  - Total: 19.67 km^{2} (7.59 sq mi)
- Elevation: 416 m (1,365 ft)

Population (2025)
  - Total: 717
- Time zone: UTC+1 (CET)
  - Summer (DST): UTC+2 (CEST)
- Postal code: 966 71
- Area code: +421 45
- Vehicle registration plate (until 2022): ZC
- Website: www.hornehamre.sk

Horné Hámre (Hungarian: Felsőhámor) is a village and municipality in the Žarnovica District, Banská Bystrica Region in Slovakia.

== Geography ==
The municipality lies at an altitude of 416 metres (1,365 ft) and covers an area of 19.67 km^{2} (7.59 sq mi) (2025).

== Population ==
Population statistic (10 years)
| Year | 1995 | 2005 | 2015 | 2025 |
|---|---|---|---|---|
| Count | 677 | 665 | 627 | 717 |
| Difference | | −1.77% | −5.71% | +14.35% |

Population statistic
| Year | 2024 | 2025 |
|---|---|---|
| Count | 690 | 717 |
| Difference | | +3.91% |

It has a population of 717 people (31 December 2025).

=== Ethnicity ===
Census 2021 (1+ %)
| Ethnicity | Number | Fraction |
|---|---|---|
| Slovak | 641 | 97.41% |
| Not found out | 16 | 2.43% |
| Total | 658 | |

In year 2021 was 658 people by ethnicity 641 as Slovak, 16 as Not found out, 6 as Hungarian, 3 as Czech, 3 as Other, 1 as Romani, 1 as Romanian, 1 as Austrian and 1 as German.

Note on population: The difference values of population numbers in the table "Population statistic" and in the sections "Ethnicity" & "Religion" is caused by the use of various statistical methods.

=== Religion ===
Census 2021 (1+ %)
| Religion | Number | Fraction |
|---|---|---|
| Roman Catholic Church | 512 | 77.81% |
| None | 110 | 16.72% |
| Not found out | 22 | 3.34% |
| Total | 658 | |

In year 2021 was 658 people by religion 512 from Roman Catholic Church, 110 from None, 22 from Not found out, 3 from Greek Catholic Church, 3 from Evangelical Church, 2 from Other, 2 from Ad hoc movements, 1 from Other and not ascertained christian church, 1 from Jehovah's Witnesses, 1 from Islam and 1 from Seventh-day Adventist Church.

== Genealogical resources ==
The records for genealogical research are available at the state archive "Statny Archiv in Banska Bystrica, Slovakia"

- Roman Catholic church records (births/marriages/deaths): 1715-1921 (parish A)
- Lutheran church records (births/marriages/deaths): 1812-1895 (parish B)

== See also ==
- List of municipalities and towns in Slovakia
