= Orovnica =

Orovnica Oromfalu
- Municipality
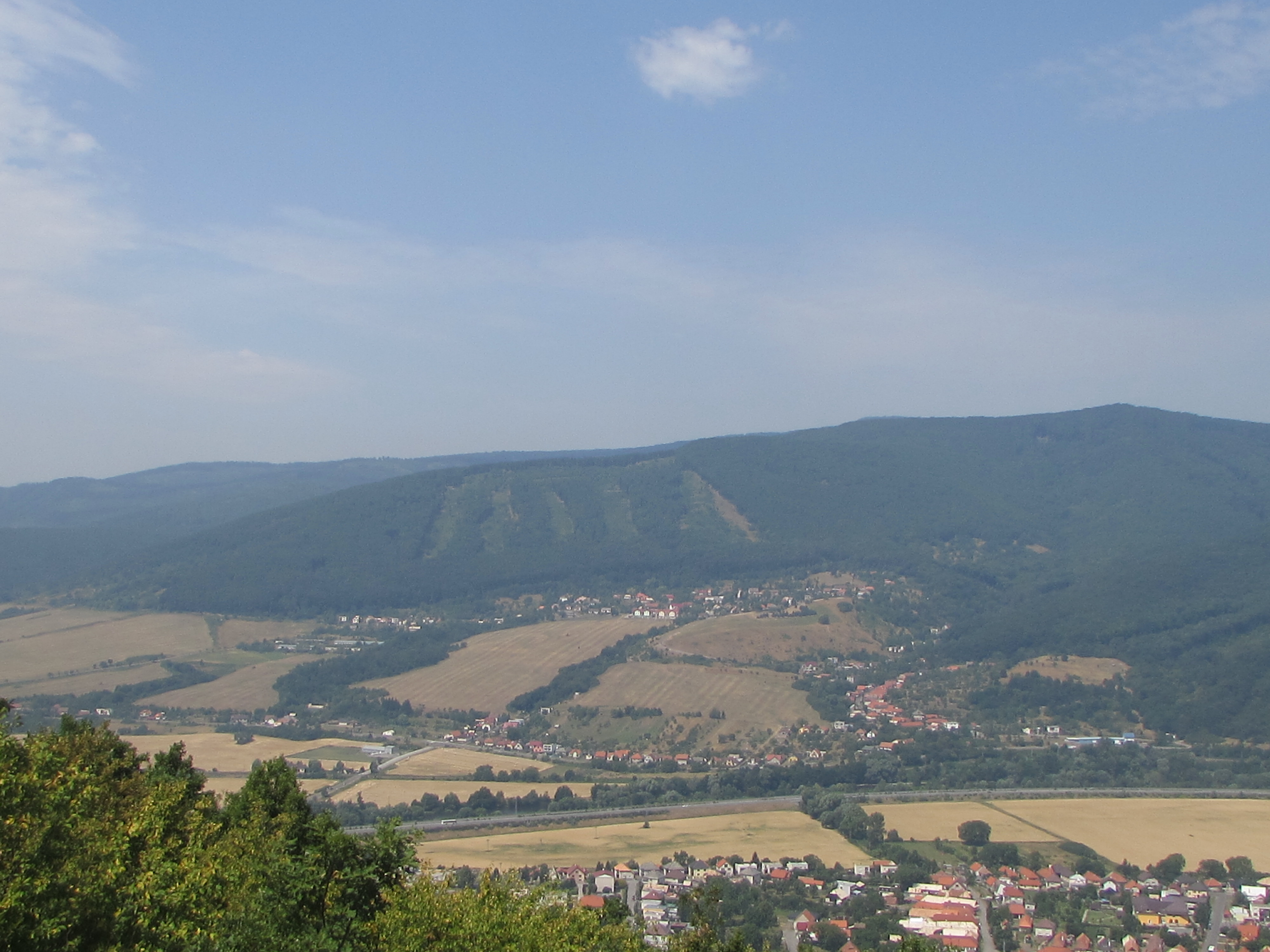

- Flag

- Location of Orovnica in the Banská Bystrica Region Location of Orovnica in Slovakia
- Coordinates: 48.38°N 18.60°E
- Country: Slovakia
- Region: Banská Bystrica Region
- District: Žarnovica District
- First mentioned: 1209

Area
  - Total: 14.24 km^{2} (5.50 sq mi)
- Elevation: 321 m (1,053 ft)

Population (2025)
  - Total: 511
- Time zone: UTC+1 (CET)
  - Summer (DST): UTC+2 (CEST)
- Postal code: 966 52
- Area code: +421 45
- Vehicle registration plate (until 2022): ZC
- Website: orovnica.eu

Orovnica (Hungarian: Oromfalu) is a village and municipality in the Žarnovica District, Banská Bystrica Region in Slovakia.

== Geography ==
The municipality lies at an altitude of 321 metres (1,053 ft) and covers an area of 14.24 km^{2} (5.50 sq mi) (2025).

== Etymology ==
The name comes from the Slovak orovnať—to level (ground). Orovnica—leveled ground. 1209 Varanza, 1525 Orownycza.

== Population ==
Population statistic (10 years)
Year	1995	2005	2015	2025
Count	576	555	565	511
Difference		−3.64%	+1.80%	−9.55%

Population statistic
Year	2024	2025
Count	513	511
Difference		−0.38%

It has a population of 511 people (31 December 2025).

=== Ethnicity ===
Census 2021 (1+ %)
Ethnicity	Number	Fraction
Slovak	532	97.97%
Not found out	8	1.47%
Total	543	

In year 2021 was 543 people by ethnicity 532 as Slovak, 8 as Not found out, 4 as Polish, 3 as Czech, 3 as Hungarian, 1 as Russian and 1 as Other.

Note on population: The difference values of population numbers in the table "Population statistic" and in the sections "Ethnicity" & "Religion" is caused by the use of various statistical methods.

=== Religion ===
Census 2021 (1+ %)
Religion	Number	Fraction
Roman Catholic Church	403	74.22%
None	97	17.86%
Not found out	23	4.24%
Evangelical Church	7	1.29%
Total	543	

In year 2021 was 543 people by religion 403 from Roman Catholic Church, 97 from None, 23 from Not found out, 7 from Evangelical Church, 3 from Christian Congregations in Slovakia, 3 from Ad hoc movements, 2 from Paganism and natural spirituality, 2 from Greek Catholic Church, 1 from Jehovah's Witnesses, 1 from Other and 1 from Seventh-day Adventist Church.
