= Rudno nad Hronom =

Rudno nad Hronom Garamrudnó
- Municipality
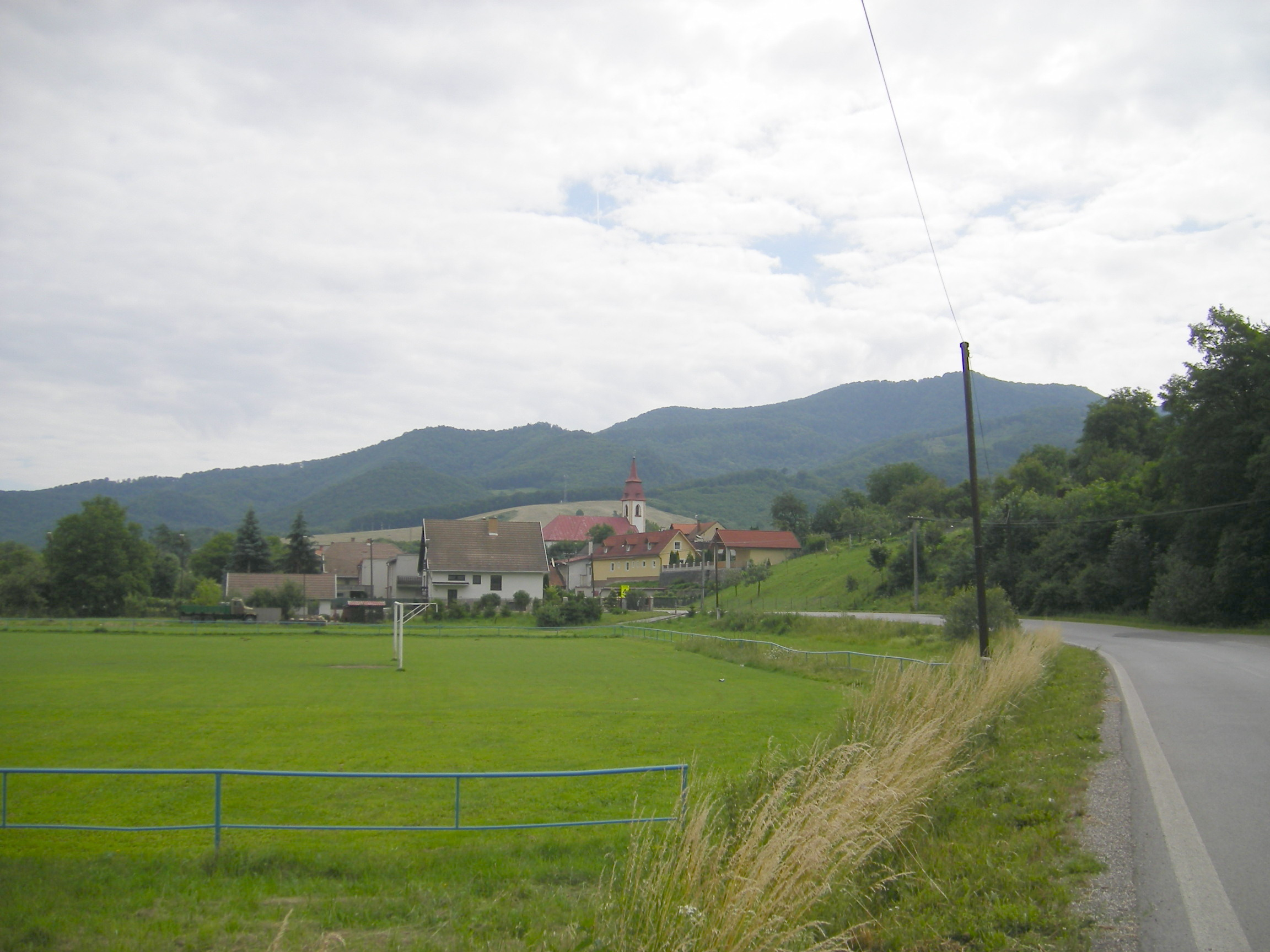

- Flag

- Location of Rudno nad Hronom in the Banská Bystrica Region Location of Rudno nad Hronom in Slovakia
- Coordinates: 48.42°N 18.69°E
- Country: Slovakia
- Region: Banská Bystrica Region
- District: Žarnovica District
- First mentioned: 1283

Area
  - Total: 19.28 km^{2} (7.44 sq mi)
- Elevation: 207 m (679 ft)

Population (2025)
  - Total: 517
- Time zone: UTC+1 (CET)
  - Summer (DST): UTC+2 (CEST)
- Postal code: 966 51
- Area code: +421 45
- Vehicle registration plate (until 2022): ZC
- Website: www.rudnonadhronom.sk

Rudno nad Hronom (Hungarian: Garamrudnó) is a village and municipality in the Žarnovica District, Banská Bystrica Region in Slovakia.

== Geography ==
The municipality lies at an altitude of 207 metres (679 ft) and covers an area of 19.28 km^{2} (7.44 sq mi) (2025).

== Population ==
Population statistic (10 years)
Year	1995	2005	2015	2025
Count	563	518	517	517
Difference		−7.99%	−0.19%	+0%

Population statistic
Year	2024	2025
Count	511	517
Difference		+1.17%

It has a population of 517 people (31 December 2025).

=== Ethnicity ===
Census 2021 (1+ %)
Ethnicity	Number	Fraction
Slovak	507	94.23%
Not found out	31	5.76%
Total	538	

In year 2021 was 538 people by ethnicity 507 as Slovak, 31 as Not found out, 5 as Czech, 4 as Other, 2 as Romani, 1 as Polish, 1 as German and 1 as Hungarian.

Note on population: The difference values of population numbers in the table "Population statistic" and in the sections "Ethnicity" & "Religion" is caused by the use of various statistical methods.

=== Religion ===
Census 2021 (1+ %)
Religion	Number	Fraction
Roman Catholic Church	358	66.54%
None	118	21.93%
Not found out	38	7.06%
Christian Congregations in Slovakia	7	1.3%
Total	538	

In year 2021 was 538 people by religion 358 from Roman Catholic Church, 118 from None, 38 from Not found out, 7 from Christian Congregations in Slovakia, 5 from Other, 5 from Evangelical Church, 3 from Greek Catholic Church, 1 from Eastern Orthodox Church, 1 from Other and not ascertained christian church, 1 from Jehovah's Witnesses and 1 from Hinduism.

== Notable people ==
- Marianna Grznárová (1941–2025), writer
