= Župkov =

Župkov Erdősurány
- Municipality
- Flag

- Location of Župkov in the Banská Bystrica Region Location of Župkov in Slovakia
- Coordinates: 48.53°N 18.63°E
- Country: Slovakia
- Region: Banská Bystrica Region
- District: Žarnovica District
- First mentioned: 1808

Area
  - Total: 10.24 km^{2} (3.95 sq mi)
- Elevation: 315 m (1,033 ft)

Population (2025)
  - Total: 825
- Time zone: UTC+1 (CET)
  - Summer (DST): UTC+2 (CEST)
- Postal code: 966 71
- Area code: +421 45
- Vehicle registration plate (until 2022): ZC
- Website: www.zupkov.sk

Župkov (Hungarian: Erdősurány) is a village and municipality in the Žarnovica District, Banská Bystrica Region in Slovakia. It has an area of 10.34 km^{2} (3.99 sq mi) and a population of 851 people as of 31 December 2023 and its population density is 82.3/km^{2} (213.2/sq mi). It is the last Slovak municipality by alphabetical order.

== Geography ==
The municipality lies at an altitude of 315 metres (1,033 ft) and covers an area of 10.24 km^{2} (3.95 sq mi) (2025).

== Population ==
Population statistic (10 years)
Year	1995	2005	2015	2025
Count	729	728	864	825
Difference		−0.13%	+18.68%	−4.51%

Population statistic
Year	2024	2025
Count	842	825
Difference		−2.01%

It has a population of 825 people (31 December 2025).

=== Ethnicity ===
Census 2021 (1+ %)
Ethnicity	Number	Fraction
Slovak	805	91.89%
Romani	55	6.27%
Not found out	25	2.85%
Total	876	

In year 2021 was 876 people by ethnicity 805 as Slovak, 55 as Romani, 25 as Not found out, 4 as Czech, 3 as Hungarian, 2 as Ukrainian, 2 as Russian, 1 as Vietnamese, 1 as Italian, 1 as Rusyn and 1 as Polish.

Note on population: The difference values of population numbers in the table "Population statistic" and in the sections "Ethnicity" & "Religion" is caused by the use of various statistical methods.

=== Religion ===
Census 2021 (1+ %)
Religion	Number	Fraction
Roman Catholic Church	634	72.37%
None	119	13.58%
Not found out	91	10.39%
Greek Catholic Church	11	1.26%
Total	876	

In year 2021 was 876 people by religion 634 from Roman Catholic Church, 119 from None, 91 from Not found out, 11 from Greek Catholic Church, 7 from Evangelical Church, 5 from Christian Congregations in Slovakia, 3 from Other and not ascertained christian church, 3 from Ad hoc movements, 1 from Calvinist Church, 1 from Other and 1 from Buddhism.
