= Voznica =

Village and municipality in Slovakia

Voznica Garamrév
- Municipality
- Flag

- Location of Voznica in the Banská Bystrica Region Location of Voznica in Slovakia
- Coordinates: 48.47°N 18.70°E
- Country: Slovakia
- Region: Banská Bystrica Region
- District: Žarnovica District
- First mentioned: 1075

Area
  - Total: 17.17 km^{2} (6.63 sq mi)
- Elevation: 213 m (699 ft)

Population (2025)
  - Total: 650
- Time zone: UTC+1 (CET)
  - Summer (DST): UTC+2 (CEST)
- Postal code: 966 81
- Area code: +421 45
- Vehicle registration plate (until 2022): ZC
- Website: www.voznica.sk

Voznica (Hungarian: Garamrév) is a village and municipality in the Žarnovica District, Banská Bystrica Region in Slovakia with a population of 640 in 2014. The village is located in the Hron valley.

== Geography ==
The municipality lies at an altitude of 213 metres (699 ft) and covers an area of 17.17 km^{2} (6.63 sq mi) (2025).

== History ==
The first written mention of the settlement is dated in 1075.

== Population ==
Population statistic (10 years)
Year	1995	2005	2015	2025
Count	635	648	640	650
Difference		+2.04%	−1.23%	+1.56%

Population statistic
Year	2024	2025
Count	640	650
Difference		+1.56%

It has a population of 650 people (31 December 2025).

=== Ethnicity ===
Census 2021 (1+ %)
Ethnicity	Number	Fraction
Slovak	618	97.63%
Not found out	16	2.52%
Total	633	

In year 2021 was 633 people by ethnicity 618 as Slovak, 16 as Not found out, 2 as Czech, 2 as English, 1 as Romani, 1 as Polish and 1 as Moravian.

Note on population: The difference values of population numbers in the table "Population statistic" and in the sections "Ethnicity" & "Religion" is caused by the use of various statistical methods.

=== Religion ===
Census 2021 (1+ %)
Religion	Number	Fraction
Roman Catholic Church	481	75.99%
None	115	18.17%
Not found out	14	2.21%
Evangelical Church	10	1.58%
Other	8	1.26%
Total	633	

In year 2021 was 633 people by religion 481 from Roman Catholic Church, 115 from None, 14 from Not found out, 10 from Evangelical Church, 8 from Other, 2 from Other and not ascertained christian church, 2 from Christian Congregations in Slovakia and 1 from Paganism and natural spirituality.
