= Veľké Pole =

Veľké Pole Pálosnagymező
- Municipality
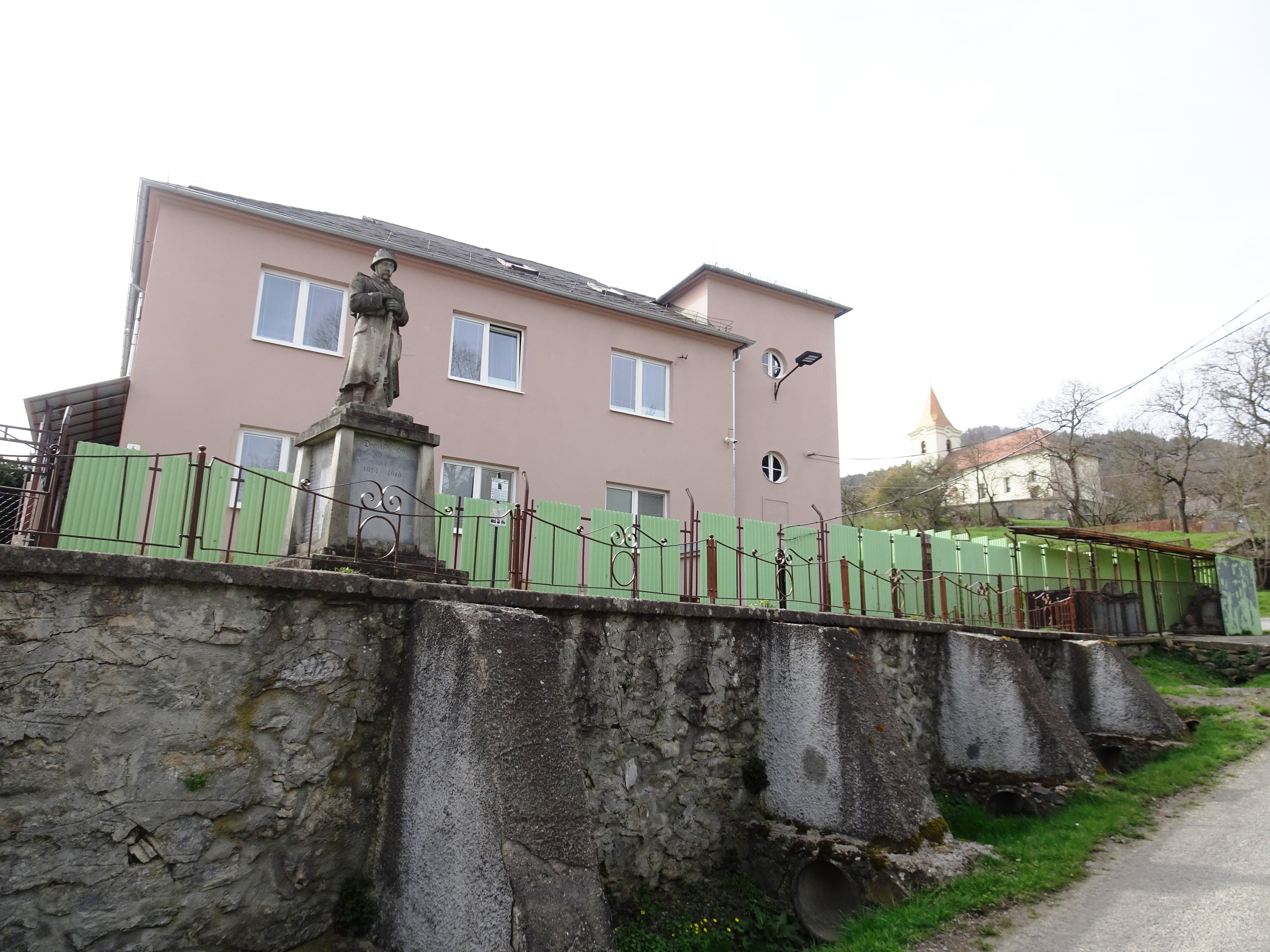

- Flag

- Location of Veľké Pole in the Banská Bystrica Region Location of Veľké Pole in Slovakia
- Coordinates: 48.54°N 18.57°E
- Country: Slovakia
- Region: Banská Bystrica Region
- District: Žarnovica District
- First mentioned: 1332

Area
  - Total: 35.61 km^{2} (13.75 sq mi)
- Elevation: 522 m (1,713 ft)

Population (2025)
  - Total: 415
- Time zone: UTC+1 (CET)
  - Summer (DST): UTC+2 (CEST)
- Postal code: 966 74
- Area code: +421 45
- Vehicle registration plate (until 2022): ZC
- Website: www.velkepole.sk

Veľké Pole (German: Hochwies; Hungarian: Pálosnagymező) is a village and municipality in the Žarnovica District, Banská Bystrica Region in Slovakia.

== Geography ==
The municipality lies at an altitude of 522 metres (1,713 ft) and covers an area of 35.61 km^{2} (13.75 sq mi) (2025).

== History ==
Hochwies - a Carpathian Germans village in the Hauerland, from the 13th century to 1945, in the territory of today's Slovakia.

== Population ==
Population statistic (10 years)
Year	1995	2005	2015	2025
Count	470	481	397	415
Difference		+2.34%	−17.46%	+4.53%

Population statistic
Year	2024	2025
Count	417	415
Difference		−0.47%

It has a population of 415 people (31 December 2025).

=== Ethnicity ===
Census 2021 (1+ %)
Ethnicity	Number	Fraction
Slovak	414	98.33%
Romani	6	1.42%
Total	421	

In year 2021 was 421 people by ethnicity 414 as Slovak, 6 as Romani, 4 as Not found out, 3 as Hungarian and 2 as Other.

Note on population: The difference values of population numbers in the table "Population statistic" and in the sections "Ethnicity" & "Religion" is caused by the use of various statistical methods.

=== Religion ===
Census 2021 (1+ %)
Religion	Number	Fraction
Roman Catholic Church	304	72.21%
None	88	20.9%
Evangelical Church	8	1.9%
Not found out	6	1.43%
Jehovah's Witnesses	5	1.19%
Total	421	

In year 2021 was 421 people by religion 304 from Roman Catholic Church, 88 from None, 8 from Evangelical Church, 6 from Not found out, 5 from Jehovah's Witnesses, 4 from Christian Congregations in Slovakia, 1 from Calvinist Church, 1 from Eastern Orthodox Church, 1 from Paganism and natural spirituality, 1 from Other and not ascertained christian church, 1 from Greek Catholic Church and 1 from Ad hoc movements.
