= Ostrý Grúň =

Ostrý Grúň Élesmart
- Municipality
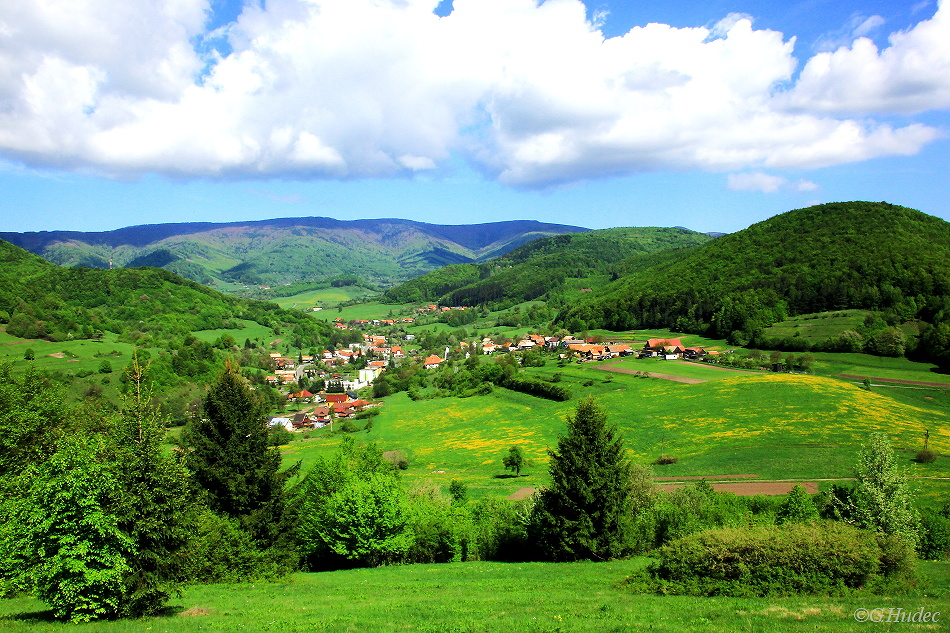

- Flag

- Location of Ostrý Grúň in the Banská Bystrica Region Location of Ostrý Grúň in Slovakia
- Coordinates: 48.56°N 18.66°E
- Country: Slovakia
- Region: Banská Bystrica Region
- District: Žarnovica District
- First mentioned: 1951

Area
  - Total: 16.79 km^{2} (6.48 sq mi)
- Elevation: 441 m (1,447 ft)

Population (2025)
  - Total: 542
- Time zone: UTC+1 (CET)
  - Summer (DST): UTC+2 (CEST)
- Postal code: 966 77
- Area code: +421 45
- Vehicle registration plate (until 2022): ZC
- Website: www.ostrygrun.sk

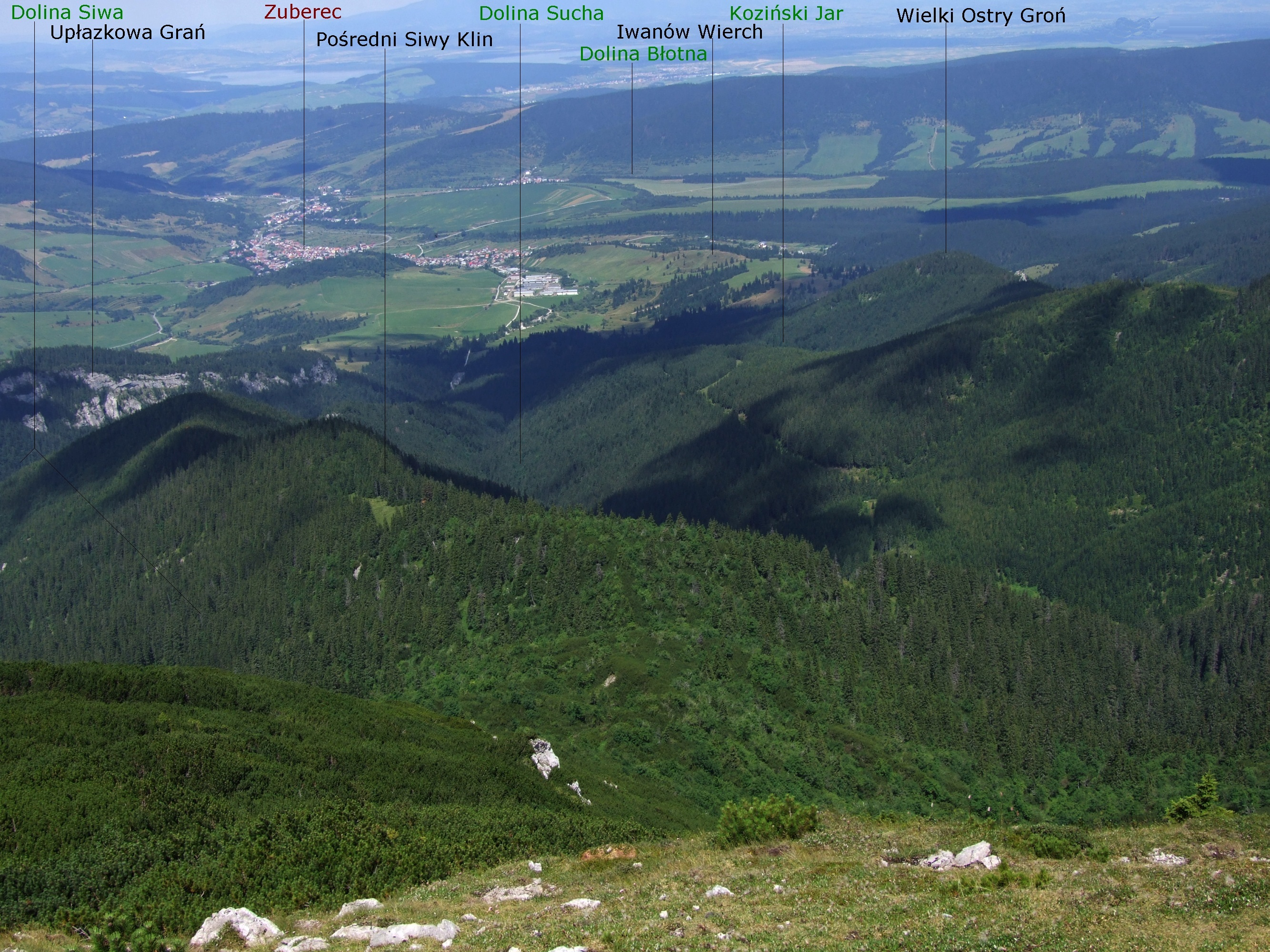
View of Ostrý Grúň in Zuberska valley

Ostrý Grúň (Hungarian: Élesmart) is a village and municipality in the Žarnovica District, Banská Bystrica Region in Slovakia.

== History ==
The village was massacred and burned down in January 1945 by the Nazi anti-partisan unit Edelweiss, after the suppression of the Slovak National Uprising.

== Geography ==
The municipality lies at an altitude of 441 metres (1,447 ft) and covers an area of 16.79 km^{2} (6.48 sq mi) (2025). It is part of the Vtáčnik mountain range, within the Slovak Central Mountains.

== Population ==
Population statistic (10 years)
Year	1995	2005	2015	2025
Count	583	585	504	542
Difference		+0.34%	−13.84%	+7.53%

Population statistic
Year	2024	2025
Count	546	542
Difference		−0.73%

It has a population of 542 people (31 December 2025).

=== Ethnicity ===
Census 2021 (1+ %)
Ethnicity	Number	Fraction
Slovak	510	94.61%
Not found out	25	4.63%
Total	539	

In year 2021 was 539 people by ethnicity 510 as Slovak, 25 as Not found out, 2 as Romani, 2 as Greek, 1 as Czech, 1 as Romanian and 1 as Hungarian.

Note on population: The difference values of population numbers in the table "Population statistic" and in the sections "Ethnicity" & "Religion" is caused by the use of various statistical methods.

=== Religion ===
Census 2021 (1+ %)
Religion	Number	Fraction
Roman Catholic Church	399	74.03%
None	96	17.81%
Not found out	25	4.64%
Total	539	

In year 2021 was 539 people by religion 399 from Roman Catholic Church, 96 from None, 25 from Not found out, 5 from Ad hoc movements, 4 from Evangelical Church, 3 from Other, 2 from Calvinist Church, 2 from Other and not ascertained christian church, 1 from Old Catholic Church, 1 from Christian Congregations in Slovakia and 1 from United Methodist Church.

In 2011, 86% of the population identified as Slovak. The religious makeup was 75.6% Roman Catholic and 4.2% unaffiliated.

== International relations ==
=== Twin towns — Sister cities ===
Ostrý Grúň is twinned with:

- Kandanos, Greece (since 1987)
