= Abwehrgruppe 218 =

German unit in Slovakia during World War II

Abwehrgruppe 218, known under the codename "Edelweiss" (German: "Edelweiß"), was a German rear-security unit operating in Slovakia during World War II. Unit was constituted during September 1944 and led by SS-Sturmbannführer Erwein von Thun-Hohenstein. In the period from September 1944 to April 1945 the unit carried out more than 50 missions, which resulted in killing around 300 people, including civilians; another 600 were taken prisoner. One of the most famous actions of the unit was the capture of members of an American OSS mission under command of Lieutenant James Holt Greene and a British SOE mission under Major John Sehmer on 26 December 1944 in the Nízke Tatry Mountains. The unit is known for a number of war crimes, especially the massacre of civilians in the villages of Ostrý Grúň and Kľak, among the most notorious war crimes committed on Slovak territory during the war.

Abwehrgruppe 218 "Edelweiss" had around 250-300 men in four sections:

- the "Partisan" section: about 25 men under the direct command of SS-Sturmbannführer von Thun-Hohenstein
- the "Russian" section: about 50 men under command of SS-Oberscharführer Berlisov
- the "Caucasian" section: about 50 men under command of SS-Oberscharführer Khan
- the "Slovak" section: about 131 men under command of SS-Hauptsturmführer Nižňanský
