= Brijeg =

Vranići
- Village
- Location within Bosnia and Herzegovina
- Coordinates: 43°37′29″N 18°54′47″E
- Country: Bosnia and Herzegovina
- Entity: Federation of Bosnia and Herzegovina
- Canton: Bosnian-Podrinje Goražde
- Municipality: Goražde

Area
  - Total: 0.43 sq mi (1.11 km^{2})
- Elevation: 1,286 ft (392 m)

Population (2013)
  - Total: 183
  - Density: 427/sq mi (165/km^{2})
- Time zone: UTC+1 (CET)
  - Summer (DST): UTC+2 (CEST)

Brijeg, also known as Vranići, is a village in the municipality of Goražde, Bosnia and Herzegovina.

== Demographics ==
According to the 2013 census, its population was 183, all Bosniaks.
