= Žarnovica =

Žarnovica Zsarnóca
- Municipality
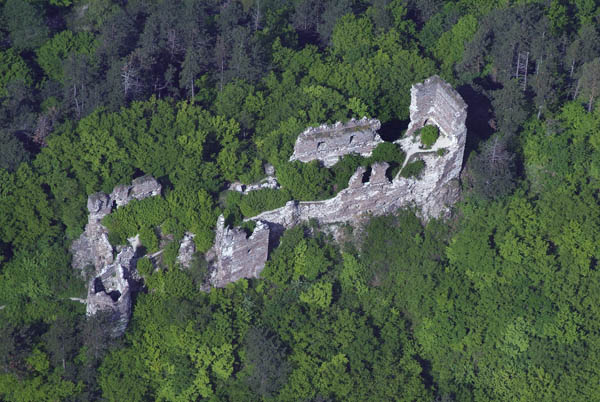
- Ruins of castle Revište in municipal district Revištské Podzámčie

- Flag Coat of arms

- Location of Žarnovica in the Banská Bystrica Region Location of Žarnovica in Slovakia
- Coordinates: 48.48°N 18.72°E
- Country: Slovakia
- Region: Banská Bystrica Region
- District: Žarnovica District
- First mentioned: 1332

Government
  - Mayor: Alena Kazimírová

Area
  - Total: 30.39 km^{2} (11.73 sq mi)
- Elevation: 252 m (827 ft)

Population (2025)
  - Total: 5,509
- Time zone: UTC+1 (CET)
  - Summer (DST): UTC+2 (CEST)
- Postal code: 966 81
- Area code: +421 45
- Vehicle registration plate (until 2022): ZC
- Website: www.zarnovica.sk

Žarnovica (German: Scharnowitz; Hungarian: Zsarnóca) is a town and municipality in the Žarnovica District, Banská Bystrica Region in Slovakia. The town is situated in the Hron river valley. It has a population of around 6,000 people.

== History ==
The first written mention about Žarnovica is dated to 1332.

== Geography ==
The municipality lies at an altitude of 252 metres (827 ft) and covers an area of 30.39 km^{2} (11.73 sq mi) (2025). It is located in the Žiar Basin in central Slovakia, on the Hron River, between Vtáčnik and Štiavnické vrchy mountain ranges.

== Population ==
Historical population
Year	Pop.	±%
1970	4,030	—
1980	4,669	+15.9%
1991	6,532	+39.9%
2001	6,596	+1.0%
2011	6,490	−1.6%
2021	5,830	−10.2%
Source: Censuses

Population statistic (10 years)
Year	1995	2005	2015	2025
Count	6595	6501	6374	5509
Difference		−1.42%	−1.95%	−13.57%

Population statistic
Year	2024	2025
Count	5576	5509
Difference		−1.20%

It has a population of 5509 people (31 December 2025).

=== Ethnicity ===
Census 2021 (1+ %)
Ethnicity	Number	Fraction
Slovak	5326	91.35%
Not found out	438	7.51%
Romani	65	1.11%
Total	5830	

In year 2021 was 5830 people by ethnicity 5326 as Slovak, 438 as Not found out, 65 as Romani, 33 as Czech, 29 as Polish, 11 as Hungarian, 9 as Vietnamese, 9 as Other, 8 as Chinese, 4 as Rusyn, 4 as German, 3 as Russian, 3 as Moravian, 2 as Greek, 2 as English, 2 as Albanian, 1 as Ukrainian and 1 as Austrian.

Note on population: The difference values of population numbers in the table "Population statistic" and in the sections "Ethnicity" & "Religion" is caused by the use of various statistical methods.

=== Religion ===
Census 2021 (1+ %)
Religion	Number	Fraction
Roman Catholic Church	3635	62.35%
None	1531	26.26%
Not found out	452	7.75%
Evangelical Church	81	1.39%
Total	5830	

In year 2021 was 5830 people by religion 3635 from Roman Catholic Church, 1531 from None, 452 from Not found out, 81 from Evangelical Church, 26 from Greek Catholic Church, 25 from Christian Congregations in Slovakia, 19 from Ad hoc movements, 14 from Eastern Orthodox Church, 10 from Buddhism, 8 from Other, 7 from Calvinist Church, 4 from Other and not ascertained christian church, 4 from Jehovah's Witnesses, 4 from Islam, 3 from Seventh-day Adventist Church, 2 from United Methodist Church, 1 from Old Catholic Church, 1 from Paganism and natural spirituality, 1 from Hinduism, 1 from Church of the Brethren and 1 from Apostolic Church.

== Sport ==
- Speedway Žarnovica is a motorcycle speedway venue in the centre of the town. It hosts major international events.
