= Brehy, Žarnovica District =

Village and municipality in Slovakia

Brehy Magasmart
- Municipality
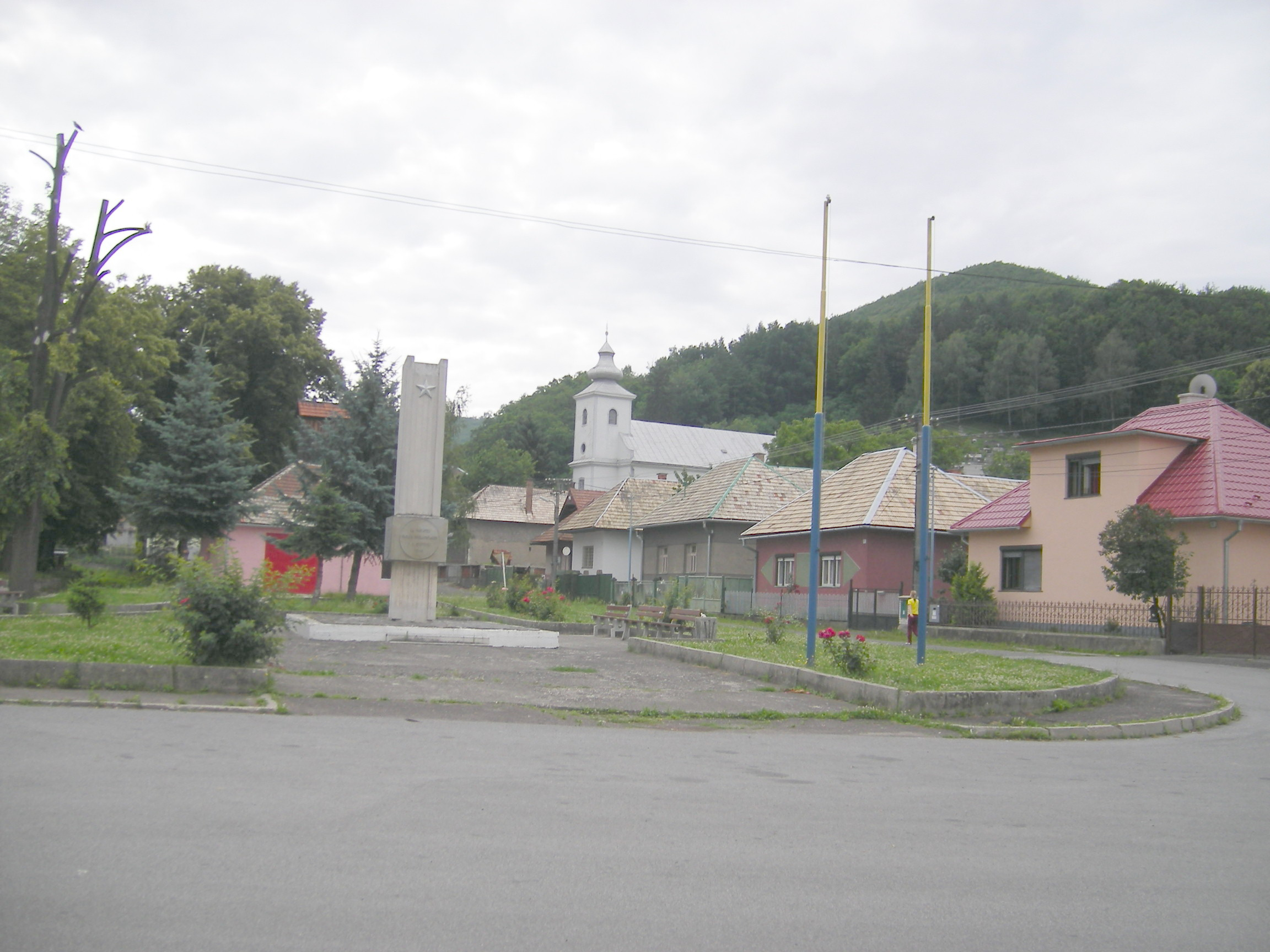

- Flag

- Location of Brehy in the Banská Bystrica Region Location of Brehy in Slovakia
- Coordinates: 48.40°N 18.65°E
- Country: Slovakia
- Region: Banská Bystrica Region
- District: Žarnovica District
- First mentioned: 1283

Area
  - Total: 12.36 km^{2} (4.77 sq mi)
- Elevation: 221 m (725 ft)

Population (2025)
  - Total: 978
- Time zone: UTC+1 (CET)
  - Summer (DST): UTC+2 (CEST)
- Postal code: 968 01
- Area code: +421 45
- Vehicle registration plate (until 2022): ZC
- Website: www.brehy.sk

Brehy (German: Hochwald, Hohenmaut, Hochstein, Hochstätten; Hungarian: Magasmart, until 1890: Magaspart) is a village and municipality in the Žarnovica District, Banská Bystrica Region in Slovakia.

== History ==
In historical records, the village was first mentioned in 1283 when German colonists arrived here for overworking local mines of silver (from I. Lasslob "Deutsche Ortsnamen in der Slowakei") In 1339 the King gave the village to the Sz. Elizabeth Hospital in Nová Baňa, in 1601 it passed to the noble Dóczy family.

== Population ==
Population statistic (10 years)
Year	1995	2005	2015	2025
Count	0	1107	1057	978
Difference		–	−4.51%	−7.47%

Population statistic
Year	2024	2025
Count	977	978
Difference		+0.10%

It has a population of 978 people (31 December 2025).

=== Ethnicity ===
Census 2021 (1+ %)
Ethnicity	Number	Fraction
Slovak	1011	98.15%
Romani	13	1.26%
Total	1030	

In year 2021 was 1030 people by ethnicity 1011 as Slovak, 13 as Romani, 6 as Czech, 5 as Not found out, 2 as Polish, 2 as German, 1 as Ukrainian, 1 as Rusyn, 1 as Russian, 1 as Other, 1 as French and 1 as Bulgarian.

Note on population: The difference values of population numbers in the table "Population statistic" and in the sections "Ethnicity" & "Religion" is caused by the use of various statistical methods.

=== Religion ===
Census 2021 (1+ %)
Religion	Number	Fraction
Roman Catholic Church	798	77.48%
None	177	17.18%
Not found out	12	1.17%
Evangelical Church	12	1.17%
Total	1030	

In year 2021 was 1030 people by religion 798 from Roman Catholic Church, 177 from None, 12 from Not found out, 12 from Evangelical Church, 9 from Christian Congregations in Slovakia, 8 from Greek Catholic Church, 4 from Islam, 3 from Other, 2 from Ad hoc movements, 1 from Eastern Orthodox Church, 1 from Paganism and natural spirituality, 1 from United Methodist Church, 1 from Church of the Brethren and 1 from Buddhism.

== Genealogical resources ==
The records for genealogical research are available at the state archive "Statny Archiv in Banska Bystrica, Slovakia"

- Roman Catholic church records (births/marriages/deaths): 1784-1896 (parish A)
- Lutheran church records (births/marriages/deaths): 1812-1895 (parish B)

== See also ==
- List of municipalities and towns in Slovakia
