= Nová Baňa =

Nová Baňa Újbánya
- Municipality
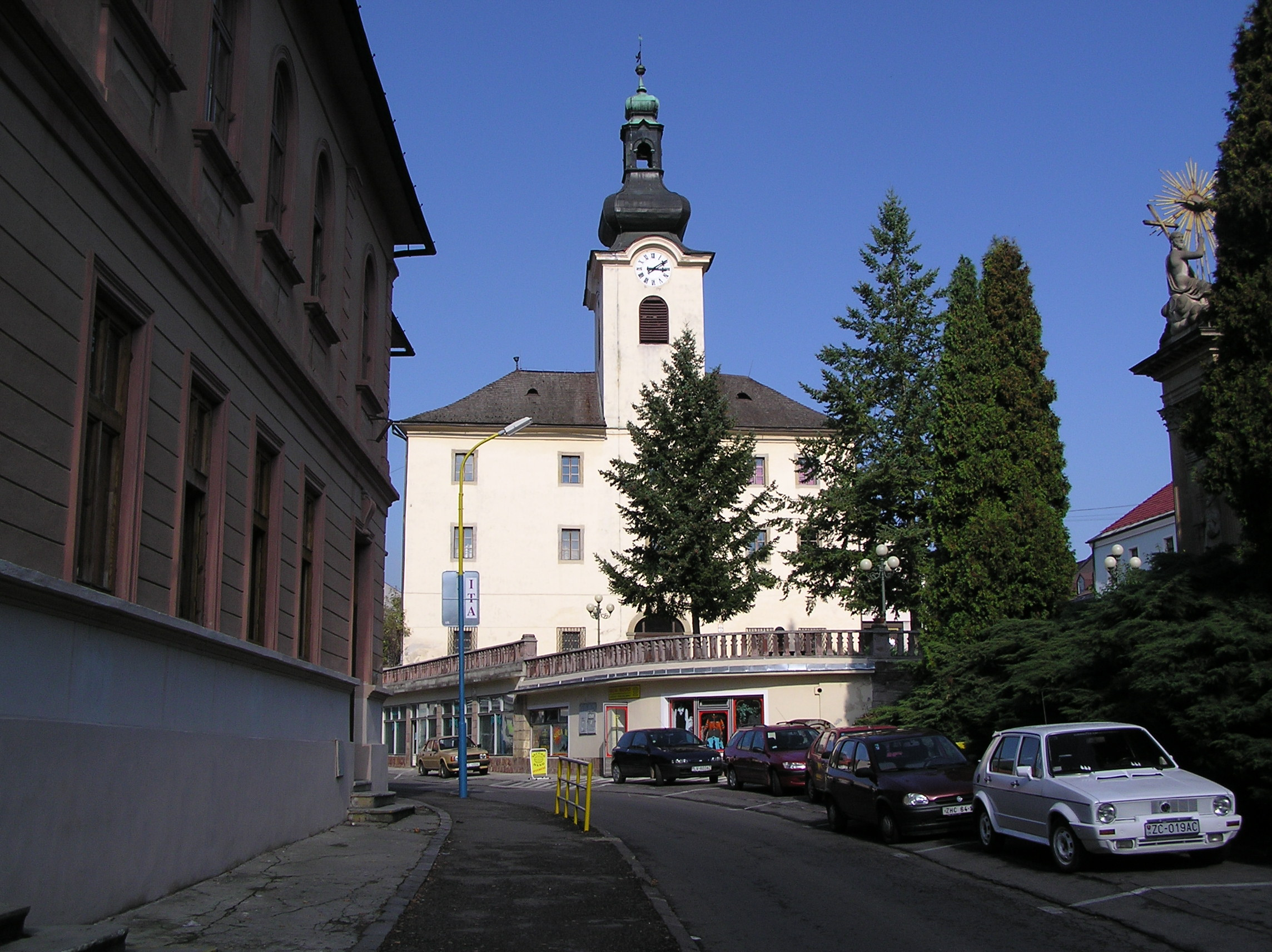
- Town Hall in Nová Baňa

- Flag Coat of arms

- Location of Nová Baňa in the Banská Bystrica Region Location of Nová Baňa in Slovakia
- Coordinates: 48.42°N 18.64°E
- Country: Slovakia
- Region: Banská Bystrica Region
- District: Žarnovica District
- First mentioned: 1337

Government
  - Mayor: Branislav Jaďuď

Area
  - Total: 61.25 km^{2} (23.65 sq mi)
- Elevation: 442 m (1,450 ft)

Population (2025)
  - Total: 6,799
- Time zone: UTC+1 (CET)
  - Summer (DST): UTC+2 (CEST)
- Postal code: 968 01
- Area code: +421 45
- Vehicle registration plate (until 2022): ZC
- Website: www.novabana.sk

Nová Baňa (German: Königsberg; Hungarian: Újbánya) is a town in the west of central Slovakia and the largest town of the Žarnovica District, located in the Banská Bystrica Region.

== Etymology ==
The original name of Nová Baňa was Štiavnica - derived from the still existing spring water (Slovak: šťava, štiavnica resp. ščevnica - "acid water"). The town was first mentioned as nova montanya Schewnyche (1337). The Slovak name was adopted also by German colonists (Schennych, Sewniche). Contemporary description noua montanya regis (new royal mine) became the basis of newer Slovak (Nová Baňa), German (Königsberg) and Hungarian name (Újbánya). In the mid-14th century, the new name became dominant probably to distinguish the town from Banská Štiavnica.

== Geography ==
The municipality lies at an altitude of 442 metres (1,450 ft) and covers an area of 61.25 km^{2} (23.65 sq mi) (2025).

Nová Baňa lies in right bank of Hron river. Nová Baňa region is surrounded by a ring of volcanic mountains (Štiavnica Mountains on the east, Pohronský Inovec on the south-west and Vtáčnik on the north-west). Seven kilometers from Nová Baňa, close by the village Tekovská Breznica, is the youngest volcano in Central Europe called Putikov vŕšok.

== History ==
Early settlement of the area is documented by old Slavonic hillfort Zámčisko built on the place of older Hallstatt hillfort. In the late 13th century, there was probably not any more significant village but dispersed Slovak settlements. Later, the burghers from Kremnica and Pukanec settled here, because gold was discovered in the area. In 1345 Nová Baňa became a "free royal mining town". The German "guests" had an important role in the development and administration of the town (almost all recorded names of mayors and members of the town council are exclusively German). In the 15th century, the town became less attractive for German miners because of the decline of the mining activities. Thereafter, Slovaks strengthen their position in the town and began to participate in the administration. The mines were closed down in 1887.

== Population ==
Historical population
Year	Pop.	±%
1970	6,259	—
1980	6,989	+11.7%
1991	7,400	+5.9%
2001	7,505	+1.4%
2011	7,551	+0.6%
2021	7,007	−7.2%
Source: Censuses

Population statistic (10 years)
Year	1995	2005	2015	2025
Count	8684	7429	7480	6799
Difference		−14.45%	+0.68%	−9.10%

Population statistic
Year	2024	2025
Count	6841	6799
Difference		−0.61%

It has a population of 6799 people (31 December 2025).

=== Ethnicity ===
Census 2021 (1+ %)
Ethnicity	Number	Fraction
Slovak	6553	93.52%
Not found out	382	5.45%
Total	7007	

In year 2021 was 7007 people by ethnicity 6553 as Slovak, 382 as Not found out, 46 as Other, 39 as Ukrainian, 38 as Czech, 21 as Hungarian, 14 as Romani, 12 as Russian, 8 as Rusyn, 8 as German, 7 as Polish, 6 as Chinese, 3 as Turkish, 3 as Italian, 2 as Vietnamese, 1 as Irish, 1 as Austrian, 1 as Moravian, 1 as Canadian, 1 as French and 1 as English.

Note on population: The difference values of population numbers in the table "Population statistic" and in the sections "Ethnicity" & "Religion" is caused by the use of various statistical methods.

=== Religion ===
Census 2021 (1+ %)
Religion	Number	Fraction
Roman Catholic Church	4878	69.62%
None	1449	20.68%
Not found out	383	5.47%
Total	7007	

In year 2021 was 7007 people by religion 4878 from Roman Catholic Church, 1449 from None, 383 from Not found out, 57 from Greek Catholic Church, 55 from Evangelical Church, 40 from Eastern Orthodox Church, 39 from Christian Congregations in Slovakia, 29 from Ad hoc movements, 23 from Other, 21 from Other and not ascertained christian church, 11 from Buddhism, 8 from Paganism and natural spirituality, 5 from Calvinist Church, 4 from Islam, 3 from Apostolic Church and 2 from Jewish community.

== Twin towns — sister cities ==
Nová Baňa is twinned with:

- Mimoň, Czech Republic
- Nin, Croatia
