= Žarnovica District =

Coordinates: 48°29′18″N 18°42′28″E

- District
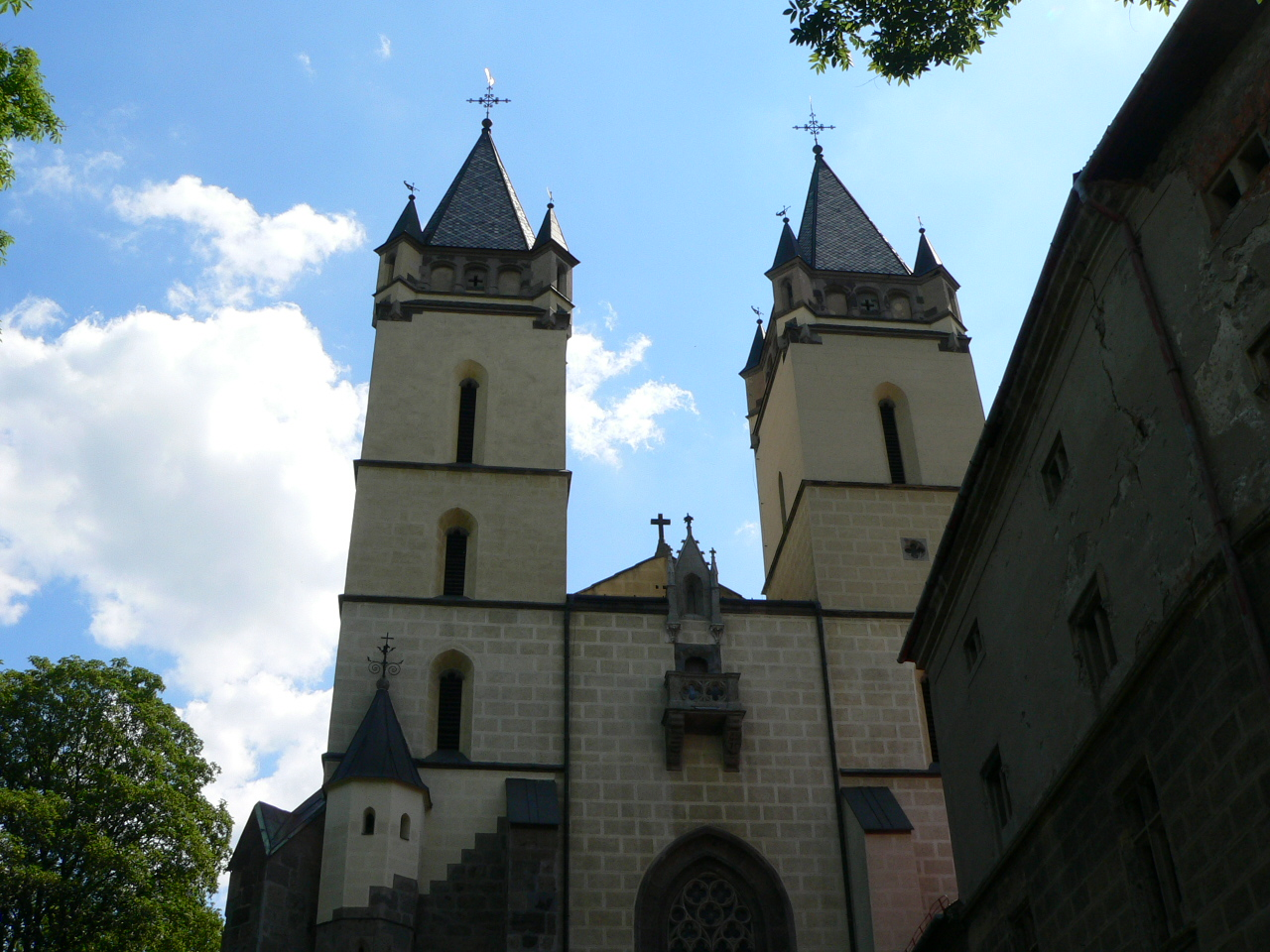
- Country: Slovakia
- Region (kraj): Banská Bystrica Region
- Seat: Žarnovica

Area
  - Total: 425.08 km^{2} (164.12 sq mi)

Population (2025)
  - Total: 24,327
- Time zone: UTC+1 (CET)
  - Summer (DST): UTC+2 (CEST)
- Telephone prefix: 45
- Vehicle registration plate (until 2022): ZC
- Municipalities: 18

Žarnovica District (Slovak: okres Žarnovica) is a district in the Banská Bystrica Region of central Slovakia. Until 1918, the district was mostly part of the county of Kingdom of Hungary of Tekov, only a part of Hodruša-Hámre, namely Banská Hodruša in the east was part of Banská Štiavnica, an urban county on the territory of Hont County.

== Population ==
Population statistic (10 years)
Year	1995	2005	2015	2025
Count	27,879	27,266	26,540	24,327
Difference		−2.19%	−2.66%	−8.33%

Population statistic
Year	2024	2025
Count	24,463	24,327
Difference		−0.55%

It has a population of 24,327 people (31 December 2025).

Historical population
Year	Pop.	±%
1970	28,747	—
1980	28,294	−1.6%
1991	27,967	−1.2%
2001	27,634	−1.2%
2011	27,084	−2.0%
2021	25,242	−6.8%
Source: Statistical Office of the Slovak Republic

=== Ethnicity ===
Census 2021 (1+ %)
Ethnicity	Number	Fraction
Slovak	23,792	92.04%
Not found out	1205	4.66%
Romani	307	1.18%
Total	25,847	

In year 2021 was 25,847 people by ethnicity 23,792 as Slovak, 1205 as Not found out, 307 as Romani, 134 as Czech, 87 as Other, 62 as Hungarian, 52 as Polish, 50 as Ukrainian, 31 as Russian, 21 as German, 17 as Rusyn, 14 as Chinese, 14 as Vietnamese, 11 as English, 10 as Romanian, 5 as Italian, 5 as Moravian, 5 as French, 4 as Turkish, 4 as Austrian, 4 as Greek, 4 as Albanian, 3 as Canadian, 2 as Jewish, 2 as Bulgarian, 1 as Irish and 1 as Serbian.

Note on population: The difference values of population numbers in the table "Population statistic" and in the sections "Ethnicity" & "Religion" is caused by the use of various statistical methods.

=== Religion ===
Census 2021 (1+ %)
Religion	Number	Fraction
Roman Catholic Church	17,679	70.04%
None	5166	20.47%
Not found out	1327	5.26%
Evangelical Church	329	1.3%
Total	25,242	

In year 2021 was 25,242 people by religion 17,679 from Roman Catholic Church, 5166 from None, 1327 from Not found out, 329 from Evangelical Church, 160 from Greek Catholic Church, 149 from Christian Congregations in Slovakia, 78 from Ad hoc movements, 74 from Eastern Orthodox Church, 65 from Other, 54 from Other and not ascertained christian church, 37 from Jehovah's Witnesses, 29 from Buddhism, 19 from Calvinist Church, 19 from Paganism and natural spirituality, 16 from Islam, 7 from Baptists Church, 5 from Old Catholic Church, 5 from United Methodist Church, 5 from Czechoslovak Hussite Church, 5 from Church of the Brethren, 5 from Seventh-day Adventist Church, 4 from Apostolic Church, 3 from Hinduism and 2 from Jewish community.

== Municipalities ==
Municipality	Area [km^{2}]	Population
Brehy	12.36	978
Hodruša-Hámre	46.17	1,989
Horné Hámre	19.67	717
Hrabičov	13.23	535
Hronský Beňadik	9.22	1,055
Kľak	22.79	165
Malá Lehota	22.83	785
Nová Baňa	61.25	6,799
Orovnica	14.24	511
Ostrý Grúň	16.79	542
Píla	25.79	131
Rudno nad Hronom	19.28	517
Tekovská Breznica	29.83	1,208
Veľká Lehota	18.61	996
Veľké Pole	35.61	415
Voznica	17.17	650
Žarnovica	30.39	5,509
Župkov	10.24	825

Population and area values are current for year 2025.
